= Shire of Bright =

Coordinates: 36°44′S 146°58′E

Shire of Bright Victoria
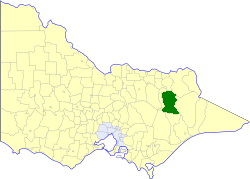
- Location in Victoria
- The Shire of Bright as of its dissolution in 1994
- Population: 6,570 (1992)
  - Density: 2.1139/km^{2} (5.475/sq mi)
- Established: 1862
- Area: 3,108 km^{2} (1,200.0 sq mi)
- Council seat: Bright
- Region: Hume
- County: Bogong, Delatite, Dargo, Wonnangatta
LGAs around Shire of Bright:
Myrtleford	Yackandandah	Tallangatta
Myrtleford	Shire of Bright	Omeo
Maffra	Avon	Omeo

The Shire of Bright was a local government area about 280 kilometres (174 mi) east-northeast of Melbourne, the state capital of Victoria, Australia. The shire covered an area of 3,108 square kilometres (1,200.0 sq mi), and existed from 1862 until 1994.

== History ==
Bright was first incorporated as a road district on 8 August 1862, and became a shire on 29 June 1866. On 17 May 1960, the Shire of Myrtleford was created out of its western border region.

On 18 November 1994, the Shire of Bright was abolished, and along with the Shire of Myrtleford and various surrounding districts, was merged into the newly created Alpine Shire.

== Wards ==
The Shire of Bright was divided into four ridings on 16 May 1961, each of which elected three councillors:

- Bright Riding
- Ovens Riding
- Kiewa Riding
- Mt Beauty Riding

== Towns and localities ==
- Bogong High Plains
- Bright*
- Buckland
- Eurobin
- Falls Creek
- Freeburgh
- Germantown
- Harrietville
- Mount Beauty
- Mount Buffalo
- Mount Feathertop
- Mount Hotham
- Porepunkah
- Smoko
- Tawonga
- Tawonga South
- Wandiligong

* Council seat.

== Population ==
Year	Population
1954	8,060
1958	9,740*
1961	4,331
1966	4,502
1971	4,659
1976	5,274
1981	6,794
1986	8,505
1991	11,828

* Estimate in the 1958 Victorian Year Book.
