= Great Alpine Road =

Highway in Victoria, Australia

Great Alpine Road Victoria
- Coordinates: 36.351303°S 146.333581°E (Northwest end); 37.818843°S 147.649329°E (Southeast end)

General information
- Type: Highway
- Length: 303.7 km (189 mi)
- Gazetted: November 1914 (as Main Road); 1947/48 (as State Highway)
- Route number(s): B500 (1996–present)
- Former route number: State Route 156 (1986–1996) (Wangaratta–Omeo); State Route 195 (1986–1996) (Omeo–Bairnsdale)

Major junctions
- Northwest end: Wangaratta Road; Wangaratta, Victoria
- Hume Freeway; Omeo Highway; Bruthen–Nowa Nowa Road
- Southeast end: Princes Highway; Bairnsdale, Victoria

Location(s)
- Major settlements: Myrtleford, Ovens, Eurobin, Bright, Harrietville, Mount Hotham, Dinner Plain, Omeo, Swifts Creek, Ensay, Bruthen

Highway system
- Highways in Australia; National Highway • Freeways in Australia; Highways in Victoria

The Great Alpine Road is a country tourist road in Victoria, Australia, running from Wangaratta in the north to Bairnsdale in the east, passing through the Victorian Alps. The road was given its current name because it was considered the mountain equivalent to Victoria's world-famous Great Ocean Road in the south-west of the state. The road usually remains open during winter; however, vehicles travelling between Harrietville and Omeo are required to carry diamond-pattern snow chains during the declared snow season.

== Route ==
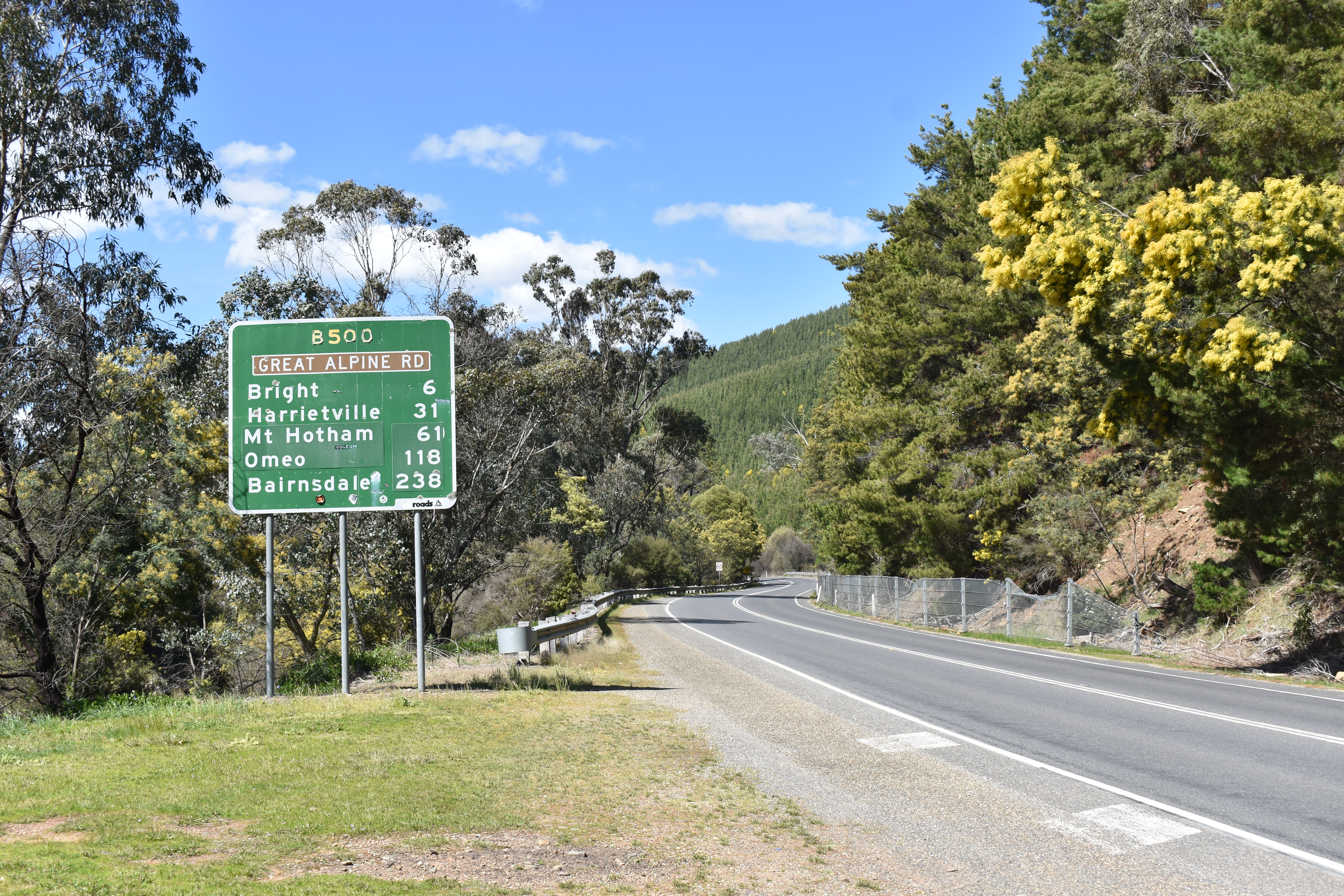
The Great Alpine Road at Porepunkah

The Great Alpine Road links Wangaratta with Bairnsdale, winding through mountains, valleys and forests, and past rivers, vineyards and farms. At a length of 304 kilometres (189 mi), it is Australia's highest year-round accessible sealed road. The section over Mount Hotham rises to an altitude of 1,840 metres (6,040 ft) AMSL. It is blanketed with snow during winter months and must be cleared on a daily basis. Extreme weather conditions can sometimes still result in the road being closed between Harrietville and Omeo.

The road itself has existed since colonial times in some form, but was unsealed for much of its history; with the last 12 km between Dinner Plain and Horsehair Plain completed in the 1997–98 financial year.

== History ==
The passing of the Country Roads Act 1912 through the Parliament of Victoria provided for the establishment of the Country Roads Board (CRB) and its ability to declare Main Roads, taking responsibility for the management, construction and care of the state's major roads from local municipalities. Bright Road from Myrtleford to Bright, and Harrietville Road from Bright to Harrietville, were declared Main Roads on 16 November 1914.

In 1923, the CRB took responsibility for the Alpine Road between Harrietville and Omeo, and appointed William Benjamin (Bill) Spargo (1888–1959) as supervisor. He lived in a stone cottage at Hotham Heights, which the CRB expanded, at his request, to accommodate up to twenty visiting skiers. From 1925, the premises operated as a guesthouse, Hotham Cottage (Hotham Heights Chalet). This was the forerunner of the Hotham Alpine Resort.

The passing of the Highways and Vehicles Act 1924 provided for the declaration of State Highways, roads two-thirds financed by the state government through the Country Roads Board. Ovens Highway was declared a State Highway within Victoria in the 1947/48 financial year, from Wangaratta via Myrtleford to Bright (for a total of 47.5 miles), subsuming the original declarations of Bright Road and Harrietville Road as Main Roads; before this declaration, the road was also referred to as (The) Alpine Road. The highway was eventually extended from Bright further along Alpine Road to Harrietville in September 1993.

Ovens Highway and Alpine Road, from Wangaratta to Omeo, along with the southern section of Omeo Highway from Omeo via Bruthen to Bairnsdale, was renamed the Great Alpine Road in late 1996;< the southern terminus of Omeo Highway was truncated to Omeo as a result.

Ovens Highway, and the remainder of Alpine Road beyond, was signed as State Route 156 between Wangaratta and Omeo in 1986; Omeo Highway was signed as State Route 195. With Victoria's conversion to the newer alphanumeric system in the late 1990s, and with its recent declaration as Great Alpine Road, its former route numbers were replaced with route B500 in late 1996.

The passing of the Road Management Act 2004 granted the responsibility of overall management and development of Victoria's major arterial roads to VicRoads: in 2004, VicRoads re-declared the road as Great Alpine Road (Arterial #4005), beginning at Wangaratta Road at Wangaratta and ending at Princes Highway in Bairnsdale.

== Gallery of some notable sights ==
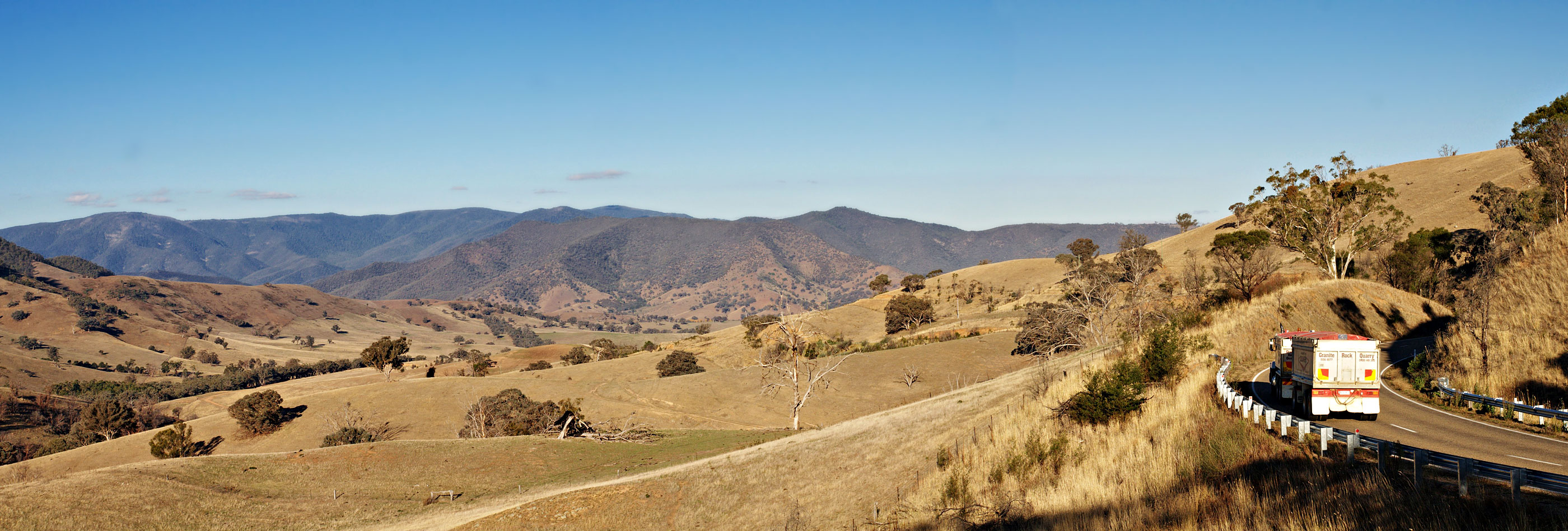
The Great Alpine Road descending "The Gap" between Omeo and Swifts Creek.

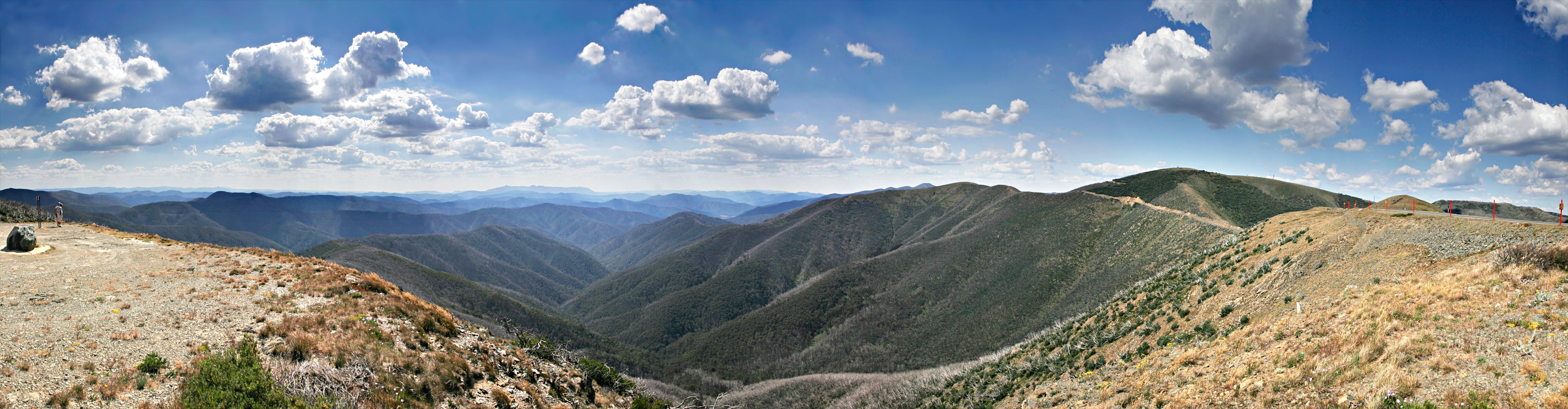
The Australian Alps from the Great Alpine Road on Mount Hotham.

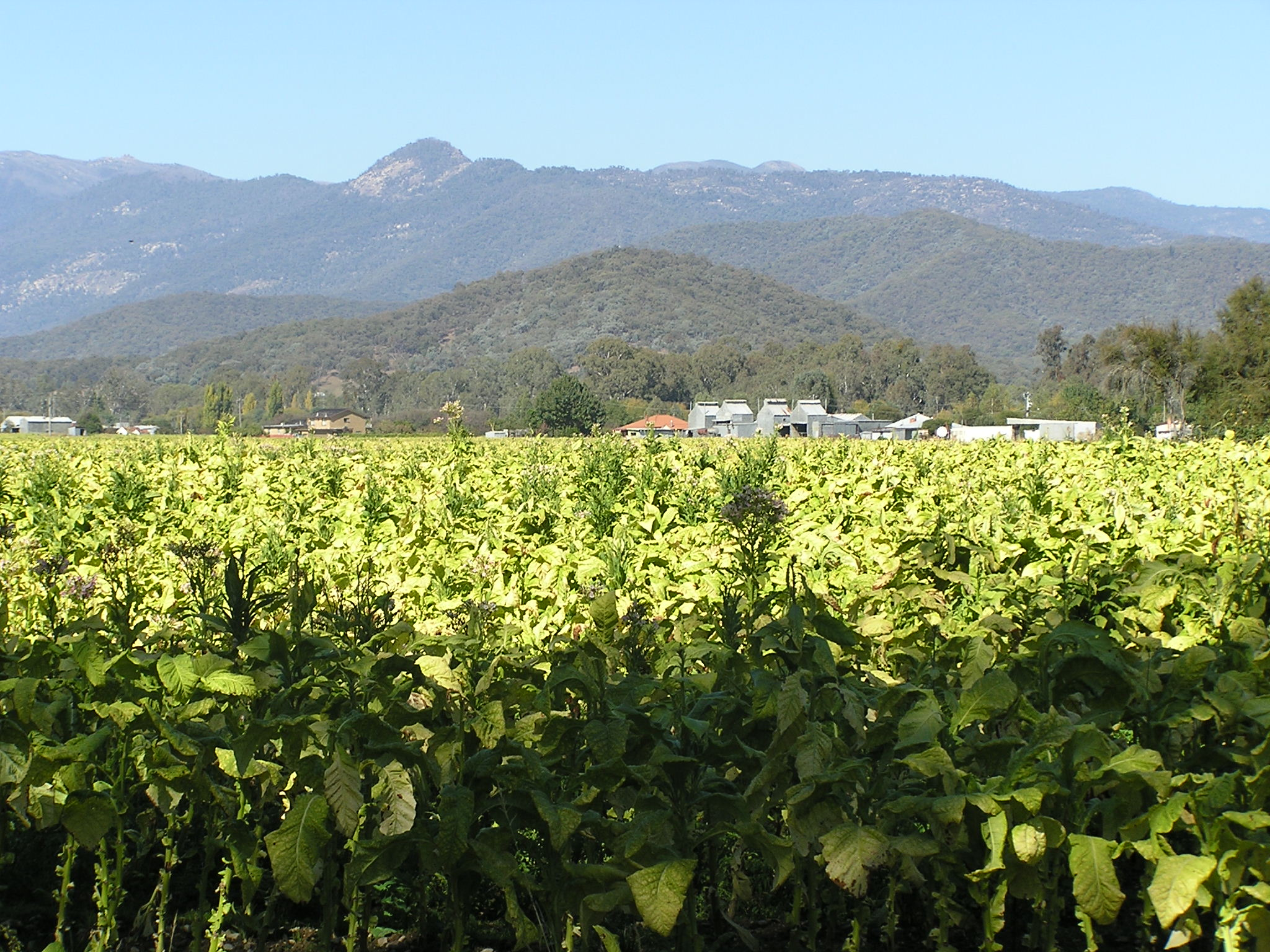
View from Myrtleford to Mount Buffalo National Park.

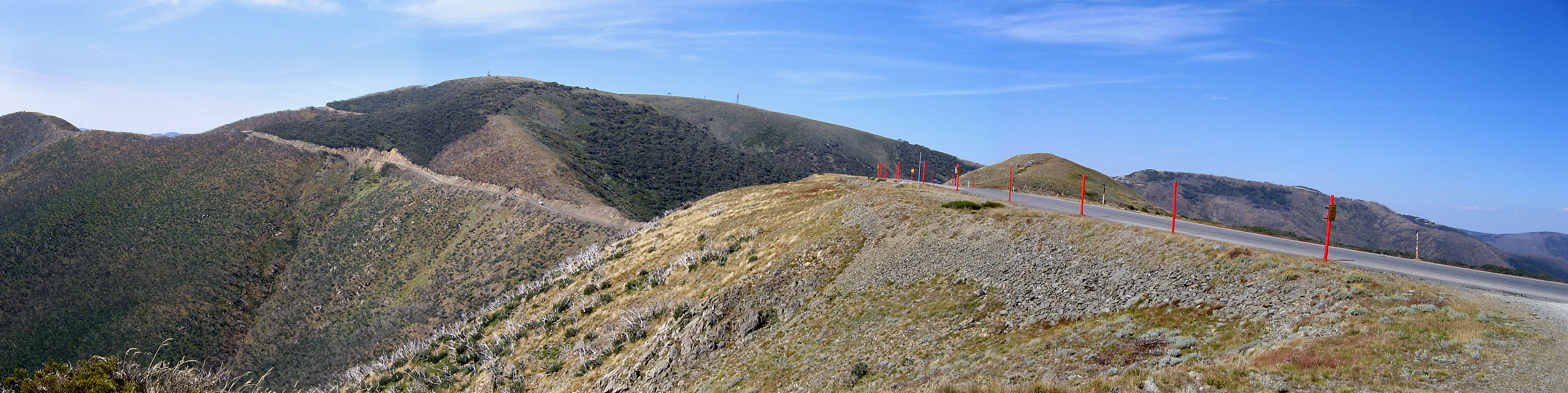
The Great Alpine Road winds across Mount Hotham, clinging to the side and ridge of the mountain

== Major intersections, towns and resorts ==
LGA	Location	km	mi	Destinations	Notes
Wangaratta	Wangaratta	0.0	0.0	Wangaratta Road - Wangaratta, Yarrawonga, Wodonga	Northwestern terminus of road and route B500
Wangaratta	East Wangaratta	4.2	2.6	Hume Highway - Seymour, Wodonga, Melbourne	
Wangaratta	Tarrawingee	11.0	6.8	Beechworth–Wangaratta Road (C315) Beechworth, Yackandandah	
Wangaratta	Bowmans Forest	33.7	20.9	Buckland Gap Road (C524) - Beechworth	
Alpine	Gapsted	39.4	24.5	Snow Road - Milawa, Glenrowan	
Alpine	Myrtleford	44.8	27.8	Myrtleford–Yackandandah Road (C527) - Yackandandah	
Alpine	Myrtleford	45.2	28.1	Buffalo River Road (C526) – Lake Buffalo	
Alpine	Ovens	50.1	31.1	Happy Valley Road (C534) - Mount Beauty	
Alpine	Porepunkah	69.9	43.4	Mount Buffalo Road (C535) – Mount Buffalo	Roundabout
Alpine	Bright	75.7	47.0	Anderson Street – Bright, to Morses Creek Road - Wandiligong	
Alpine	Germantown	81.3	50.5	Tawonga Gap Road (C536) - Mount Beauty	
Alpine	Harrietville	100.7	62.6	Mill Road - Harrietville	
Alpine	Hotham Heights	121.0	75.2	Dargo High Plains Road - Dargo, Bairnsdale	Summer season only road
Alpine	Mount Hotham	132.4	82.3	Davenport Drive – Mount Hotham	
Alpine	Dinner Plain	142.2	88.4	Horseshoe Circuit - Dinner Plain	
Alpine	Cobungra	152.5	94.8	Mount Hotham Airport Road – Mount Hotham Airport	
East Gippsland	Omeo	182.7	113.5	Cassilis Road – Cassilis	
East Gippsland	Omeo	186.3	115.8	Omeo Highway (C543) - Benambra, Tallangatta	
East Gippsland	Swifts Creek	211.9	131.7	Cassilis Road – Cassilis	
East Gippsland	Ensay	230.9	143.5	Ensay-Doctors Flat Road – Ensay	
East Gippsland	Bruthen	281.2	174.7	Bruthen–Nowa Nowa Road (C620) Buchan, Orbost	
East Gippsland	Wiseleigh	284.5	176.8	Sarsfield–Tambo Upper Road (C605) – Swan Reach	
East Gippsland	Lucknow	303.7	188.7	Princes Highway (A1) - Lakes Entrance, Orbost, Bairnsdale, Melbourne	Southeastern terminus of road and route B500 at roundabout
1.000 mi = 1.609 km; 1.000 km = 0.621 mi: Route transition

== See also ==
- Highways in Australia
- Highways in Victoria
