= List of places on the Victorian Heritage Register in Alpine Shire =

This is a list of places on the Victorian Heritage Register in Alpine Shire in Victoria, Australia. The Victorian Heritage Register is maintained by the Heritage Council of Victoria.

The Victorian Heritage Register, as of 2026, lists the following fifteen state-registered places within Alpine Shire:

| Place name | Place # | Location | Suburb or Town | Co-ordinates | Built | State registered | Photo |
|---|---|---|---|---|---|---|---|
| Bright Chinese Camp Site | VHR H2370 | 14-20 Delany Avenue | Bright | 36.728472°S 146.965833°E | 1859 | 8 June 2017 | |
| Bright Court House and Lockup | VHR H1921 | 1-3 Park Street | Bright | 36.731333°S 146.961333°E | 1860 | 20 August 1982 | |
| Buckland River Crossing | VHR H2431 | Buckland Valley Road | Buckland | 36.794373°S 146.848312°E | 1857 | 12 January 2023 | |
| Buckland River Hydraulic Gold Sluicing Paddock | VHR H1224 | Buckland Road | Buckland | 36.840917°S 146.842750°E | 1851 | 28 November 1996 | |
| Growlers Creek Gold Bucket Dredge Site | VHR H1303 | Williams Road | Wandiligong | 36.782583°S 146.992000°E | 1924 | 27 March 1997 | |
| Gun Reef Gold Battery Sites | VHR H1301 | Upper West Branch of Ovens River | Selwyn | 36.966361°S 147.031028°E | 1896 | 27 March 1997 | |
| Lyrebird Gully Hop Kiln | VHR H0070 | Lyrebird Gully Road | Harrietville | 36.897667°S 147.055722°E | c1877 | 11 May 2006 | |
| Maisie’s Plots | VHR H2424 | Bogong High Plains Road | Falls Creek | 36.892826°S 147.295715°E | 1944 | 1 September 2022 | |
| Melbourne University Mountaineering Club (MUMC) Hut | VHR H2470 | Northwest Spur Track, Mount Feathertop | Hotham Heights | 36.884886°S 147.126880°E | 1965 | 18 June 2026 | |
| Merriang Homestead | VHR H0566 | 6 Merriang Homestead Road | Merriang | 36.556583°S 146.681417°E | 1863 | 14 March 1984 | |
| Monarch Gold Battery Site | VHR H1273 | Great Alpine Road | Harrietville | 36.953611°S 147.059722°E | 1935 | 19 December 1996 | |
| Mount Buffalo Chalet | VHR H0901 | Mount Buffalo Road | Mount Buffalo | 36.722833°S 146.819417°E | 1910 | 22 January 1992 | |
| Primary School No.275 | VHR H1638 | 119 School Road | Wandiligong | 36.769222°S 146.983139°E | 1877 | 20 August 1982 | |
| Red Robin Gold Mine and Battery | VHR H1881 | West Kiewa Logging Track and Machinery Spur Track | Hotham Heights | 36.930778°S 147.182056°E | 1860 | 20 July 2000 | |
| Rose Thistle and Shamrock Quarry Gold Mining Precinct | VHR H1758 | Cemetery Lane | Harrietville | 36.881389°S 147.038278°E | 1860 | 26 November 1998 | |
| Sambas Gold Mine | VHR H2356 | Great Alpine Road | Harrietville | 36.918694°S 147.052333°E | 1910 | 12 October 2017 | |
| The Canyon Hydraulic Gold Sluicing Site | VHR H1231 | Frasers Lane | Bright | 36.723194°S 146.949972°E | 1899 | 13 August 1998 | |
| Tronoh Gold Dredging Ponds | VHR H1756 | Dredge Hole Lane and Feathertop Track | Harrietville | 36.895333°S 147.069194°E | 1942 | 26 November 1998 | |
