= Bright, Victoria =

Bright
- Town
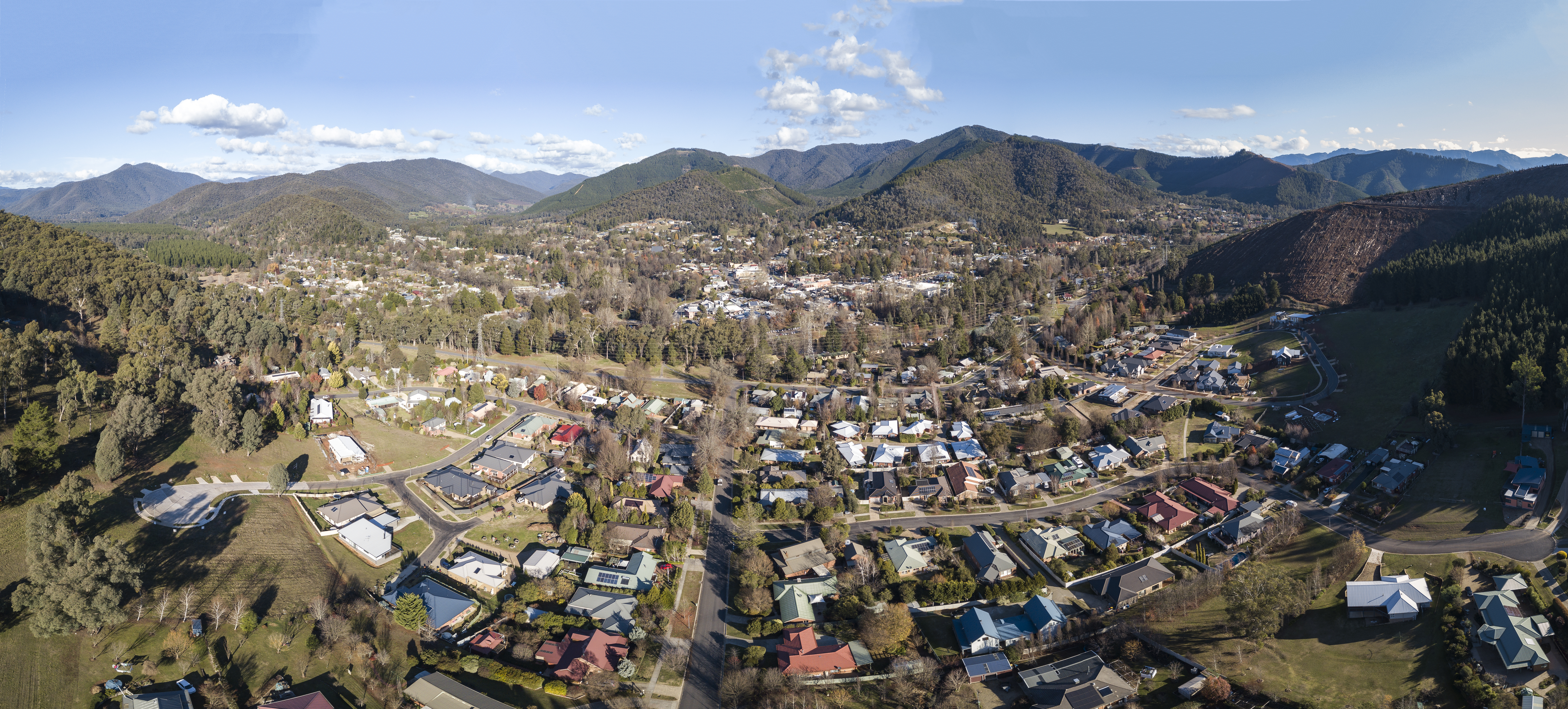
- Aerial panorama of Bright

- Interactive map of Bright
- Coordinates: 36°43′40″S 146°57′40″E
- Country: Australia
- State: Victoria
- Region: Hume
- LGA: Alpine Shire
- Location: 317 km (197 mi) NE of Melbourne; 78 km (48 mi) SE of Wangaratta

Government
  - State electorate: Ovens Valley
  - Federal division: Indi

Area
  - Total: 133.5 km^{2} (51.5 sq mi)
- Elevation: 319 m (1,047 ft)

Population
  - Total: 2,620 (2021 census)
  - Density: 19.63/km^{2} (50.83/sq mi)
- Postcode: 3741
- Mean max temp: 20.7 °C (69.3 °F)
- Mean min temp: 6.1 °C (43.0 °F)
- Annual rainfall: 1,133.8 mm (44.64 in)
Localities around Bright
Porepunkah	Kancoona	Coral Bank
Porepunkah	Bright	Tawonga
Buckland	Wandiligong	Germantown

Bright (pronunciation: /ˈbraɪt/) is a town in northeastern Victoria, Australia, 319 metres above sea level at the southeastern end of the Ovens Valley. At the 2021 census, Bright had a population of 2,620. It is located in the Alpine Shire local government area.

== History ==
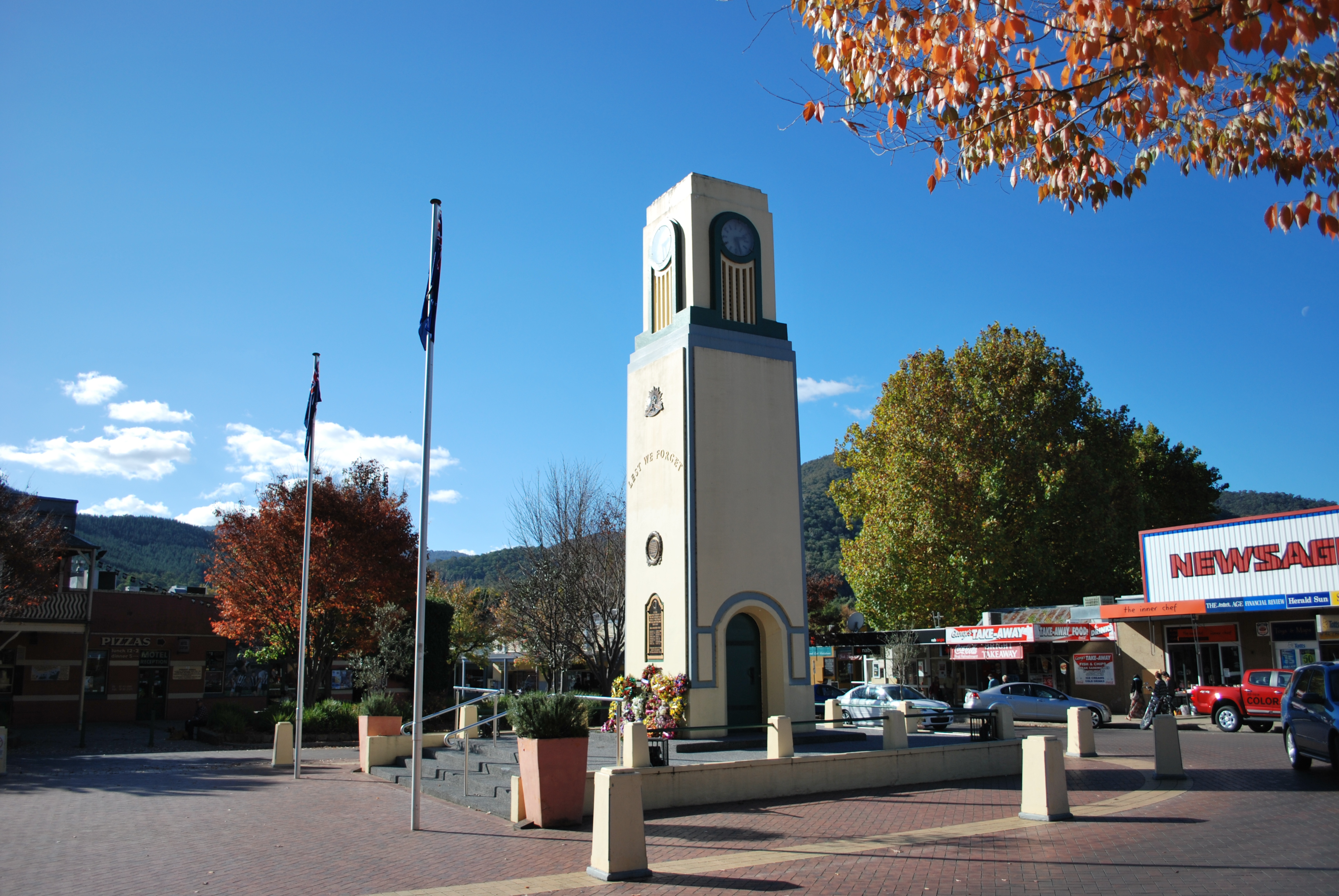
War memorial in the centre of Bright

Hamilton Hume and William Hovell explored the area in 1824, naming the Ovens River.

The town was first known as Morse's Creek after F.H. Morse but in 1861 it was renamed in honour of the British orator and politician John Bright. The Post Office opened on 25 January 1860 as Morse's Creek and was renamed Bright in 1866.

During the Victorian gold rush there was a rush to the nearby Buckland River. As the gold deposits gradually diminished, Chinese miners arrived in the area to sift the abandoned claims. Tensions over Chinese success from Anglo-Irish miners caused the violent Buckland Riot in nearby Porepunkah in 1857, resulting in deaths of Chinese miners and the fleeing of 2,000 Chinese. The riot was eventually quelled by the Beechworth police under the command of Robert O'Hara Burke from 80 kilometres away. Two years later, Bright itself was home to what became known as the Morses Creek Riots in which a Chinese miner was bludgeoned to death beside the river.

Bright has a rich cultural heritage and many locations within the town along with street names can be traced to present day residents. The Bright Historical Society has extensive records of the region's past.

The Bright Magistrates' Court closed on 1 January 1990.

== Features ==
The main industry of the town at the beginning of the 21st century is tourism, with much focus on the autumnal colours of the European trees planted in the area. A major cultural event is the Bright Autumn Festival.

Due to the number of paragliding and hang glider launch sites close to Bright, the town has been a centre of activity for paragliding festivals and competitions.

Bright is a major gateway to alpine scenery and has a variety of native birds and animals. Morses Creek and the Ovens River have adjoining tracks for short or long walks.

Bright is also a popular family destination over summer and the population swells, particularly after Christmas. During the summer months Bright enjoys consistently warm and sunny days with comfortable overnight temperatures.

The town is close to the Victorian Alps and various alpine national parks including the Mount Buffalo National Park. Mount Feathertop, Mount Bogong and Mount Hotham are also near the township. At 1986 metres above sea level, Bogong is the highest peak in the state of Victoria, and Feathertop is the second highest at 1922 metres.

The railway station has been preserved as a local history museum. Although trains no longer run from the township, the 95 km Murray to the Mountains Rail Trail allows cyclists to travel the same route that train passengers would have travelled via the townships of Myrtleford, Beechworth and Wangaratta.

== Climate ==
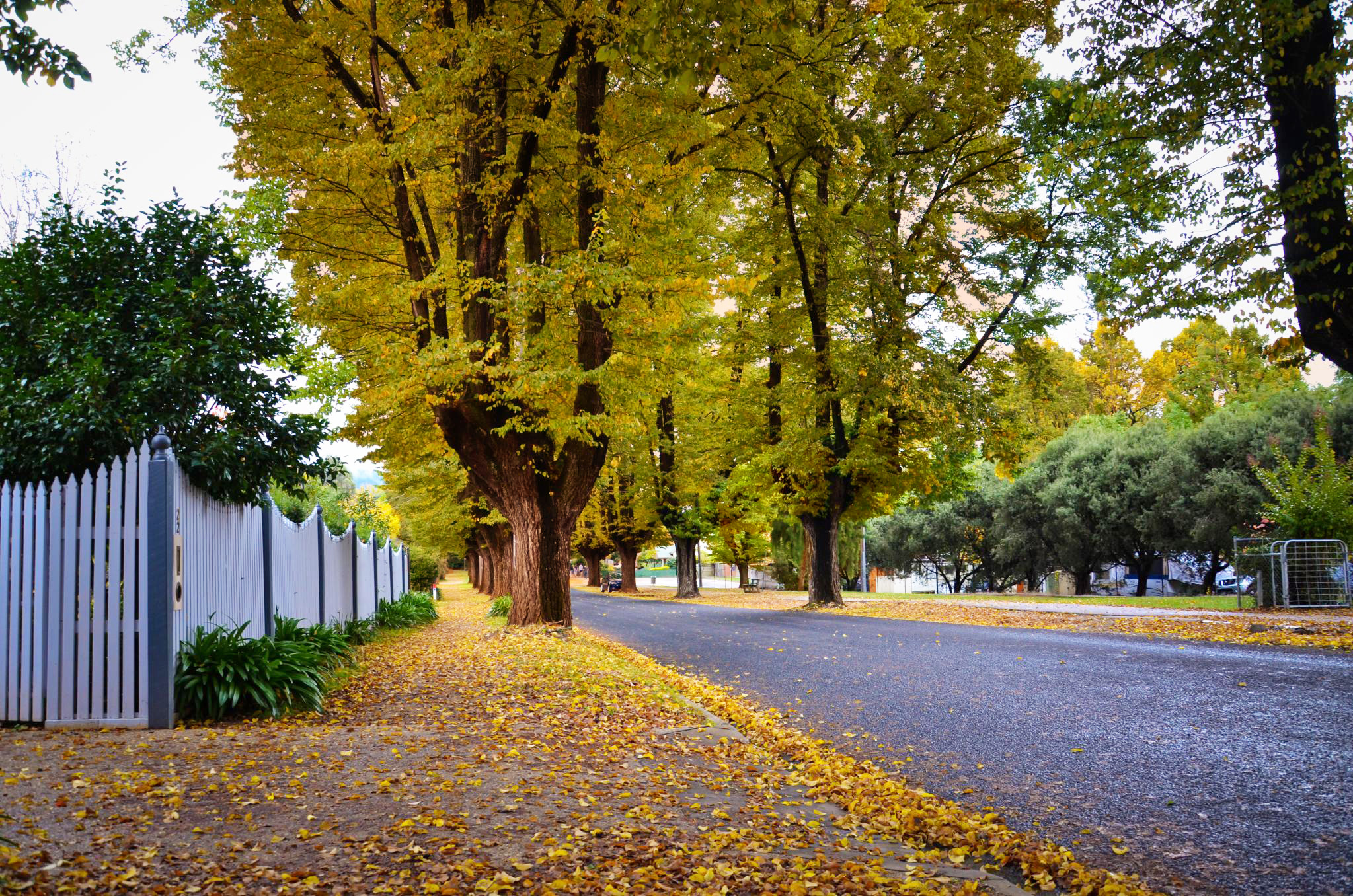
Autumn in Bright is colourful and lush, with cool days and cold nights.

Bright has an oceanic climate (Cfb) under the Köppen climate classification scheme, with four distinct seasons. Summer is warm and usually dry, with very cool to cold nights. Winter is cool and damp, with extended cloudy periods and chilling rains, and is frequented by storms. Frost is common throughout the year, with occasional winter snow. The highest recorded temperature in Bright was 40.7 °C (105 °F) on 8 February 1983 and the lowest recorded temperature was −7.8 °C (18 °F) on 30 June 1986.

Owing to its southern latitude nearing the 37th parallel, summers are notably cooler than at slightly northward towns such as Corryong, especially in the nights and mornings.

Climate data for Bright (1969–1994, rainfall to 2022); 319 m AMSL; 36.73° S, 146.96° E
Month	Jan	Feb	Mar	Apr	May	Jun	Jul	Aug	Sep	Oct	Nov	Dec	Year
Record high °C (°F)	40.6 (105.1)	40.7 (105.3)	38.4 (101.1)	33.2 (91.8)	27.2 (81.0)	20.7 (69.3)	21.1 (70.0)	24.5 (76.1)	31.2 (88.2)	31.2 (88.2)	37.9 (100.2)	39.8 (103.6)	40.7 (105.3)
Mean daily maximum °C (°F)	29.2 (84.6)	29.5 (85.1)	26.3 (79.3)	21.4 (70.5)	16.5 (61.7)	12.8 (55.0)	12.0 (53.6)	13.5 (56.3)	16.5 (61.7)	20.3 (68.5)	23.8 (74.8)	26.9 (80.4)	20.7 (69.3)
Mean daily minimum °C (°F)	10.9 (51.6)	11.4 (52.5)	8.9 (48.0)	5.9 (42.6)	3.9 (39.0)	1.8 (35.2)	1.5 (34.7)	2.2 (36.0)	3.5 (38.3)	5.6 (42.1)	7.5 (45.5)	9.7 (49.5)	6.1 (42.9)
Record low °C (°F)	1.7 (35.1)	2.3 (36.1)	0.0 (32.0)	−1.8 (28.8)	−3.3 (26.1)	−7.8 (18.0)	−5.4 (22.3)	−5.3 (22.5)	−3.8 (25.2)	−1.8 (28.8)	−0.6 (30.9)	1.0 (33.8)	−7.8 (18.0)
Average precipitation mm (inches)	70.2 (2.76)	63.5 (2.50)	59.0 (2.32)	69.6 (2.74)	99.9 (3.93)	108.2 (4.26)	135.2 (5.32)	140.7 (5.54)	119.7 (4.71)	102.2 (4.02)	85.4 (3.36)	73.0 (2.87)	1,133.8 (44.64)
Average precipitation days (≥ 0.2 mm)	7.0	6.7	7.0	8.3	11.8	13.6	16.9	17.8	14.3	12.0	10.5	8.5	134.4
Source: Bureau of Meteorology

== Education ==
Bright P–12 College is located within walking distance of the town centre. The college population includes students from the nearby townships of Porepunkah, Harrietville and Wandiligong. The college also operates an annex school in Dinner Plain during the winter season.

The college is one of a few state educational facilities in Victoria where primary and secondary students share the same campus.

== Flora and fauna ==
The local area has a variety of plants and animals. Many wildflowers, large and small trees, undergrowth and ferns can be seen close to each other. Within 350 metres of the town centre, just a few minutes walk, platypus, fish, yabbies and amphibians can be seen in their natural environment. Overhead there are dragonflies, harmless native bees and many species of birds including willy wagtail, kookaburra, Australian magpie and cockatoo which can often be heard in the area. Lyrebirds can be heard outside of town and wombats and the occasional echidna can be seen. Several species of mostly small reptile such as lizards live in the area and goannas or snakes can be found on one of the many nearby wooded bushwalking tracks.

== Sport ==
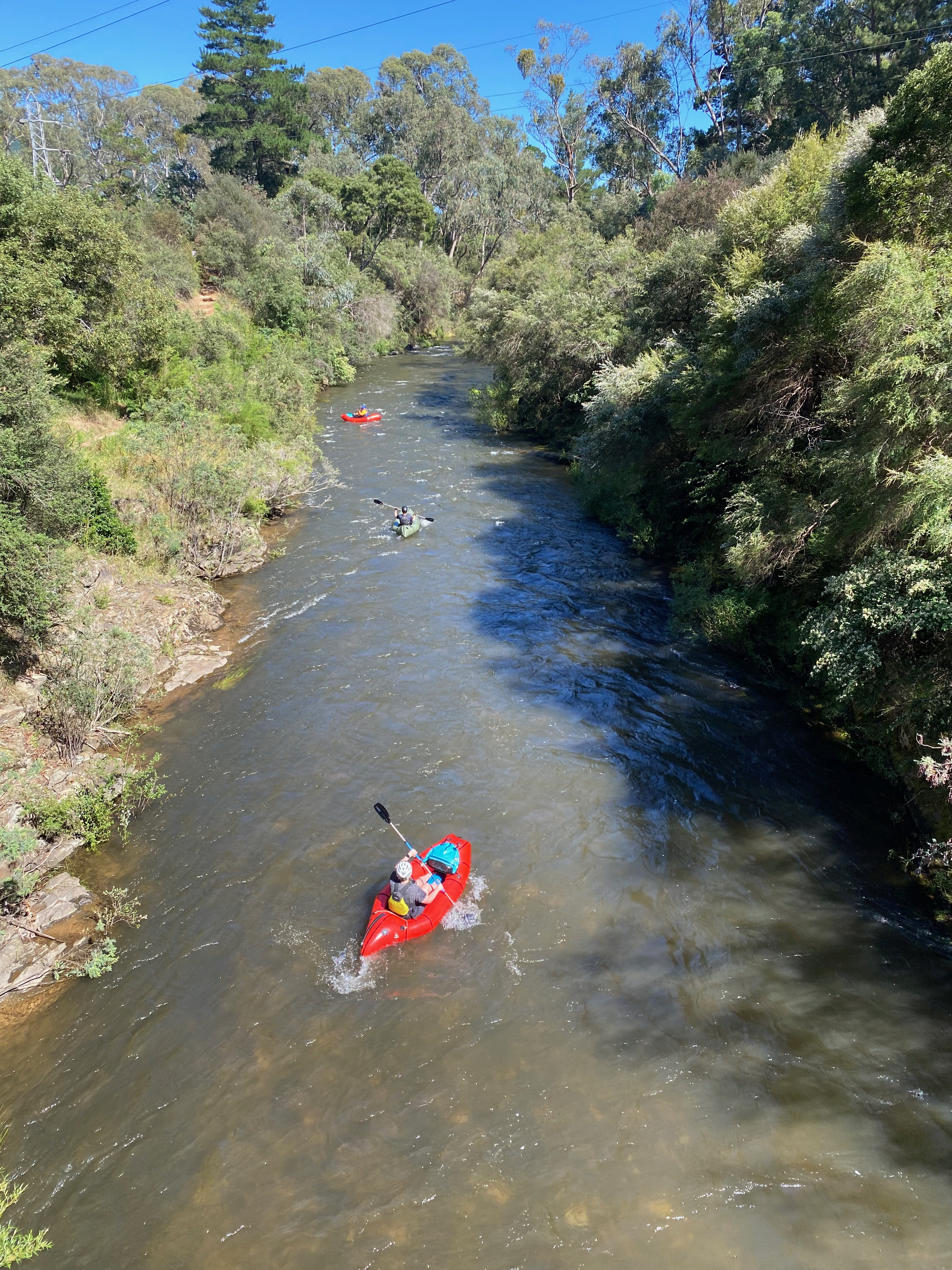
Kayakers on the Ovens River in Bright

Hang-gliding and paragliding are popular activities and the Mystic Flight Park is located 3 kilometres from town.

Fishing occurs in the rivers and dams in the area and are stocked with trout from the local hatchery. Native Murray cod have also been caught in the local rivers, but these are becoming increasingly rare.

Mountain biking trails exist close to the town centre. The tracks range from technical, fast, singletracks to easy river side rides. Best trails are found within the Baker's Gully area and downhill tracks are located off Mystic Hill, Apex Hill and in the Porepunkah pines on the south side of the Ovens River.

Cycling: The Audax Alpine Classic cycle event is run every Australia Day weekend by Audax Australia with over 2000 cyclists descending on Bright. The 200 km route takes the rider to Falls Creek and back and then a return trip to Mount Buffalo.

The town has an Australian Rules football team competing in the Ovens & King Football League.

Golfers play at the Bright Country Golf Club on Back Porepunkah Road.

Bright is the location of The Buffalo Stampede, which was Australia's first ever Sanctioned Skyrunning event in April 2014 with 2 events (75 km Ultra SkyMarathon and 42 km SkyMarathon). Starting and finishing at Howitt Park, the 75 km Ultra SkyMarathon takes runners up Mystic Hill, down to Baker's Gully, over Clearspot before descending into the Buckland Valley. Runners then make their way up Keatings Ridge over to Eurobin Creek before climbing The Big Walk to the Mt Buffalo Chalet. Once at the Chalet runners take the underground river track to Lake Catani and travel through Chalwell's Galleries before making their way back to the Chalet and retracing their steps all the way back to Howitt Park. The 42 km SkyMarathon takes on the same route but finishes at the Mount Buffalo Chalet once runners have completed the Chalet loop to Lake Catani and through Chalwell's Galleries to take them up to the 42 km mark. In 2015 a new event (The Sky26er) will be a part of this event. The Sky 26er will also start in Howitt Park before crossing the Ovens River and running up and over Quins Gap then climbing Telegraph Spur to the top of Mt Porepunkah. Once at the summit of Mt Porepunkah runners descend to Smart Creek Gap before climbing Tawonga Gap Ridge and making their way to Apex Lookout before they descend back into Bright to finish at Howitt Park. With a successful debut in 2014, the Buffalo Stampede is set to bring record numbers of runners and supporters to the township of Bright in April 2015.

== Local attractions ==
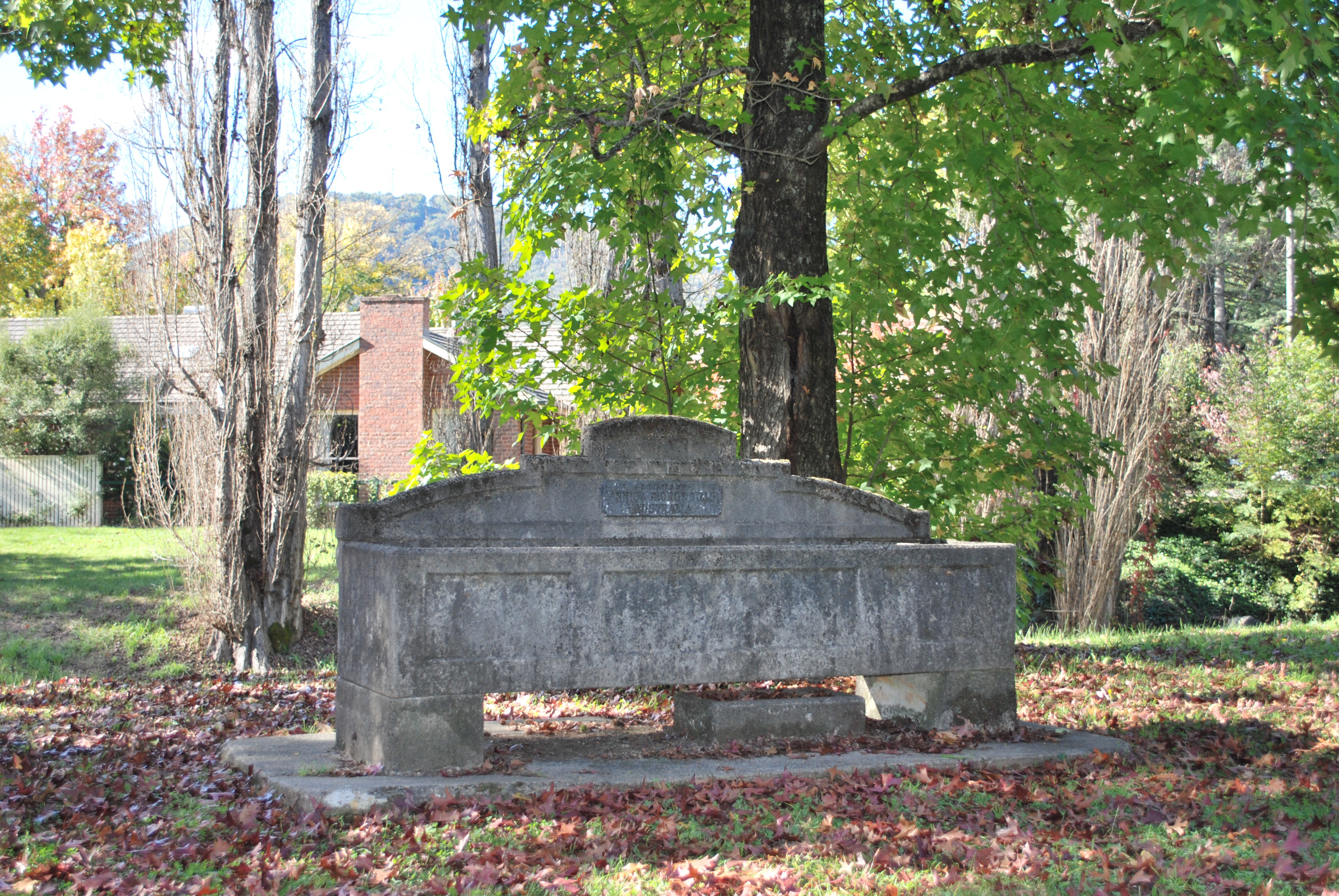
Bills horse trough

Local attractions include farms, wineries, historic sites, fruit orchards, restaurants, touring the beautiful natural landscape, surrounding mountains and more.

There are many events held in the Bright township and surrounding areas.

In spring, Bright holds regular markets, as well as the Bright Spring Festival, Bright 6 Hour Mountain Bike Event, Bright High Country Horse Endurance Ride, Art Exhibitions, Bright Grand Fireworks Spectacular and Concert, Bright Alpine Four Peaks Mountain Climb Harrietville Bluegrass and Traditional Country Music Convention and the Alpine Delight (Audax Cycling Event).

In summer, one can attend the Christmas Carols at the Bright Art Gallery, Carols by Candlelight at the Bright Sound Shell, the Rotary Waterside at Centenary Park or go for a Tandem Paraglide for an aerial view of Bright, or the Tour of Duty Bright, Military 6x6 vehicle for all the mountain secrets. There are also many markets in Bright and Harrietville, as well as the Alpine Valley's Gourmet Weekend and Drive in Movies at Pioneer Park. SP Ausnet - Tour of Bright - Road Cycling Race

Autumn brings the Bright Autumn Festival featuring lush autumn leaf colour, the Alpine Classic Golf Tournament, held in Bright, Myrtleford and Wangaratta. The Bright Easter Market is on as well as the Alpine Film Festival. The Buffalo Stampede Ultramarathon starting and finishing in Howitt Park is held mid-April bringing runners from all over the world to compete.

Winter brings snow to the surrounding peaks and the opening of the Snow Season on Queen's Birthday weekend.

== Transport ==
Road access to town is via the Great Alpine Road connecting to the Melbourne to Sydney Hume Freeway about 75 kilometres (47 mi) to the northwest or 120 kilometres (75 mi) to the north or through the Murray Valley Highway to the northeast, Canberra and the east coast, or along the continuation of the Great Alpine Highway to the southeast of the state.

Air access is via small aircraft landing strips in the area like Mount Hotham Airport 75 kilometres (47 mi) by road to the southeast, and Porepunkah Airport.

The town was served by the Bright railway line but this closed in the 1980s. During the late 1990s the line was converted into the Murray to the Mountains Rail Trail for cyclists and walkers. In terms of public transport, Bright is now served by a V/Line coach service from Wangaratta several times daily and the Alps Link to Omeo via Mount Hotham operated by Dysons.

== Media ==
=== Radio ===
Callsign	Frequency	Branding	Owner(s)	Format	License
3V05	087.6 MHz	Valley FM	Valley FM	1980's music 1990's music Electronic dance music	Low powered open narrowcast (LPON)
3ABCFM	088.1 MHz	ABC Classic	ABC Radio and Regional Content	Classical music	National radio
3ABCRN	088.9 MHz	ABC RN	ABC Radio and Regional Content	Talk radio	National radio
3JJJ	0103.3 MHz	Triple J	ABC Radio and Regional Content	Music, Current affairs, Youth content	National radio
3MRR	089.7 MHz	ABC Goulburn Murray	ABC Radio and Regional Content	Talk radio	National radio
3VKV	092.9 MHz	Alpine Radio	Kiewa Valley Community Radio Inc.	Freeform radio	Community radio

In addition, many radio stations from Wangaratta and Albury can be heard in the Bright area.

=== Television ===
- ABC
- Seven
- SBS
- 10
- WIN Television
