= Mudgegonga =

- Town
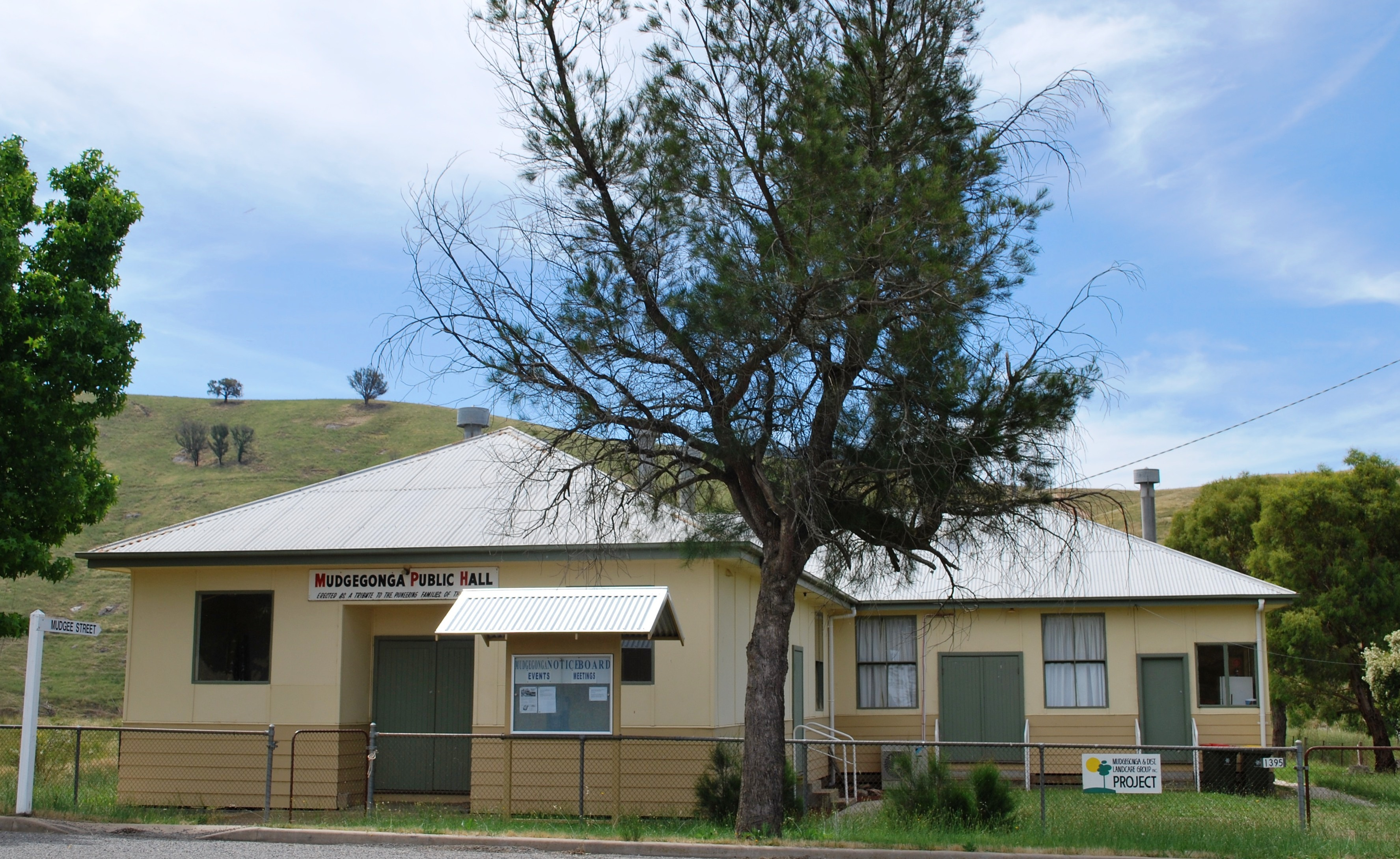
- Public hall

- Coordinates: 36°30′S 146°50′E
- Country: Australia
- State: Victoria
- Region: Hume
- LGAs: Alpine Shire; Shire of Indigo
- Location: 316 km (196 mi) NE of Melbourne; 62 km (39 mi) SE of Wangaratta; 17 km (11 mi) NE of Myrtleford

Government
  - State electorates: Ovens Valley; Benambra
  - Federal division: Indi

Population
  - Total: 172 (2016 census)
- Postcode: 3737

Mudgegonga is a locality in northeast Victoria, Australia. It is 316 kilometres (196 mi) northeast of the state capital, Melbourne. At the 2016 census, Mudgegonga had a population of 172.

Mudgegonga is 15 minutes from the nearest town Myrtleford; there are mainly farms situated in the area. The locality was affected by the Black Saturday bushfires, with two deaths in the region.
