= Shire of Myrtleford =

Coordinates: 36°33′S 146°43′E

Shire of Myrtleford Victoria
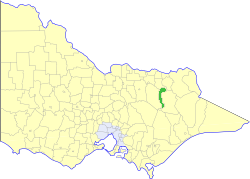
- Location in Victoria
- The Shire of Myrtleford as at its dissolution in 1994
- Population: 4,370 (1992)
  - Density: 5.5/km^{2} (14.1/sq mi)
- Established: 1960
- Area: 800 km^{2} (308.9 sq mi)
- Council seat: Myrtleford
- Region: Hume
- County: Bogong, Delatite
LGAs around Shire of Myrtleford:
Beechworth	Beechworth	Yackandandah
Oxley	Shire of Myrtleford	Bright
Mansfield	Maffra	Bright

The Shire of Myrtleford was a local government area about 280 kilometres (174 mi) northeast of Melbourne, the state capital of Victoria, Australia. The shire covered an area of 800 square kilometres (308.9 sq mi), and existed from 1960 until 1994.

== History ==
Myrtleford was created from parts of the Shire of Bright on 31 May 1960.

On 18 November 1994, the Shire of Myrtleford was abolished, and along with the Shire of Bright and various surrounding districts, was merged into the newly created Alpine Shire.

=== Ridings ===
Myrtleford was not divided into ridings, and its nine councillors represented the entire district.

== Towns and localities ==
- Barwidgee
- Buffalo River
- Merriang
- Myrtleford*
- Ovens

* Council seat.

== Population ==
Year	Population
1954	
1958	*
1961	3,770
1966	979
1971	4,434
1976	4,147
1981	4,170
1986	4,285
1991	4,314

* Estimate in the 1958 Victorian Year Book.
