= Porepunkah Airfield =

Airport in Victoria, Australia

Porepunkah Airport
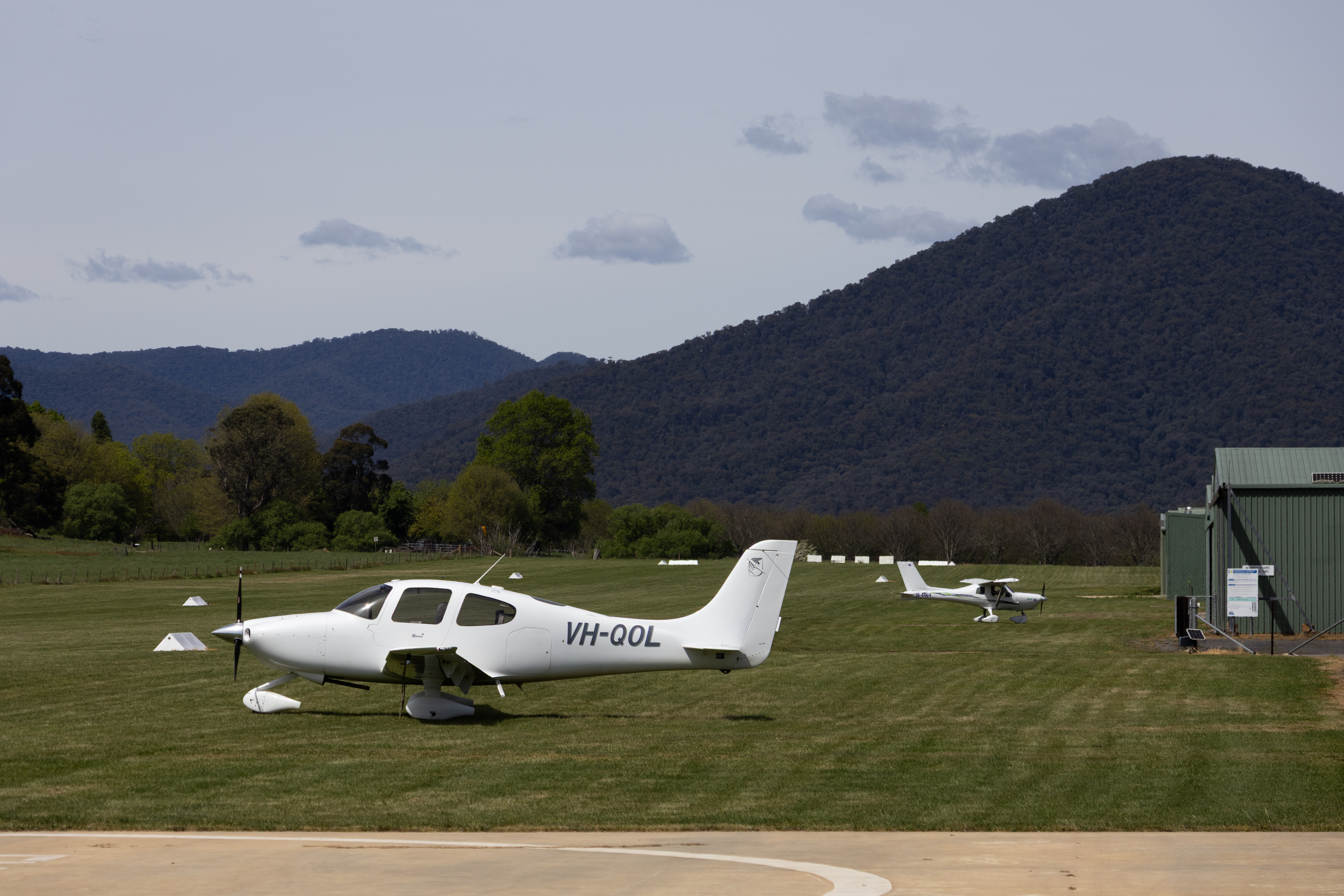
- IATA: none; ICAO: YPOK

Summary
- Airport type: Public
- Operator: Alpine Shire Council
- Serves: Porepunkah, Bright, Myrtleford
- Elevation AMSL: 935 ft / 285 m
- Coordinates: 36°43′06″S 146°53′25″E

Map
- Location in Victoria

Runways
Direction	Length		Surface
Direction	m	ft	Surface
18/36	750	2,461	Grass
- Sources: AIP

Porepunkah Airfield (ICAO: YPOK) is located in the Buckland Valley 1.5 nautical miles (2.8 km; 1.7 mi) southwest of the township of Porepunkah, Victoria, Australia. It is home to general aviation, ultralight and weight shift aircraft, gliders and occasionally hang gliders.

The airfield was originally a local farmer's paddock, and in 1978, formally commissioned as Buckland Airfield and since then has grown into a picturesque grassed airfield with user hangars, public toilets, public car parking and visiting aircraft parking.

The recent improvements to the airfield include a new vehicular entrance at the north end of the airstrip and the closure of the original road crossing the airfield.

The airfield is managed by a Committee of Management for the Alpine Shire.

The Geelong Gliding Club holds an annual Easter Camp at the Porepunkah aerodrome starting from the Good Friday until the Saturday next week.

== See also ==
- List of airports in Victoria
