= Wonnangatta =

- Town
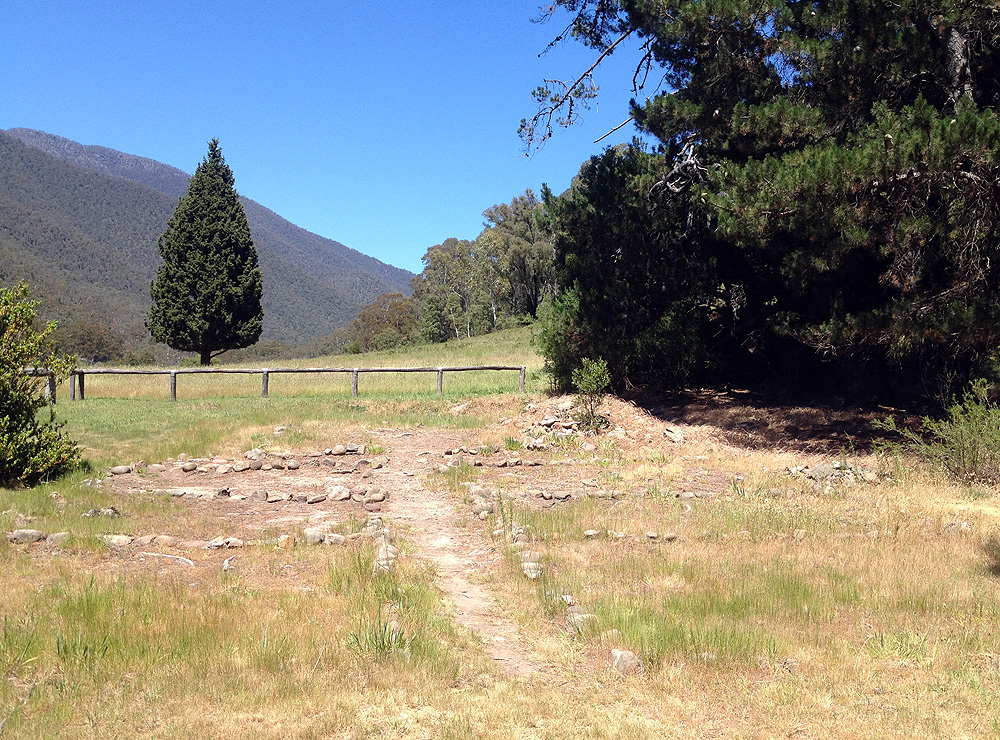
- The remains of the Wonnangatta Station, 2014

- Coordinates: 37°11′25″S 146°49′54″E
- Country: Australia
- State: Victoria
- Region: Hume
- LGA: Alpine Shire
- Location: 349 km (217 mi) NE of Melbourne; 102 km (63 mi) S of Myrtleford; 104 km (65 mi) WNW of Sale, Victoria

Government
  - State electorate: Ovens Valley
  - Federal division: Indi

Population
  - Total: 0 (2016 census)
- Postcode: 3737

Wonnangatta is a locality in north east Victoria, Australia. The locality is in the Alpine Shire local government area, 349 kilometres (217 mi) north east of the state capital, Melbourne.

At the 2016 census, the residential population of Wonnangatta was recorded as 0.

Wonnangatta Station was the site of the Wonnangatta murders in 1917.
