= MHU =

MHU may refer to:

== Education ==
- Maharana Pratap Horticultural University, Karnal district, Haryana, India
- Mars Hill University, North Carolina
- Ministry of Hajj and Umrah, a government ministry of Saudi Arabia
- Motherhood University, Haridwar district, Uttarakhand, India

== Other uses ==
- ISO 639:mhu or Digaro Mishmi language, spoken in India
- Mount Hotham Airport, Australia (by IATA code)
- Mouse Habitat Unit, a science experiment taken to the International Space Station on Kounotori 5
