= Roy Snell =

Roy Snell may refer to:

- Roy Snell (footballer), Australian rules footballer
- Roy J. Snell, American writer
