= Smoko (disambiguation) =

Smoko is a short break taken during work or military duty.

Smoko may also refer to:

- "Smoko" (song), by the Chats, 2017
- Smoko, Victoria, a locality in Australia
