= Harry Lack =

Australian rules footballer

Personal information
- Full name: Henry Walpole Lack
- Born: 31 October 1927; Myrtleford, Victoria
- Died: 20 July 2009 (aged 81); Nelson Bay, New South Wales
- Original team: Myrtleford
- Height: 179 cm (5 ft 10 in)
- Weight: 85 kg (187 lb)

Playing career^{1}
Years	Club	Games (Goals)
1952	Melbourne	3 (0)
- ^{1} Playing statistics correct to the end of 1952.

Henry Walpole Lack (31 October 1927 – 20 July 2009) was an Australian rules footballer who played with Melbourne in the Victorian Football League (VFL).

== Family ==
The son of Raymond Tilston Lack (1892–1973), and Alice Matilda Rose Lack (1884–1974), née Walpole, Henry Walpole Lack was born at Myrtleford, Victoria, on 31 October 1927.
