= Rosewhite =

- Town
- Coordinates: 36°34′26″S 146°53′20″E
- Country: Australia
- State: Victoria
- Region: Hume
- LGA: Alpine Shire
- Location: 295 km (183 mi) NE of Melbourne; 53 km (33 mi) SE of Wangaratta; 4 km (2.5 mi) SE of Myrtleford

Government
  - State electorate: Ovens Valley
  - Federal division: Indi
- Elevation: 335 m (1,099 ft)

Population
  - Total: 168 (2011 census)
- Postcode: 3737
- Mean max temp: 26.6 °C (79.9 °F)
- Mean min temp: 10.1 °C (50.2 °F)
- Annual rainfall: 769.1 mm (30.28 in)

Rosewhite is a locality in north-east Victoria, Australia in the Alpine Shire local government area. At the 2011 census, Rosewhite had a population of 168.

It lies beside Happy Valley Creek which commences at the top of the Rosewhite valley, crosses Carrolls Road, and passes through the town of Ovens, and then Myrtleford.

The valley was originally named Happy Valley with the Barwidgee Run in the 19th century. After World War I, the land was dissected into soldier settler blocks, mostly running dairy farms. The valley was renamed Rose White or Rosewhite, after Rose White Lincoln (1904-1927) the deceased sister of the Myrtleford Post master Max Lincoln. The Post Office opened on 2 October 1919, as Barwidgee Settlement, to serve the settlers. It was renamed Rose White in 1937 and closed in 1954.

Today the valley remains primarily rural, with beef cattle production and a couple of dairy farms. The area is part of the Alpine Valleys Wine region.
