= Diuris ochroma =

Pale goat orchid

Conservation status
- Vulnerable (EPBC Act)

Scientific classification
- Kingdom: Plantae
- Clade: Tracheophytes
- Clade: Angiosperms
- Clade: Monocots
- Order: Asparagales
- Family: Orchidaceae
- Subfamily: Orchidoideae
- Tribe: Diurideae
- Genus: Diuris
- Species: D. ochroma

Binomial name
- Diuris ochroma D.L.Jones

Species of orchid

Diuris ochroma, commonly known as pale goat orchid, or pale golden moths is a species of orchid that is endemic to south-eastern continental Australia. It has three or four leaves at its base and up to four slightly drooping pale yellow flowers with dark reddish purple streaks. It is an uncommon species found in two disjunct populations, in higher parts of each of New South Wales and Victoria.

== Description ==
Diuris ochroma is a tuberous, perennial herb with between three and four linear leaves 180–300 mm (7–10 in) long and 3–5 mm (0.1–0.2 in) wide. Up to four slightly drooping pale yellow flowers with dark reddish purple streaks and about 25 mm (1 in) wide are borne on a flowering stem 250–400 mm (10–20 in) tall. The dorsal sepal projects forward and is egg-shaped, 10–13 mm (0.4–0.5 in) long and 7–9 mm (0.3–0.4 in) wide. The lateral sepals are lance-shaped with the narrower end towards the base, 14–19 mm (0.6–0.7 in) long, 1.5–3.5 mm (0.06–0.1 in) wide, lean downwards and are more or less parallel to each other. The petals are egg-shaped, 7–9 mm (0.3–0.4 in) long, 4–5 mm (0.16–0.20 in) wide and spread apart from each other on a green to purplish stalk 6–8.5 mm (0.2–0.3 in) long. The labellum is 13–16 mm (0.5–0.6 in) long and has three lobes. The centre lobe is oblong, 8.5–11 mm (0.3–0.4 in) wide with a raised ridge in its midline. The side lobes are oblong, about 3 mm (0.1 in) long, 1.5 mm (0.06 in) wide with dark reddish purple streaks. There are between two and four more or less parallel callus ridges in the lower part of the mid-line of the labellum. Flowering occurs in November and December.

== Taxonomy and naming ==
Diuris ochroma was first formally described in 1994 by David Jones from a specimen collected near the Wonnangatta River and the description was published in Muelleria. Jones stated that the specific epithet ochroma was derived from the Greek ochroma, and means "pale" or "wan", referring to the pale yellow flowers of this species. In ancient Greek, ochroma (ὤχρωμα) is a noun meaning "pallor".

== Distribution and habitat ==
The pale goat orchid occurs in two disjunct areas, one in New South Wales and one in Victoria. The New South Wales population, estimated in 2008 to include about 130 plants, occurs on the Monaro Tableland. Two Victorian populations, estimated to contain a total of about eight thousand plants in 2010, are found in the Alpine National Park and on a roadside near Abbeyard.

== Conservation ==
Diuris ochroma is classed as "vulnerable" under the Australian Government Environment Protection and Biodiversity Conservation Act 1999, as "endangered" in New South Wales under the Biodiversity Conservation Act 2016 and as "threatened" in Victoria under the Flora and Fauna Guarantee Act 1988. The main threats to the species are weed invasion, grazing by native, feral and stock animals, habitat loss and disturbance and inappropriate fire regimes.
