= Dandongadale =

- Town
- Coordinates: 36°50′23″S 146°42′12″E
- Country: Australia
- State: Victoria
- Region: Hume
- LGA: Alpine Shire

Government
  - State electorate: Ovens Valley
  - Federal division: Indi

Population
  - Total
- Postcode: 3737

Dandongadale is a locality in Alpine Shire, Victoria, Australia. At the 2021 census, Dandongadale had "no people or a very low population".

== History ==
Dandongadale school opened in 1931.
