= Smoko, Victoria =

Smoko
- Town
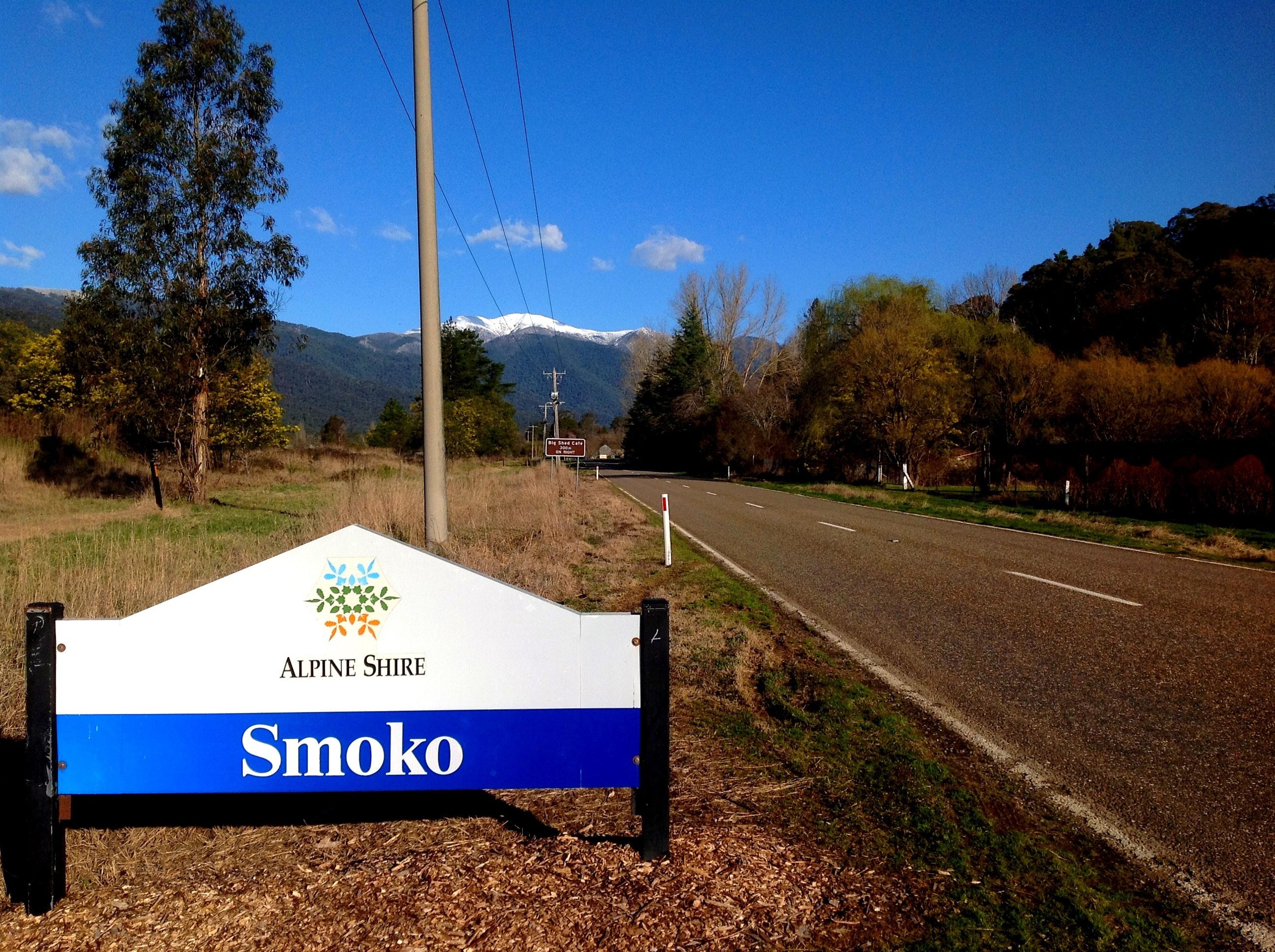
- Entering Smoko

- Coordinates: 36°49′36″S 147°04′07″E
- Country: Australia
- State: Victoria
- Region: Hume
- LGA: Alpine Shire
- Location: 337 km (209 mi) NE of Melbourne; 95 km (59 mi) SE of Wangaratta; 8 km (5.0 mi) N of Harrietville

Government
  - State electorate: Ovens Valley
  - Federal division: Indi

Population
  - Total: 56 (SAL 2021)
- Postcode: 3741

Smoko is a locality in north east Victoria, Australia. The locality is in the Alpine Shire local government area, 337 kilometres (209 mi) north east of the state capital, Melbourne. The town "gained its name in the 1850s because gold seekers regularly stopped here for a smoke and a rest on their way to and from the goldfields".

At the 2016 census, Smoko had a population of 46.
