= Barwidgee =

- Town
- Coordinates: 36°30′43″S 146°46′22″E
- Country: Australia
- State: Victoria
- Region: Hume
- LGA: Alpine Shire

Government
  - State electorate: Ovens Valley
  - Federal division: Indi

Population
  - Total: 96 (2021 census)
- Postcode: 3737

Barwidgee (formerly known as Barwidgee Creek) is a locality in northeast Victoria, Australia. The nearest town to Barwidgee is Myrtleford about 5.44 km away. Barwidgee is within Alpine Shire.

Barwidgee Creek Post Office opened on 1 March 1912 and closed in 1957.

Barwidgee was affected by the Black Saturday bushfires, with some deaths in the region and many homes lost.
