= Gapsted =

- Town
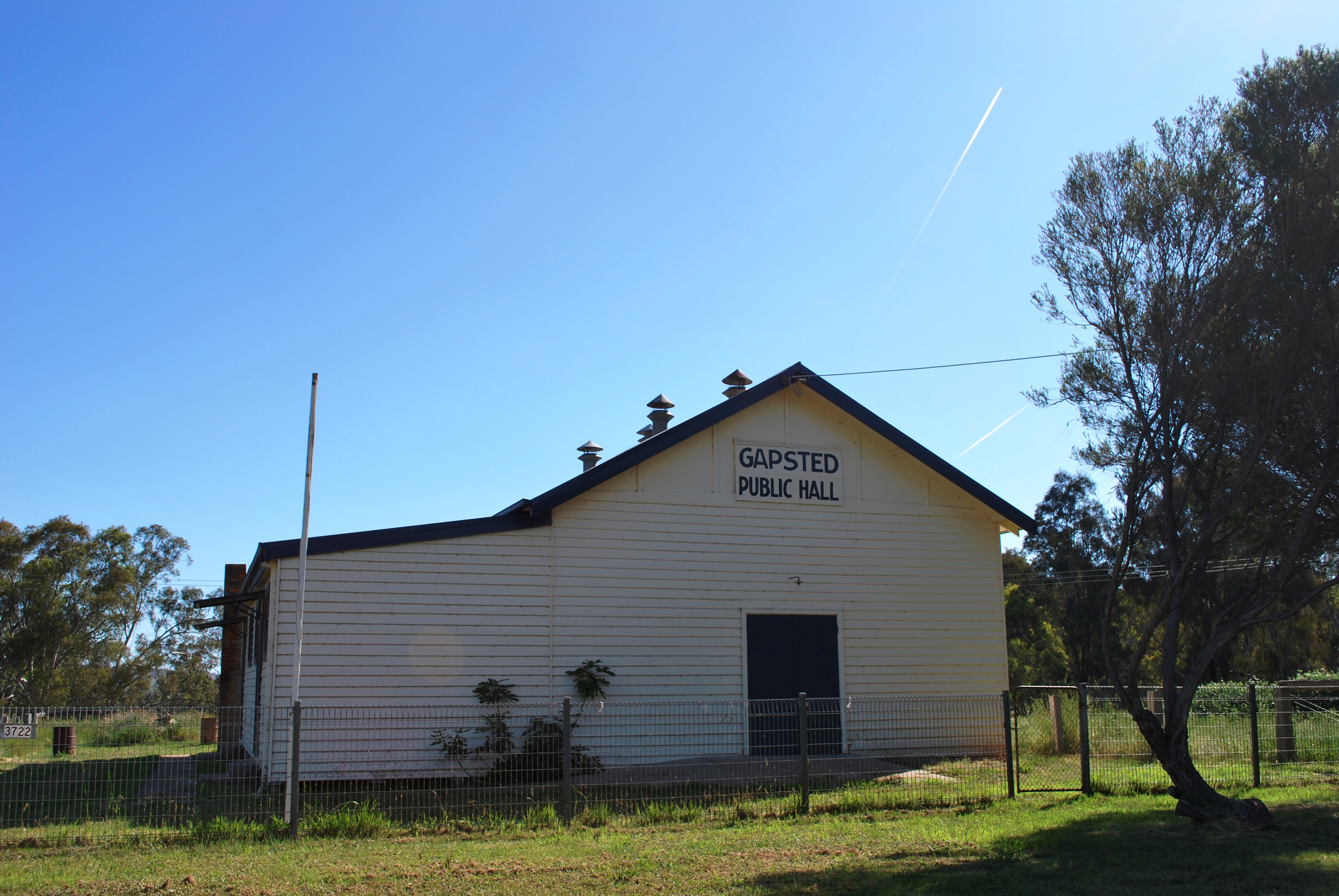
- Public hall at Gapsted, 2009

- Coordinates: 36°30′30″S 146°40′34″E
- Country: Australia
- State: Victoria
- Region: Hume
- LGA: Alpine Shire
- Location: 288 km (179 mi) NE of Melbourne; 40 km (25 mi) SE of Wangaratta; 8 km (5.0 mi) NE of Myrtleford; 20 km (12 mi) S of Beechworth

Government
  - State electorate: Ovens Valley
  - Federal division: Indi
- Elevation: 239 m (784 ft)

Population
  - Total: 173 (2016 census)
- Postcode: 3737

Gapsted is a locality in north east Victoria, Australia. The locality is in the Alpine Shire local government area, 288 kilometres (179 mi) north east of the state capital, Melbourne.

At the 2016 census, Gapsted had a population of 173.
