= Bright P-12 College =

Bright P–12 College

Location
- Bright, Victoria; Australia
- Coordinates: 36°44′01″S 146°57′41″E

Information
- Type: Public, secondary school
- Motto: To the Highest
- Gender: Coed
- Website: www.brightp12.vic.edu.au

Bright P–12 College is a public school situated in Bright, Victoria, Australia. It has approximately 595 students and 60 staff. The principal is Jean Olley, and the college council president is Peter Mack.

The original school building (still in use) was constructed in 1876.
