= Christopher Minko =

Australian musician

- Born: Christopher Julian Minko; Myrtleford, Victoria, Australia
- Genres: Delta blues, folk pop music
- Occupations: Musician, aid worker, event organiser
- Instruments: Guitar, trumpet, vocals
- Years active: 1980–present

Christopher Minko is an Australian musician and co-founder of the Phnom Penh-based Delta blues group called Krom. Living in Cambodia since 1996, Minko is also the founder and Secretary General of the Cambodian National Volleyball League (Disabled) NGO, also known as CNVLD.

== Early life in Australia ==
Minko was born to a Ukrainian-German father who studied forestry at the University of Weihenstephan near Munich during World War 2. The Minko family had fled to the Reich with the Wehrmacht and other Galician-Germans when the Soviet Army marched West. Christopher Minko's father George, emigrated to Australia after the war, and Christopher Minko spent his early life in Myrtleford, Victoria.

== NGO career ==
=== CNVLD - Cambodian National Volleyball League (Disabled) ===
In 2002, with the aid of a grant from AusAID, Minko established the Cambodian National Volleyball League (Disabled) organization, also known as CNVLD, which would be officially registered as a Local Cambodian Non-Governmental Organisation (NGO) working in cooperation with the Ministry of Social Affairs, Veterans and Youth Rehabilitation. Standing volleyball was already popular in Cambodia with the Cambodian team winning a silver medal in 1999 at the ASEAN Para Games in Thailand, and a gold medal at the 2001 ASEAN Para Games. The Cambodian National Standing Volleyball teams also participated at the 2000 Sydney Paralympics.

For fundraising purposes, Minko promoted the CNVLD Honorary board as including Prime Minister Hun Sen as Patron, Christopher Minko as Director General, Okhna Suor Pheng as chairman, Wolfgang Kitz as vice-chairman, and the directors included International Women's Rights specialist Mmaskepe Sejoe and Dean Cleland (CEO ANZ Bank Asia).

In 2002 the CNVLD was recognized by the Swiss Academy for Development as achieving 'best practice' status in recognition of its work within the disability sports sector.

In 2005, CNVLD established a National Wheelchair Racing Program that would reveal a talent, Van Vun, who has since become a national hero and has gone on to compete in top racing events such as ASEAN ParaGames in Indonesia and won medals. His goal was the 2012 Paralympics. His story received international coverage when the Cambodian National Paralympic Committee neglected to file proper paperwork and he was denied his dream of competing at the 2012 Paralympics in London. though according to their fundraising literature, CNVLD and the Cambodian Paralympic Committee were both 'tasked with providing the training and entry requirements necessary for ensuring the participation of a Cambodian Wheelchair Racing Athlete for the first time ever in the Paralympic Games'.

In 2007, 2009, and 2011, the CNVLD appeared in three Standing Volleyball World Cups held in Phnom Penh, and organized by World Organization Volleyball for Disabled. The Cambodia national team won a silver medal at the 2011 Standing Volleyball World Cup.

In 2011, the CNVLD established a Deaf Women's Volleyball Team.

=== CNVLD Women's Wheelchair Basketball Program ===
In 2012, the ICRC & CNVLD (International Committee of the Red Cross) and the Ministry of Social Affairs, Veterans and Youth Rehabilitation (MoSVY) launched a pilot wheelchair basketball program at the Battambang Center for Physical Rehabilitation. The Women's Wheelchair Basketball Program was specifically designed to provide sporting and social economic opportunity to rural Cambodian women with disabilities. Women selected to participate receive a small salary of $40 per month (funded by the International Red Cross), educational opportunities, and high quality training sessions with professional coaches.

In early 2013, an additional program was launched in Kampong Speu, Cambodia, and that August a competition between teams from Battambang and Kampong Speu was held, becoming the first-ever wheelchair basketball tournament in the country.

In early 2015, the CNVLD's involvement with the Women's Wheelchair Basketball Program ceased with the ICRC managing the Women's Wheelchair basketball project within the MOSVY Rehabilitation Centers. The program continues to go from strength to strength under ICRC management, and the National Team recently qualified for the Asian Paralympic games to be held in 2018.

=== CNVLD funding, governance and Minko's criticism of international aid ===
Minko has been outspoken about his repugnance for NGOs in Cambodia and its participants, who he has frequently called 'band aid parasites' with 'questionable fund raising tactics'. Minko has cited 'the inefficiency and mismanagement' and corruption regarding the World Aid Organization dollars that have poured into Cambodia.

Minko stated that "CNVLD does not accept donor funding, choosing instead to develop long-term corporate relationships with partners such as Nike, ANZ Royal and The Government of Cambodia".

However, Minko's criticism has caused controversy with AusAid pointing out that Minko's CNVLD received $200,000 in funding from them. Minko also received significant funding via Global Giving campaigns as well as the International Committee of the Red Cross, and private donors. Funding of $653,000 was also sought from the United Nations Mine Action Service.

== Musical career ==
=== Film ===
Award-winning film director Sir Roland Joffé (The Killing Fields, The Mission) once expressed interest in doing a film about the Volleyball World Cup events that had taken place in Cambodia, referring to the World Cup events as a sporting triumph for Cambodia and the disabled athletes. As a follow-up to The Killing Fields – his potential film that would be a "living postscript" – this would be an uplifting movie about disabled athletes punching their way out of poverty.

=== Proposed Leonard Cohen concert in Phnom Penh ===
"In a very deep state of depression I wrote to the master of depression". Minko wrote a heartfelt e-mail to Leonard Cohen about Cambodia and the situation of the disabled people in the same country, suggesting that a charity concert could be held in Phnom Penh. Minko's suggestion was accepted two weeks later by Cohen in an e-mail sent by his manager Robert Kory, confirming that Robert Hallet would be working with Minko on Cohen's Phnom Penh concert scheduled for November 2010.

The Leonard Cohen concert was cancelled three weeks before its scheduled date due to slow ticket sales and costs of production, and poor management.

Leonard Cohen later donated $50,000 to CNVLD. According to Minko, Prek Ksay pagoda in Neak Loeung, Prey Veng Province will be the beneficiary of this contribution, and the money will be used to build a state-of-the-art, environmentally friendly school complex including sports facilities and a disability centre. The project is expected to be completed in the very distant future according to Minko.

=== Krom & Mekong Sessions label ===
In 2010, Minko started his own music group which he named 'Krom', meaning 'The Group' in Khmer language.

On 6 September 2010, Krom recorded a song written by Minko using the title of Johnny Cash's song I Walk the Line. It was released by Minko's 'Mekong Sessions' label in VCD format, sold in stores in and around Phnom Penh, and featured on Cambodia television and radio. At that time Krom members numbered seven and Minko sang vocals along with a Khmer singer, and also played guitar. Krom's cover of Johnny Cash's I Walk the Line was later re-recorded and renamed to 'Thinkin' It Over', and was included in Krom's debut album 'Songs from the Noir'.

By 2012, the group had undergone normal growing pains and personnel changes that resulted in its reformatting. The description on the official website became then: "Krom is Phnom Penh based – and its composer, songwriter, guitarist, vocalist, Christopher Minko, working with leading Khmer singer & songwriter Sophea Chamroeun and sound engineer Sarin Chhuon and guest musicians". The band is also made up of Sophea's sister, Sopheak Chamroeun, Cambodian bassist James "Mao" Sokleap, and Australian guitarist & English teacher Jimmy Baeck. Sarin Chhuon is the sound engineer and producer.

On 13 June 2012, Krom released a 14-song album, Krom: Songs from the Noir. The bilingual album includes songs in English and Khmer, and mixes the traditional Delta blues sound blended with Khmer vocals of. Minko wrote the music and the English lyrics, plays the guitar and occasionally sings the songs. Chamroeun sings in Khmer and English and also wrote the Khmer lyrics. The album was dedicated to Minko's estranged wife, "Wassana Panmanee-Minko (Mam)", who died in Thailand in 2010 and was the inspiration for the song "Bangkok Tattoo". Minko also collaborated with author/novelist Christopher G. Moore singing Moore's words in the lyrics of the song "The Ying". A music video for the same song was produced using the artwork of Bangkok artist Chris Coles.

Engaged with social questions, Minko and Sophea Chamroeun's songs – through moody and poetry-like lyrics and minimalistic and introspective melodies – confront harsh themes such as sexual trafficking and its consequences, and other uncomfortable issues and scenes that are common in the streets of Bangkok and Phnom Penh. Krom's musical inspiration comes from a long and varied list that includes Leonard Cohen, John Fahey, Gustav Mahler, Johnny Cash, Leo Kottke, Beethoven and Chet Baker.

==== 2013 - Neon Dark ====
In October 2013, a second album entitled Krom - NEON DARK was released. The bilingual album contains 12 original songs written by Minko with vocalist Sophea Chamroeun co-writing the Khmer lyrics. Two of the songs feature guest artist Master Kong Nay. Kong Nay sings and plays the chapei dong veng supported by The Chamroeun Sisters (Sophea and Sopheak).

==== Mekong Delta Blues album ====
In 2016, KROM released the Mekong Delta Blues album on the Musik and Film label with album production costs funded by Musik and Film. The album, included the song "Lil Suzie" based on photographs by Jonathan van Smit which show the harsh reality behind the life of a prostitute in South East Asia".

The Mekong Delta Blues album and the song Lil Suzie were submitted by Krom's promotional company Musik and Film for consideration to the 2017 Grammy Awards voting process but were not nominated from among the over 20,000 entries.

==== Lyrics featured in book ====
In July 2012, author Christopher G. Moore included lyrics by Minko from the album Krom – Songs from the Noir in the book Phnom Penh Noir, a noir anthology by various authors released in November 2012.

==== Documentary soundtrack ====
In August 2012, Krom was commissioned to record the soundtrack for an Australian-Khmer documentary 'In Search of Camp 32, a Journey Back to Year Zero'. Co-produced by Australian Gaye Miller, the film recounts the story of a Cambodian Killing Fields survivor Bunhom Chhorn (Hom) in his search to expose the truth behind one of the Khmer Rouge death camps in North Western province, where it is thought that an estimated 30,000 Cambodians perished during the regime of Pol Pot.

== Awards ==
- 2007: Britannica Monthly Blog 'Celebration of Life through Sports' Award
- 2010: Cambodian Prime Minister [Hun Sen] - Gold Medal for Humanitarian Services to Cambodia

== See also ==
- Music of Cambodia
- List of Cambodian singers
