= Roy Snell (footballer) =

Australian rules footballer, born 1901

Personal information
- Full name: Roy Victor Snell
- Born: 25 March 1901; Bright, Victoria
- Died: 3 April 1977 (aged 76); Brunswick, Victoria
- Original team: Brunswick Juniors
- Height: 182 cm (6 ft 0 in)

Playing career^{1}
Years	Club	Games (Goals)
1924	Fitzroy	1 (0)
- ^{1} Playing statistics correct to the end of 1924.

Roy Victor Snell (25 March 1901 – 3 April 1977) was an Australian rules footballer who played with Fitzroy in the Victorian Football League (VFL).
