= Kancoona =

- Town
- Coordinates: 36°33′0″S 146°58′0″E
- Country: Australia
- State: Victoria
- Region: Hume
- LGA: Alpine Shire
- Location: 329 km (204 mi) N of Melbourne; 76 km (47 mi) SE of Wangaratta; 30 km (19 mi) E of Myrtleford

Government
  - State electorate: Benambra
  - Federal division: Indi

Population
  - Total: 210 (2006 census)
- Postcode: 3691

Kancoona is a locality in northeast Victoria, Australia in the Kiewa Valley, 329 kilometres (204 mi) northeast of the state capital, Melbourne. At the 2006 census, Kancoona had a population of 210.

Kancoona Post Office opened on 3 December 1923 and closed in 1968.
