= Upper Gundowring =

- Town
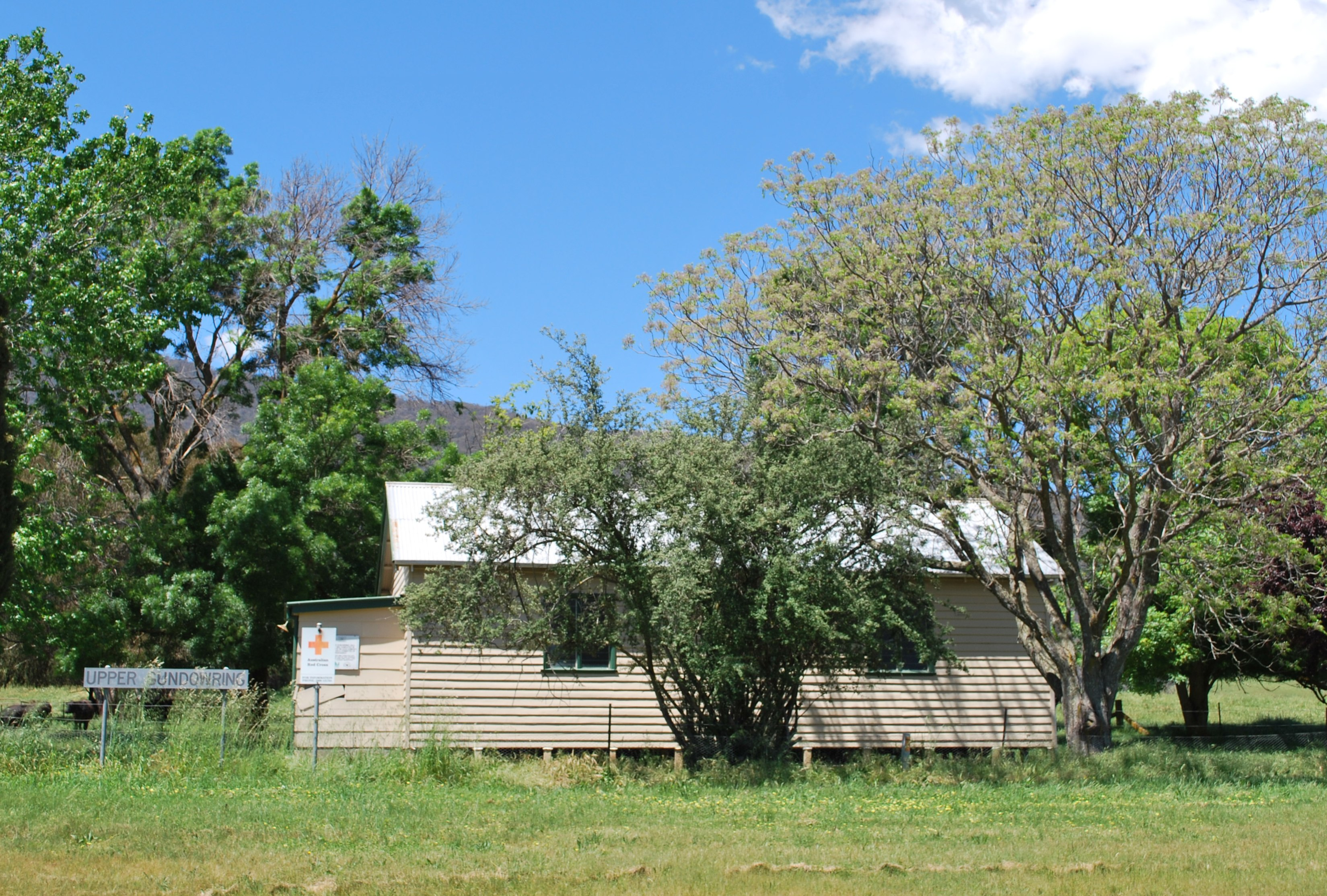
- Public hall at Upper Gundowring, 2009

- Coordinates: 36°29′25″S 147°04′04″E
- Country: Australia
- State: Victoria
- Region: Hume
- LGA: Alpine Shire
- Location: 335 km (208 mi) NE of Melbourne; 50 km (31 mi) S of Wodonga; 8 km (5.0 mi) E of Dederang

Government
  - State electorate: Benambra
  - Federal division: Indi

Population
  - Total: 99 (2016 census)
- Postcode: 3691

Upper Gundowring is a locality in north east Victoria, Australia. The locality is in the Alpine Shire local government area, 335 kilometres (208 mi) north east of the state capital, Melbourne.

At the 2016 census, Upper Gundowring had a population of 99.
