= Abbeyard =

- Town
- Coordinates: 36°54′55″S 146°41′59″E
- Country: Australia
- State: Victoria
- Region: Hume
- LGA: Alpine Shire
- Location: 183 km (114 mi) NE of Melbourne

Government
  - State electorate: Ovens Valley
  - Federal division: Indi

Population
  - Total: 0 (2021 census)
- Postcode: 3737

Abbeyard is located in the north-east part of the state of Victoria, Australia,. It lies north of the Alpine National Park.

At the 2021 census, SAL20001 recorded a population of 0.

Abbeyard is in the local government area of Alpine Shire.

Abbeyard is located within the state electorate of Ovens Valley

For federal matters, the locality falls inside the Division of Indi.

The postcode is 3737 which is shared with 14 localities.
