= Buckland, Victoria =

Buckland
- Town
- Coordinates: 36°45′45″S 146°53′25″E
- Country: Australia
- State: Victoria
- Region: Hume
- LGA: Alpine Shire

Government
  - State electorate: Ovens Valley
  - Federal division: Indi

Population
  - Total: 156 (2021 census)
- Postcode: 3740

Buckland is a locality in Alpine Shire, Victoria, Australia. At the 2021 census, Buckland had a population of 156. The Buckland River runs through the locality. Buckland was named after the pastoralist Thomas Buckland.
