= Harrietville =

- Town
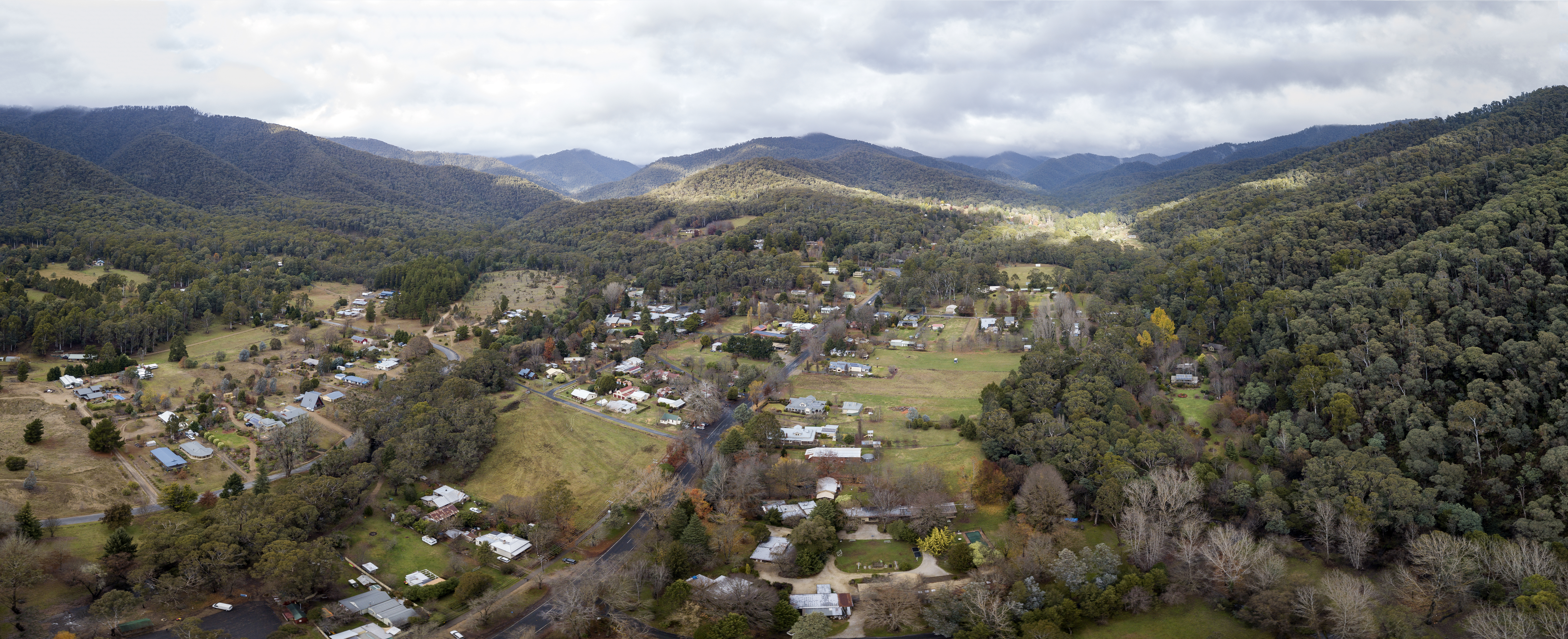
- Aerial panorama of Harrietville

- Interactive map of Harrietville
- Coordinates: 36°55′0″S 147°04′0″E
- Country: Australia
- State: Victoria
- Region: Hume
- LGA: Alpine Shire
- Location: 351 km (218 mi) NE of Melbourne; 105 km (65 mi) SE of Wangaratta; 27 km (17 mi) S of Bright

Government
  - State electorate: Ovens Valley
  - Federal division: Indi
- Elevation: 510 m (1,670 ft)

Population
  - Total: 488 (2021 census)
- Postcode: 3741
- Annual rainfall: 1,036.9 mm (40.82 in)

Harrietville is a town in Victoria, Australia, located on the Great Alpine Road, in the Alpine Shire. At the 2021 census, Harrietville and the surrounding area had a population of 488.

== History ==
Harrietville was named after the first white woman who lived there. Gold miners were there by May 1860 when they formed a Prospecting Association.

The town began as a goldmining settlement during the Victorian Gold Rush, the Post Office opening on 5 July 1865. Alluvial gold was mined initially. Many of the early miners were Chinese. Later, the mining shifted to deep reefs accessed via shafts. A large dredge, known as the Tronoh Monster, also worked extracting alluvial gold from the Ovens River flats. The dredge extracted gravel and created the hole it floated in, dumping the tailings behind it. It made slow progress along the river flats, eventually stopping when rock reefs were contacted at the base of the surrounding mountains. Three large and deep lakes remain near Harrietville where dredging operations ceased, the most known being the Tronoh Dredge Hole which is now a popular spot for swimming, fishing, cycling, and walking

An Athenaeum and free public library opened in 1880.

Harrietville today provides some accommodation for skiers visiting nearby Mount Hotham. The town hosts a bush market in January and on Easter Sunday. Also in January are a European classical music competition, and a lawn mower grand prix. In June the annual Harry T Ville and the Boys Blues Band concert is held at the old Chinese Hotel. In November, the town hosts an annual Bluegrass convention, attracting some hundreds of performers and aficionados.
