= Tawonga South =

- Town
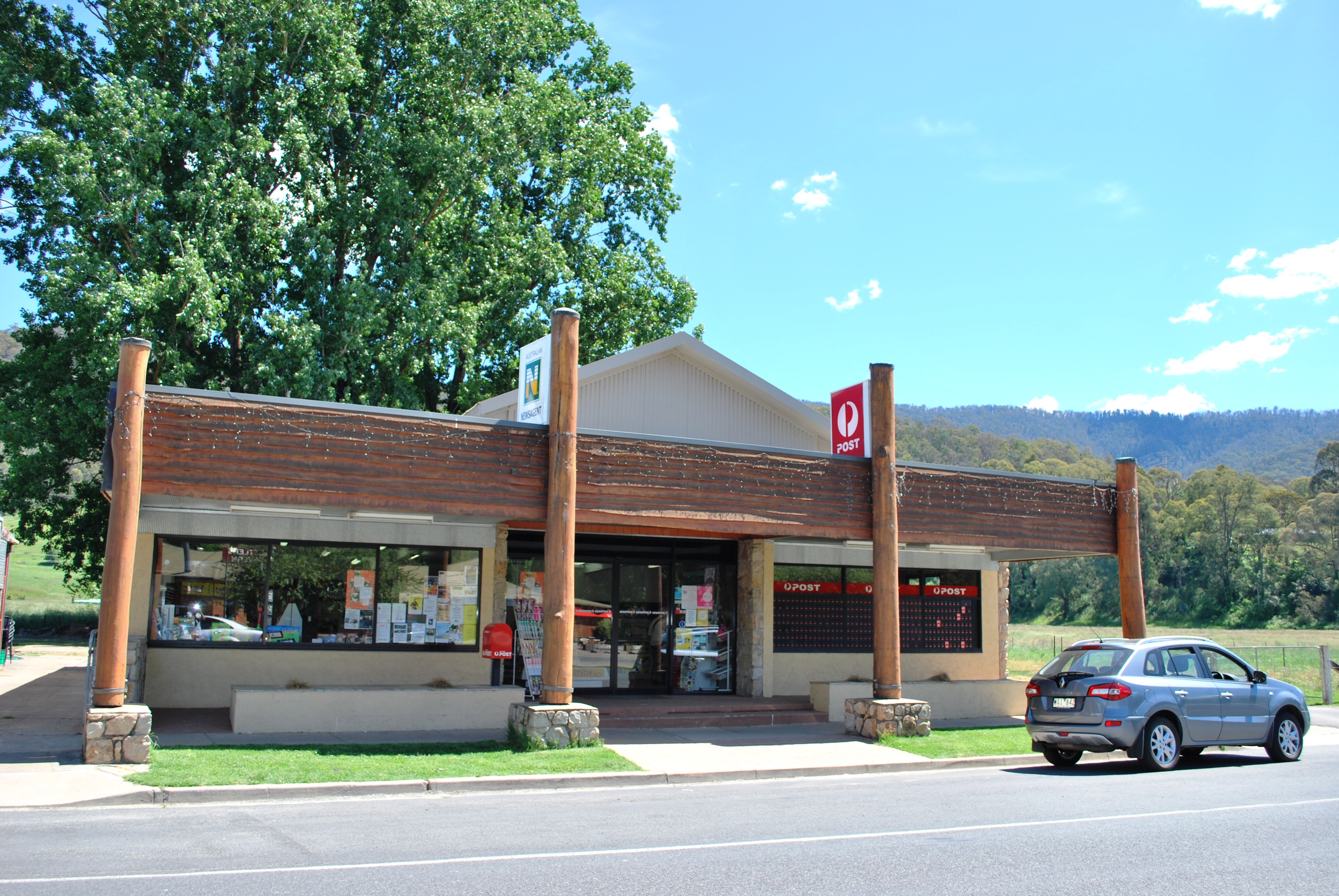
- Post office at Tawonga South, 2009

- Coordinates: 36°43′57″S 147°09′20″E
- Country: Australia
- State: Victoria
- Region: Hume
- LGA: Alpine Shire
- Location: 354 km (220 mi) NE of Melbourne; 83 km (52 mi) $ of Wodonga; 2 km (1.2 mi) NW of Mount Beauty

Government
  - State electorate: Benambra
  - Federal division: Indi

Population
  - Total: 862 (2016 census)
- Postcode: 3698

Tawonga South is a town in north east Victoria, Australia. The town is in the Alpine Shire local government area, 354 kilometres (220 mi) north east of the state capital, Melbourne.

At the 2016 census, Tawonga South had a population of 862.
