= Wandiligong =

- Town
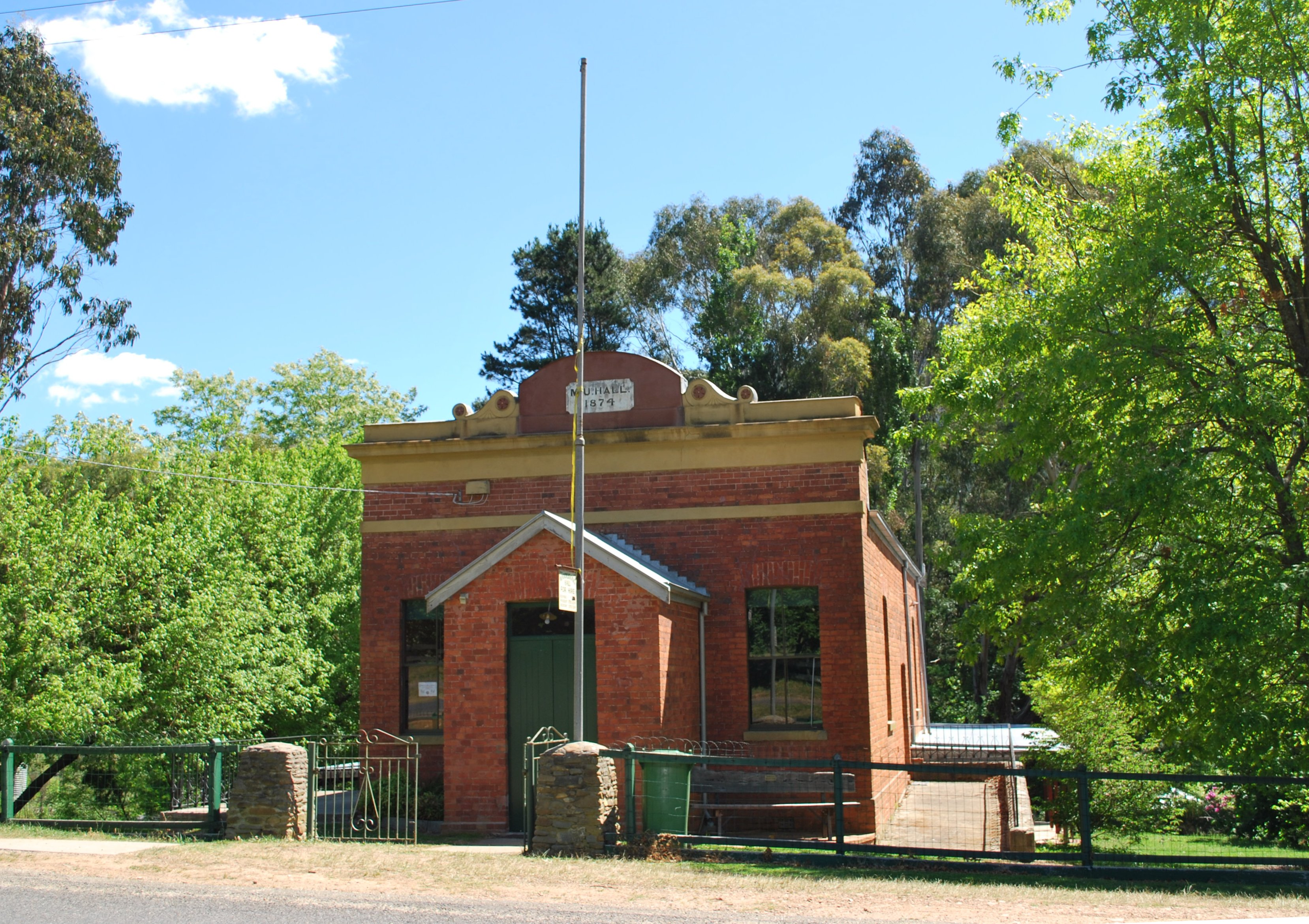
- Manchester Unity hall

- Interactive map of Wandiligong
- Coordinates: 36°45′41″S 146°59′3″E
- Country: Australia
- State: Victoria
- Region: Hume
- LGA: Alpine Shire
- Location: 330 km (210 mi) NE of Melbourne; 82 km (51 mi) SE of Wangaratta; 6 km (3.7 mi) S of Bright

Government
  - State electorate: Ovens Valley
  - Federal division: Indi

Population
  - Total: 522 (2021 census)
- Postcode: 3744

Wandiligong is a town in north-eastern Victoria, Australia. The town is located on Morses Creek and in the Alpine Shire local government area, 6 kilometres (3.7 mi) south of Bright and 330 kilometres (210 mi) north east of the state capital, Melbourne.

At the 2021 Census, Wandiligong had a population of 522. The town was originally established as a mining settlement called Growler's Creek. For such things such as quartz and gold in the area. Its name is derived from the name of a First Nations group who originally occupied the area.

Wandiligong was established in the 1850s during the Victorian gold rush and at one stage the town was home to 2,000 people. The town as a whole is now registered with the National Trust of Australia as a historic landscape and is home to buildings with historic value such as the Manchester Unity hall—built in 1874.

The town is home to one of the largest apple orchards in the Southern Hemisphere. The town is also known to grow tobacco crops as well.

== Notable persons ==
- Harry Bruce (1884–1958), Queensland and Australian politician.
