= Mount Hotham Airport =

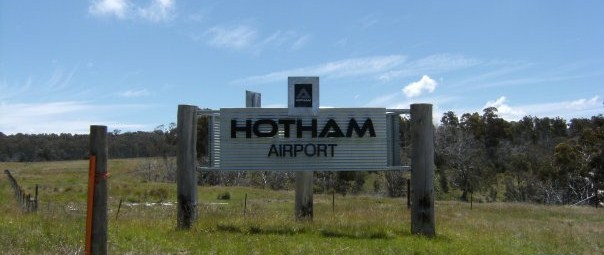
- IATA: MHU; ICAO: YHOT

Summary
- Airport type: Private
- Owner: Grollo family
- Operator: MHSC Transportation Services Pty Ltd
- Serves: Mount Hotham
- Location: Dinner Plain, Victoria, Australia
- Elevation AMSL: 4,260 ft (1,300 m)
- Coordinates: 37°02′51″S 147°20′03″E

Map
- Location in Victoria

Runways
Direction	Length		Surface
Direction	m	ft	Surface
11/29	1,460	4,790	Asphalt
- Sources: Australian AIP and aerodrome chart

Mount Hotham Airport (IATA: MHU, ICAO: YHOT) is a small Australian regional airport, which serves the Victorian ski resort of Mount Hotham. It is Australia's highest-altitude airport.

== History ==
Developed by BCR Asset Management, construction of Mount Hotham Airport began in late 1998. The airport opened on 12 June 1999 with a 700-metre runway. It was officially opened by Premier Steve Bracks on 10 June 2000 by which time the runway had been extended to 1,460 metres.

During the 2000 ski season, Eastern Australia Airlines and Southern Australia Airlines operated flights from Sydney and Melbourne respectively with Dash 8s During the 2001 season Eastern Australia, Southern Australia Airlines and Sunstate Airlines operated flights from Sydney, Melbourne, Brisbane and Newcastle.

Until 2014, QantasLink operated flights from Sydney with Bombardier Q200s. As at 2024, it is only used by charter operators.

In January 2023, the airport was purchased by the Grollo family.

== Incidents ==
On 8 July 2005, a Piper PA-31-350 Navajo Chieftain charter plane crashed into terrain while attempting to make a landing at the airport, killing the pilot and two passengers. Fragments of the aircraft were said to have dropped on the ground at the nearby sub-alpine community of Cobungra.
