= Mount Hotham =

Mountain in Victoria, Australia

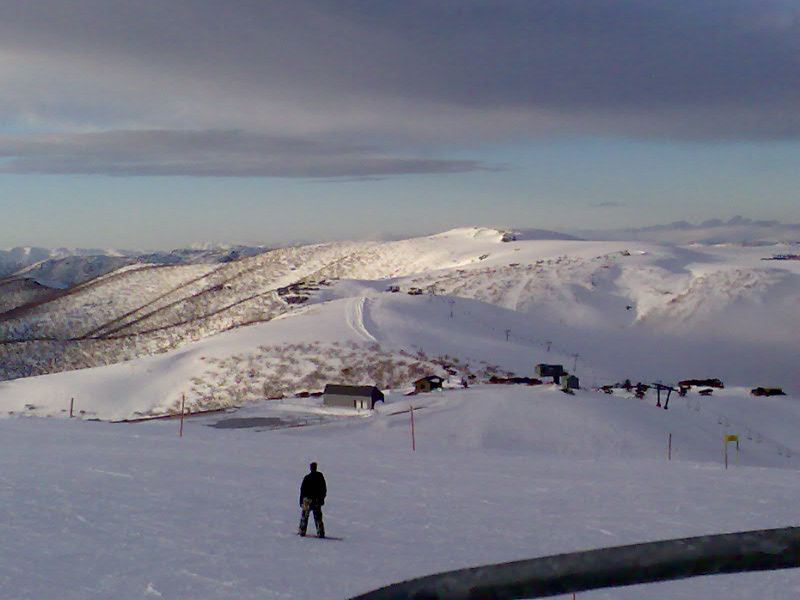
- Mount Hotham, view from the summit in 2007

Highest point
- Elevation: 1,862 metres (6,109 ft) AHD
- Prominence: 242 metres (794 ft) AHD
- Coordinates: 36°58′31″S 147°7′58″E

Geography
- Location within Alpine Shire
- Location: Victoria, Australia
- Parent range: Victorian Alps, Great Dividing Range

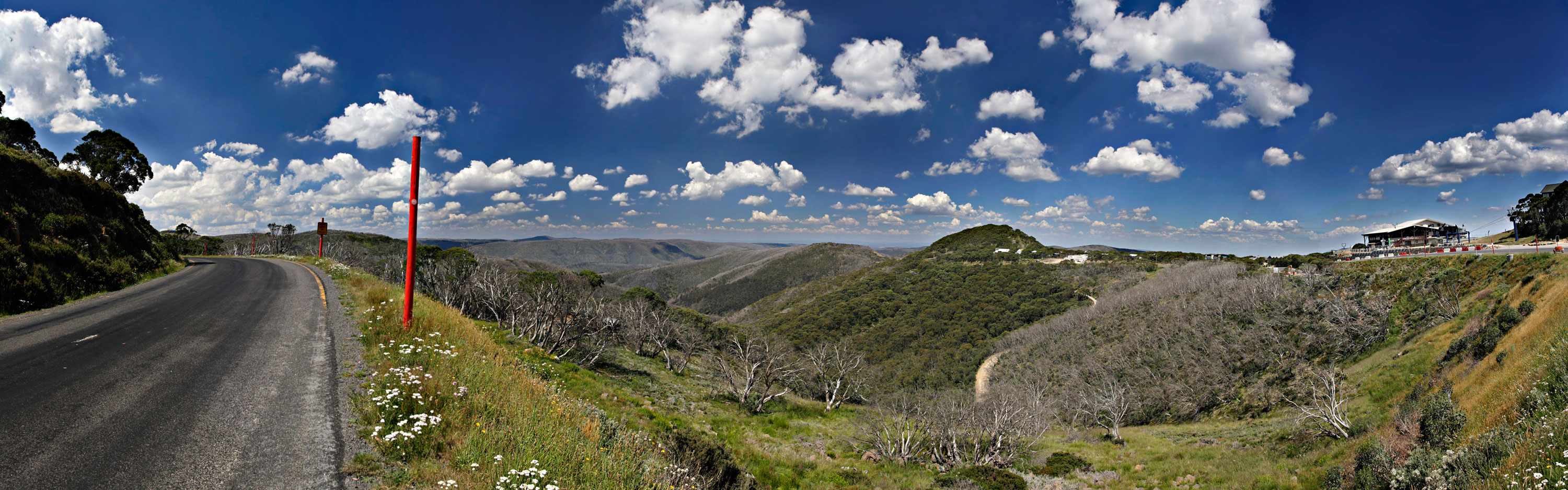
Mount Hotham, in summer

Mount Hotham is a mountain located in the Victorian Alps of the Great Dividing Range, in the Australian state of Victoria. The mountain is located approximately 357 kilometres (222 mi) north east of Melbourne, 746 kilometres (464 mi) from Sydney, and 997 kilometres (620 mi) from Adelaide by road. The nearest major road to the mountain is the Great Alpine Road. The mountain is named after Charles Hotham, Governor of Victoria from 1854 to 1855.

Mount Hotham's summit rises to an altitude of 1,862 metres (6,109 ft) AHD.

Mount Hotham Alpine Resort, a commercial alpine resort, is located on the slopes of Mount Hotham summit and nearby mountains.

Administratively, the mountain is within Mount Hotham Alpine Resort unincorporated area, land which is managed by Alpine Resorts Victoria. This unincorporated area is surrounded by Alpine Shire

== Climate ==
As with most of the Australian Alps, Mount Hotham's climate is, compared to the bulk of Australia, cold throughout the year; with particularly cold maximum temperatures, and Mount Hotham is one of very few areas in Australia that frequently records maximum temperatures below freezing. Mount Hotham is also one of the only places in Australia to have never recorded a temperature above 30 °C (86 °F); during the early 2009 southeastern Australia heat wave, whilst most of the state sweltered above 45 °C (113 °F), the mountain's peak temperature was a mild 28.1 °C (82.6 °F).

Snow occurs frequently and heavily, and sub-freezing maximum temperatures can be recorded throughout the year—even in high summer. However, due to frequent winter cloud and the mountain's exposed position, a temperature below −10 °C (14 °F) has only occurred once since records began in 1990. Mount Hotham receives an average of 66.1 snowy days annually. It is the coldest weather station on mainland Australia by maximum temperatures.

Owing to its short, cool summers and long, cold winters, Mount Hotham has a Subpolar oceanic climate (Cfc) bordering on a Subarctic climate (Dfc).

Climate data for Mount Hotham (1990–2022); 1,849 m AMSL; 36.98° S, 147.13° E
Month	Jan	Feb	Mar	Apr	May	Jun	Jul	Aug	Sep	Oct	Nov	Dec	Year
Record high °C (°F)	28.2 (82.8)	28.1 (82.6)	24.4 (75.9)	26.7 (80.1)	19.8 (67.6)	11.6 (52.9)	8.7 (47.7)	10.7 (51.3)	13.7 (56.7)	19.0 (66.2)	23.6 (74.5)	26.3 (79.3)	28.2 (82.8)
Mean daily maximum °C (°F)	16.6 (61.9)	15.8 (60.4)	13.0 (55.4)	8.5 (47.3)	4.6 (40.3)	1.4 (34.5)	−0.1 (31.8)	0.5 (32.9)	3.6 (38.5)	7.6 (45.7)	11.3 (52.3)	14.0 (57.2)	8.1 (46.5)
Daily mean °C (°F)	12.4 (54.3)	11.9 (53.4)	9.4 (48.9)	5.6 (42.1)	2.3 (36.1)	−0.5 (31.1)	−1.9 (28.6)	−1.5 (29.3)	1.0 (33.8)	4.2 (39.6)	7.5 (45.5)	9.9 (49.8)	5.0 (41.0)
Mean daily minimum °C (°F)	8.2 (46.8)	7.9 (46.2)	5.8 (42.4)	2.7 (36.9)	−0.1 (31.8)	−2.4 (27.7)	−3.7 (25.3)	−3.5 (25.7)	−1.6 (29.1)	0.8 (33.4)	3.7 (38.7)	5.8 (42.4)	2.0 (35.5)
Record low °C (°F)	−3.7 (25.3)	−3.8 (25.2)	−4.3 (24.3)	−8.2 (17.2)	−7.4 (18.7)	−9.1 (15.6)	−8.8 (16.2)	−10.4 (13.3)	−9.2 (15.4)	−8.4 (16.9)	−7.0 (19.4)	−5.4 (22.3)	−10.4 (13.3)
Average precipitation mm (inches)	105.7 (4.16)	99.7 (3.93)	117.2 (4.61)	103.4 (4.07)	138.4 (5.45)	124.0 (4.88)	128.7 (5.07)	120.5 (4.74)	129.2 (5.09)	139.7 (5.50)	150.0 (5.91)	123.2 (4.85)	1,489.4 (58.64)
Average precipitation days (≥ 0.2 mm)	11.0	10.9	12.6	12.9	14.7	14.6	18.6	16.4	15.2	13.5	13.0	11.5	164.9
Average afternoon relative humidity (%)	63	65	67	76	82	89	89	88	84	76	69	64	76
Source: Australian Bureau of Meteorology; Mount Hotham

== Visiting in winter ==
During the declared snow season (usually from the King's Birthday long weekend in June till the first weekend in October), it is a legal requirement to carry diamond pattern wheel chains and fit them if directed. There are penalties for not doing so. The steep and exposed portions of the Great Alpine Road between Harrietville and Hotham Heights means that in some conditions, vehicles (particularly two wheel drive vehicles) are not able to travel safely without these wheel chains.

Visitors need to purchase an entry permit to enter the resort during winter. The resort entry fee contributes to essential services for guests around the mountain, including ski patrol, the free village buses, snow clearing of car parks in the village, waste management and environmental initiatives.

== Gallery ==
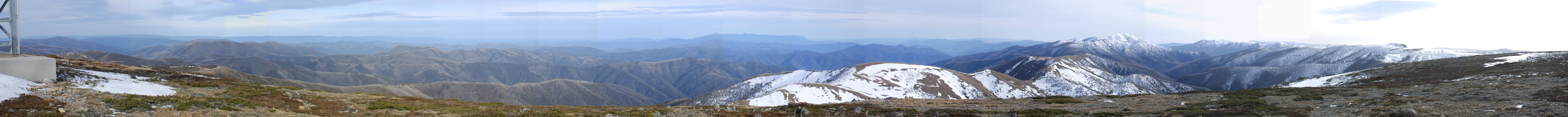
Mount Hotham summit panorama to the north

== See also ==
- Alpine National Park
- List of mountains in Australia § Victoria
