= Alpine Shire =

- Local government area
- Location in Victoria

- Interactive map of Alpine Shire
- Country: Australia
- State: Victoria
- Region: Hume
- Established: 1994
- Council seat: Bright

Government
  - Mayor: Cr Sarah Nicholas
  - State electorate: Ovens Valley
  - Federal division: Indi

Area
  - Total: 4,788 km^{2} (1,849 sq mi)

Population
  - Total: 13,235 (2021 census)
  - Density: 2.7642/km^{2} (7.1593/sq mi)
- Gazetted: 18 November 1994
- Website: Alpine Shire
LGAs around Alpine Shire
Wangaratta	Indigo	Towong
Wangaratta	Alpine Shire	East Gippsland
Mansfield	Wellington	East Gippsland

The Alpine Shire is a local government area in the Hume region of Victoria, Australia, located in the north-east part of the state. It covers an area of 4,788 square kilometres (1,849 mi^{2}) and in August 2021 had a population of 13,235.

It includes the towns of Bright, Dinner Plain, Harrietville, Mount Beauty, Myrtleford and Porepunkah. There are two unincorporated areas surrounded by the shire: the Mount Hotham and Falls Creek Alpine Resorts.

The Shire is governed and administered by the Alpine Shire Council; its seat of local government and administrative centre is located at the council headquarters in Bright. It also has service centres located in Dinner Plain, Mount Beauty and Myrtleford.

Over 90% of the Shire is public land. The Shire is home to two major national parks, the Alpine National Park and Mount Buffalo National Park. The Shire's economy is based on tourism, agriculture and forestry.

== History ==
The Alpine Shire was formed in 1994 from the amalgamation of the Shire of Bright, the Shire of Myrtleford, the Gapsted and northern Mudgegonga districts of the United Shire of Beechworth, the Merriang district and the Buffalo Valley west of the Buffalo River from the Shire of Oxley, the Dederang district of the Shire of Yackandandah, and the Dinner Plain district of the Shire of Omeo.

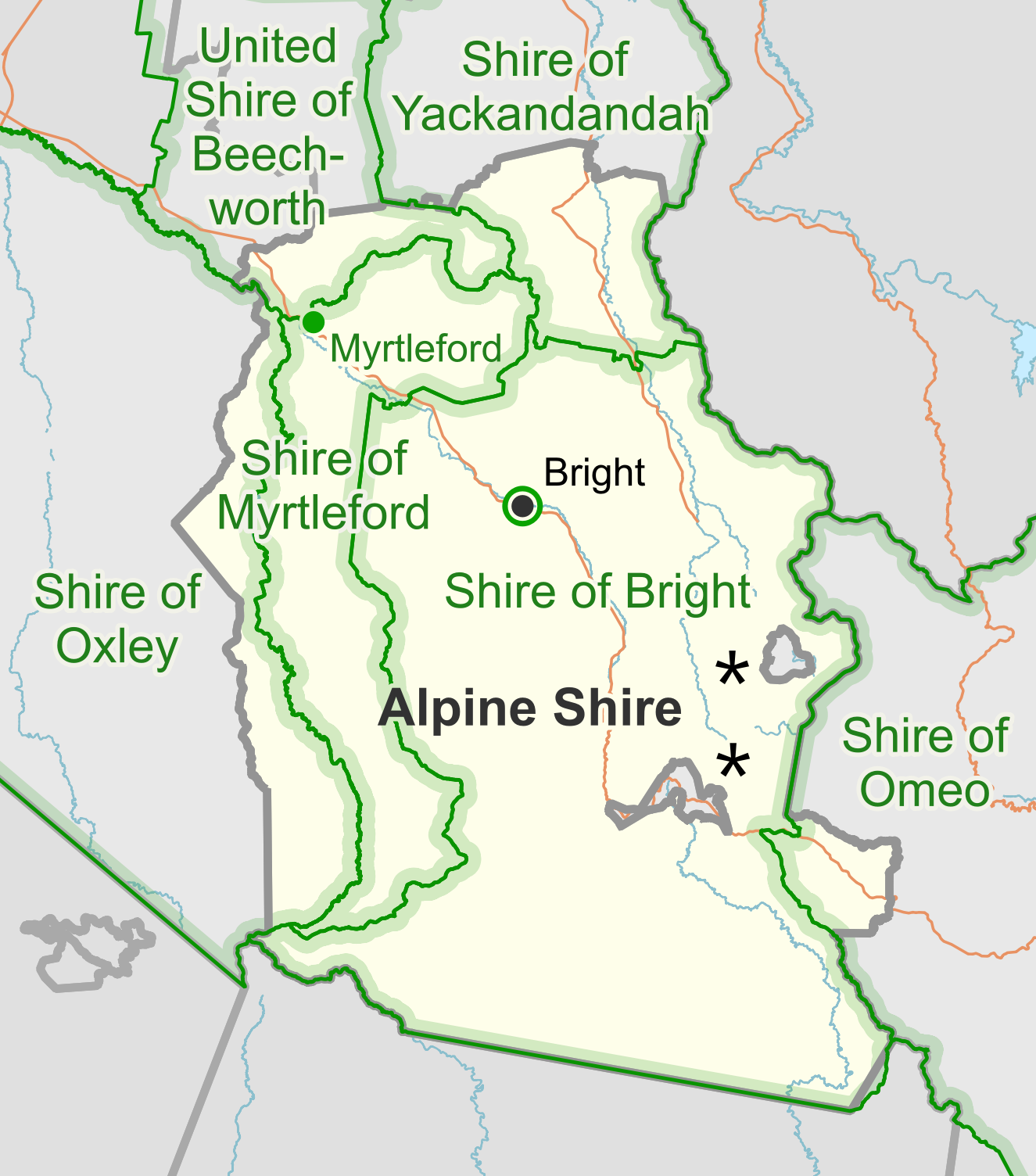
The Shire's predecessor LGAs (green) as they were in 1994. The administrative centres of the former LGAs are marked by green dots. 🞲 The Falls Creek and Mount Hotham Alpine Resorts were excised in 1997

== Council ==
=== Current composition ===
The council is composed of seven councillors elected to represent an unsubdivided municipality.

Ward	Councillor	Notes
Unsubdivided	Sarah Nicholas	
Unsubdivided	Peter Smith	
Unsubdivided	John Andersen	
Unsubdivided	Dave Byrne	
Unsubdivided	Gareth Graham	
Unsubdivided	Jean-Pierre Ronco	
Unsubdivided	Noah Tanzen	

=== Administration and governance ===
The council meets in the council chambers at the council headquarters in the Bright Municipal Offices, which is also the location of the council's administrative activities. It also provides customer services at both its administrative centre in Bright, and its service centres in Dinner Plain, Mount Beauty and Myrtleford.

=== 2020 election results ===
2020 Victorian local elections: Alpine
Party	Candidate	Votes	%	±%
Independent	Ron Janas (elected 1)	1,525	17.15	
Independent	Kelli Prime (elected 2)	1,157	13.01	
Independent	Tony Keeble (elected 3)	973	10.94	
Animal Justice	Charlie Vincent (elected 4)	812	9.13	+9.13
Independent	Katarina Chalwell (elected 5)	749	8.42	
Independent	Sarah Nicholas (elected 6)	642	7.22	
Independent	John Forsyth (elected 7)	604	7.29	
Independent	Daryl Pearce	521	5.86	
Independent	Simon Kelley	506	5.69	
Independent	Mario Vaccaro	483	5.43	
Independent	Mickey Fletcher	430	4.84	
Independent	Kitty Knappstein	284	3.19	
Independent	Jean-Pierre Ronco	205	2.31	
Total formal votes		8,891	95.04	
Informal votes		464	4.96	
Turnout		9,355	83.76	

== Townships and localities ==
In the 2021 census, the shire had a population of 13,235, up from 12,337 in the 2016 national census.

Population
Locality	2016	2021
Abbeyard	0	4
Barwidgee	106	96
Bogong	5	8
Bright	2,406	2,620
Buckland	135	156
Buffalo River	255	285
Cobungra^	53	58
Coral Bank	83	88
Dandongadale	3	8
Dargo^	99	105
Dederang	167	198
Dinner Plain	230	128
Eurobin	212	239
Falls Creek^	293	326
Freeburgh	110	136
Gapsted	173	156
Germantown	0	0
Glen Creek	54	59
Gundowring^	214	208
Harrietville	338	488
Havilah	21	22
Hotham Heights	196	128
Kancoona	84	74
Kergunyah South	58	76
Merriang	178	182
Merriang South	41	43
Mongans Bridge	35	49
Mount Beauty	824	910
Mount Buffalo	0	5
Mudgegonga^	172	184
Myrtleford	3,193	3,285
Nug Nug	21	36
Ovens	219	197
Porepunkah	941	1,024
Rosewhite	134	141
Running Creek	42	36
Selwyn	0	0
Smoko	46	56
Tawonga	574	568
Tawonga South	862	1,012
Upper Gundowring	99	120
Wandiligong	453	522
Wongungarra^	0	0
Wonnangatta	0	0

^ – Territory divided with another LGA

== See also ==
- List of localities in Victoria
- List of places on the Victorian Heritage Register in Alpine Shire
