= Myrtleford =

- Town
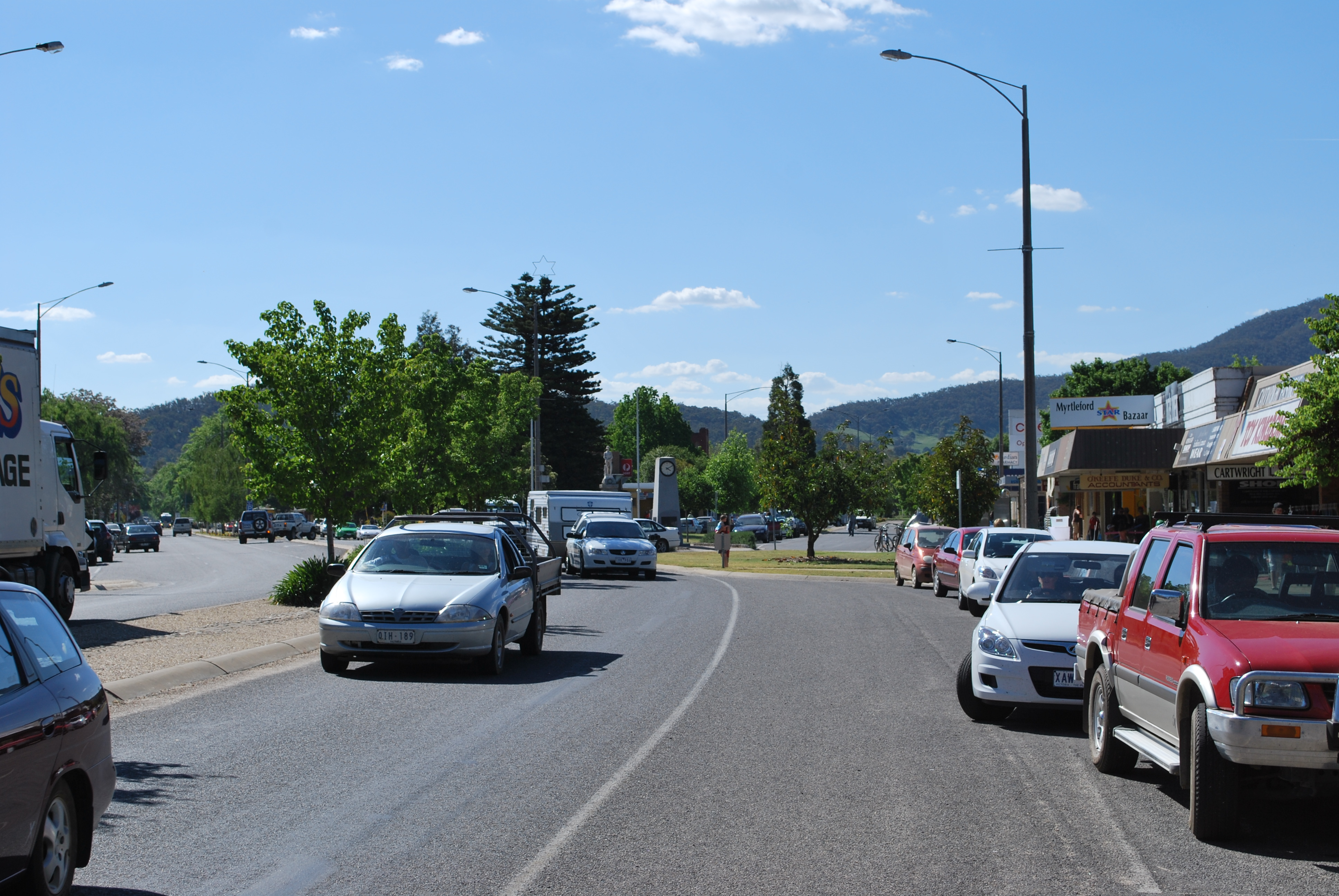
- Myrtleford

- Interactive map of Myrtleford
- Coordinates: 36°33′0″S 146°43′0″E
- Country: Australia
- State: Victoria
- Region: Hume
- LGA: Alpine Shire
- Location: 282 km (175 mi) NE of Melbourne; 47 km (29 mi) SE of Wangaratta; 28 km (17 mi) S of Beechworth; 32 km (20 mi) NW of Bright
- Established: 1858

Government
  - State electorate: Ovens Valley
  - Federal division: Indi

Area
  - Total: 80.5 km^{2} (31.1 sq mi)
- Elevation: 211 m (692 ft)

Population
  - Total: 3,285 (2021 census)
  - Density: 40.807/km^{2} (105.69/sq mi)
- Postcode: 3737
- Mean max temp: 21.6 °C (70.9 °F)
- Mean min temp: 6.5 °C (43.7 °F)
- Annual rainfall: 905.2 mm (35.64 in)
Localities around Myrtleford
Merriang	Gapsted	Barwidgee
Eurobin	Myrtleford	Rosewhite
Buffalo River	Nug Nug	Ovens

Myrtleford is a town in northeast Victoria, Australia, 282 km (175 miles) northeast of Melbourne and 47 km (29 miles) southeast of Wangaratta. Myrtleford is part of the Alpine Shire local government area and in 2021 the town had a population of 3,285.

== History ==
The post office opened on 26 July 1858 as Myrtle Creek and was renamed Myrtleford in 1871. The road through Myrtleford was then called the Buckland Road, today it is known as the Great Alpine Road.

During World War II No. 5 Prisoner of War Camp was established near Myrtleford. It accommodated Italian prisoners of war from mid-1942 until they were repatriated or became emigrants to Australia in 1946. At its peak, 1,000 POWs were located in the camp.

== Sport ==
Myrtleford Football Club compete in the Ovens & Murray Football League.

Myrtleford Savoy SC is a soccer club who compete in the Albury Wodonga Football Association. They are based at Savoy Park.

Myrtleford Speedway is a speedway venue located on the northern edge of the town, off Odonnnell Avenue and adjacent to the golf course. It has also been used for motorcycle speedway and has hosted important events, including the Australian qualifying round of the Speedway World Championship in 1990 and the final of the Victorian Individual Championship in 1989/1990 and 1992/1993.

== Features ==
The rich soil of the region is known for its fresh local produce including vegetables, berries, nuts and olives. Myrtleford is also famous for its vineyards spread across the Alpine Valleys wine region which includes production of Italian Michelini Wines and Gapsted Wines. The area has abundant greenery in the form of parks such as the Jubilee Park and Rotary Park.

== Climate ==
Myrtleford has a temperate climate with more rain in winter than in summer and a high diurnal range throughout the warmer half of the year. Under the Köppen climate classification, the town has an oceanic climate (Cfb).

Climate data for Myrtleford Post Office (1897–1969); 223 m AMSL; 36.57° S, 146.73° E
Month	Jan	Feb	Mar	Apr	May	Jun	Jul	Aug	Sep	Oct	Nov	Dec	Year
Mean daily maximum °C (°F)	30.8 (87.4)	30.0 (86.0)	27.3 (81.1)	21.8 (71.2)	17.0 (62.6)	13.5 (56.3)	12.6 (54.7)	14.5 (58.1)	17.9 (64.2)	20.9 (69.6)	24.5 (76.1)	28.5 (83.3)	21.6 (70.9)
Mean daily minimum °C (°F)	11.7 (53.1)	11.8 (53.2)	9.3 (48.7)	6.0 (42.8)	4.1 (39.4)	2.4 (36.3)	2.1 (35.8)	2.8 (37.0)	3.8 (38.8)	6.0 (42.8)	8.0 (46.4)	10.1 (50.2)	6.5 (43.7)
Average precipitation mm (inches)	44.8 (1.76)	47.8 (1.88)	60.1 (2.37)	61.3 (2.41)	84.3 (3.32)	104.1 (4.10)	106.5 (4.19)	102.0 (4.02)	83.2 (3.28)	91.0 (3.58)	59.6 (2.35)	60.1 (2.37)	905.2 (35.64)
Average precipitation days	5.0	4.6	5.8	6.9	10.0	12.1	13.3	13.3	11.1	10.5	7.3	6.5	106.4
Average afternoon relative humidity (%)	32	37	42	48	62	68	68	59	54	51	44	35	50

== Notable residents ==
- Gary Ablett Snr, Australian Rules footballer.
- Cris Bonacci, Musician, Producer.
- Jack Crisp, Australian Rules footballer.
- Joff Ellen, comedian and actor.
- Merv Hughes, Australian Cricketer.
- Sam Kekovich, Australian Rules footballer.
- Alby Lowerson, WWI Victoria Cross recipient.
- Steve Mautone, retired professional football association goalkeeper.
- Chloe McConville, Australian racing cyclist and former cross-country skier.
- Malcolm Milne, olympic skier.
- Ross Milne, olympic skier.
- Christopher Minko, musician.
- Guy Rigoni, Australian Rules footballer.
