= Electoral district of Ovens Valley =

State electoral district of Victoria, Australia

Coordinates: 36.61°S 146.51°E

Ovens Valley Victoria—Legislative Assembly
- Interactive map of electoral district boundaries from the 2022 state election
- State: Victoria
- Created: 2014
- MP: Tim McCurdy
- Party: National Party
- Namesake: Ovens River
- Electors: 43,200 (2018)
- Area: 10,558 km^{2} (4,076.5 sq mi)
- Demographic: Rural
Electorates around Ovens Valley:
Shepparton	New South Wales	Benambra
Euroa	Ovens Valley	Benambra
Eildon	Gippsland East	Gippsland East

The electoral district of Ovens Valley is an electoral district of the Victorian Legislative Assembly in Australia. It was created in the redistribution of electoral boundaries in 2013, and came into effect at the 2014 state election.

It largely covers areas from the abolished district of Murray Valley, centring on the city of Wangaratta. It includes the towns of Yarrawonga, Cobram, and other towns in the local government areas of Moira, Wangaratta, and Alpine.

The abolished seat of Murray Valley was held by Nationals MP Tim McCurdy, who retained the new seat at the 2014 election.

== Members ==
Member	Party	Term
Tim McCurdy	National	2014–present

== Election results ==
2022 Victorian state election: Ovens Valley
Party	Candidate	Votes	%	±%
National	Tim McCurdy	21,057	52.1	+10.4
Labor	Zuvele Leschen	8,369	20.7	+0.0
Greens	Zoe Kromar	3,625	9.0	+4.3
Liberal Democrats	Julian Fidge	2,995	7.4	+7.4
Freedom	Mark Bugge	1,932	4.8	+4.8
Family First	Anna Wise	1,403	3.5	+3.5
Animal Justice	Aisha Slater	1,009	2.5	+2.5
Total formal votes		40,382	95.1	+0.4
Informal votes		2,114	4.9	−0.4
Turnout		42,496	88.3	−2.1
Two-party-preferred result
National	Tim McCurdy	27,395	67.8	+5.7
Labor	Zuvele Leschen	12,987	32.2	−5.7
National hold		Swing	+5.7	
