= Swiss Italians of Australia =

Swiss Italians of Australia are the Italian-speaking Swiss who settled in Australia during the 1850s and 1860s and their descendants who identified as such.

The Swiss immigrants were from the canton of Ticino and the southern part of Graubünden. Many initially settled in the area around Daylesford, Victoria. A community centred around the Savoia (Spring Creek) Hotel and the Macaroni Factory. The Savoia is named after the royal family of unified Italy. An Italian reading library was located at the hotel and pasta was made opposite in Lucini's Macaroni Factory which was also home to the Democratic Club. Lucini's moved from Lonsdale Street, Melbourne in 1865, where they had set up as the first pasta factory in Australia in 1864. Vanzetta's bakery supplied bread to the community and Crippa, Perini, and the Gervasoni's (Yandoit Creek) produced wine.

Their influence remains in the township of Hepburn Springs in the names of residents, the names of Locarno Springs, Savoia Hotel, Parma House and buildings, Perinis and Bellinzona. The Swiss Italian Festa, first held in 1993, celebrates the history, culture and lifestyle of Swiss and Italian settlers. In 2007, the Melbourne Immigration Museum featured a display entitled Wine Water and Stone reflecting Swiss and Italian heritage.

An associated delicacy is bullboar, a sausage made from beef, pork, garlic, and spices. In 2005 Daylesford Secondary College came in second place in the Australian Broadcasting Corporation's Young Gourmets by making bullboars from the Gervasoni and Sartori recipes.

== Swiss Italian heritage places ==
- Elvizia Homestead Yandoit
- Hepburn Mineral Springs Reserve
- Former Macaroni Factory Hepburn Springs
- Parma House Hepburn Springs
- Swimming Pool Hepburn Springs
- Former Carlo Gervasoni Homestead Yandoit Creek

== Swiss Italian places of significance ==
Lavandula Swiss Italian Farm in Shepherds Flat (about 10 km north of Daylesford) was a dairy farm established by Aquilino Tinetti (born 1835 d. 1905) in the 1860s. He married Maria Virgilia Martina Capriroli (born 1850 d. 1932) and they had 13 children. The dairy farm ceased about 1975. The property was purchased in the late 1980s, the buildings restored and the property revived as a lavender farm and European-style gardens. It offers guided tours of the original stone farmhouse and a history room.

== Notable descendants of Swiss Italians in Australia ==
Note: While of Swiss Italian descent, it is unverified whether the following people identified as such.

- Ron Barassi – Melbourne premiership player in 1955, 1956, 1957, 1959, 1960, 1964; Melbourne Captain 1960–64; All Australian 1956, 1958, 1961; Carlton premiership coach 1968, 1970 North Melbourne premiership coach 1975, 1977; Australian Football Hall of Fame; Sport Australia Hall of Fame (2006); VFL/AFL Italian Team of the Century (coach) 2007; 2009 Victorian of the Year
- Vern Barberis – Olympic Bronze Medalist and Commonwealth Games Gold Medalist in weightlifting
- Mark Beretta – Ten-time champion water-skier and sportscaster
- Nellie Louise Carbasse, better known by her stage name "Louise Lovely", the first Australian actress to find success in Hollywood
- Carlo Catani – Civil engineer for Victoria's Public Works Department who oversaw the following projects: draining the Koo-Wee-Rup Swamp, widening and improving the Yarra River upstream from Princes Bridge, laying out and planting the Alexandra Gardens, roads to Arthurs Seat and Mount Donna Buang, Murray River levees in Strathmerton, Lake Catani in Mount Buffalo National Park, reclamation of the foreshore of St Kilda. There is a bronze bust of Catani at the foot of Schefferle's memorial clock tower on the St. Kilda Esplanade.
- Robert de Castella – Long-distance runner, 1983 World Marathon Champion, 1982 and 1986 Commonwealth Games Marathon Champion
- Jack Gervasoni – Australian Rules Footballer (Fitzroy) Captain Coach (Northcote); educator; Mayor of Kew
- Len Incigneri – Australian Rules Footballer (South Melbourne) and Captain Coach (Richmond)
- Steve Moneghetti- Olympian and Commonwealth Games Gold Medallist
- Tony Polinelli – Australian Rules Footballer, Premiership player (Geelong) and runner up in the Stawell Gift
- Samuel Victor Alberto Zelman – Musician and conductor, and founder of the Melbourne Symphony Orchestra
- Victor Zelman – Artist
