= Euhesma catanii =

Scientific classification
- Kingdom: Animalia
- Phylum: Arthropoda
- Clade: Pancrustacea
- Class: Insecta
- Order: Hymenoptera
- Family: Colletidae
- Genus: Euhesma
- Species: E. catanii

Binomial name
- Euhesma catanii (Rayment, 1949)

Synonyms
- Euryglossa catanii Rayment, 1949

Species of bee

Euhesma catanii is a species of bee in the family Colletidae and the subfamily Euryglossinae. It is endemic to Australia. It was described in 1949 by Australian entomologist Tarlton Rayment.

== Etymology ==
The specific epithet catanii honours civil engineer Carlo Catani for his work on the Mount Buffalo plateau.

== Description ==
The male body length is 6.5 mm; the colouring is mainly black and purple.

== Distribution and habitat ==
The species occurs in Victoria. The type locality is Reed’s Lookout, Mount Buffalo.

== Behaviour ==
The adults are flying mellivores. Flowering plants visited by the bees include Stylidium graminifolium.
