= Prostanthera monticola =

Buffalo mint-bush

Scientific classification
- Kingdom: Plantae
- Clade: Tracheophytes
- Clade: Angiosperms
- Clade: Eudicots
- Clade: Asterids
- Order: Lamiales
- Family: Lamiaceae
- Genus: Prostanthera
- Species: P. monticola

Binomial name
- Prostanthera monticola B.J.Conn.
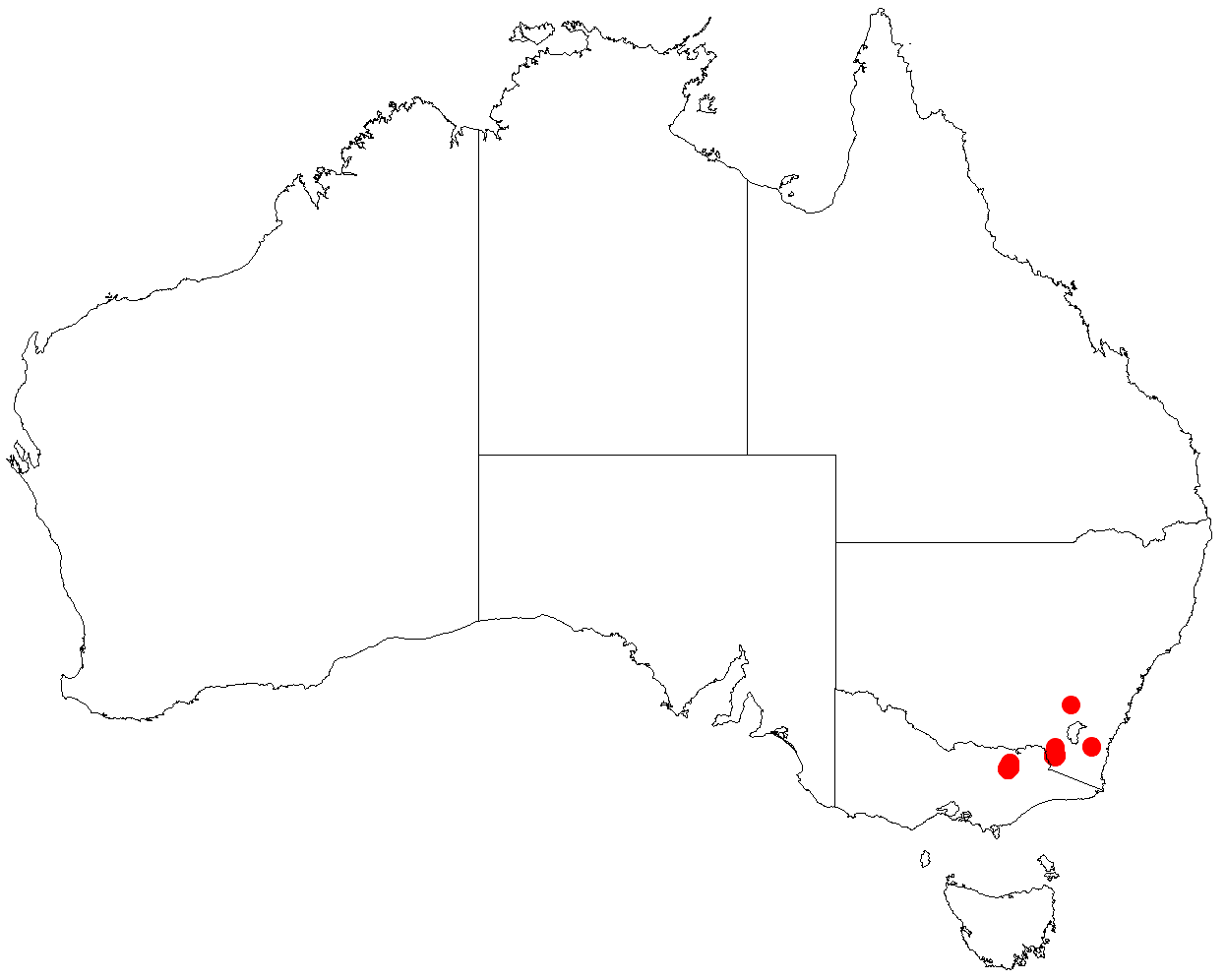
- Occurrence data from AVH

Species of flowering plant

Prostanthera monticola, commonly known as Buffalo mint-bush, is a species of flowering plant in the family Lamiaceae and is endemic to higher areas of south-eastern Australia. It is a sprawling, open shrub with red, hairy branches, lance-shaped to narrow elliptic leaves and pale bluish-green to grey-green flowers with dark purple-blue veins.

== Description ==
Prostanthera monticola is a sprawling, open shrub that typically grows to a height of 0.3–2 m (1 ft 0 in – 6 ft 7 in) with red, hairy, often ridged branches. The leaves are lance-shaped or egg-shaped to narrow elliptic and with a grooved upper surface, 15–50 mm (0.59–1.97 in) long and 5–13 mm (0.20–0.51 in) wide on a petiole 2–5 mm (0.079–0.197 in) long. The flowers are arranged singly on leaf axils on a pedicel 2–3 mm (0.079–0.118 in) long and covered with white hairs and with bracteoles 10–18 mm (0.39–0.71 in) long at the base. The sepals are green, and 10–15 mm (0.39–0.59 in) long forming a tube 5–6 mm (0.20–0.24 in) long with two lobes 6–9 mm (0.24–0.35 in) long. The petals are pale bluish-green to grey-green and with dark purple-blue veins, 30–35 mm (1.2–1.4 in) long, with two lips. The lower central lobe is 8–10 mm (0.31–0.39 in) long and about 10 mm (0.39 in) wide and the lower side lobes are 7–8 mm (0.28–0.31 in) long and about 5 mm (0.20 in) wide. The upper lip is egg-shaped and with three faint lobes and is about 10 mm (0.39 in) long and 12 mm (0.47 in) wide. Flowering occurs in summer.

== Taxonomy ==
Prostanthera monticola was formally described in 1984 by Barry Conn in the Journal of the Adelaide Botanic Gardens, based on plant materials collected in 1980 at Crystal Brook Falls, Mount Buffalo in Victoria.

== Distribution and habitat ==
Buffalo mint-bush occurs on granitic soils in forests from Kosciuszko National Park in New South Wales southwards to north-east Victoria in the Mount Buffalo National Park at altitudes of 530–1,850 m (1,740–6,070 ft). Associated tree species include Eucalyptus delegatensis, E. pauciflora and E. stellulata.
