= List of acts of the Parliament of Victoria from 1904 =

This is a list of acts of the Parliament of Victoria, Australia for the year 1904.

== 1904 ==
Short title, or popular name	Citation	Royal assent
Long title
	4 Edw. VII. No. 1897	12 July 1904
An Act to apply out of the Consolidated Revenue the sum of Nine hundred and twenty-eight thousand and sixty-three pounds to the service of the year One thousand nine hundred and four and One thousand nine hundred and five.
Legal Practitioners Reciprocity Act 1904 (repealed)	4 Edw. VII. No. 1898	16 August 1904
An Act to amend the Legal Practitioners Reciprocity Act 1903. (Note: Legal Practitioners Reciprocity Act 1903 (3 Edw. VII. No. 1887)) (Repealed by Legal Profession Practice Act 1915 (6 Geo. V. No. 2681))
Railways Standing Committee Act 1904 (repealed)	4 Edw. VII. No. 1899	16 August 1904
An Act to amend the Law relating to the Railways Standing Committee. (Repealed by Railways Standing Committee Act 1915 (6 Geo. V. No. 2717))
	4 Edw. VII. No. 1900	26 August 1904
An Act to apply out of the Consolidated Revenue the sum of Thirty-two thousand four hundred and two pounds to the service of the year One thousand nine hundred and three and One thousand nine hundred and four.
Debenture Conversion Act 1904	4 Edw. VII. No. 1901	6 September 1904
An Act to provide for converting a certain portion of the Public Debt of Victoria into Debentures.
Stamps Act 1904 (repealed)	4 Edw. VII. No. 1902	6 September 1904
An Act to amend the Stamps Acts. (Repealed by Stamps Act 1915 (6 Geo. V. No. 2728))
Local Government Act 1904 (repealed)	4 Edw. VII. No. 1903	6 September 1904
An Act to amend the Local Government Act 1903. (Note: Local Government Act 1903 (3 Edw. VII. No. 1893)) (Repealed by Local Government Act 1915 (6 Geo. V. No. 2686))
Surplus Revenue Act 1904	4 Edw. VII. No. 1904	6 September 1904
An Act relating to the Surplus Revenue of the Financial Year ended on the thirtieth day of June One thousand nine hundred and four.
Statistics Act 1904 (repealed)	4 Edw. VII. No. 1905	6 September 1905
An Act to provide for the Collection and Furnishing of Statistical Returns and Information. (Repealed by Statistics Act 1915 (6 Geo. V. No. 2730))
Wharfage and Harbors Rates Act 1904 (repealed)	4 Edw. VII. No. 1906	6 September 1905
An Act to amend Sections One hundred and ten and One hundred and eleven of the Melbourne Harbor Trust Act 1890 (Note: Melbourne Harbor Trust Act 1890 (54 Vict. No. 1119)) and Section Twenty of the Marine Act 1890. (Note: Marine Act 1890 (54 Vict. No. 1165)) (Repealed by Melbourne Harbor Trust Act 1915 (6 Geo. V. No. 2697)
Juries Act 1904 (repealed)	4 Edw. VII. No. 1907	27 September 1904
An Act to amend the Juries Acts. (Repealed by Juries Act 1915 (6 Geo. V. No. 2674))
Wild Dogs (Continuation) Act 1904 (repealed)	4 Edw. VII. No. 1908	27 September 1904
An Act to revive and continue the Wild Dogs Act 1901. (Note: Wild Dogs Act 1901 (1 Edw. VII. No. 1741)) (Repealed by Vermin Destruction Act 1915 (6 Geo. V. No. 2745))
	4 Edw. VII. No. 1909	27 September 1904
An Act to apply out of the Consolidated Revenue the sum of Three hundred and eighty-four thousand three hundred and three pounds to the service of the year One thousand nine hundred and four and One thousand nine hundred and five.
Declaring of Boroughs Act 1904	4 Edw. VII. No. 1910	27 September 1904
An Act to enable a Shire in certain circumstances to be declared a Borough and for other purposes.
Welshpool Jetty Rail or Tramway Construction Act 1904	4 Edw. VII. No. 1911	27 September 1904
An Act to authorize the construction of a Line of Rail or Tramway from Welshpool Railway Station to Welshpool.
Carrum Advances Act 1904 (repealed)	4 Edw. VII. No. 1912	11 October 1904
An Act to enable Seed and Manure to be advanced on certain terms to Cultivators of Land within the Carrum Irrigation and Water Supply Trust. (Repealed by Statute Law Revision Act 1995 (No. 11 of 1995))
Vermin Destruction Act 1904 (repealed)	4 Edw. VII. No. 1913	11 October 1904
An Act to amend the Law relating to the Destruction of Foxes. (Repealed by Vermin Destruction Act 1915 (6 Geo. V. No. 2745))
Mysia Land Exchange Act 1904	4 Edw. VII. No. 1914	11 October 1904
An Act to provide for the Exchange of certain Land in the Parish of Mysia for the purpose of a Public Park.
St. Arnaud Market Land Act 1904	4 Edw. VII. No. 1915	11 October 1904
An Act to revoke the Permanent Reservation of certain Land at St. Arnaud.
Lake Hindmarsh Land Act 1904	4 Edw. VII. No. 1916	11 October 1904
An Act to provide for the Resumption by the Crown of the Lake Hindmarsh Aboriginal Settlement Land.
Dairying Companies Act 1904	4 Edw. VII. No. 1917	11 October 1904
An Act to further amend the Dairying Companies Act 1900. (Note: Dairying Companies Act 1900 (63 Vict. No. 1649))
Tungamah Race-course Act 1904	4 Edw. VII. No. 1918	11 October 1904
An Act to authorize the Sale of certain Land reserved as a Site for a Race-course at Tungamah and for other purposes.
Numurkah Race-course Act 1904	4 Edw. VII. No. 1919	11 October 1904
An Act to authorize the Sale of certain Land reserved as a Site for a Race-course at Numurkah and for other purposes.
Municipal Endowment Reduction Act 1904	4 Edw. VII. No. 1920	11 October 1904
An Act to reduce for One Year the Municipal Endowment.
Dunolly Town Hall Land Act 1904	4 Edw. VII. No. 1921	11 October 1904
An Act to revoke the Permanent Reservation and Crown Grant of certain Land in the Borough of Dunolly.
Frankston Lands Act 1904	4 Edw. VII. No. 1922	11 October 1904
An Act to revoke the Permanent Reservation of certain pieces or parcels of Land in the Parishes of Frankston and Langwarrin.
Melbourne Benevolent Asylum Act 1904	4 Edw. VII. No. 1923	11 October 1904
An Act to enable the Melbourne Benevolent Asylum Corporation to sell the Site of the Asylum in the Town of North Melbourne and for other purposes.
	4 Edw. VII. No. 1924	24 October 1904
An Act to apply out of the Consolidated Revenue the sum of Six hundred and eighty-three thousand two hundred and ninety-three pounds to the service of the year One thousand nine hundred and four and One thousand nine hundred and five.
Instruments Act 1904 (repealed)	4 Edw. VII. No. 1925	24 October 1904
An Act to further amend the Instruments Act 1890. (Note: Instruments Act 1890 (54 Vict. No. 1103)) (Repealed by Instruments Act 1915 (6 Geo. V. No. 2672))
University Act 1904 (repealed)	4 Edw. VII. No. 1926	24 October 1904
An Act to farther amend the Law relating to the University of Melbourne. (Repealed by University Act 1915 (6 Geo. V. No. 2742))
Wharfage and Harbors Rate Alteration Act 1904 (repealed)	4 Edw. VII. No. 1927	24 October 1904
An Act to authorize the Alteration of the Wharfage and Harbors Rate leviable under the Marine Act 1890. (Repealed by Marine Act 1915 (6 Geo. V. No. 2688))
Gunbower Island Land Act 1904	4 Edw. VII. No. 1928	24 October 1904
An Act to provide for the Revocation of the Permanent Reservation of certain Land at Gunbower Island.
Licensing Act 1904 (repealed)	4 Edw. VII. No. 1929	8 November 1904
An Act to amend the Law relating to the Renewal of Licences and for other purposes. (Repealed by Licensing Act 1915 (6 Geo. V. No. 2683))
Artificial Manures Act 1904 (repealed)	4 Edw. VII. No. 1930	8 November 1904
An Act to amend the Law relating to the Sale of Artificial Manure. (Repealed by Fertilizers Act 1915 (6 Geo. V. No. 2652))
Transfer of Land Act 1904 (repealed)	4 Edw. VII. No. 1931	8 November 1904
An Act for the Removal of Doubts with regard to the Validity of the practice of the Office of Titles relating to the Registration of certain Instruments and for other purposes. (Repealed by Transfer of Land Act 1915 (6 Geo. V. No. 2740))
Coal and Firewood Act 1904 (repealed)	4 Edw. VII. No. 1932	8 November 1904
An Act for Regulating the Sale of Coal and Firewood. (Repealed by Weights and Measures Act 1915 (6 Geo. V. No. 2748))
Country Tramways Trust Fund Act 1904	4 Edw. VII. No. 1933	8 November 1904
An Act to amend Part IV. of the Tramways Act 1890. (Note: Tramways Act 1890 (54 Vict. No. 1148))
	4 Edw. VII. No. 1934	8 November 1904
An Act to apply out of the Consolidated Revenue the sum of One hundred pounds to the service of the year One thousand nine hundred and four and One thousand nine hundred and five.
Administration and Probate Duties Act 1904 (repealed)	4 Edw. VII. No. 1935	8 November 1904
An Act relating to Duties payable under the Administration and Probate Acts. (Repealed by Administration and Probate Act 1915 (6 Geo. V. No. 2611))
St. Kilda Abattoirs Land Act 1904	4 Edw. VII. No. 1936	22 November 1904
An Act to revoke the Crown Grant of certain Land granted as a Site for Abattoirs at St. Kilda and for other purposes.
Alexandra Park Act 1904	4 Edw. VII. No. 1937	22 November 1904
An Act to provide for vesting certain land on the south of the Yarra Yarra River in the Board of Land and Works and the City of Melbourne jointly for the purposes of a Public Park.
Income Tax Act 1904 (repealed)	4 Edw. VII. No. 1938	30 November 1904
An Act to declare the Rates of Income Tax for the Year ending on the thirty-first day of December One thousand nine hundred and five and to continue and amend the Income Tax Acts. (Repealed by Income Tax Act 1915 (6 Geo. V. No. 2668))
	4 Edw. VII. No. 1939	30 November 1904
An Act to continue the Voting by Post Acts or one year. (Repealed by Constitution Act Amendment Act 1915 (6 Geo. V. No. 2632))
Inebriates Act 1904 (repealed)	4 Edw. VII. No. 1940	30 November 1904
An Act to provide for the care, control, and treatment of Inebriates. (Repealed by Inebriates Act 1915 (6 Geo. V. No. 2669))
Shepparton Race-course Act 1904	4 Edw. VII. No. 1941	30 November 1904
An Act to authorize the Sale of certain Land reserved as a Site for a Race-course and other purposes of Public Recreation in the parish of Shepparton and for other purposes.
Ballarat Water Commission Mortgage Ratification Act 1904	4 Edw. VII. No. 1942	30 November 1904
An Act to ratify an Indenture made between the Ballarat Water Commissioners, the Governor of the State of Victoria, and the Board of Land and Works.
Water Supply Special Funds Application Act 1904	4 Edw. VII. No. 1943	30 November 1904
An Act to sanction the issue and application of certain Money available under the Country Tramways Trust Fund Act 1904 (Note: Country Tramways Trust Fund Act 1904 (4 Edw. VII. No. 1933)) for Water Supply in Country Districts.
Railway Loan Application Act 1904	4 Edw. VII. No. 1944	30 November 1904
An Act to sanction the issue and application of certain Money available under Loan Acts for Railways.
Surplus Revenue Act 1904 (No. 2)	4 Edw. VII. No. 1945	30 November 1904
An Act relating to certain Surplus Revenue.
Railways Act 1904 (repealed)	4 Edw. VII. No. 1946	30 November 1904
An Act to further amend the Laws relating to the Victorian Railways. (Repealed by Railway Lands Acquisition Act 1915 (6 Geo. V. No. 2715))
Church of England Act 1904	4 Edw. VII. No. 1947	30 November 1904
An Aqt to further amend the Law relating to the Church of England in Victoria.
Melbourne Lands Exchange Act 1904 (repealed)	4 Edw. VII. No. 1949	30 November 1904
An Act to authorize the Mayor Aldermen Councillors and Citizens of the City of Melbourne to exchange certain Lands with the Commonwealth. (Repealed by Queen Victoria Market Lands Act 1996 (No. 78 of 1996))
Public Service Act 1904 (repealed)	4 Edw. VII. No. 1950	30 November 1904
An Act to amend the Public Service Acts. (Repealed by Public Service Act 1915 (6 Geo. V. No. 2713))
Executors Company's Act 1904	4 Edw. VII. No. 1951	30 November 1904
An Act to further amend The Executors Company's Act. (Note: Executors Company's Act 1879 (43 Vict. No. 644))
Northern Suburbs Cemetery Act 1904 (repealed)	4 Edw. VII. No. 1952	30 November 1904
An Act to provide for the establishment of a Cemetery for the Northern Suburbs. (Repealed by Cemeteries Act 1915 (6 Geo. V. No. 2626))
Conveyancing Act 1904 (repealed)	4 Edw. VII. No. 1953	30 November 1904
An Act for simplifying and improving the practice of Conveyancing and the Law of Property and for other purposes. (Repealed by Conveyancing Act 1915 (6 Geo. V. No. 2633))
Melbourne Tramways Trust Act 1904	4 Edw. VII. No. 1954	30 November 1904
An Act to extend the Powers of The Melbourne Tramways Trust as regards Investments.
Factories and Shops Act 1904 (repealed)	4 Edw. VII. No. 1955	30 November 1904
An Act to amend section twenty-five of the Factories and Shops Act 1903. (Note: Factories and Shops Act 1903 (3 Edw. VII. No. 1857)) (Repealed by Factories and Shops Act 1905 (5 Edw. VII. No. 1975))
St. Kilda and Brighton Electric Street Railway Act 1904 (repealed)	4 Edw. VII. No. 1956	30 November 1904
An Act to authorize the construction of a Line of Electric Tramway from St. Kilda towards Brighton Beach and for other purposes. (Repealed by Transport Act 1983 (No. 9921))
Land Act 1904 (repealed)	4 Edw. VII. No. 1957	30 November 1904
An Act to amend the Land Acts. (Repealed by Land Act 1915 (6 Geo. V. No. 2676))
Strathmerton towards Tocumwal Railway Construction Act 1904	4 Edw. VII. No. 1958	30 November 1904
An Act to authorize the construction by the State of a Line of Railway from Strathmerton towards Tocumwal.
Justices Act 1904 (repealed)	4 Edw. VII. No. 1959	30 November 1904
An Act to further amend the Justices Act 1890 (Note: Justices Act 1890 (54 Vict. No. 1105)) and for other purposes. (Repealed by Justices Act 1915 (6 Geo. V. No. 2675))
	4 Edw. VII. No. 1960	30 November 1904
An Act to apply a sum out of the Consolidated Revenue to the service of the year ending on the thirtieth day of June One thousand nine hundred and five and to appropriate the Supplies granted in this Session of Parliament.
Mines Act 1904 (repealed)	4 Edw. VII. No. 1961	30 November 1904
An Act to further amend the Mines Acts. (Repealed by Mines Act 1915 (6 Geo. V. No. 2698))
Closer Settlement Act 1904 (repealed)	4 Edw. VII. No. 1962	30 November 1904
An Act providing for the Acquisition and Disposal of Land for Closer Settlement and for other purposes. (Repealed by Closer Settlement Act 1915 (6 Geo. V. No. 2629))
Railways Special Funds Application Act 1904	4 Edw. VII. No. 1948	30 November 1904
An Act to sanction the issue and application of certain Money available under the Country Tramways Trust Fund Act 1904 for Railways and other purposes.

== Sources ==
- "1904 Victorian Historical Acts". AustLII.
