= Yandoit =

- Town
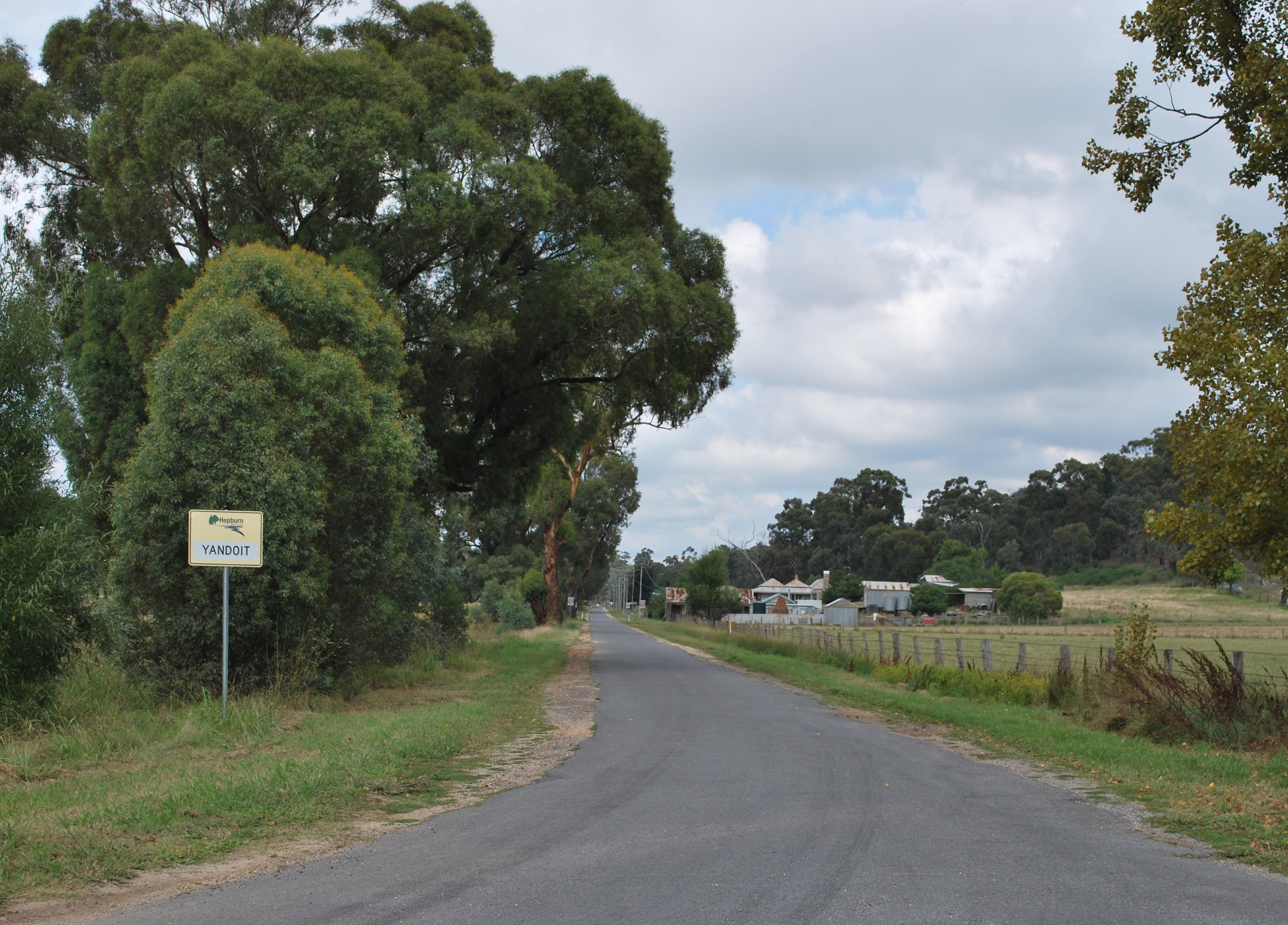
- Entering Yandoit

- Coordinates: 37°12′0″S 144°06′0″E
- Country: Australia
- State: Victoria
- LGA: Shire of Hepburn
- Location: 128 km (80 mi) NW of Melbourne; 63 km (39 mi) N of Ballarat; 21 km (13 mi) N of Daylesford, Victoria

Government
  - State electorate: Macedon
  - Federal division: Ballarat

Population
  - Total: 154 (2016 census)
- Postcode: 3461

Yandoit is a locality in Victoria, Australia. Yandoit is in the Hepburn Shire local government area, 128 kilometres (80 mi) north west of the state capital, Melbourne. At the 2016 census, Yandoit and the surrounding area had a population of 154.

The Yandoit area was first settled by Captain John Stuart Hepburn. Alluvial gold was discovered in 1854 and 5,000 miners came to the area creating a gold rush. The gold soon ran out and deep lead mining started in 1858. Yandoit was surveyed in 1861 when it had a population of 232. Despite its population declining to 77 in 1881, Yandoit was proclaimed a township in 1885.

Many Swiss Italians settled in Yandoit and Yandoit Hills, building many of the remaining stone buildings.

St John the Baptist Catholic Church was built in 1884 by Swiss-Italian Giacomo Sartori, and remained in use until 1993, when it closed. In 2016, refurbishments to the building commenced, with the church building now serving as private accommodation.

== Gallery ==
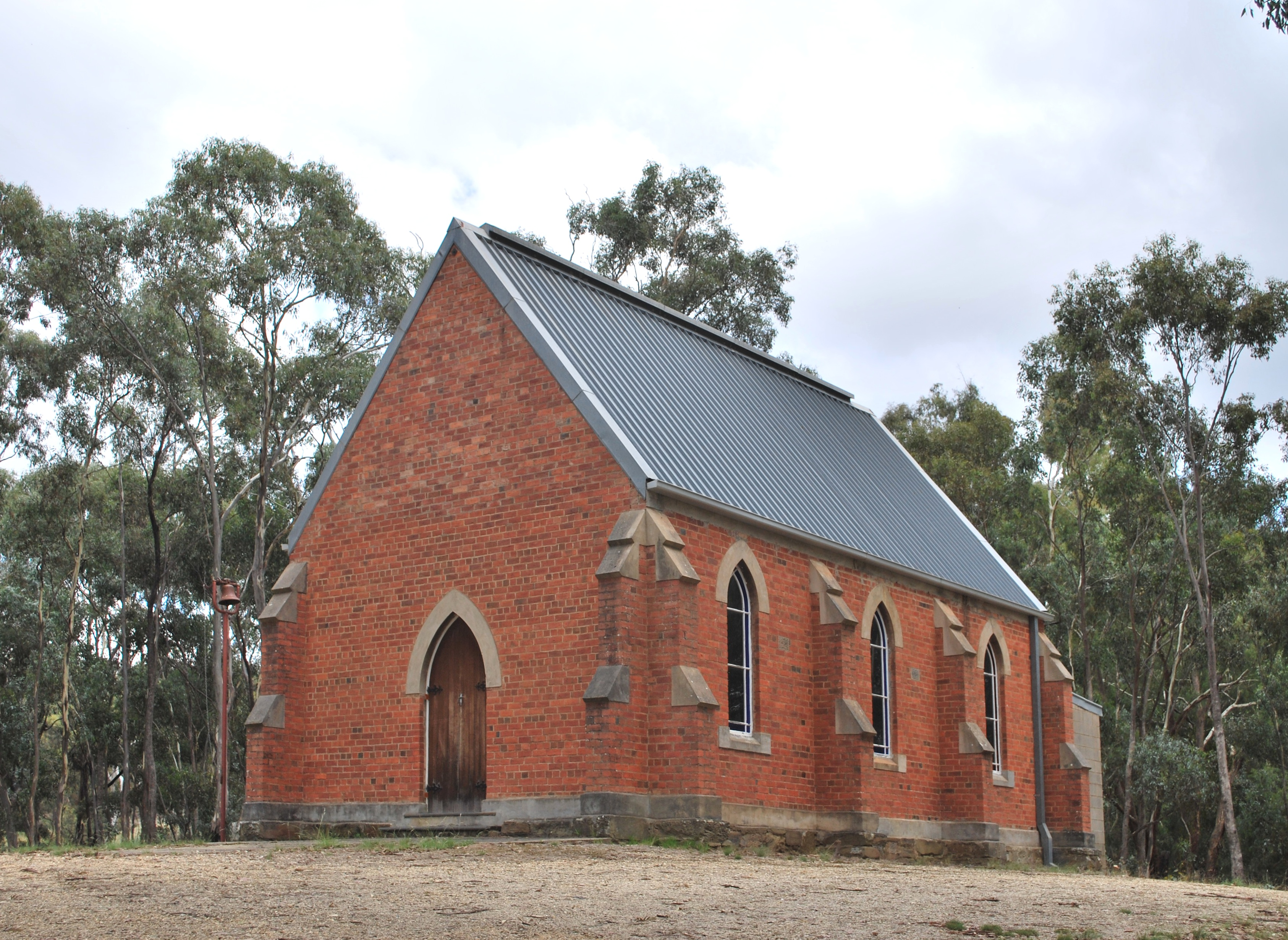
Anglican church

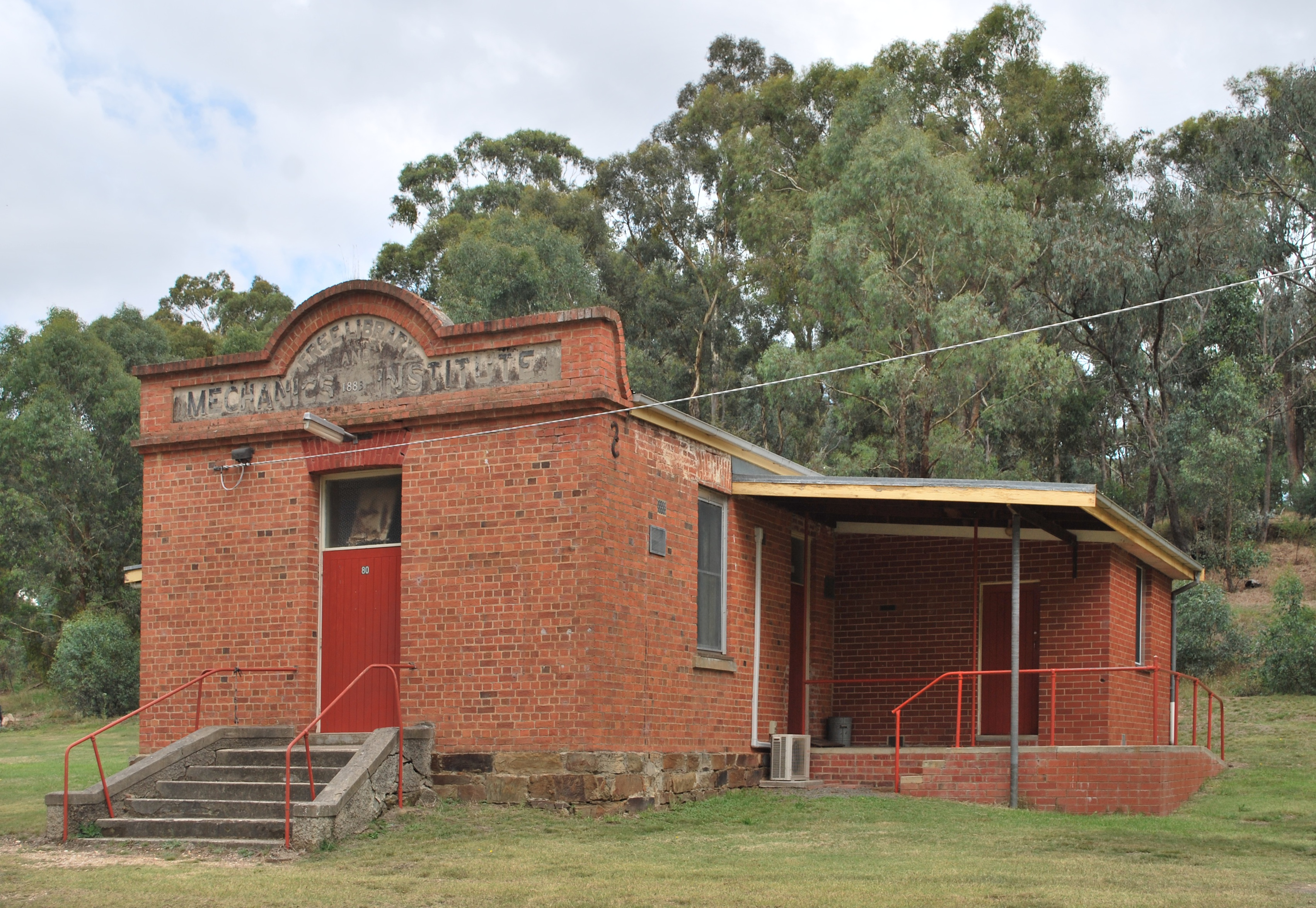
Mechanics Institute

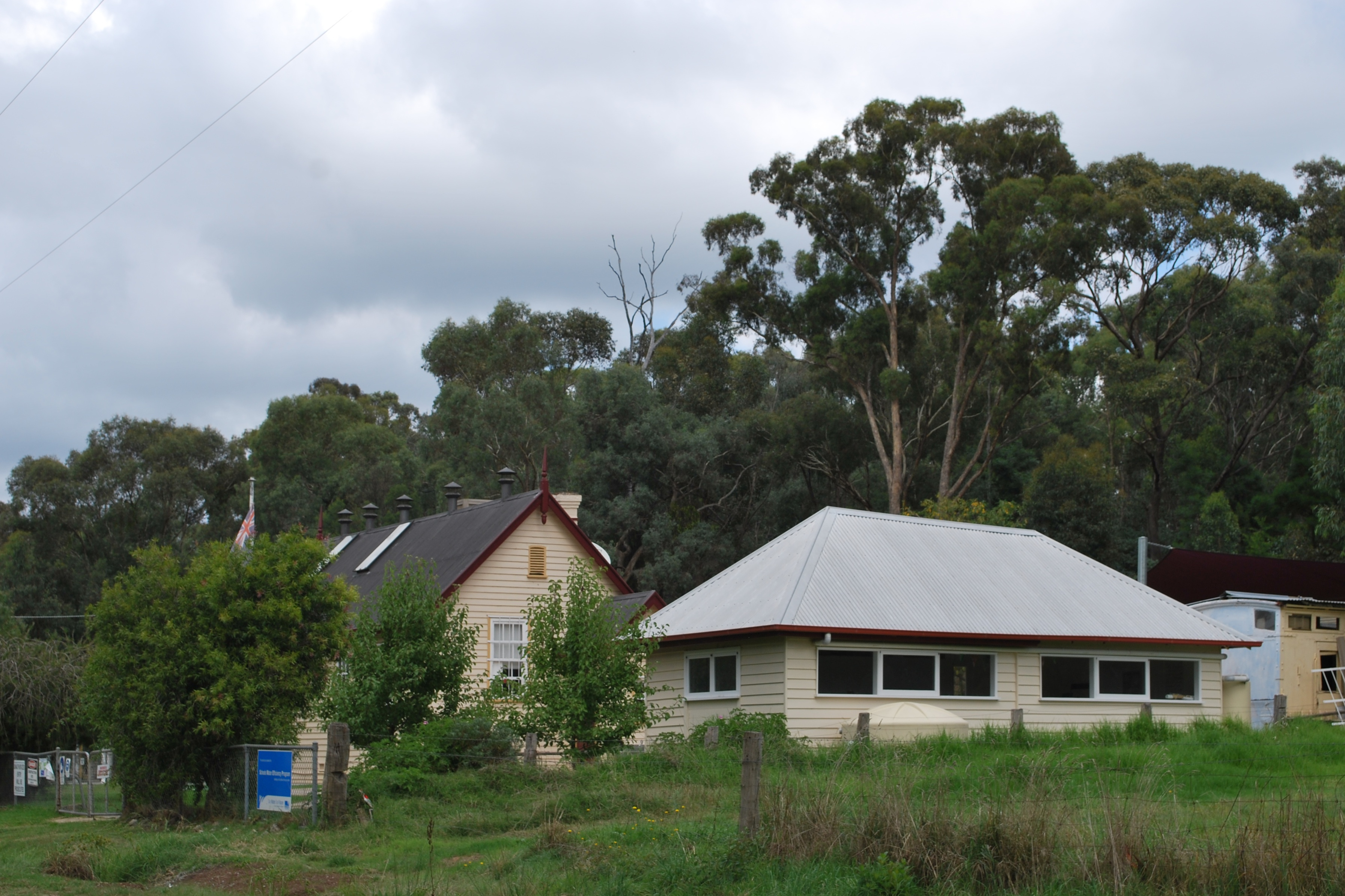
Primary School

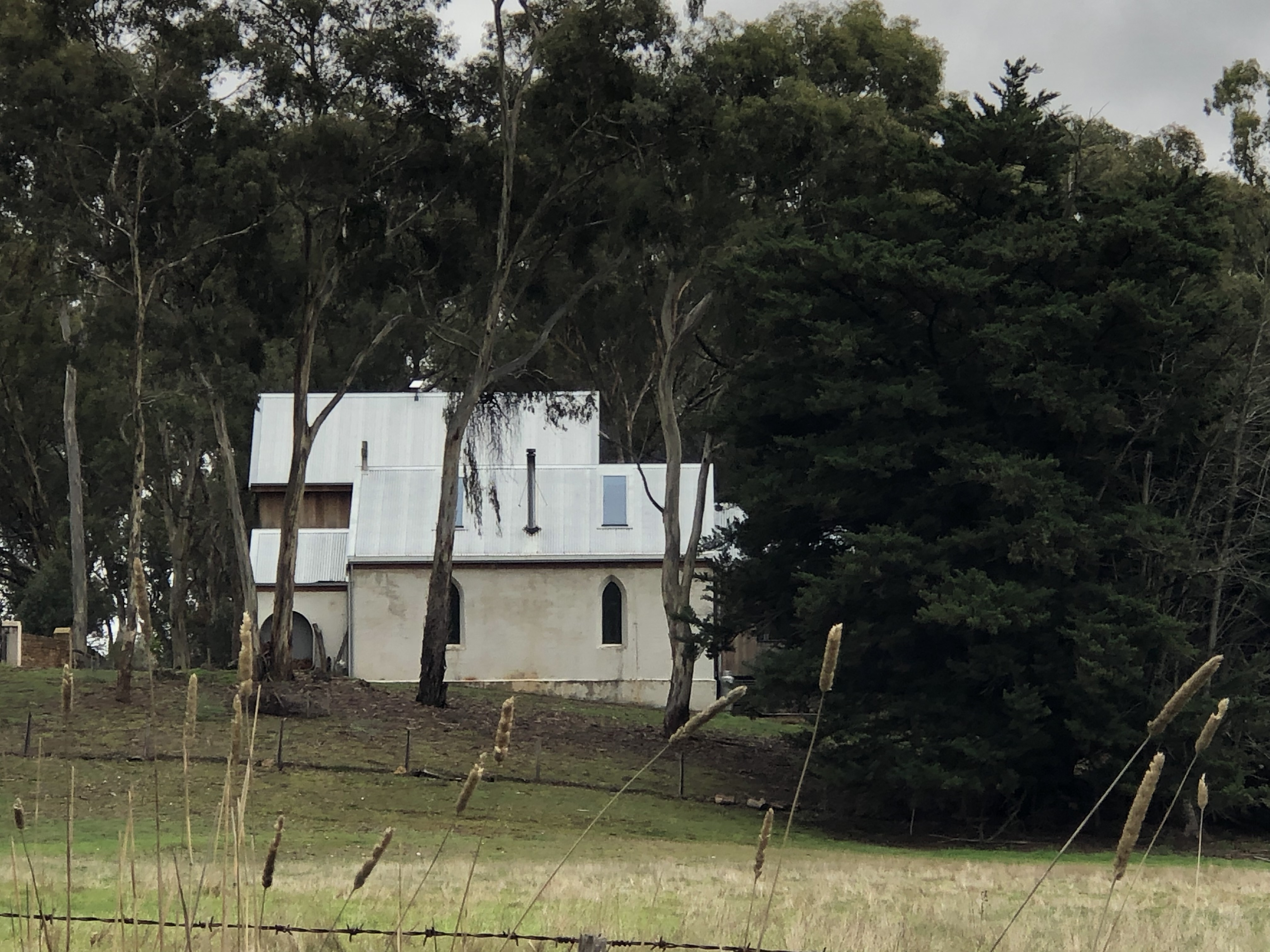
Catholic church
