= Yandoit Hills =

- Town
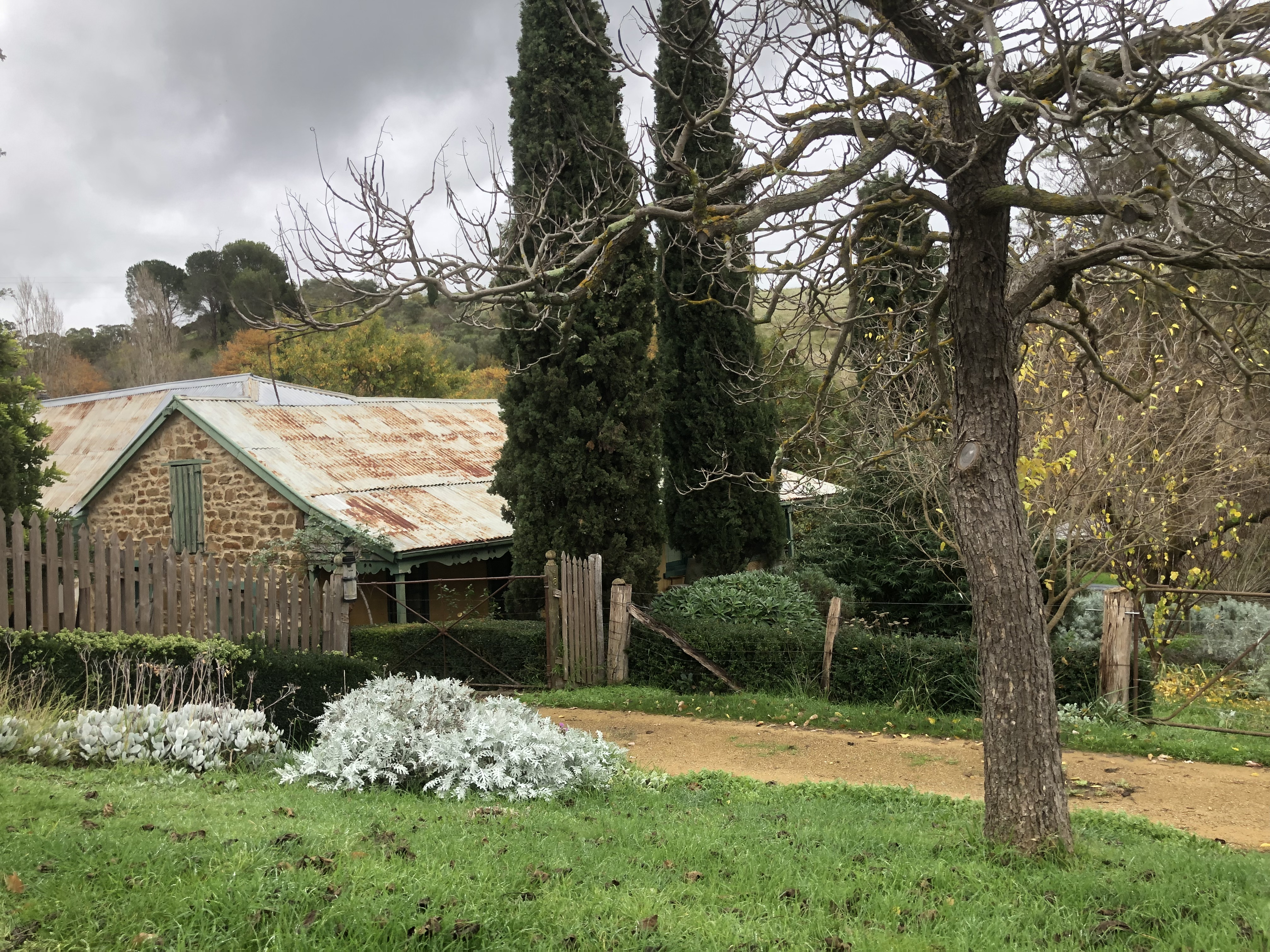
- "Bergamo House", originally part of the Gervasoni family's estate

- Coordinates: 37°12′54″S 144°03′08″E
- Country: Australia
- State: Victoria
- LGA: Shire of Mount Alexander

Government
  - State electorate: Bendigo West
  - Federal division: Bendigo

Population
  - Total: 44 (2021 census)
- Postcode: 3461

Yandoit Hills is a locality in Shire of Mount Alexander, Victoria, Australia. At the 2021 census, Yandoit Hills had a population of 44.

Like neighbouring Yandoit, the Yandoit Hills area saw an influx in its population during the gold rush from 1854. The area saw many Swiss Italians settle in the 1850s. One notable family includes the Gervasonis, who built a large house and winery, along with several other houses and outbuildings.
