= The Horn (Mount Buffalo) =

Mountain in Victoria, Australia

- Mount Buffalo

Highest point
- Elevation: 1,723 m (5,653 ft)AHD
- Coordinates: 36°46′35″S 146°45′57″E

Geography
- Location within Alpine Shire
- Location: Victoria, Australia
- Parent range: Victorian Alps, Great Dividing Range

The Horn is the most prominent peak on the Mount Buffalo plateau in Victoria, Australia. The Horn has an elevation of 1,723 metres (5,653 ft) AHD.

Found on the west side of the Victorian Alps (part of the Australian Alps and the Great Dividing Range), the top of the mountain has granite boulders and rock formations.

A walking track leads to the top of The Horn.

== History ==
Aboriginal people made summer ascents to Mount Buffalo to gather and feast on the protein-rich bogong moth that cluster in rock crevices, and also to meet and hold ceremonies. The Mount Buffalo plateau was named in 1824 by the explorers, Hume and Hovell, because of its supposed resemblance to a buffalo.

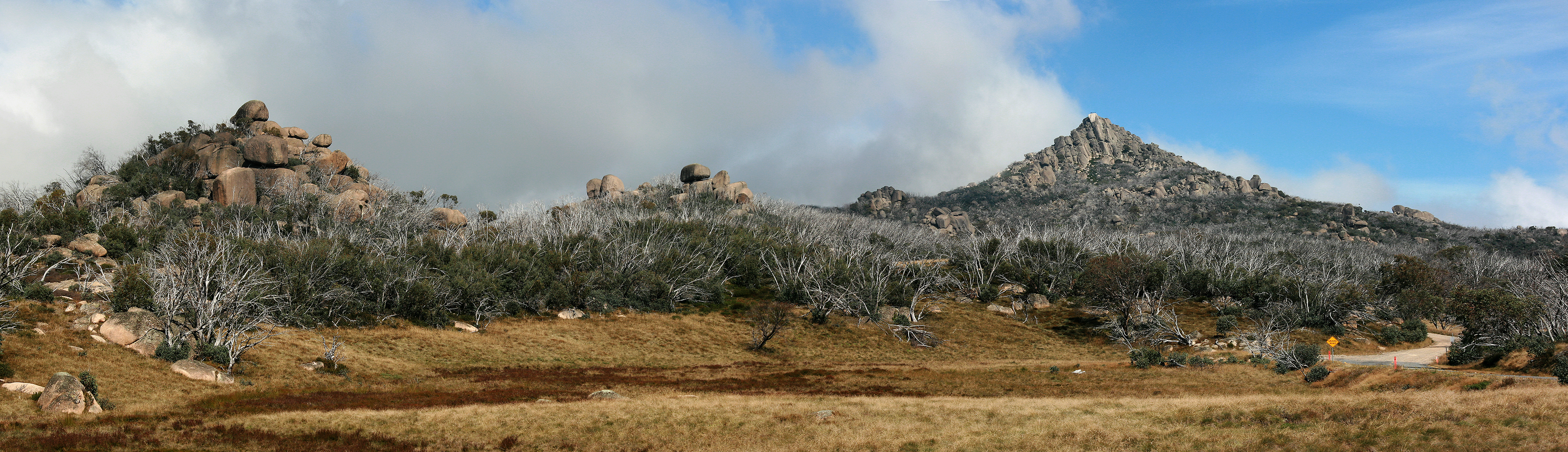
Panoramic view across the Mt Buffalo plateau, with The Horn towards image right; the safety railing for walkers can be seen at the top

== See also ==
- Alpine National Park
- List of mountains in Australia § Victoria
