= Lake Catani =

Reservoir in Victoria, Australia

Lake Catani Dam
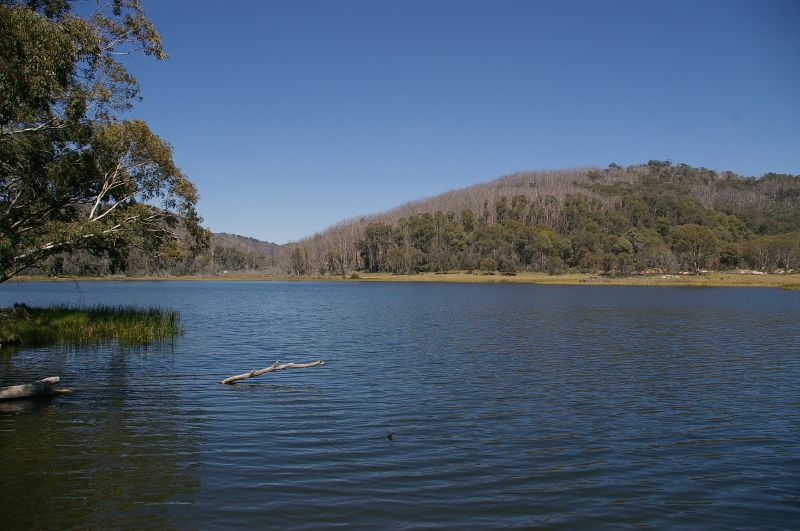
- The lake in 2006

- Location of the reservoir in Victoria
- Interactive map of Lake Catani Dam
- Country: Australia
- Location: Mount Buffalo National Park, Alps, Victoria
- Coordinates: 36°43′57″S 146°48′37″E
- Purpose: Water supply; Recreation
- Status: Operational
- Construction began: 1908
- Opening date: 1910
- Construction cost: A£2,355
- Built by: Public Works Department
- Designed by: Carlo Catani
- Operator: Parks Victoria / DNRE

Dam and spillways
- Type of dam: Arch dam
- Impounds: Eurobin Creek

Reservoir
- Creates: Lake Catani
- Surface area: 15 ha (37 acres)
- Maximum length: 800 m (2,600 ft)
- Maximum width: 400 m (1,300 ft)
- Maximum water depth: 10–20 m (33–66 ft)
- Normal elevation: 1,288 m (4,226 ft) AHD

Lake Catani is a reservoir formed by the Lake Catani Dam, an arch dam across the Eurobin Creek, in the Mount Buffalo National Park, in the Alps of Victoria, Australia. Completed in 1910 under the supervision and, most likely, design of Carlo Catani, an engineer of Public Works Department, the initial purpose was for the supply of potable and industrial water for the construction of the heritage-listed Mount Buffalo Chalet.

In more recent times, the reservoir was repurposed to provide recreational facilities in the area. The 15-hectare (37-acre) reservoir also serves as an emergency supply source for the Chalet and provides water for the campground.

== Reservoir overview ==
The Mount Buffalo National Park was established in 1898 with an 1,166-hectare (2,880-acre) temporary nature reserve centred on the Eurobin Falls. In 1908 the area was increased to 9,240 hectares (22,800 acres) and became permanent national park reserve.

=== Water supply ===
Lake Catani was completed in 1910 by construction of a mass concrete arched dam across Eurobin Creek, a tributary of the Ovens River, at Haunted Gorge. The contract was let in 1908 for A£2,355. The dam blocked what was then known as the "Underground River" and flooded Long Plain, in the process also flooding an Aboriginal camp site. It was initially intended to provide water for the Grossman sawmill, which was milling timber for the construction of the Mount Buffalo Chalet.

Carlo Catani was appointed Public Works Engineer in 1882 and spent much of his career developing hydrological schemes such as the drainage of the Koo-Wee-Rup and Elwood Swamps.

=== Recreational use ===
Lake Catani provided a popular venue for visitors, with boating and fishing in summer and ice-skating in winter. A golf course was also opened nearby at Tuckerbox Corner in 1911.

A campground, administered by Parks Victoria, is located near the shores of the lake, approximately 28 kilometres (17 mi) from Porepunkah. It is the only vehicle-accessible campground within the national park.

== Gallery ==
Streaming video of Mount Buffalo. Lake Catani can be viewed at 0:26.

Streaming video of Mount Buffalo. Lake Catani can be viewed at 0:26.
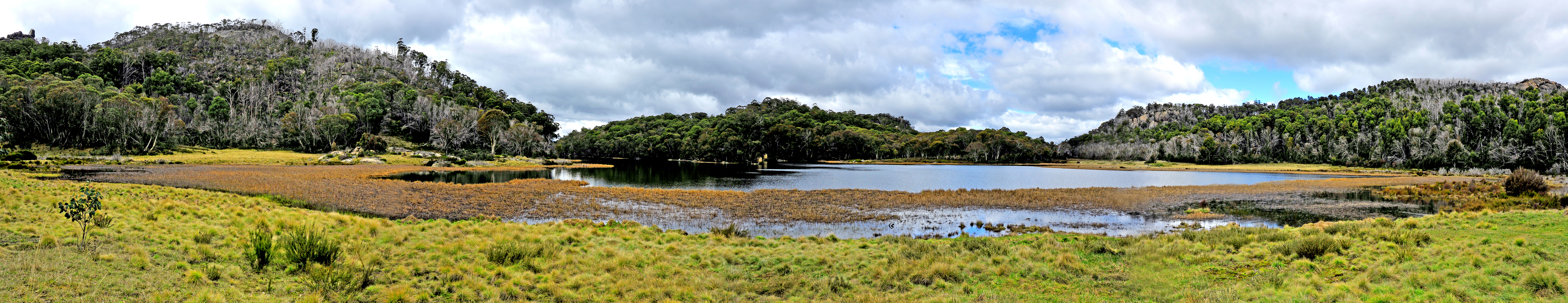
The lake with diminished supply, Spring 2009

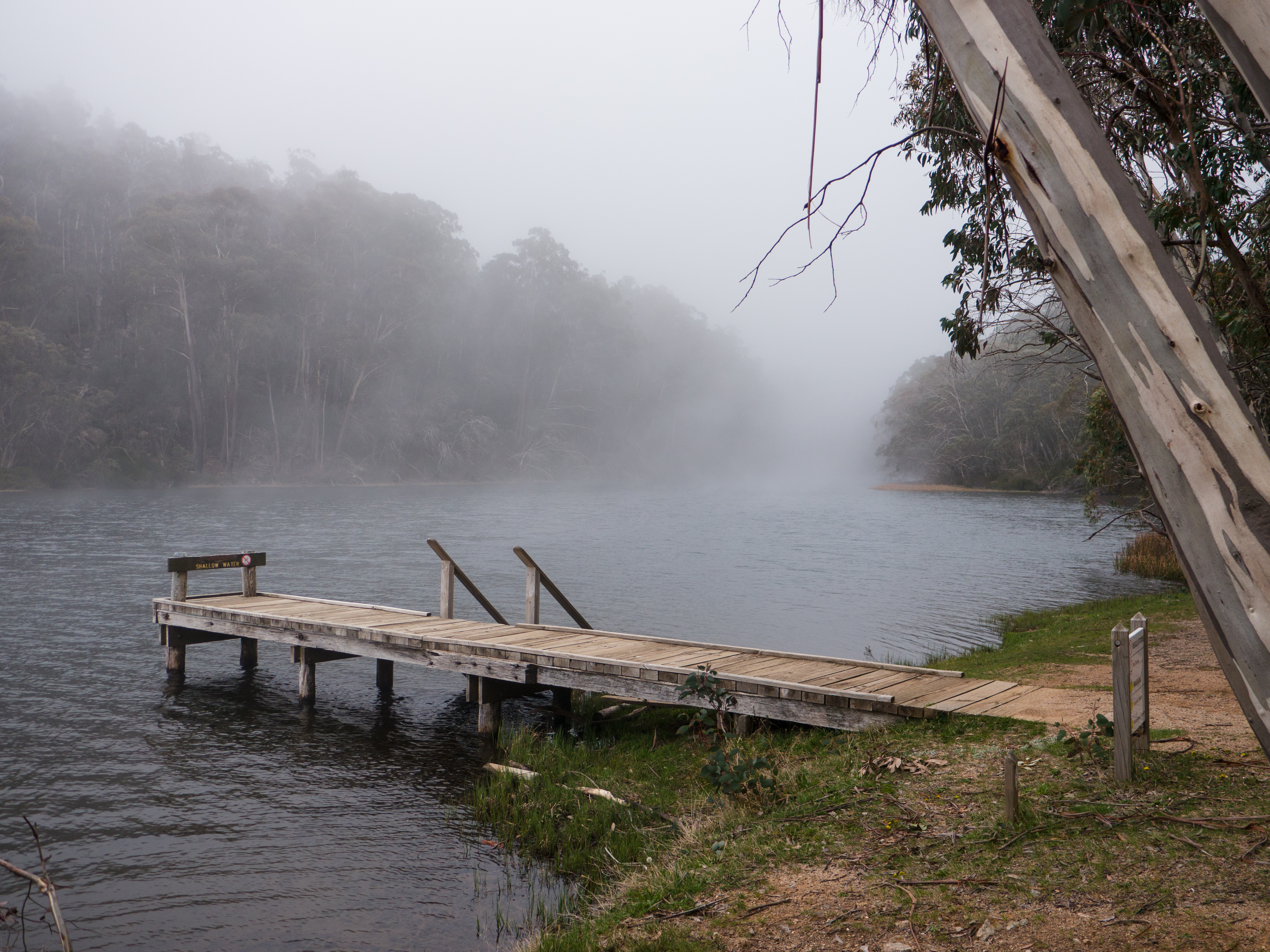
A wooden pier on the lake's shore, 2014

== See also ==
- List of reservoirs and dams in Victoria
