= Koo-Wee-Rup Swamp =

Reservoir in Victoria, Australia

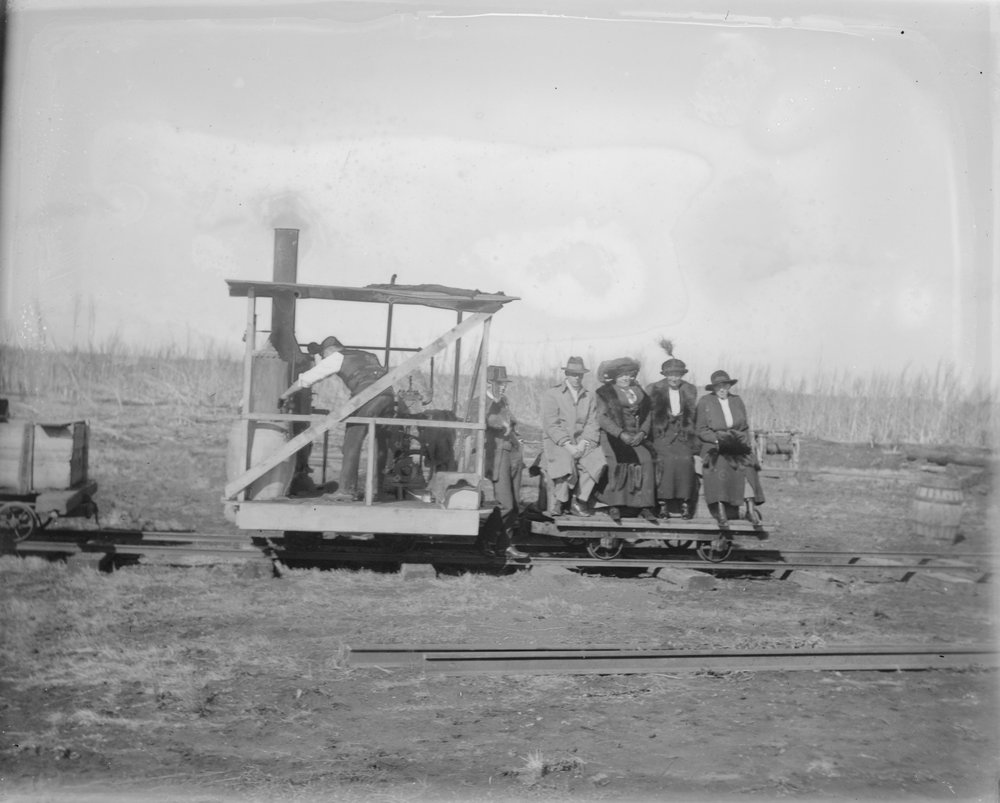
- First-class travel on the swamp, c. 1910

- Location of the reservoir in Victoria
- Interactive map of Koo-Wee-Rup Swamp
- Location: Greater Melbourne, Victoria
- Coordinates: 38°10′22″S 145°28′34″E
- Type: Freshwater lake / Swamp
- Primary inflows: Cardinia Creek; Bunyip River
- Surface area: 40,000 ha (99,000 acres)

The Koo-Wee-Rup Swamp (Note: The official name of the swamp is spelled using hyphens, viz., "Koo-Wee-Rup". However, the official name for the settlement (and associated structures) is spelled without hyphens, viz., "Koo Wee Rup" or sometimes incorrectly as "Kooweerup".) was a large freshwater ephemeral swamp or wetland, located in the Greater Metropolitan Melbourne area of Victoria, Australia. Situated in an area to the south east of the Melbourne central business district and to the north of Western Port Bay, the swamp was bounded by Tooradin to the west, Bunyip to the east, and, to the north, the Gippsland (Oakleigh to Bunyip) railway line. The swamp drained several waterways including the Cardinia Creek and the Bunyip River and only a small amount of wetland remains today, predominately used for market gardening.

Koo-Wee-Rup, also spelled as ku-wirup, is a Boonwurrung Aboriginal word meaning “blackfish swimming”, or “plenty of blackfish“.

== Overview ==
Estimates of the area of the swamp vary, yet it was typically considered as covering approximately 40,000 hectares (99,000 acres) at its peak. The area comprises dense swamp paperbark (Melaleuca ericifolia), with some open grasslands, reed beds (Phragmites australis) and bullrushes (Typha spp).

The settlement surrounding the swamp was known as Yallock Settlement until the South Gippsland railway line arrived and the station was named Koo Wee Rup railway station. The town developed into a service and railway centre to the surrounding agricultural and dairy farms. Eventually, the area around Koo-Wee-Rup became known as the "potato capital" of Victoria. Many other vegetable crops were also grown, including asparagus, and by the early 2000s the former swamp produced 95% of Australia's asparagus. The swamp suffers from some risk of mineralisation and salinity, due to excessive water supply for market gardens.

The swamp's drain and associated bridges were added to the Cardinia Shire local government heritage register.

== History ==
=== 19th century ===
Known as The Great Swamp, it was an impassable barrier for travellers between Melbourne and Gippsland. Although the fringes of the swamp were settled by the mid-19th century, farming was not possible on much of the land because of frequent flooding, and the rapid re-growth of paperbark and other swamp vegetation. An 1863 letter, from George McDonald, an assistant surveyor, to the Surveyor-General of Victoria, as published in The Argus, indicated that there was good soil where the swamp was supposed to exist.

In the 1870s, efforts were made by the Victorian Department of Lands to drain the swamp and open up the area for agriculture. A Koo-Wee-Rup Swamp Drainage Committee was formed by local landowners and, in February 1876, excavation of the main channel was commenced, to take water from the Cardinia Creek. That channel, leading into Western Port at Moody's Inlet, was 8 kilometres (26,000 ft) long and 1.2 metres (3 ft 11 in) deep. Other drains were also dug, including those for Toomuc Creek and the Bunyip River. Those early efforts tended to lack coordination and landowners carried out their own drainage works, sometimes to the detriment of adjoining properties.

The construction of the South Gippsland railway line required the swamp to be crossed via a series of pile bridges, completed in 1889. By 1890, the Victorian Public Works Department, under the direction of engineer Carlo Catani, began executing a large-scale drainage plan. A 15-kilometre (9.3 mi) main canal was dug to Reeces Inlet on Westernport Bay, fed by four subsidiary drains. However, massive floods in 1891, exacerbated by the clearing of forested country further inland, meant that canals had to be widened and deepened more than once. Contract labour was suspended in 1893, as part of the economic depression, and the work handed over to unemployed married men who were contractually bound to accept and improve a 8.1-hectare (20-acre) plot of land while also working on the general drainage scheme. Their families soon followed and primitive housing was gradually replaced by weatherboard structures. More floods in 1893 proved the main drain inadequate and the nascent efforts at cultivation were despoiled.

=== 20th century ===
The settlers found the plots unprofitable and successfully agitated for larger allotments. They also managed to overturn legislation forbidding them to transfer their land to existing landowners. This allowed new, more experienced farmers from other districts into the area. However, changes were slow and disastrous floods in 1900 and 1934 led to further drainage works. Remaining areas of reclaimed swamp were divided up for soldier settlement schemes after World War I.

== See also ==
- List of lakes of Victoria
- List of reservoirs and dams in Victoria
- Strzelecki railway line
