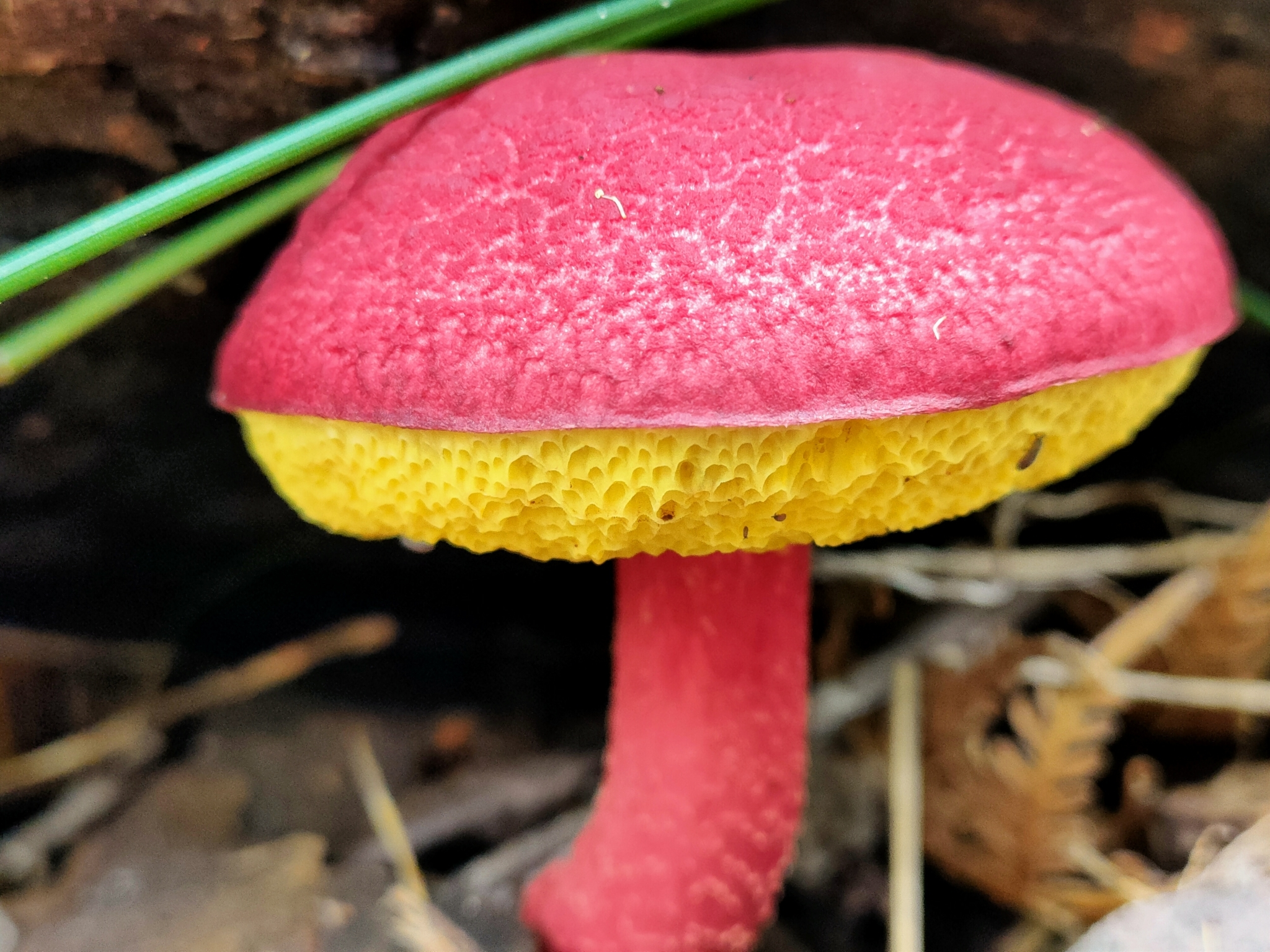

Scientific classification
- Kingdom: Fungi
- Division: Basidiomycota
- Class: Agaricomycetes
- Order: Boletales
- Family: Boletaceae
- Genus: Boletellus
- Species: B. obscurecoccineus

Binomial name
- Boletellus obscurecoccineus (Höhn.) Singer (1945)

Synonyms
- Boletus obscurecoccineus Höhn. (1914); Boletus puniceus W.F.Chiu (1948); Xerocomus puniceus (W.F.Chiu) F.L.Tai (1979); Boletus megasporus W.Zang (1980); Boletellus puniceus (W.F.Chiu) X.H.Wang & P.G.Liu (2002)

= Boletellus obscurecoccineus =

Species of fungus

Boletellus obscurecoccineus, (Note: Orthographic variant spellings include Boletellus obscure-coccineus and Boletellus obscurecoccineus.) known as the rhubarb bolete, is a species of fungus in the family Boletaceae, found in Australia, New Guinea, Java, Borneo, Japan, Korea, and Taiwan. It is a distinctive and colourful bolete of the forest floor.

== Taxonomy ==
Boletellus obscurecoccineus was originally collected in Java and described by Franz Xaver Rudolf von Höhnel in 1914, and placed in the genus Boletellus by Rolf Singer in 1945. In 2011, Nian-Kai Zeng and Zhu L. Yang synonymised the Asian species Boletus puniceus and Boletus megasporus with Boletellus obscurecoccineus. Boletus puniceus, originally described from Kunming (Yunnan, China) in 1948, and later transferred to Xerocomus in 1979 and Boletellus in 2002, was already suspected by E.J.H. Corner in 1972 as being conspecific with B. obscurecoccineus in his monograph on Malaysian boletes. Boletus megasporus was described from the Xizang Autonomous Region of China in 1980. Comparison of the type specimens revealed no significant morphological differences between B. obscurecoccineus and B. megasporus.

== Description ==
A brightly coloured and distinctive bolete, Boletellus obscurecoccineus has a rose-red or rhubarb-coloured, hemispherical to convex cap to a diameter of 7 cm (3 in), with an overhanging margin when young. The cap may crack in older specimens, and reveal the yellow flesh beneath. The adnexed pores are five- or six-sided and yellow. They bruise blue in some specimens (although not generally in Western Australia). The narrow stipe lacks a ring, and may reach 9.5 cm (3.7 in) tall with a diameter of 2 cm (0.8 in). It is reddish and scaled overall, fading to yellow under the cap. The spore print is a dark brown. The mycelium is white. There is no significant odour and the taste is mild. Under the microscope, the elongated pale yellow spores measure 14.5–19.5 by 6–7.5 μm.

=== Similar species ===
Similar-looking African collections initially reported as Boletellus obscurecoccineus have been redescribed as Boletellus rubrolutescens. The North American and European species Boletus rubellus has colouration that is somewhat similar to B. obscurecoccineus, but it lacks the scaly stem of the latter.

== Habitat and distribution ==
The distribution includes Korea, New Guinea, Java, Borneo, Japan, and Taiwan. Within Australia, the rhubarb bolete has been recorded from southwestern Western Australia, and the southeast of New South Wales, and into Victoria and Tasmania.

The rhubarb bolete is an ectomycorrhizal species, found in the leaf litter of eucalyptus forests in Australia, and with oak and other deciduous trees in Asia. Fruit bodies appear over the summer and autumn, from July to November.

Despite its English name, whether this mushroom is safe to eat is unknown. While there are no known species of inedible boletes that are deadly poisonous, there are many species of red-pigmented boletes that will cause gastrointestinal distress if eaten.
