= Mount Buffalo =

Mountain in Victoria, Australia

- Tubbalunganer
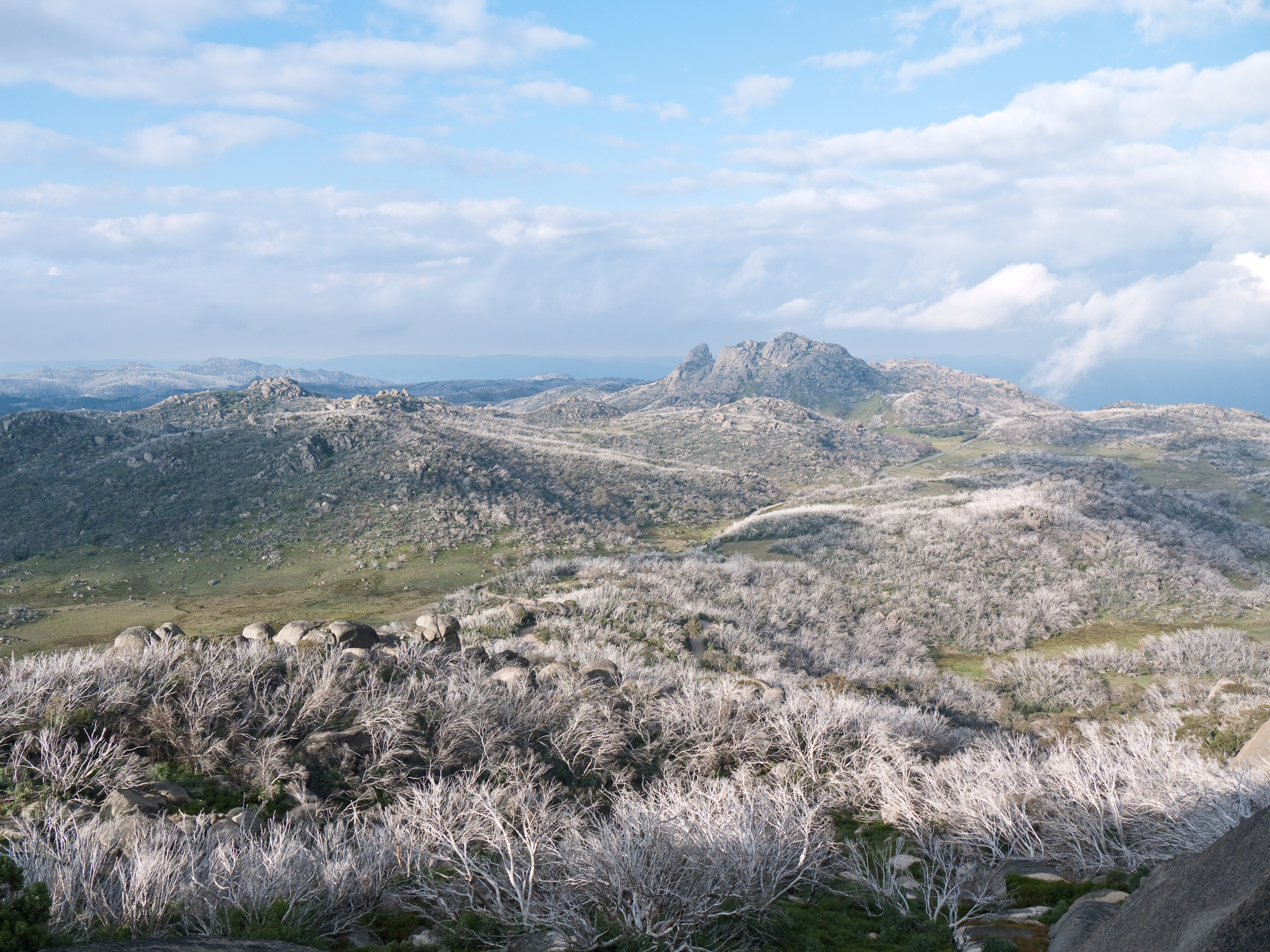
- Mount Buffalo plateau as seen from below The Horn

Highest point
- Elevation: 1,723 m (5,653 ft)
- Prominence: 743 m (2,438 ft)
- Isolation: 34.79 km (21.62 mi)
- Listing: Mountains of Victoria
- Coordinates: 36°44′18″S 146°46′30″E

Geography
- Location within Alpine Shire
- Country: Australia
- State: Victoria
- Protected area: Mount Buffalo National Park
- Parent range: Victorian Alps, Great Dividing Range

Climbing
- First ascent: Unknown
- Easiest route: Road access up Mount Buffalo Road

Aerial views of Mount Buffalo

Mount Buffalo is a mountain plateau of the Australian Alps and is within the Mount Buffalo National Park in Victoria, Australia. It is located approximately 350 kilometres (220 mi) northeast of Melbourne. It is noted for its dramatic scenery.

The summit of the highest peak of the plateau, known as The Horn, has an elevation of 1,723 metres (5,653 ft) AHD.

Mount Buffalo is managed by Parks Victoria.

== History ==
Before British colonisation, Mount Buffalo was occupied by the Mogullumbidj. The Mogullumbidj were a Dhuduroa-speaking people known as "Druids" to early colonists and recorders. The term Minjambuta is likely a synonym for the Mogullumbidj that was popularised by its use by Norman Tindale in his mapping of Australian tribes, and the term is still found in signage throughout the park. The Mogullumbidj were closely associated with the Mt Buffalo plateau, and hosted other groups who visited to feast on bogong moths (Agrotis infusa). The Aboriginal name for the mountain was Tubbalunganer.

Despite having no relationship to the Kulin groups of central and southern Victoria, Mt Buffalo and the surrounding terrain was included in a Traditional Owner Settlement Act agreement with the Taungurung traditional owner group by the Victorian government in October 2018. This decision was subsequently challenged and found wanting by the Federal Court of Australia.

Hamilton Hume and William Hovell were the first Europeans to visit the area and they named the mountain during their 1824 expedition, noting the mountain's resemblance to a giant, sleeping buffalo.

In 1836, the explorer and Surveyor General of New South Wales, Thomas Mitchell visited the area and named the mountain Mount Aberdeen, unaware it had already been named Mount Buffalo.

== Recreation ==
There are extensive walking tracks across the Plateau that is studded with large granite tors. Two walk-in camping areas are available. The Mount Buffalo Gorge has sheer granite cliffs that provide good views down to the Ovens Valley. The cliffs are popular for rock climbing. There is a launch ramp for hang gliders at the cliffs.

There are waterfalls on the edge of escarpment.

The Mount Buffalo Chalet provided accommodation on the mountain but is not currently operating.

During winter Mount Buffalo offers snow play and cross-country skiing. The Cresta Valley and Dingo Dell areas have tobogganing and snow play areas as well as cross-country ski trails and marked snowshoe walks.

Lake Catani on the plateau is used for canoeing, fishing and swimming and has a bookable camping area.

== Climate ==
Climate data are sourced from Mount Buffalo Chalet, situated at an altitude of 1,350 metres (4,430 ft). An extreme winter rainfall peak is noted, with a large quantity falling as heavy snow.

Climate data for Mount Buffalo Chalet (1910–1980, rainfall to 2021); 1,350 m AMSL; 36.72° S, 146.82° E
Month	Jan	Feb	Mar	Apr	May	Jun	Jul	Aug	Sep	Oct	Nov	Dec	Year
Record high °C (°F)	31.7 (89.1)	31.9 (89.4)	28.3 (82.9)	24.4 (75.9)	18.9 (66.0)	15.0 (59.0)	14.0 (57.2)	16.0 (60.8)	19.6 (67.3)	21.5 (70.7)	26.1 (79.0)	29.5 (85.1)	31.9 (89.4)
Mean daily maximum °C (°F)	19.7 (67.5)	19.5 (67.1)	16.7 (62.1)	11.8 (53.2)	8.0 (46.4)	5.2 (41.4)	3.9 (39.0)	4.8 (40.6)	7.9 (46.2)	11.1 (52.0)	14.3 (57.7)	17.5 (63.5)	11.7 (53.1)
Mean daily minimum °C (°F)	10.9 (51.6)	11.3 (52.3)	9.1 (48.4)	5.5 (41.9)	2.7 (36.9)	0.4 (32.7)	−0.6 (30.9)	−0.2 (31.6)	1.7 (35.1)	3.8 (38.8)	6.3 (43.3)	9.1 (48.4)	5.0 (41.0)
Record low °C (°F)	0.8 (33.4)	1.5 (34.7)	−0.8 (30.6)	−3.5 (25.7)	−7.2 (19.0)	−5.0 (23.0)	−5.6 (21.9)	−6.0 (21.2)	−6.6 (20.1)	−8.1 (17.4)	−2.5 (27.5)	−1.1 (30.0)	−8.1 (17.4)
Average precipitation mm (inches)	89.3 (3.52)	87.0 (3.43)	99.5 (3.92)	126.3 (4.97)	186.9 (7.36)	207.5 (8.17)	225.1 (8.86)	217.7 (8.57)	192.1 (7.56)	183.5 (7.22)	129.7 (5.11)	111.7 (4.40)	1,856.3 (73.09)
Average precipitation days (≥ 0.2 mm)	6.6	6.7	7.4	9.0	12.2	13.5	14.5	15.0	13.6	12.5	10.2	8.9	130.1
Source: Australian Bureau of Meteorology; Mount Buffalo Chalet

== See also ==
- List of mountains in Australia § Victoria
- Buffalo River (Victoria)
- Mount Buffalo National Park
