= Mount Buffalo Chalet =

Ski resort in Australia

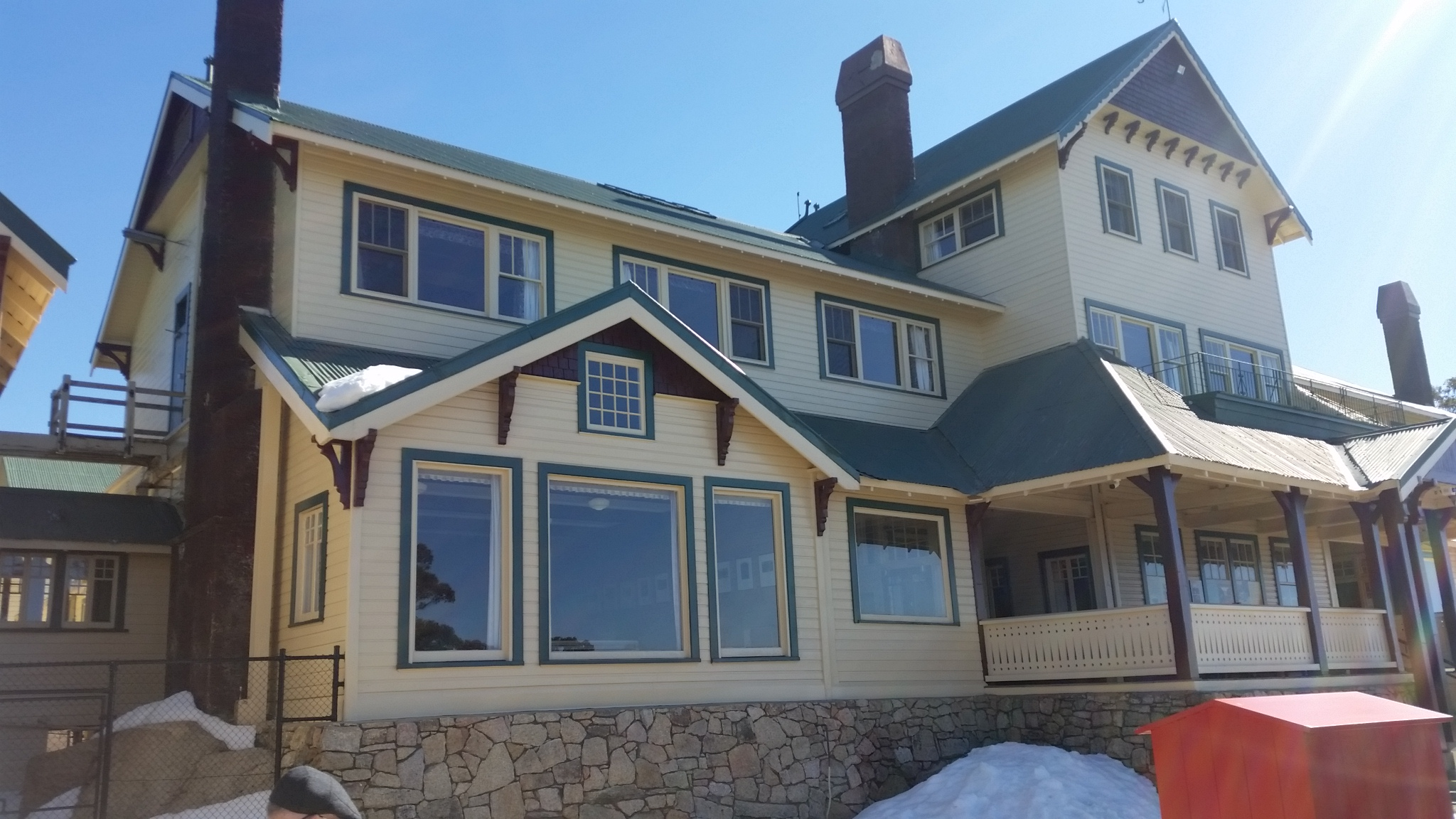
- Mount Buffalo Chalet in August 2018
- Interactive map of the Mount Buffalo Chalet area

General information
- Location: Mount Buffalo Road, Mount Buffalo National Park, Australia
- Coordinates: 36.7221°S 146.8199°E
- Opened: 1910
- Owner: Parks Victoria

Technical details
- Material: Timber

Design and construction
- Architect: Samuel Charles Brittingham
- Developer: Public Works Department

The Mount Buffalo Chalet is an accommodation resort in the Mount Buffalo National Park administered by Parks Victoria. It is the largest timber building in Australia.

== History ==
The Mount Buffalo Chalet was built in 1910 by the Public Works Department as the first ski resort in the Victorian Alps. It was leased to private enterprise as a guest house. In October 1924 it was taken over by the Victorian Railways who offered holiday packages, with train services from Melbourne connecting with Hoys Roadlines services at Porepunkah railway station.

In December 1985 it passed to the Victorian Tourism Commission. After being leased privately in 1993, it closed in January 2007. It is the largest timber building in Australia.

In December 2024 it was announced that Belgravia Group had signed a 40-year lease to open the Chalet for experiential learning programs, such as school camps. The re-opening is expected to occur in stages, starting with the cafe in September 2026; ten apartments in October; and the regional workers' accommodation and school camp facilities in 2027.
