= Carlo Catani =

Carlo Giorgio Domenico Enrico Catani
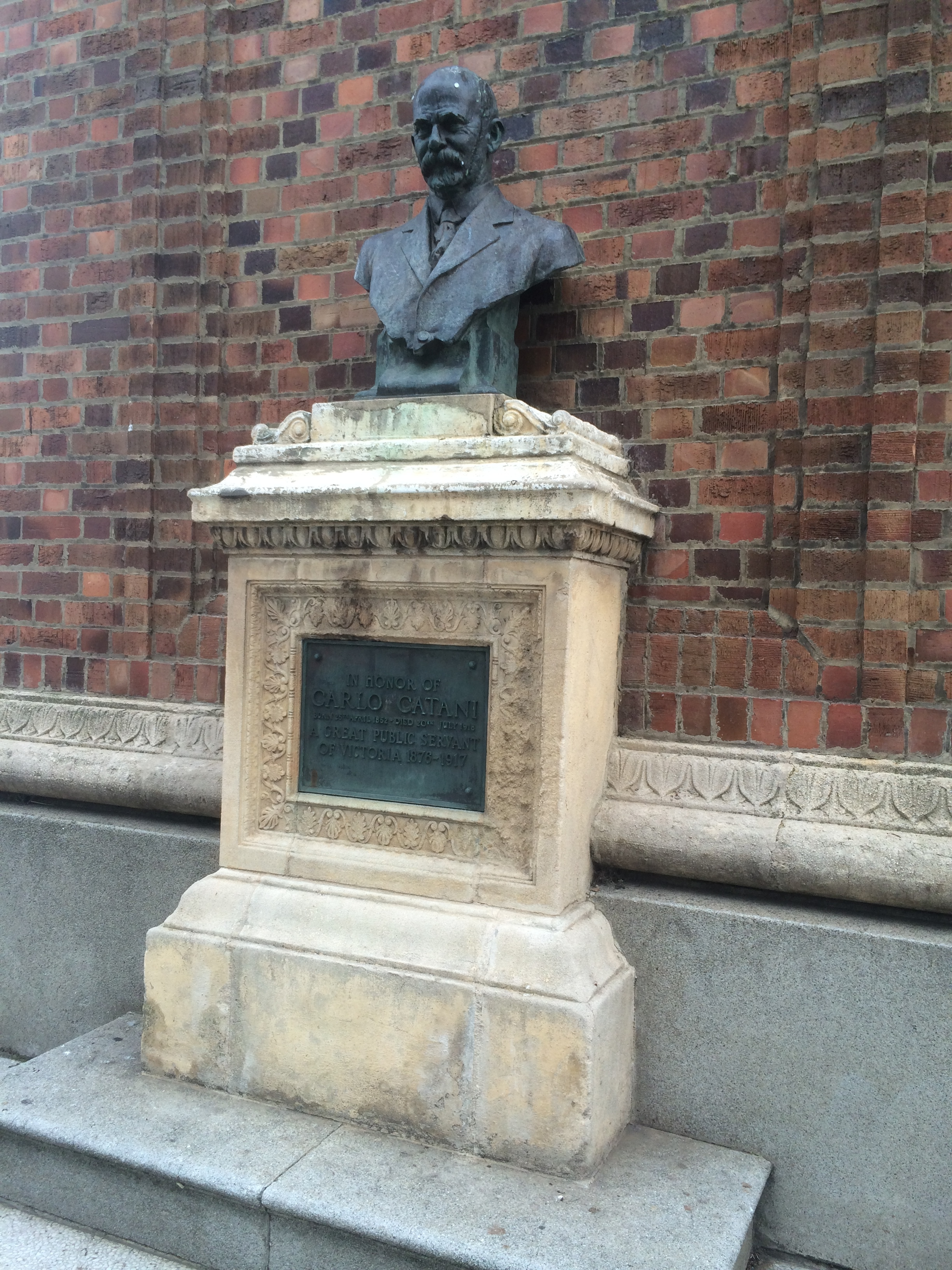
- Memorial statue and plaque honouring Carlo Catani, St. Kilda, Victoria
- Born: 22 April 1852; Florence, Grand Duchy of Tuscany
- Died: 20 July 1918 (aged 66); St Kilda, Melbourne, Victoria, Australia
- Occupation: Civil engineer
- Years active: 1876–1917
- Spouse: Cathrine Hanley
- Children: 6

Carlo Giorgio Domenico Enrico Catani (22 April 1852 – 20 July 1918) was a civil engineer who, for the majority of his career, worked in Australia for the Victorian State Government.

He was born in Florence, Italy, and gained a civil engineering diploma at the Technical Institute there. After working in railway construction, he migrated to New Zealand in 1876, but left for Melbourne almost immediately. Within a few weeks, he joined the Victorian Department of Crown Lands and Survey as a draughtsman. In 1882, he transferred to the Public Works Department, and became head of his section in 1892.

Catani oversaw many civil engineering projects, including:

- the draining of the Koo-Wee-Rup swamp
- the widening and improvement of the Yarra River upstream from Princes Bridge, Alexandra Avenue and the laying out and planting of the Alexandra Gardens
- the making of roads to Arthurs Seat and to Mount Donna Buang
- the construction of the Elwood Canal
- the construction of Murray River levees in the Strathmerton district
- the construction of Lake Catani on Mount Buffalo
- the reclamation and the layout of the St Kilda foreshore.

== Personal life ==
In May 1886, Catani married 26-year-old Cathrine Hanley, the daughter of a Belfast (Port Fairy) farmer. The couple had three daughters and three sons, one of whom was killed in action in World War I. He was naturalised on 15 March 1892.

== Legacy ==
The township of Catani, Victoria, Lake Catani at Mount Buffalo, and Catani Gardens in the suburb of St. Kilda, are named after him.
