= Alexandra Gardens, Melbourne =

Public gardens in Melbourne, Australia

Alexandra Gardens
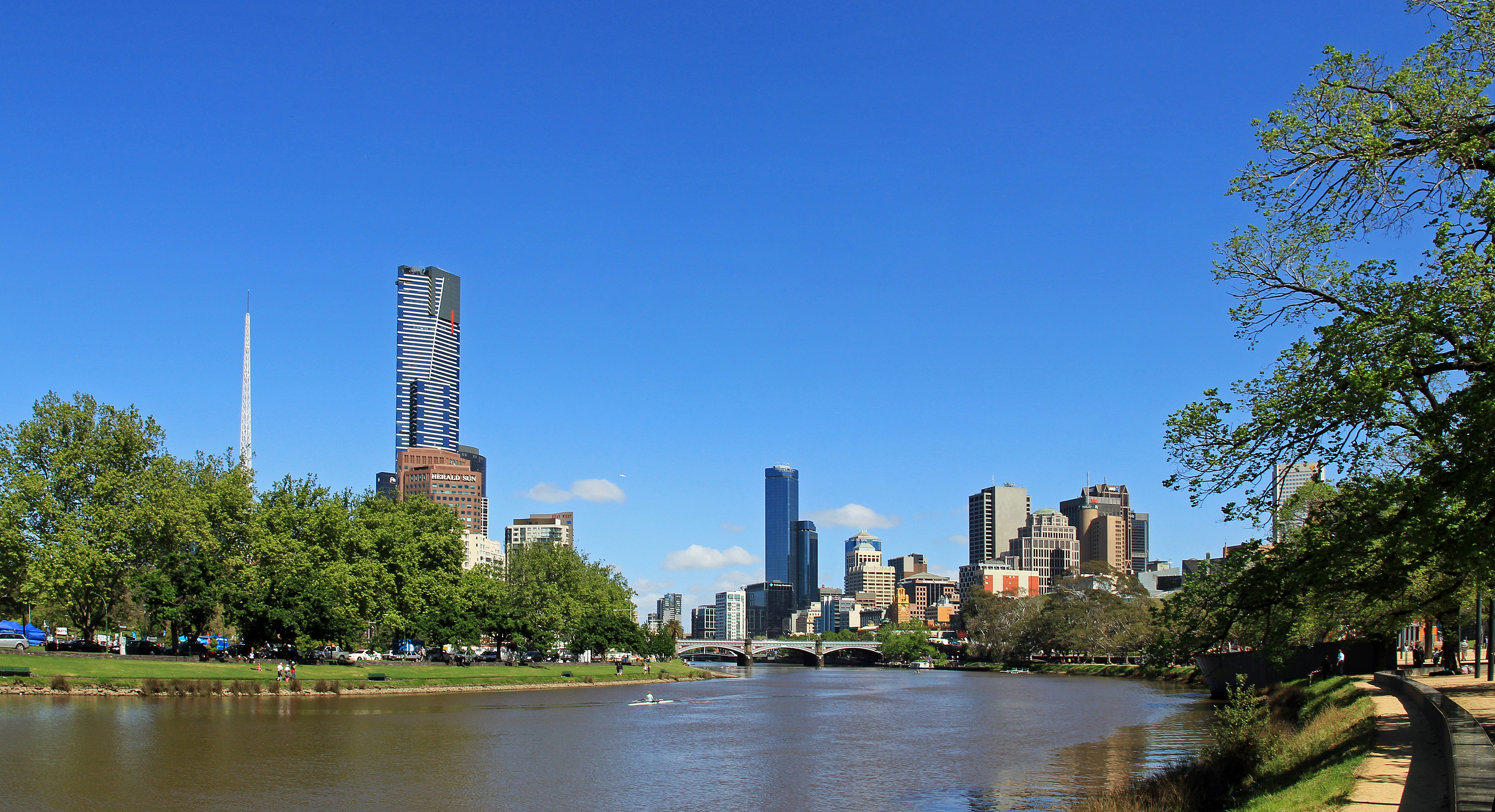
- Boathouses in Alexandra Gardens from across the Yarra River

- Location within Melbourne
- Interactive map of Alexandra Gardens
- Type: Urban park
- Location: Melbourne, Victoria, Australia
- Coordinates: 37°49′13″S 144°58′19″E
- Area: 5.2 ha (13 acres)
- Opened: 1901; 125 years ago
- Designer: Carlo Catani
- Etymology: Alexandra of Denmark
- Operator: City of Melbourne
- Open: All year
- Status: Open
- Paths: Sealed
- Terrain: Flat; riverbank
- Water: Yarra River
- Vegetation: Australian Native; lawns; European gardens
- Public transit: – Flinders Street, Anzac; –; –; – Federation Square, Capital City Trail
- Landmarks: Yarra River; Historic boatsheds; Skate park; Star-shaped garden
- Facilities: Barbecues; bicycle hire; drinking fountains; kiosk; seating and shelters; toilets
- Website: melbourne.vic.gov.au

Australian National Heritage List
- Official name: Melbourne's Domain Parkland and Memorial Precinct
- Type: Historic
- Criteria: A, B
- Designated: 11 February 2018
- Reference no.: 106305

Victorian Heritage Register
- Official name: Domain Parklands
- Type: Registered place
- Designated: 25 July 2013
- Reference no.: H2304
- Category: Parks, Gardens and Trees
- Heritage overlay no.: HO398

The Alexandra Gardens is a 5.2-hectare (13-acre) urban park located on the south bank of the Yarra River, opposite Federation Square and the city centre of Melbourne, in Victoria, Australia.

The gardens are bounded by the Yarra River to the north, Princes and Swan street bridges, with Queen Victoria Gardens and Kings Domain across Alexandra Avenue to the south. Created in 1901 under the direction of Carlo Catani, Chief Engineer of the Public Works Department, the Alexandra Gardens were named in honour of Alexandra of Denmark, in the year her reign as Queen Consort of the United Kingdom and the British Dominions and Empress consort of India began.

The park is located on the traditional lands of the Wurundjeri Woi-wurung people; and is administered by the City of Melbourne.

== Domain Parklands ==
Alexandra Gardens is part of a 123-hectare (300-acre) larger area of parklands directly south-east of the city, bounded by the Yarra River, Anderson Street, Domain Road and St Kilda Road, collectively known as the Domain Parklands. In addition to Alexandra Gardens, these parklands also include Alexandra Park, the Kings Domain and Kings Doman South, Queen Victoria Gardens, the Sidney Myer Music Bowl, Melbourne Gardens (Royal Botanic Gardens), Melbourne Observatory, the Shrine of Remembrance Reserve and Government House Reserve.

The Domain Parkland and Memorial Precinct (Note: The area on the Australian National Heritage List included St Kilda Road and the Melbourne Observatory. However, it excluded the Royal Botanic Gardens.) was added to the Australian National Heritage List on 12 February 2018 by the Australian Government in recognition of the Domain's association with Australia's national heritage – in particular, as a place where the Traditional Owners asserted control to ensure the return and (re)burial of their ancestors is in accordance with their cultural protocols. The precinct also demonstrates a rare government domain with strong Victorian era components of significant to the Australian people.

Additionally, the entire Domain Parklands were added to the Victorian Heritage Register on 25 July 2013 by the Government of Victoria in recognition of its historical, archaeological, aesthetic, architectural, scientific (horticultural), and social significance to the State of Victoria.

== History ==
From the time of European settlement of Melbourne in 1835, the area of the gardens was used for timber cutting, cattle grazing and as a brickmakers' field. Regular flooding occurred until a new channel for the Yarra River was dug from 1896 to 1900 to straighten and widen the river. The spoil was used to fill the swampy lagoons and brickmakers pits and raise the height of the river bank where Alexandra Gardens now stands. Landscaping occurred immediately, and the gardens were planned and laid out for the visit of the Duke of York in May 1901.

== Description ==
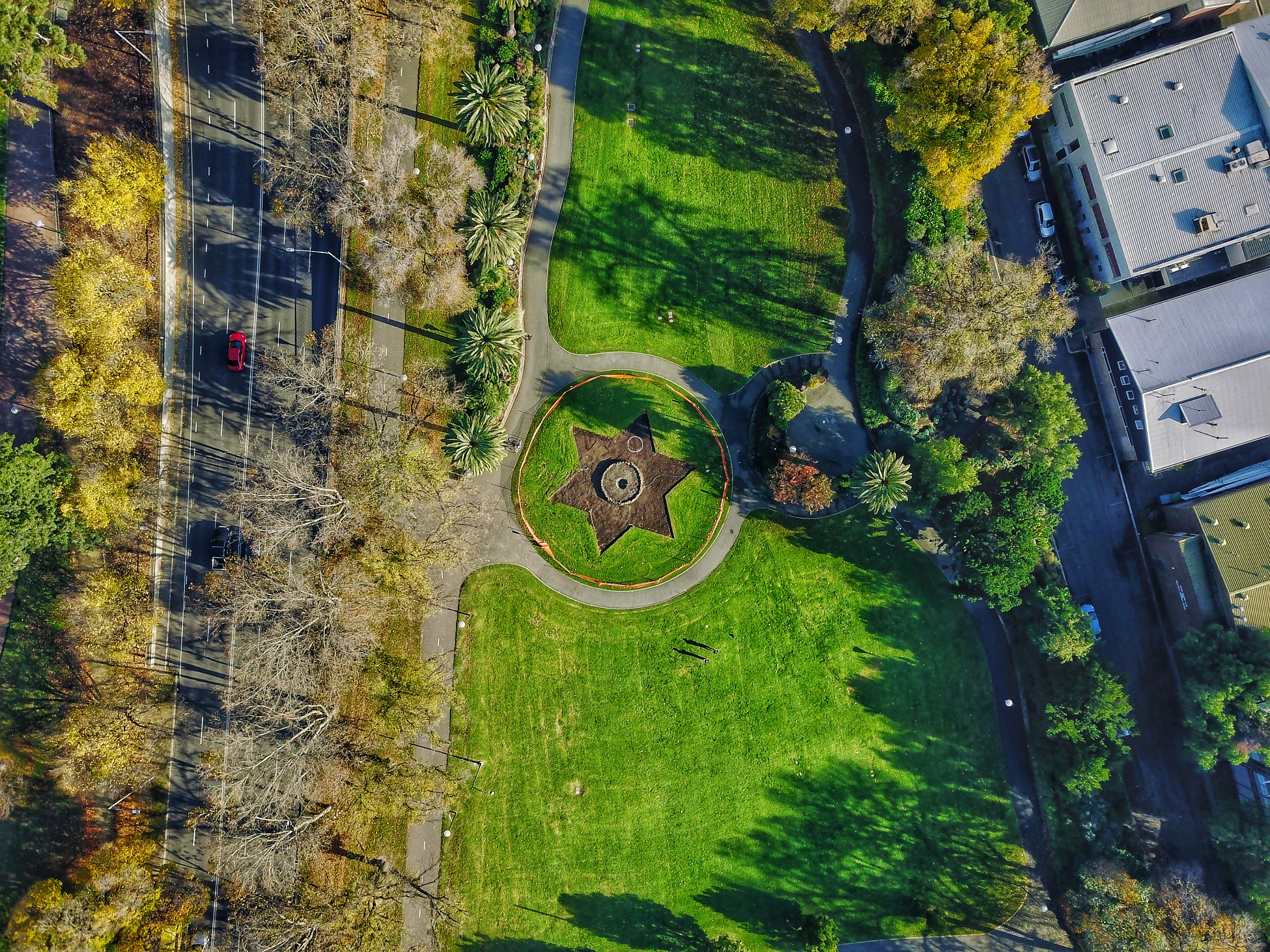
Aerial perspective of the star-shaped garden bed

The gardens’ palms, ornamental shrubs, rockeries and tree-lined avenues and lawns make it an attractive destination for walking. The star-shaped garden bed in the centre of the gardens, designed to represent the Federation of Australia. The gardens are a settling for major events, including the Moomba Festival, Midsumma Festival, and New Year's Eve celebrations.

Past the boathouses are lawns with electric barbecues, which are popular spots for picnics and office parties around Christmas time. As well as lawns fronting the Yarra River, the gardens contain many mature trees including elms and an avenue of planes and oak trees along Boathouse Drive; and ornamental flower beds.

=== Cycling and skating ===
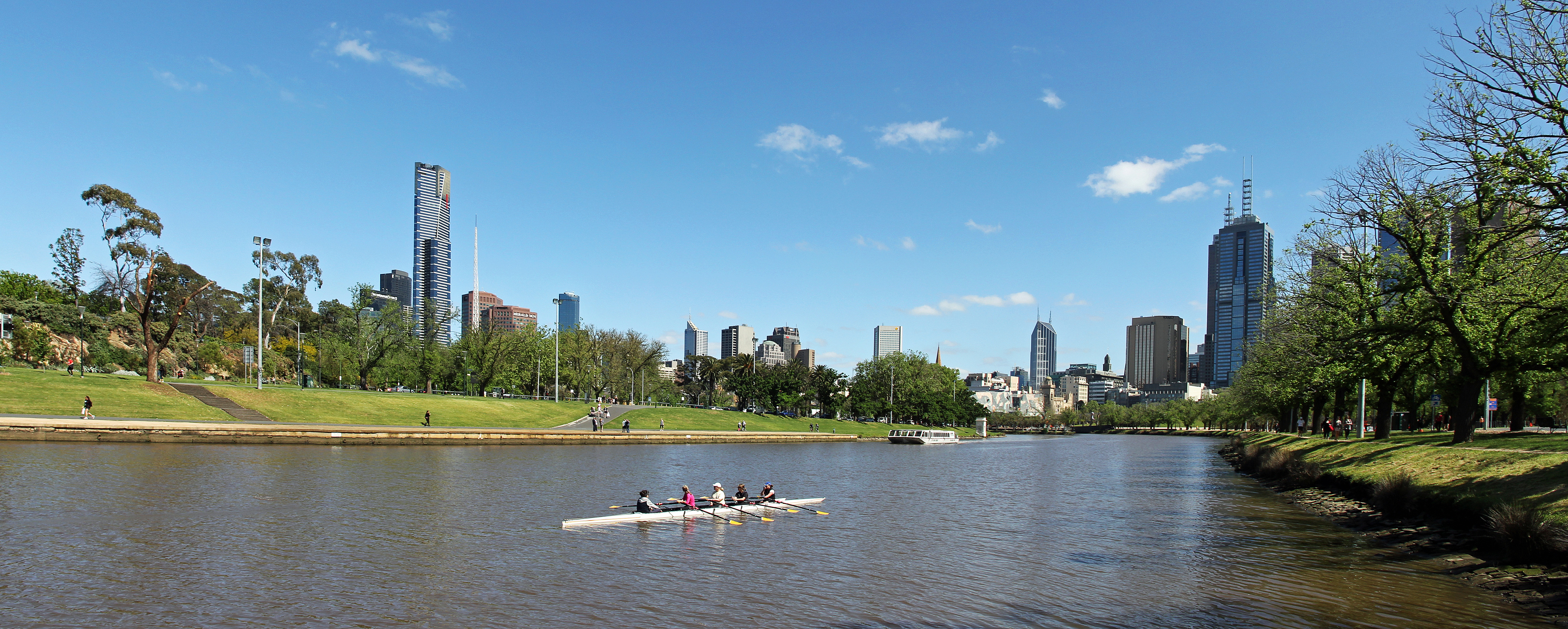
Yarra River & Melbourne city skyline, viewed from Alexandra Gardens

Pedestrian and cycle access to the gardens is via steps or a ramp from Princes Bridge, or along the promenade from Southbank under Princes Bridge. Vehicular access is provided by Boathouse Drive from Alexandra Avenue. Next to Princes Bridge bicycles are available for hire to explore the Capital City Trail along the river. Also the prominent, The Around the Bay in a Day cycling event has its finish line at the Gardens.

A skate park opened in 2001 in the gardens, with a café and first aid station, close to some distinctive Canary Island date palms that were planted in 1911.

=== Rowing ===
Alongside the Yarra River numerous rowing club boathouses nestle in the gardens, including the Mercantile Rowing Club. The Olympic champions, the Oarsome Foursome, were known to train along the Yarra River.

The annual Henley-on-Yarra regatta was held from 1904, every spring just before Melbourne Cup day. For a day and a night, Melburnians flocked to the Yarra to watch this sporting event, with attendances peaking at 300,000 in 1925. After World War II, the event declined in significance, however the annual Australian Henley Rowing Regatta still occurs as an amateur event in December, with recent attempts to increase its popularity.

== See also ==
- Parks and gardens of Melbourne
- Heritage gardens in Australia
- List of public art in Melbourne
