= Mount Buffalo National Park =

National park in Australia

- IUCN category II (national park)
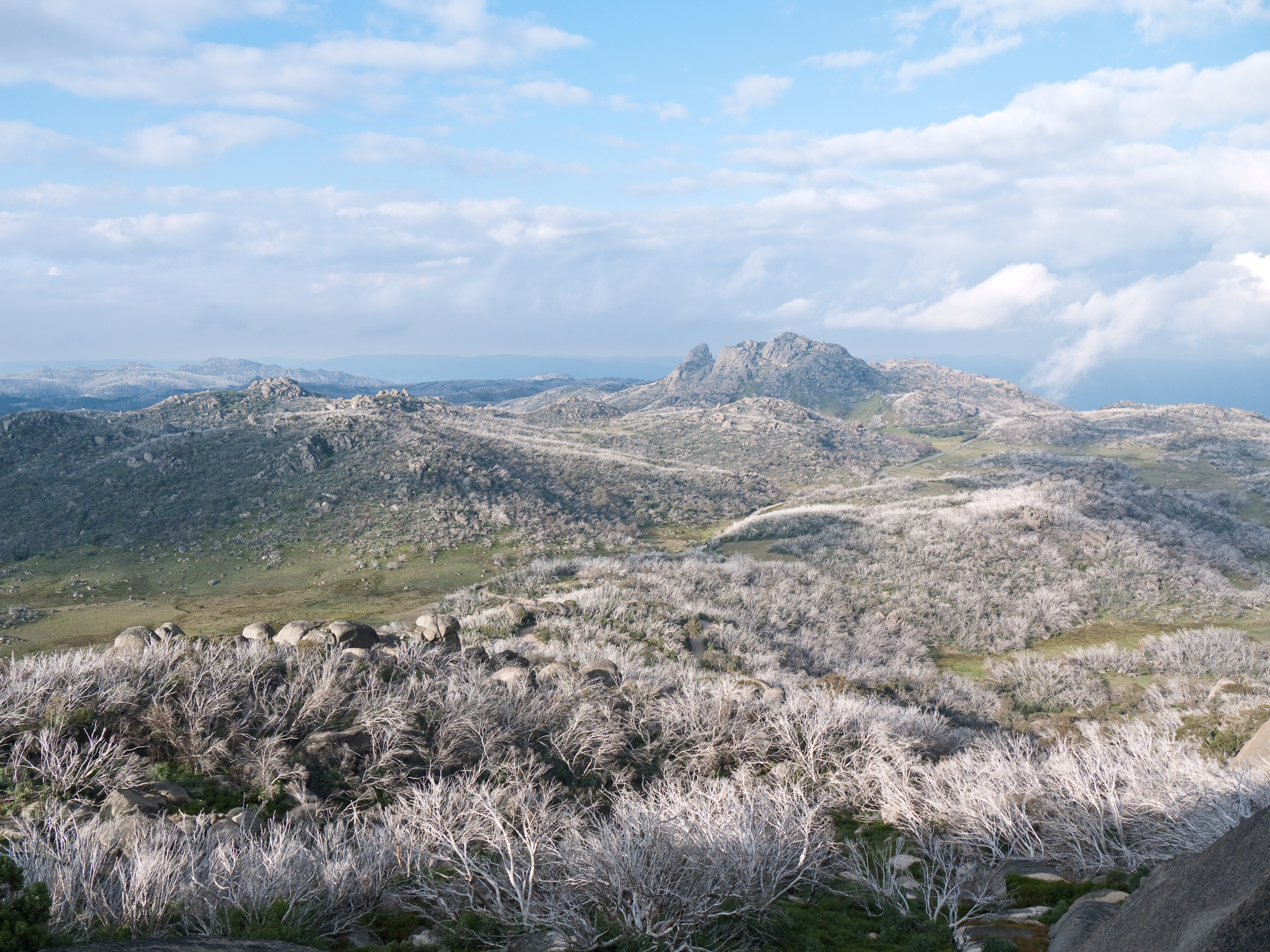
- Mount Buffalo plateau as seen from below The Horn.

- Location within Victoria
- Interactive map of Mount Buffalo National Park
- Location: Victoria
- Nearest city: Porepunkah
- Coordinates: 36°44′18″S 146°46′30″E
- Area: 310 km^{2} (120 sq mi)
- Established: 1898
- Visitors: circa 200,000 (in 1996)
- Governing body: Parks Victoria
- Website: Official website

Aerial views of Mount Buffalo.

The Mount Buffalo National Park is a national park in the alpine region of Victoria, Australia. The 31,000-hectare (77,000-acre) national park is located approximately 350 kilometres (220 mi) northeast of Melbourne in the Australian Alps. Within the national park is Mount Buffalo, a moderately high mountain plateau, with an elevation of 1,723 metres (5,653 ft) above sea level.

On 4 November 1898 an area of 1,166 hectares (2,880 acres) was reserved around the plateau and Eurobin Falls as Mount Buffalo National Park, making it one of the oldest national parks in Australia. In 1908 a road was opened to the plateau and the park was expanded to 10,406 hectares (25,710 acres); and in 1980 to its current size to take in most of the surrounding foothill country.

On 7 November 2008, the park was added to the Australian National Heritage List as one of eleven areas constituting the Australian Alps National Parks and Reserves.

== Location and features ==
Mount Buffalo is a moderately tall mountain plateau on the west side of the Victorian Alpine region. The top of the mountain has striking granite boulders and rock formations. From the north, the mountain is quite remarkable, with the highest accessible point being a prominent peak called The Horn. A walking track leads to The Horn and visitors can enjoy a 360 degree view from the top.

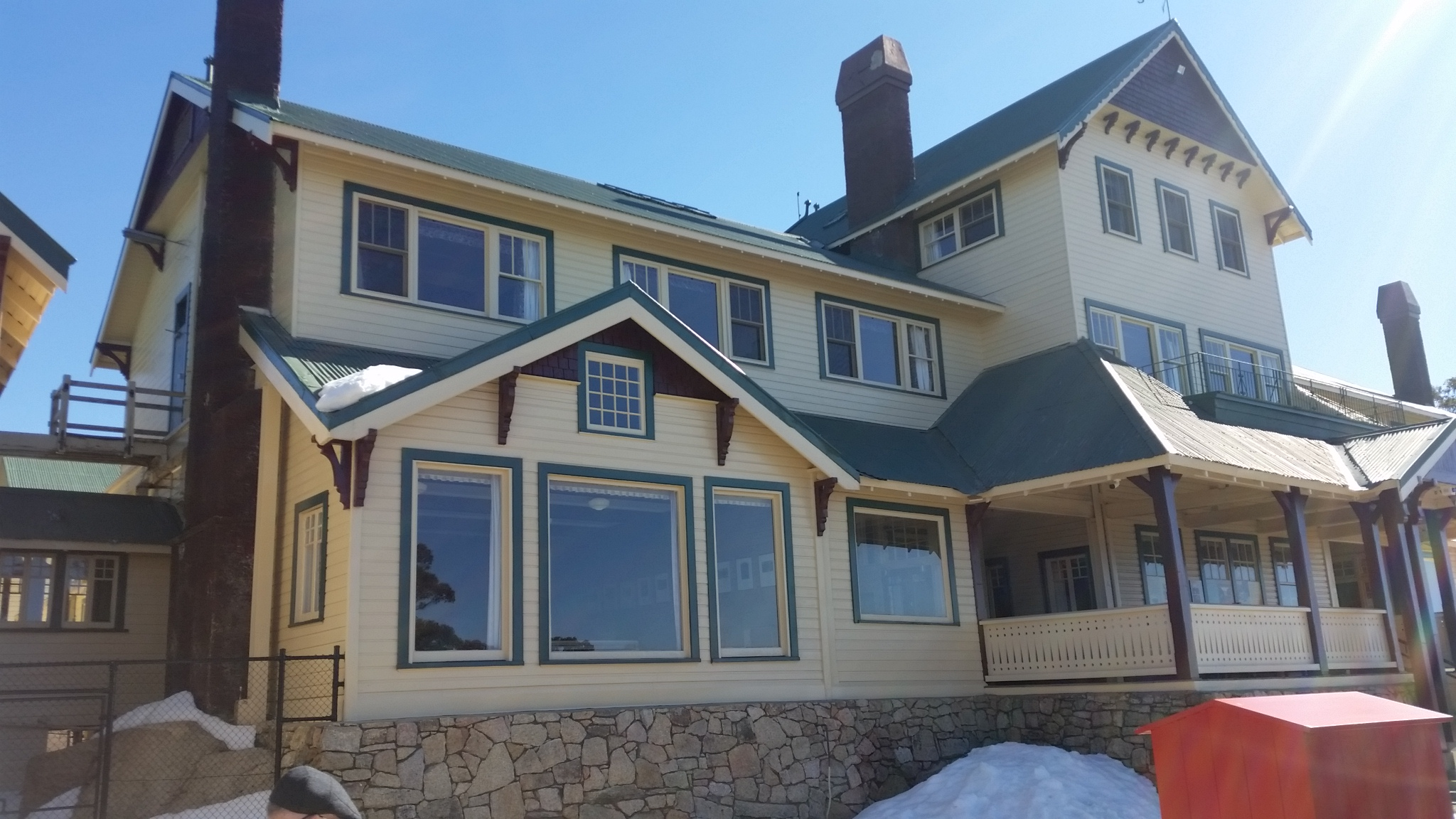
Mount Buffalo Chalet after restoration work in 2018.

Visitor accommodation was available at the historic guest house, the Mount Buffalo Chalet, built in 1910, until January 2007. Parks Victoria and the Victorian Government undertook restoration work on the exterior and gardens of the Chalet in 2017 and 2018. The chalet overlooks large sheets of granite and has views of the Ovens Valley and Buckland Valley below.

Tatra Inn, a lodge located at the west end of the plateau near the cathedral, was destroyed in 2006 by an escaped fuel reduction burn. This is a rock climbing, abseiling and hang-gliding site, and there is adventure caving at Mount Buffalo. The camping ground at Lake Catani is open from November to April.

During the winter season, Mount Buffalo is a destination for cross-country skiing. There are a number of cross-country ski trails near the cathedral (Cresta), and toboggan runs at Dingo Dell and Cresta Valley, both of which are used by beginners. Cross-country lessons and many cross-country trails for more experienced skiers are also available. Visitors stay in the nearby towns of Porepunkah and Bright.

== History ==
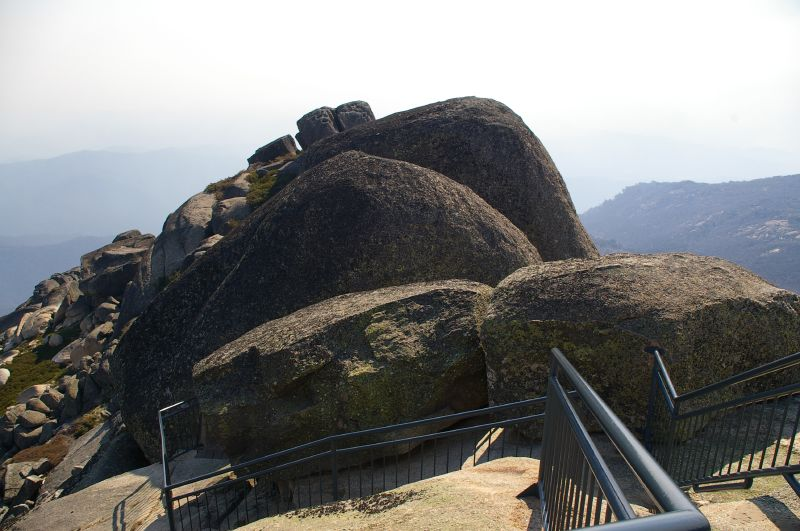
Rocks forming The Horn on Mount Buffalo

Mitambuta and Taungurung people climbed Mount Buffalo in summer to feast on protein-rich bogong moths, and also to meet and hold ceremonies.

Explorers Hume and Hovell named the mountain in 1824 because of its supposed resemblance to a reclining buffalo. Gold miners and botanists later visited the area. With the beginning of tourism in the 1880s, an area around the Gorge was reserved as a national park in 1898. The park has been enlarged several times since and now takes in all the plateau and surrounding slopes. The Mount Buffalo Chalet was built in 1910, soon after the first road to the plateau was constructed, replacing some earlier more "rustic" accommodation. The park became a holiday destination for succeeding generations and a place for early skiing and ice skating ventures. Mount Buffalo had the first ski tow in Australia.

When the Mount Buffalo Chalet was run by the Victorian Railways the restaurant was known as an official "Railways Refreshment Room". Staff worked in railway uniforms, blew whistles and imposed curfews for guests. Railway tickets were issued for equipment and activities such as "Motor to Wangaratta" and "Skis, steel edged with cane stocks and boots 2nd Grade 8/6-".

In late 2006, during the early stages of the huge 2006–07 Victorian Alps Fire Complex, bushfires raged through parts of the national park. The fires destroyed the Cresta Lodge, however the historic Chalet was saved despite being thought to be under threat.

== Fauna ==
Due to the range in altitude in the park, there are a variety of fauna habitats. The foothill forests contain kangaroos, wallabies, and several species of possums and sugar gliders. Smaller mammals such as native rats and mice inhabit the plateau. Wombats occur in all habitats. The alpine silver xenica is a species of butterfly found only on the plateau of Mount buffalo. Bogong moths shelter in rock crevices at the horn and it is common to see birds darting in and out of the cracks to feed on them during the day and bats doing the same at night. Peregrine falcons sometimes nest in the granite rock faces. Crimson rosellas are abundant throughout the park.

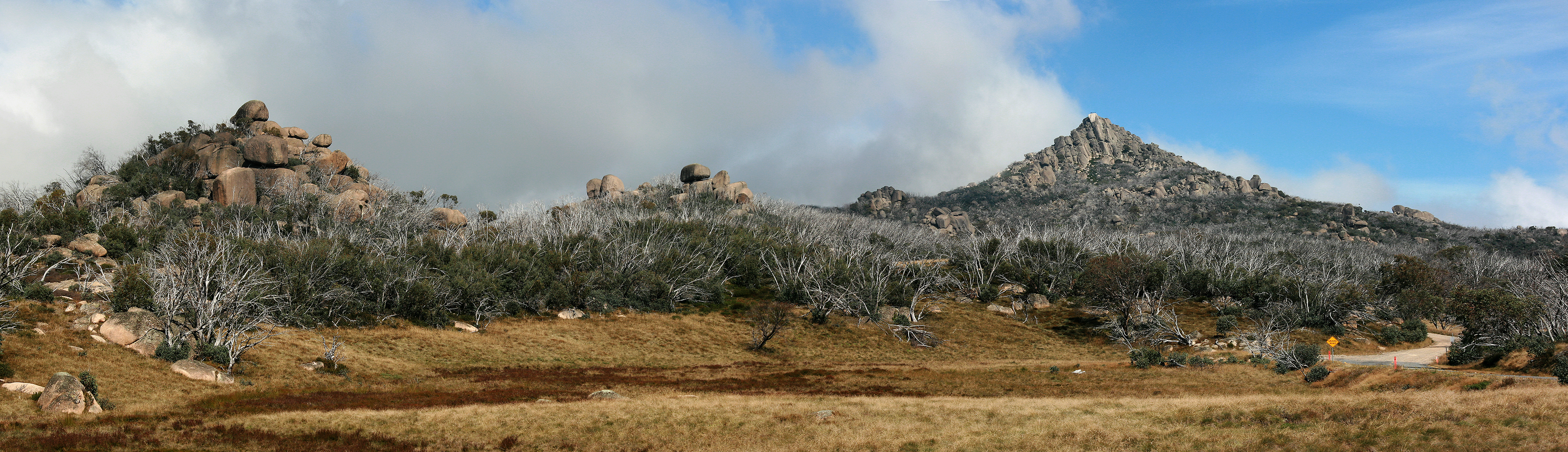
Panoramic view across the Mt Buffalo plateau, with Buffalo's highest peak, The Horn, towards image right; the safety railing for walkers can be seen at the top. The large number of dead trees visible resulted from the 2006–07 Victorian Alps Fire Complex which significantly impacted Mt Buffalo.

== Climate ==
Climate data are sourced from Mount Buffalo Chalet, situated at an altitude of 1,350 metres (4,430 ft). An extreme winter rainfall peak is noted, with a large quantity falling as heavy snow.

Climate data for Mount Buffalo Chalet (1910–1980, rainfall to 2021); 1,350 m AMSL; 36.72° S, 146.82° E
Month	Jan	Feb	Mar	Apr	May	Jun	Jul	Aug	Sep	Oct	Nov	Dec	Year
Record high °C (°F)	31.7 (89.1)	31.9 (89.4)	28.3 (82.9)	24.4 (75.9)	18.9 (66.0)	15.0 (59.0)	14.0 (57.2)	16.0 (60.8)	19.6 (67.3)	21.5 (70.7)	26.1 (79.0)	29.5 (85.1)	31.9 (89.4)
Mean daily maximum °C (°F)	19.7 (67.5)	19.5 (67.1)	16.7 (62.1)	11.8 (53.2)	8.0 (46.4)	5.2 (41.4)	3.9 (39.0)	4.8 (40.6)	7.9 (46.2)	11.1 (52.0)	14.3 (57.7)	17.5 (63.5)	11.7 (53.1)
Mean daily minimum °C (°F)	10.9 (51.6)	11.3 (52.3)	9.1 (48.4)	5.5 (41.9)	2.7 (36.9)	0.4 (32.7)	−0.6 (30.9)	−0.2 (31.6)	1.7 (35.1)	3.8 (38.8)	6.3 (43.3)	9.1 (48.4)	5.0 (41.0)
Record low °C (°F)	0.8 (33.4)	1.5 (34.7)	−0.8 (30.6)	−3.5 (25.7)	−7.2 (19.0)	−5.0 (23.0)	−5.6 (21.9)	−6.0 (21.2)	−6.6 (20.1)	−8.1 (17.4)	−2.5 (27.5)	−1.1 (30.0)	−8.1 (17.4)
Average precipitation mm (inches)	89.3 (3.52)	87.0 (3.43)	99.5 (3.92)	126.3 (4.97)	186.9 (7.36)	207.5 (8.17)	225.1 (8.86)	217.7 (8.57)	192.1 (7.56)	183.5 (7.22)	129.7 (5.11)	111.7 (4.40)	1,856.3 (73.09)
Average precipitation days (≥ 0.2 mm)	6.6	6.7	7.4	9.0	12.2	13.5	14.5	15.0	13.6	12.5	10.2	8.9	130.1
Source: Australian Bureau of Meteorology; Mount Buffalo Chalet

== Vegetation ==
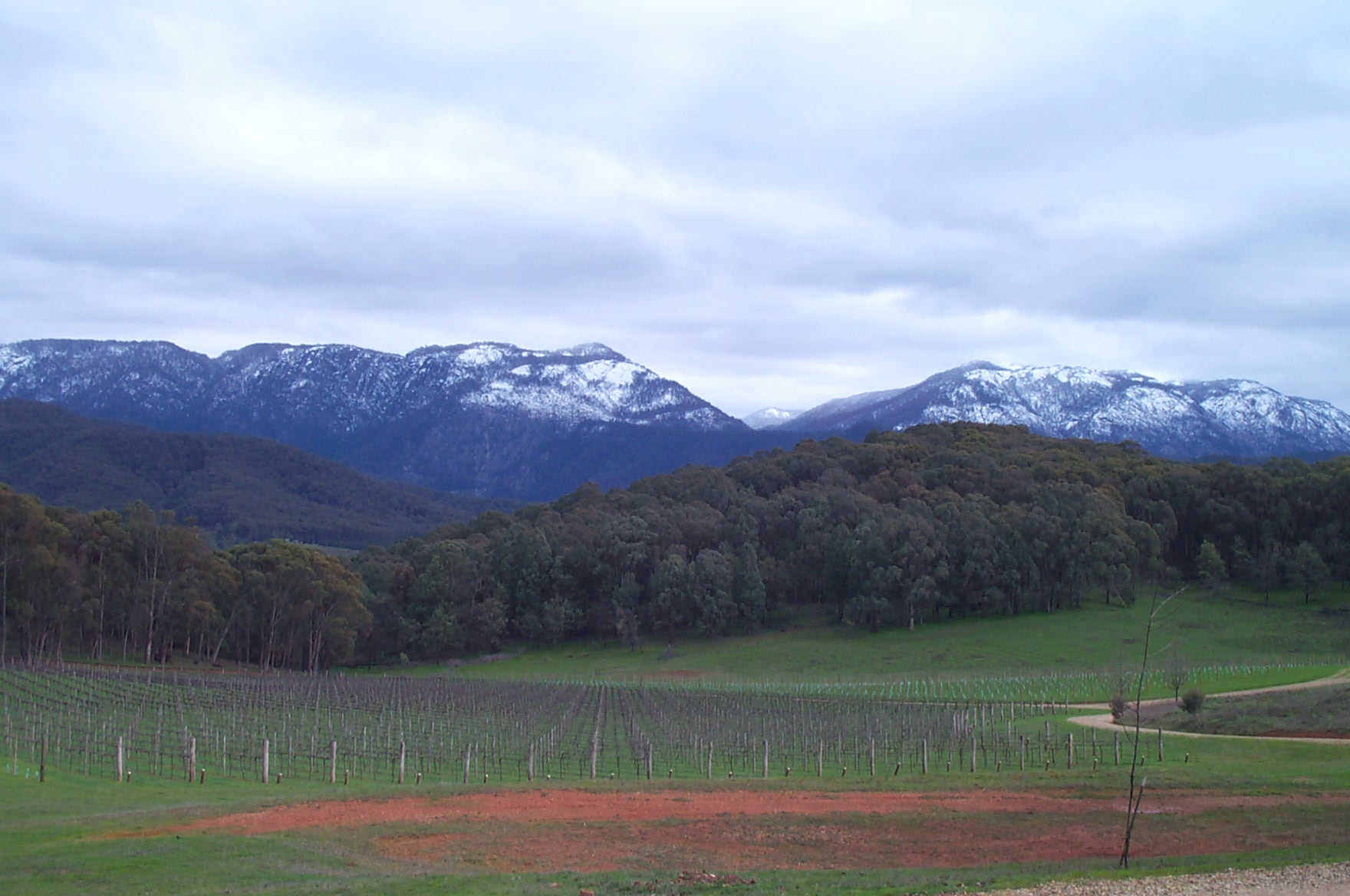
View of Mt Buffalo in winter.

Over 550 native species occur; the most significant vegetation communities are the alpine and sub-alpine communities. The lower slopes have communities of mixed gum and peppermint, including the bogong gum (Eucalyptus chapmaniana). These grade into pure stands of alpine ash (Eucalyptus delegatensis) around 1,100 metres (3,600 feet) elevation, and subalpine woodland of snow gum, (Eucalyptus pauciflora) above 1,300 metres (4,300 feet). The majority of the plateau is at an elevation of 1,500 metres (4,900 feet), where inverted treelines in valley bottoms give rise to grasslands, with bog and fen communities of Sphagnum and Empodisma in watercourses.

The endemic eucalypt Eucalyptus mitchelliana, the Buffalo sallee, is found on higher granite outcrops. Other endemic plants are Grevillea alpivaga (Buffalo grevillea), Acacia phlebophylla (Buffalo sallow wattle), and Babingtonia crenulata (fern-leaf baeckea). The rare Pratia gelida, snow pratia, occurs in a small area on Hospice Plain.

Grazing was excluded from the park in 1957, one of the earliest exclusions of this activity in any alpine park. Weed species, particularly Himalayan honeysuckle, yarrow and blackberries, pose a continuing management challenge.

== Fungi ==
Mount Buffalo National Park is also home to an enormous diversity of fungi. Fungi are ecologically important and megadiverse, yet their significance in underpinning the terrestrial ecology of the park is little recognised.

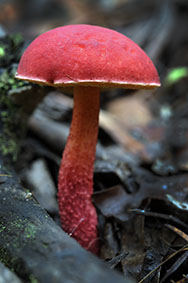
Boletellus obscurecoccineus, rhubarb bolete

The park also contains a great variety of lichens (which are classified as fungi), many of which are important pioneer species, and some of which are restricted to alpine habitats. Although the Management Plan for Mount Buffalo National Park makes no reference to fungi, the park has a great variety of fungi that perform beneficial ecological roles. As primary recyclers of organic matter, saprobic fungi break down fallen branches and leaf litter, making vital nutrients available to other organisms. Other fungi form symbiotic relationships with other organisms. Although rarely acknowledged, the great majority of plants in Mount Buffalo National Park (indeed in the world) form mutually beneficial mycorrhizal relationships with fungi.

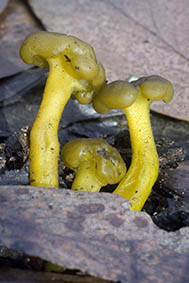
Leotia lubrica

Given the great diversity of plants, specialist habitats and micro-climates in the park, a great diversity of fungi, including lichens, is also expected to occur there. Several hundred fungal species have already been recorded by field naturalists and interested individuals and a list can be found in the Atlas of Living Australia. Leotia lubrica commonly known as the jelly baby grows in leaf litter, moss and soils in the wetter parts of the park. The yellow gelatinous fruitbodies typically grows in clumps. The rhubarb bolete, Boletellus obscurecoccineus is a distinctive species that grows in soils in association with Eucalyptus species. The Australian citizen-science organisation, Fungimap is documenting and mapping the distribution of fungi including those that occur in national parks.

Despite their essential roles in supporting ecosystems, fungi are barely recognised as a vital part of Australia's biodiversity. Although Australia has national and state level biodiversity conservation strategies there is currently no statewide biodiversity strategy for managing biodiversity in Victoria and the Alpine Shire Council's homepage section on Environmental Protection contains no reference to the protection of fungi.

== Road cycling ==
Mount Buffalo is a popular destination for road cyclists due to the challenging yet scenic climb to the top of the mountain. From the now defunct tollbooth at the base of the mountain to the Mount Buffalo Chalet it's a 20.9 km climb at an average gradient of 4.8%. The climb can be extended by following the road around to the right at the Chalet turn-off and continuing to Dingo Dell or The Horn.

== See also ==
- Alice Manfield (Guide Alice)
- Australian Alps National Parks and Reserves
- Protected areas of Victoria
- Skiing in Australia
- Mount Buffalo
- Great Dividing Range
- Lake Catani
