= Shire of Oxley =

Coordinates: 36°27′S 146°19′E

- Local government area
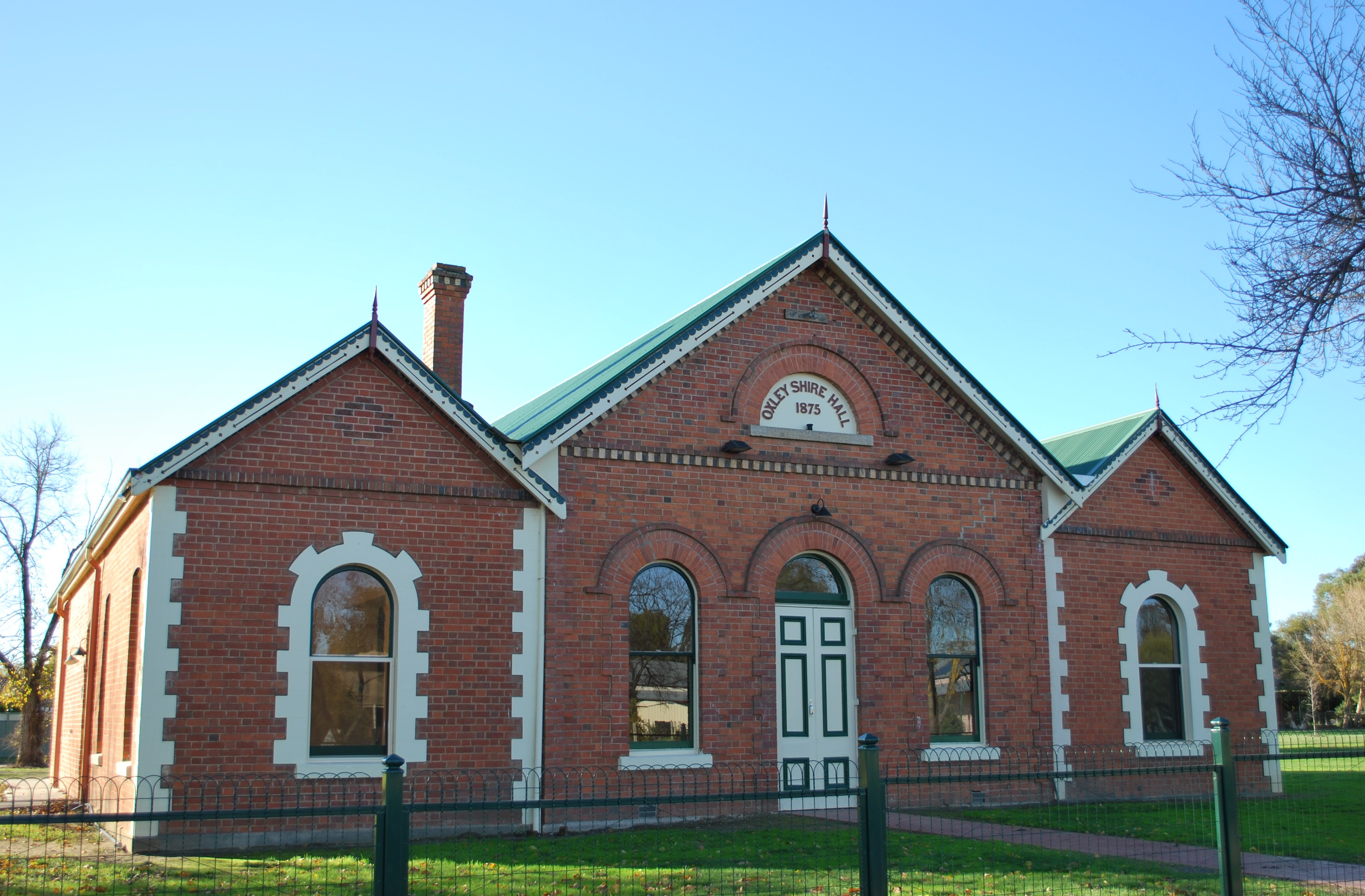
- Oxley Shire Hall
- The Shire of Oxley as at its dissolution in 1994
- Country: Australia
- State: Victoria
- Region: Hume
- Established: 1862
- Council seat: Wangaratta

Area
  - Total: 2,789.2 km^{2} (1,076.9 sq mi)

Population
  - Total(s): 5,310 (1992)
  - Density: 1.9038/km^{2} (4.931/sq mi)
- County: Delatite
LGAs around Shire of Oxley
Wangaratta (C)	Wangaratta (S)	Beechworth
Benalla	Shire of Oxley	Myrtleford
Mansfield	Mansfield	Maffra

The Shire of Oxley was a local government area in Victoria, Australia, immediately to the south of the city of Wangaratta, which housed the shire's council chambers. Oxley covered an area of 2,789.2 square kilometres (1,076.92 sq mi), and existed from 1862 until 1994.

== History ==
The Oxley Road District was incorporated on 21 November 1862, and became a shire on 12 December 1865, after changes to local government legislation. Subsequently, it was divided into Eastern, Central and Western Ridings, each of which elected three councillors.

On 18 November 1994, the Shire of Oxley was abolished, and along with the City of Wangaratta, the Shire of Wangaratta and various surrounding districts, was merged into the newly created Rural City of Wangaratta.

The councillors of the Oxley Shire commissioned Graham Jones to prepare a history of the shire, which was published in 1995 as Memories of Oxley.

== Towns ==
- Bobinawarrah
- Byrne
- Carboor
- Carboor Upper
- Cheshunt
- Claremont
- Docker
- Edi
- Edi Upper
- Greta
- Greta South
- Greta West
- Hansonville
- King Valley
- Laceby
- Markwood
- Meadow Creek
- Milawa
- Moyhu
- Myrrhee
- Oxley
- Oxley Flats
- Ross River
- Whitfield
- Whitlands
- Whorouly
- Whorouly South

== Population ==
Year	Population
1954	4,393
1958	4,570*
1961	5,229
1966	5,356
1971	5,595
1976	4,974
1981	4,860
1986	4,916
1991	5,047

* Estimate in the 1958 Victorian Year Book.
