= List of places on the Victorian Heritage Register in the Rural City of Wangaratta =

This is a list of places on the Victorian Heritage Register in the Rural City of Wangaratta in Victoria, Australia. The Victorian Heritage Register is maintained by the Heritage Council of Victoria.

The Victorian Heritage Register, as of 2026, lists the following fifteen state-registered places within the Rural City of Wangaratta:

Place name	Place #	Location	Suburb or Town	Co-ordinates	Built	State registered	Photo
'Carinya' Ladsons Store	VHR H0568	2328 Beechworth-Wangaratta Road	Tarrawingee	36.389793°S 146.450502°E	1862	6 March 1984	
Bontharambo Homestead	VHR H0359	387 Boorhaman Road	Wangaratta	36.287878°S 146.301219°E	1857	9 October 1974	
Eldorado Dredge	VHR H0386	20 Eldorado-Byawatha Road	Eldorado	36.313750°S 146.502833°E	1935	3 March 1976	
Former ANZ Bank	VHR H0226	49-51 Reid Street	Wangaratta	36.354833°S 146.325583°E	1875	9 October 1974	
Former Flour Mill	VHR H0330	62 Woodberrys Lane	Milawa	36.446222°S 146.406944°E	1861	9 October 1974	
Glenrowan Heritage Precinct	VHR H2000	Siege Street	Glenrowan	36.462972°S 146.224000°E	1880	28 November 2002	
Holy Trinity Anglican Cathedral Close	VHR H1065	Docker Street, Ovens Street, Cusack Street	Wangaratta	36.355611°S 146.321028°E	1856	14 July 2005	
Marianne Gibson Quilt	VHR H2297	Wangaratta Exhibitions Gallery, 56 Ovens Street	Wangaratta	36.355889°S 146.322750°E	1890	9 February 2012	
Old School	VHR H0344	999 Buckland Gap Road	Murmungee	36.446944°S 146.692694°E	1869	9 October 1974	
Plough Inn Hotel and Stables	VHR H0360	2322 Beechworth-Wangaratta Road	Tarrawingee	36.389528°S 146.451333°E	1864	9 October 1974	
Wangaratta Railway Station Complex	VHR H1597	37 Norton Street	Wangaratta	36.354917°S 146.317000°E	1874	20 August 1982	
Warra	VHR H0521	3 Murdoch Road	Wangaratta	36.363194°S 146.324861°E	1908	5 May 1982	
Water Tower and Tank	VHR H1833	12 Millard Street	Wangaratta	36.361389°S 146.324972°E	1902	30 September 1999	
Water Wheel and Mine Machinery	VHR H0356	Weone Mine, Wells Boundary Track	Murmungee	36.440083°S 146.702667°E	1939	9 October 1974	
