= Greta West =

- Town
- Coordinates: 36°32′S 146°13′E
- Country: Australia
- State: Victoria
- Region: Hume
- LGA: Rural City of Wangaratta
- Location: 236 km (147 mi) NE of Melbourne; 24 km (15 mi) SW of Wangaratta; 24 km (15 mi) NE of Benalla; 17 km (11 mi) W of Moyhu

Government
  - State electorate: Ovens Valley
  - Federal division: Indi

Population
  - Total: 162 (2016 census)
- Postcode: 3675

Greta West is a locality in north-east Victoria, Australia. At the 2016 census, Greta West had a population of 162.

Ned Kelly, bushranger, lived for a short while near Greta West.

The township was settled in the 1890s, the Post Office opening on 18 April 1892 (closed 1994).

The closest points of reference are Glenrowan and Moyhu.

== See also ==
- Greta
