= Hansonville, Victoria =

Hansonville
- Town
- Coordinates: 36.592°S 146.254°E
- Country: Australia
- State: Victoria
- Region: Hume
- LGA: Rural City of Wangaratta
- Location: 255 km (158 mi) NE of Melbourne; 28 km (17 mi) S of Wangaratta; 19 km (12 mi) SE of Glenrowan

Government
  - State electorate: Ovens Valley
  - Federal division: Division of Indi
- Elevation: 187 m (614 ft)

Population
  - Total: 248 (incl. Greta South) (2011 census)
- Postcode: 3675
- Mean max temp: 22.4 °C (72.3 °F)
- Mean min temp: 6.9 °C (44.4 °F)

Hansonville is a locality in the Greta district of Victoria, Australia. It is part of the Rural City of Wangaratta. It had a school in 1880. The postcode is 3675.

Roads in the place include Moyhu-Hansonville Rd, Banksdale Rd and Glenrowan-Moyhu Road. In the south part is School Road and Banksdale Road. Factory Creek flows to the north through the area.

People growing up in Hansonville include Tim Newth, co-director of the Tracks Dance Company; Captain Austin Mahony who won a military cross at Pozières; and John Legg (born 1892) a veterinary scientist prominent in the CSIRO.

A polling place for the Division of Indi is located at Greta Complex, Greta Recreation Reserve, Greta West-Greta South Rd. In 2004 this booth returned an 82% vote for liberal and 12% for labor for the House of Representatives.
