= Whitfield, Victoria =

Whitfield
- Town
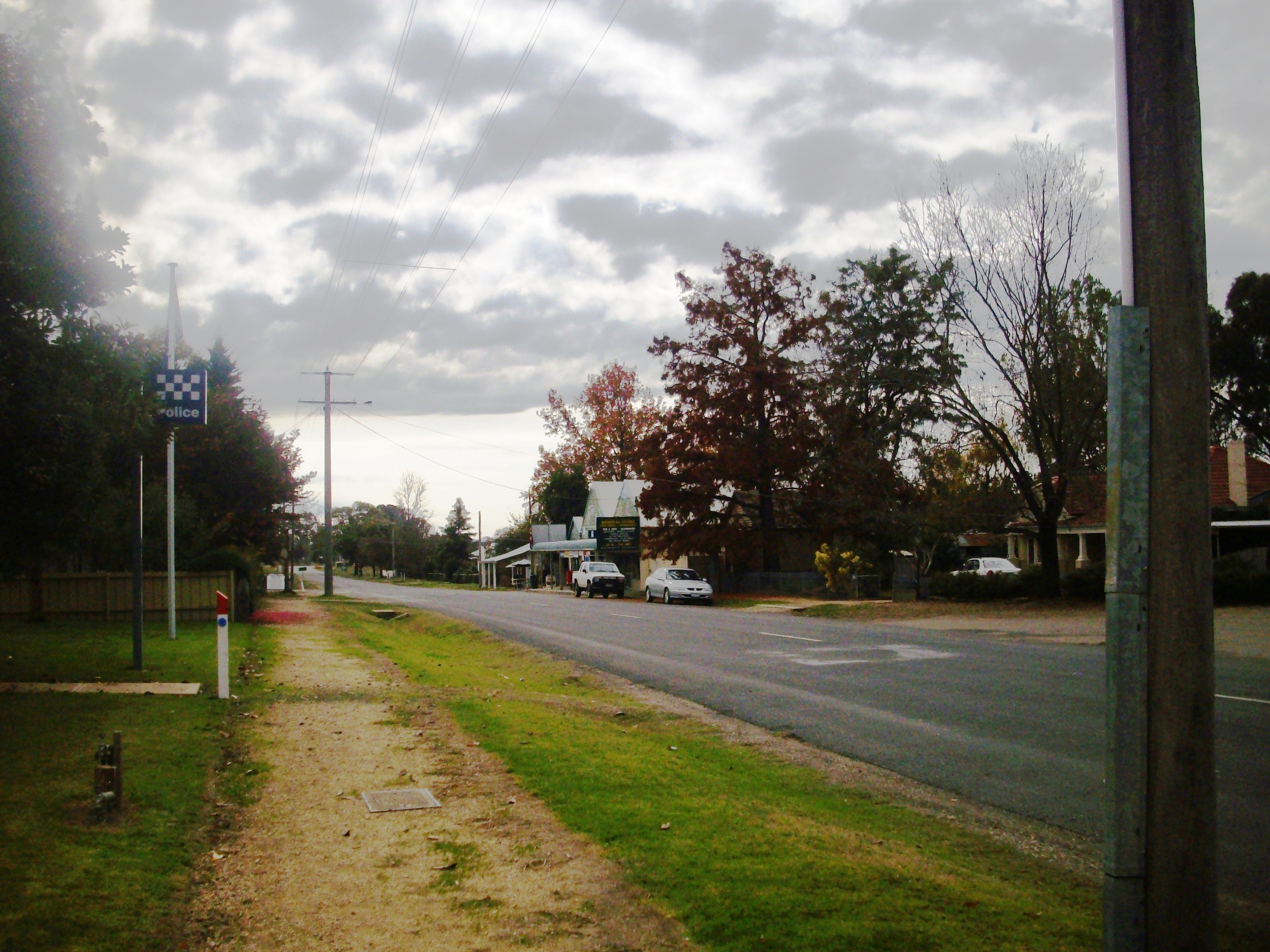
- Main street prior to the 2023 upgrades

- Interactive map of Whitfield
- Coordinates: 36°46′S 146°25′E
- Country: Australia
- State: Victoria
- Region: Hume
- LGA: Rural City of Wangaratta
- Location: 50 km (31 mi) from Wangaratta; 60 km (37 mi) from Mansfield; 245 km (152 mi) from Melbourne

Government
  - State electorate: Ovens Valley
  - Federal division: Indi
- Elevation: 253 m (830 ft)

Population
  - Total: 220 (2021 census)
- Postcode: 3733
- Mean max temp: 8.2 °C (46.8 °F)
- Mean min temp: 20.6 °C (69.1 °F)
- Annual rainfall: 1,033.2 mm (40.68 in)

Whitfield is a viticultural, tourist township in the King Valley in north-eastern Victoria.

== Overview ==
The township is immediately west of the flood-prone King River and has State Forest to its west and east. Agriculture extends along several stream valleys which are tributaries of the King River. At the 2021 census, Whitfield and the surrounding area had a population of 220.

== History ==
Pastoral runs were established in the area in the 1840s but population was small until the 1870s, the Post Office opening on 1 May 1874 as Upper King River and being renamed Whitfield in 1889. The name Whitfield is believed to come from the name of a pastoral run Whitefields. In the early 1900s Whitfield was the site of a Government experimental farm growing tobacco and hops. After World War II many European immigrants settled in the area and grew tobacco.

Commencing in the 1980's many of the tobacco farms converted to vineyards and today Whitfield hosts many independent wineries including Dal Zotto, (famed for the introduction of Prosecco in Australia), Pizzini, Darling Estate, and the Politini and Chrismont wineries in nearby Cheshunt. Many wineries along the Oxley to Cheshunt Road, colloquially known as "Prosecco Road", offer their own Prosseco. There is also the King River Brewery located approximately 4 km before Whitfield. The area holds a number of wine and culinary events throughout the year.

Tragedy struck the township when the only general store in town (which had recently been taken over by new owners) was destroyed in a fire early in 2013.

== Today ==
The township is close to nearby Cheshunt, Victoria, and the localities of Rose River and Dandongadale. Local places of interest include Paradise Falls, Mount Cobbler, Power's Lookout, Lake William Hovell and Wabonga Plateau. Waterfalls, mountain streams, wildflowers and views of the Alps are features of the Wabonga Plateau-Mount Cobbler area of the Alpine National Park. There are tours and places of interest for day visitors as well as those staying longer. Bushwalking, 4WD touring and camping are offered in the area.

Mount Cobbler and the Wabonga Plateau area of the Alpine National Park are often approached from Whitfield. From Melbourne, Whitfield can be reached via the Hume Highway to Wangaratta or via the Maroondah Highway to Mansfield and then via Tolmie. Roads from Benalla, Mansfield and Myrtleford.

=== Facilities ===
Whitfield has a number of facilities as the principal town of the upper King Valley. It is home of the King Valley football team competing in the Ovens and King Football League

In 2023, the Rural City of Wangaratta constructed an adventure playground and visitor hub, including new toilets and footpaths, in the town.

== Transport ==
There is a link between Whitfield and Melbourne's tourist railway Puffing Billy. In 1897 the Victorian Railways accepted the tender from the Baldwin Locomotive Works, Philadelphia, U.S.A. for narrow-gauge locomotives of the ‘A’ Class, (two 2 ft 6 in (762 mm) gauge locomotives) and the first two to be received were placed on the Whitfield/Wangaratta line construction project. Thus the line has the distinction of being the first narrow-gauge line to be built in Victoria. Some of the whistle stop name-boards such as Angleside, Claremont, Dwyer, Pieper and Jarrott can still be seen. The line terminated in Whitfield and still can be seen is the historic locomotive terminus shed at the town center although in a state of near terminal disrepair. There is now a bus service that has replaced the old train system, still taking the same route in and out of Wangaratta. The bus runs on Monday, Wednesday and Friday.

== Climate ==
Climate data for Whitfield are sourced at nearby Edi Upper. Winters are cool to cold, damp and rainy with occasional snow, while summer is warm and sunny interspersed with periods of cooler weather. On 3 February 2005 the maximum temperature did not exceed 10.6 °C (51.1 °F) all day.

Climate data for Edi Upper (1985–2023); 355 m AMSL; 36.74° S, 146.47° E
Month	Jan	Feb	Mar	Apr	May	Jun	Jul	Aug	Sep	Oct	Nov	Dec	Year
Record high °C (°F)	43.0 (109.4)	43.8 (110.8)	37.8 (100.0)	34.2 (93.6)	26.6 (79.9)	20.5 (68.9)	19.4 (66.9)	21.8 (71.2)	27.0 (80.6)	32.5 (90.5)	39.2 (102.6)	40.8 (105.4)	43.8 (110.8)
Mean daily maximum °C (°F)	29.8 (85.6)	29.6 (85.3)	26.1 (79.0)	20.6 (69.1)	16.5 (61.7)	13.1 (55.6)	11.8 (53.2)	13.3 (55.9)	16.2 (61.2)	19.5 (67.1)	23.4 (74.1)	26.8 (80.2)	20.6 (69.0)
Mean daily minimum °C (°F)	14.2 (57.6)	14.0 (57.2)	11.3 (52.3)	8.0 (46.4)	5.9 (42.6)	4.5 (40.1)	3.6 (38.5)	3.8 (38.8)	5.3 (41.5)	7.1 (44.8)	9.7 (49.5)	11.5 (52.7)	8.2 (46.8)
Record low °C (°F)	3.0 (37.4)	3.6 (38.5)	3.2 (37.8)	0.4 (32.7)	−0.8 (30.6)	−2.0 (28.4)	−2.2 (28.0)	−2.4 (27.7)	−1.9 (28.6)	−0.6 (30.9)	0.2 (32.4)	2.5 (36.5)	−2.4 (27.7)
Average precipitation mm (inches)	68.2 (2.69)	55.3 (2.18)	60.8 (2.39)	61.5 (2.42)	91.7 (3.61)	118.2 (4.65)	126.0 (4.96)	116.7 (4.59)	97.1 (3.82)	79.9 (3.15)	81.9 (3.22)	76.8 (3.02)	1,033.2 (40.68)
Average precipitation days (≥ 0.2 mm)	6.6	5.5	6.4	7.0	12.8	14.0	16.2	15.8	13.1	10.4	9.0	8.3	125.1
Average afternoon relative humidity (%)	38	42	44	53	65	74	76	70	65	56	51	43	56
Source: Australian Bureau of Meteorology; Edi Upper
