= King Valley =

Agricultural region in Victoria, Australia

Coordinates: 36°41′41″S 146°24′06″E

- Wine region
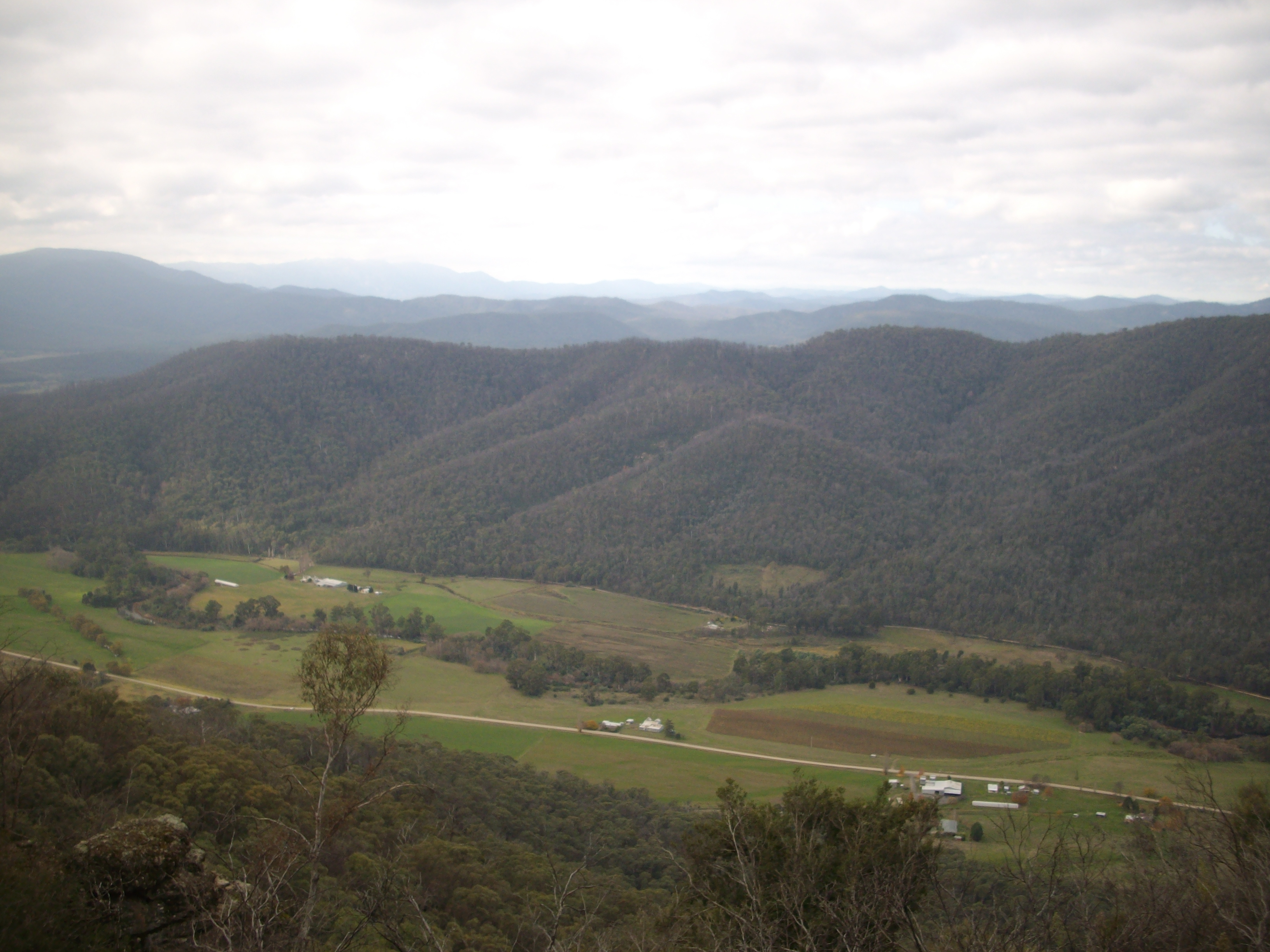
- The upper King Valley seen from Powers Lookout
- Type: Australian Geographical Indication
- Year established: 2007
- Country: Australia
- Part of: North East Victoria
- Heat units: 1350-1580
- Precipitation (annual average): 640 millimetres (25 in) – 1,410 millimetres (56 in)

The King Valley, or King River Valley, is a wine-producing and agricultural region centered on the King River between Wangaratta and the Alpine National Park in North East Victoria, Australia. There are several small towns within the region, including: Cheshunt, Whitfield, King Valley, Edi, Claremont, Moyhu, Byrne, Docker and Oxley. King Valley was recorded as an Australian Geographical Indication protected name on 12 October 2007.

== History ==
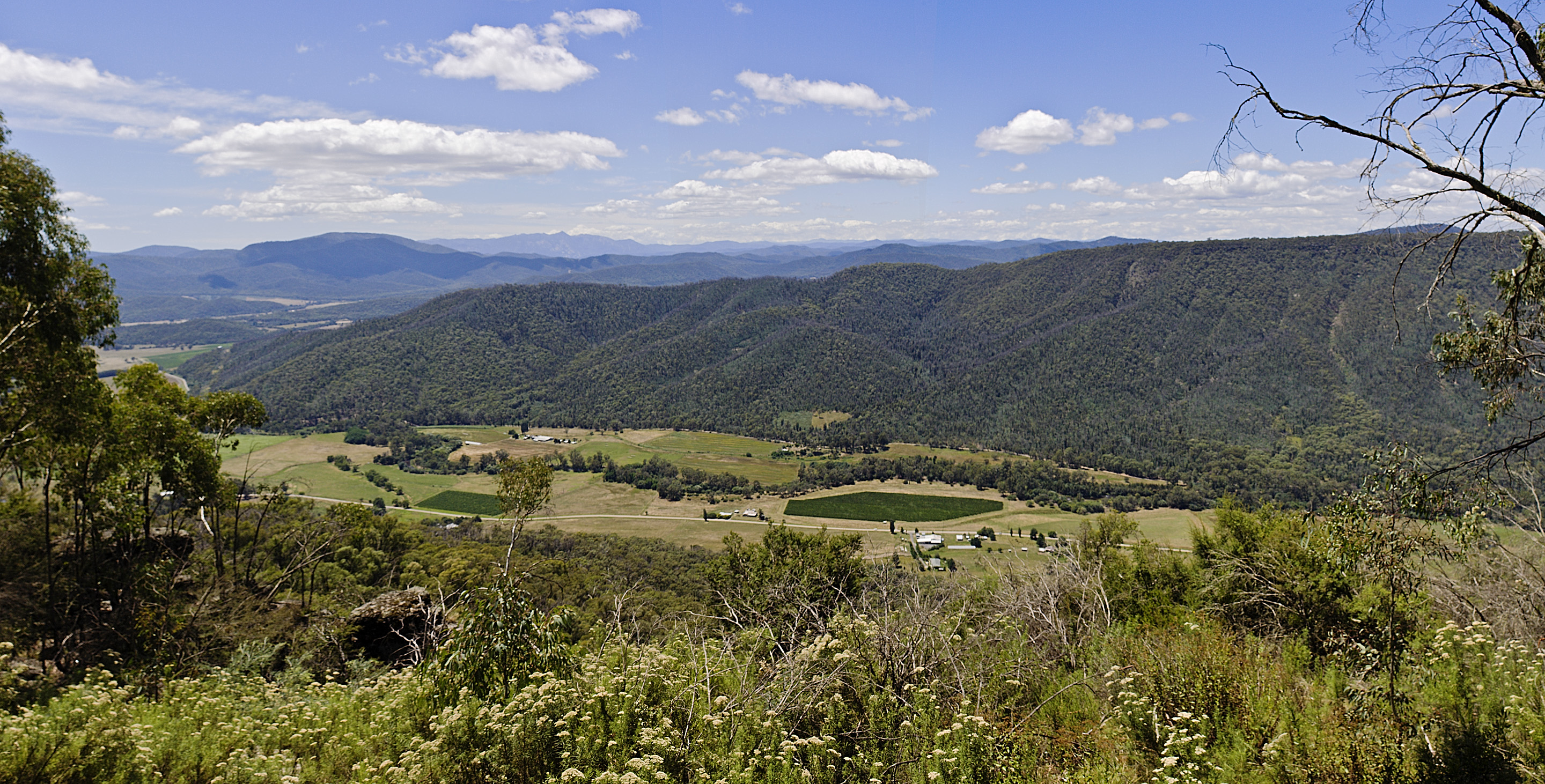
Powers Lookout

The region has been used since the 1880s to grow a variety of crops, including hops and tobacco, alongside dairy and beef cattle production. A narrow-gauge railway was built between Wangaratta and Whitfield in 1889, and a government tobacco research farm was established in Edi and moved to Whitfield in 1902. Following the end of World War II, a large number of Italian, Yugoslav and Spanish migrants settled in the area and established tobacco farms. Following the decline of the tobacco industry in the mid-80s up to its demise in 2006 from government deregulation, local farmers turned to other crops, such as chestnuts, hops, berries, and grapes for wine production.

The King Valley has a history that includes bushrangers, Chinese and Italian immigration. Chinese migrants came from the Victorian Goldfields in the mid-19th century and began careers as market gardeners, tobacco growers and merchants. Many roads in the Valley today carry the names of such families, like Mahlooks, Honey, Laffy and Fosangs. Italian migrants who arrived in the 1940s and 1950s also began tobacco farming, but later switched to producing European wine varietals. The valley eventually gained a reputation as a wine region for sangiovese, nebbiolo and barbera varieties, with the region containing some of the highest-altitude vineyards in Australia, which are around 800 metres (2,600 ft) above sea level on the Whitlands Plateau at the southern end of the region. Milawa is at the northern end with an altitude of 155 metres (509 ft).

The Whitfield railway line operated in the King Valley from 1899 to 1953. One of four narrow gauge lines of the Victorian Railways, the 50-kilometre line operated from Wangaratta (where it connected with the North East railway line) to Whitfield. Today, this route is a rail trail.

Whitfield and Moyhu are the larger townships in the King Valley, located along the road from Wangaratta or Mansfield. The two towns serve as major tourism centers within the Valley, and smaller hamlets are dotted throughout the King Valley region.

== Sport ==
Whitfield has a nine-hole sand scrape public golf course, called the King Valley Golf Club situated on the King Valley Road.

There was a King Valley Cricket Association that was established in 1948, comprising teams from - Carboor, Cheshunt, Dandongadale, Greta, King Valley, Myrrhee and Whitfield.

There was an annual Whitfield Sports Day held annually on Boxing Day from 1905 onwards at the Whitfield Recreation Reserve, which included running, wood chopping and bike riding events.

King Valley Football Association

The King Valley Football Association (KVFA) was formed in 1920 and ran through until 1934. The Whitfield Football Club dominated this competition, playing in 12 grand finals and winning six premierships. The sides that competed in this competition were - Cheshunt, Edi, Greta, King Valley, Moyhu, Moyhu Rovers (Reserves), Myrrhee and Whitfield.

In 1935, the remaining clubs in the KVFA merged to form King Valley United Football Club and entered the Ovens & King Football League and have played there ever since.

King Valley have won two senior Ovens & King Football League football premierships in 1970 and 1981 and two A. Grade netball premierships in 2015 and 2016.

The club's home ground is at the Whitfield Recreation Reserve.

KVFA - Premiers / Grand Finals

| Year | Venue | Premier | G | B | Pts | Runner Up | G | B | Pts | Comments |
|---|---|---|---|---|---|---|---|---|---|---|
| 1920 | Moyhu | Greta (1) | 3 | 5 | 23 | Whitfield (1) | 0 | 3 | 3 | |
| 1921 | Moyhu | Greta (2) | 6 | 7 | 43 | Whitfield (2) | 2 | 1 | 13 | |
| 1922 | Moyhu | Whitfield (1) | 3 | 8 | 24 | Greta (1) | 2 | 5 | 17 | |
| 1923 | | ? | | | | ? | | | | |
| 1924 | Whitfield | Myrrhee (1) | 7 | 7 | 49 | Whitfield (3) | 4 | 11 | 35 | |
| 1925 | Whitfield | Moyhu (1) | 5 | 13 | 43 | Myrrhee (1) | 5 | 3 | 33 | |
| 1926 | Edi | Whitfield (2) | 6 | 7 | 43 | Edi (1) | 4 | 7 | 31 | |
| 1927 | Whitfield | Whitfield (3) | 9 | 8 | 62 | Myrrhee (1) | 6 | 7 | 43 | Sloan Cup |
| 1928 | King Valley | Whitfield | 9 | 8 | 62 | Greta (2) | 2 | 7 | 19 | 1st G Final* |
| 1928 | King Valley | Whitfield (4) | 6 | 5 | 35 | Edi (2) | 2 | 9 | 21 | 2nd G Final |
| 1929 | Edi Upper | Myrrhee (2) | 7 | 18 | 60 | Cheshunt (1) | 6 | 6 | 42 | |
| 1930 | King Valley | Whitfield (5) | 7 | 5 | 47 | Cheshunt (2) | 7 | 2 | 44 | |
| 1931 | Edi | Cheshunt (1) | 7 | 7 | 49 | Whitfield (4) | 6 | 8 | 44 | |
| 1932 | | Cheshunt (2) | | | ? | Whitfield (5) | | | ? | |
| 1933 | Whitfield | Edi (1) | 6 | 7 | 43 | Cheshunt (3) | 4 | 13 | 43 | |
| 1934 | Cheshunt | Whitfield (6) | 11 | 6 | 72 | Edi (3) | 4 | 14 | 38 | |

- 1928 - Greta played an ineligible player and a second grand final was played.
