= Tarrawingee, Victoria =

Tarrawingee
- Town
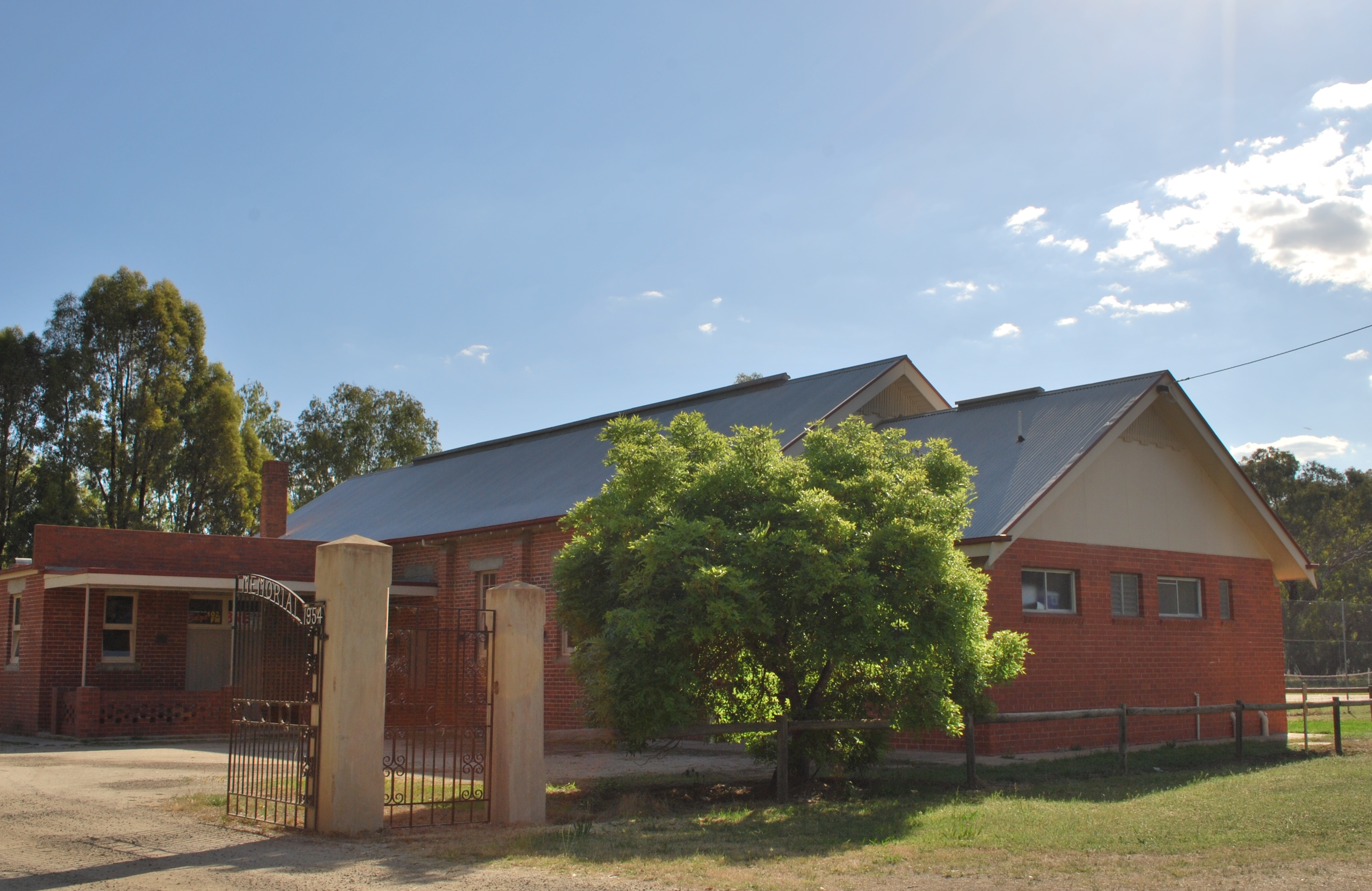
- Public hall

- Interactive map of Tarrawingee
- Coordinates: 36°23′24″S 146°26′59″E
- Country: Australia
- State: Victoria
- Region: Hume
- LGA: Rural City of Wangaratta
- Location: 261 km (162 mi) NE of Melbourne; 12 km (7.5 mi) E of Wangaratta; 10.2 km (6.3 mi) W of Everton

Government
  - State electorate: Ovens Valley
  - Federal division: Indi

Population
  - Total: 416 (SAL 2021)
- Postcode: 3678

Tarrawingee is a town in north eastern Victoria, Australia. The town is located in the Rural City of Wangaratta local government area, 261 km (162 mi) north east of the state capital, Melbourne.

== Sport ==
The Tarrawingee Bulldogs field Australian Rules football teams and netball teams competing in the Ovens & King Football and Netball League. Between 1957 and 1965, a motor racing circuit was used by the North Eastern Car Club for meetings. The circuit was located right next to the Australian rules football oval, which provided spectators with the luxury of a grandstand. The last meeting was held on 4 April 1965, where multiple lap records were broken despite the track starting to break up. A meeting was programmed for November 1965, but in July the North Eastern Car Club formally announced the closure of the circuit, probably due to the costs of resurfacing the track as well as meeting the safety rules demanded by the Confederation of Australian Motor Sport.
