= Oxley, Victoria =

Oxley
- Town
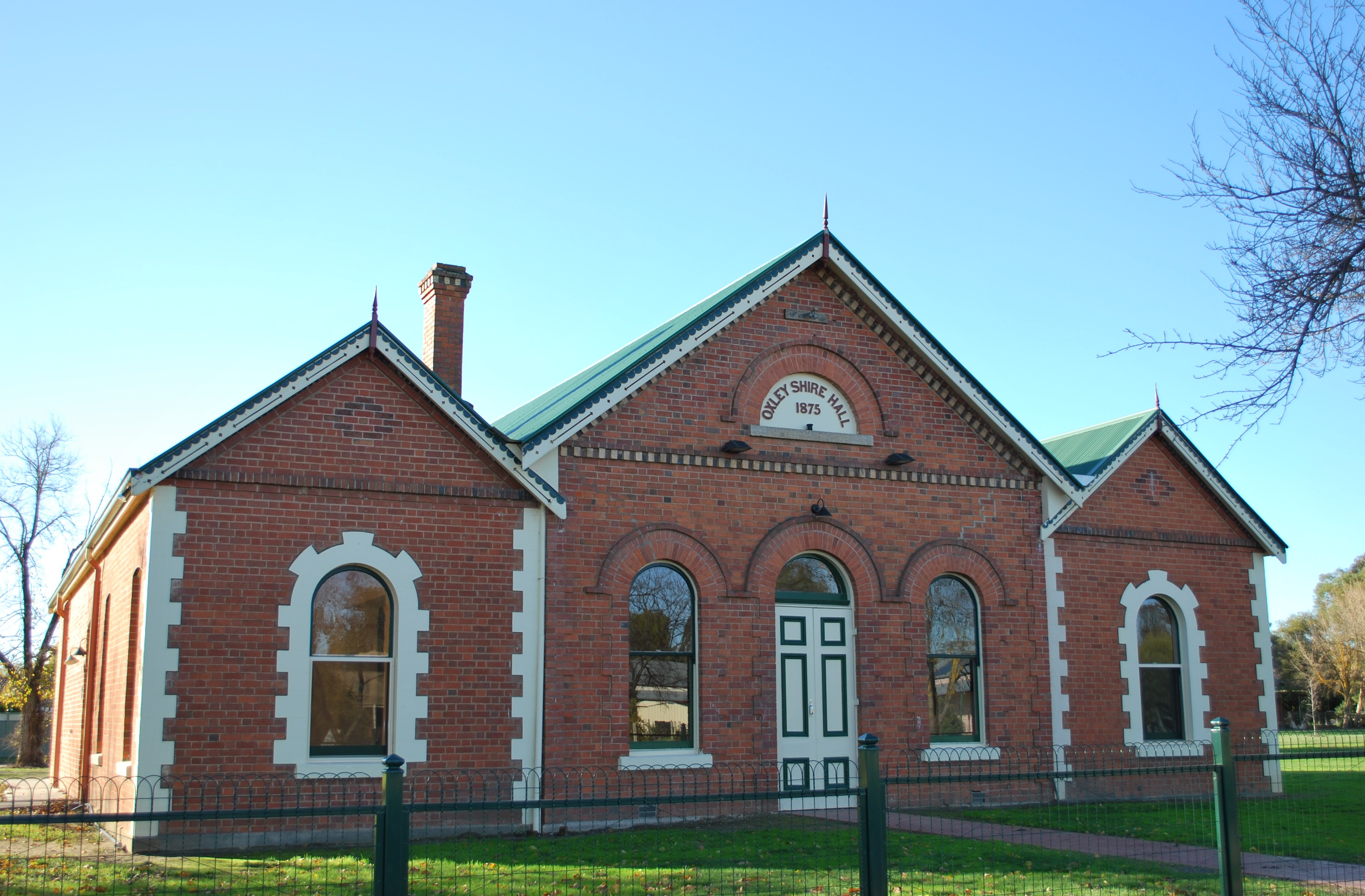
- Oxley Shire Hall, built in 1875

- Interactive map of Oxley
- Coordinates: 36°26′S 146°23′E
- Country: Australia
- State: Victoria
- Region: Hume
- LGA: Rural City of Wangaratta
- Location: 252 km (157 mi) NE of Melbourne; 13.1 km (8.1 mi) SE of Wangaratta

Government
  - State electorate: Ovens Valley
  - Federal division: Indi

Population
  - Total: 631 (2016 census)
- Postcode: 3678

Oxley is a town in Victoria, Australia, located on Snow Road, 13 kilometres (8 mi) south-east of Wangaratta, in the Rural City of Wangaratta. At the 2016 census, Oxley had a population of 631.

Oxley derives its name from the Oxley Plains, which were named in 1824 by the explorers Hume and Hovell after John Oxley, the Surveyor-General of New South Wales. Oxley Post Office opened on 1 January 1870. An earlier office named Oxley became Milawa. The township served as the administrative centre of the Shire of Oxley until 1936.
