= Greta, Victoria =

Greta
- Town
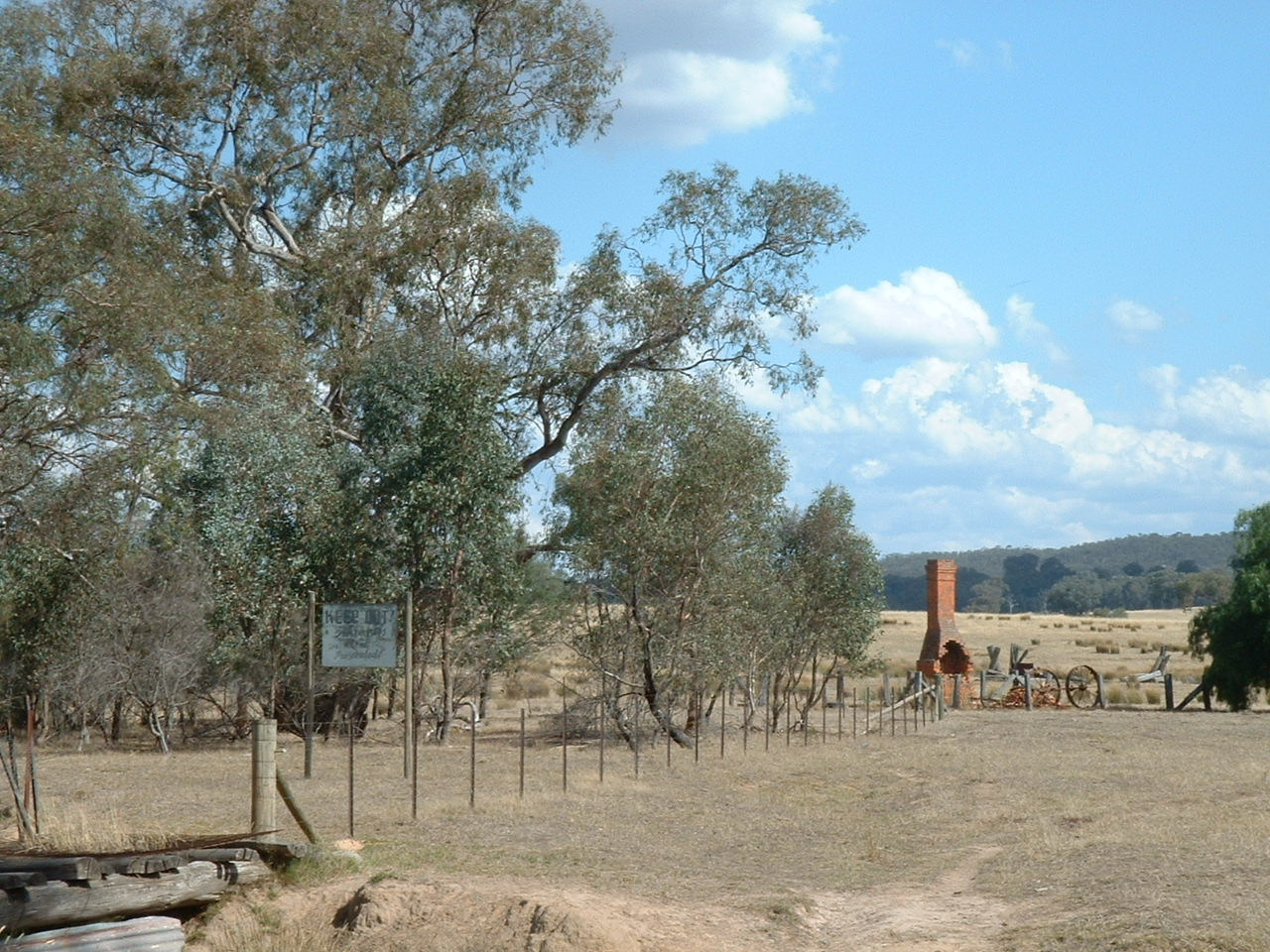
- The ruin of Ned Kelly's home at Greta

- Coordinates: 36°33′S 146°18′E
- Country: Australia
- State: Victoria
- Region: Hume
- LGA: Rural City of Wangaratta
- Location: 250 km (160 mi) NE of Melbourne; 23.3 km (14.5 mi) S of Wangaratta; 37.5 km (23.3 mi) E of Benalla; 14.3 km (8.9 mi) S of Glenrowan; 11 km (6.8 mi) W of Moyhu

Government
  - State electorate: Ovens Valley
  - Federal division: Indi

Population
  - Total: 107 (2016 census)
- Postcode: 3675

Greta is a district in Victoria, Australia, located east of Benalla, in the Rural City of Wangaratta. At the 2016 census, Greta had a population of 107 and Greta West had a population of 162.

== History ==
The district had four villages, all of which were called Greta at some stage. The original township known as Greta, located on Fifteen Mile Creek, is now called Greta West, and was once home to the family of bushranger Ned Kelly and Aaron Sherritt. The name is thought to be derived from Greta River in Cumberland, England.

Following the discovery of gold near Beechworth in 1852, roads to the diggings passed through the Greta area. At that time, the area contained the Greta Swamp, which was later drained. The town site was surveyed at Fifteen Mile Creek in 1852. During the 1860s the land was subdivided into farming lots, used for cereals, cattle grazing, and dairying. At this time the township developed and the Post Office opened on 4 September 1863 (closed in 1971, though offices at Greta West and Greta South remained open until 1994).

In 1867 a Catholic school was established. By the 1880s there were five schools in the Greta area; Greta, Greta South, Greta West, Hansonville, and Fifteen Mile Creek. Today, only two of the five schools remain; Greta Valley and Fifteen Mile School Camp.

The nearby town of Benalla was connected to the railway network in 1873, which reduced traffic through the Greta district, and it became principally a farming community.

A Methodist church was established in 1878 and an Anglican church in 1890. A public hall was built in 1916. Ned Kelly's relatives granted his last wish to be buried at his birthplace on 20 January 2013 in Greta Cemetery near his mother in consecrated ground. The burial followed a requiem mass held at St. Patrick's Catholic Church, Wangaratta on 18 January 2013.

The area known today as Glenrowan West was Greta back in Ned Kelly's day. Over time the post office moved further East and the town virtually relocated to the current boundaries. The Glenrowan-Moyhu Road is of significance; the dog leg to the left before the creek is the site of the old Greta Hotel (O'Brien's Victoria Hotel) the well is still visible. This is the site where Ned Kelly had a fight with Superintendent Hare. Also this was the main road to Sydney during the mid to late 19th Century. As the Greta township back then was built and surrounded by mainly swamp land the township moved to better pastures. The Greta Police Station was broken up in 1879 and a new station was opened at Glenrowan - Constable Anthony Alexander registered number 1649 was Gazetted to Glenrowan on 01/11/1879. Constable Robert Graham was one of the last policemen stationed at Greta and was well liked by the Kelly family amongst others. Today Greta, Greta West and Greta South remains a picturesque portion of the North East of Victoria where people live, visit and play amongst the creeks, rivers, bushland, mountains and grasslands just like the pioneers of yesteryear and years to come.

== Greta Football Club History ==
The town has an Australian Rules football team competing in the Ovens & King Football League. Prior to the Second World War Greta participated in a number of different competitions, including the King Valley Football Association, where a Greta South won a premiership in 1910, the Glenrowan-Thoona Football League, and the Fifteen Mile Creek Football Association. In the years leading to the outbreak of war, Greta was a member of the Benalla and District Football League, but when football resumed in 1945 it had joined the Ovens and King competition, in which it has competed since.

Greta quickly made its mark in the O & K F L, winning a premiership in only its second season. Coached by Fred O'Brien, it overcame Myrtleford by nine points in the 2nd semi final, and again in the grand final when straight kicking was the key to its success. Greta won that grand final by 27 points, 8.5 (53) to 2.14 (26), with O'Brien receiving coaching assistance from the great Laurie Nash, who was employed as coach of Ovens and Murray Football League club Wangaratta at the time.

Greta regularly contested the finals over the ensuing decade, but only once, in 1954, under the coaching of Ken Bodger, was it successful in claiming a premiership. The mid-1960s saw the Blues embark on their most sustained period of success to date, contesting five consecutive grand finals between 1964 and 1968, for flags in the middle three years. All three of these premiership sides were coached by former Moyhu player Maurie Farrell.

The early 1970s saw Greta continuing as a regular premiership threat without managing to break through, but then in 1976 the side failed to qualify for the finals for the first time in eighteen seasons. The 1980s started in the best way imaginable with the club's sixth OKFL premiership which came thanks to a solid 16.15 (111) to 13.6 (84) grand final defeat of a Whorouly side that had won the 2nd semi final encounter between the teams by a point.

Geoff Lacey, who would go on to win a Baker Medal in 1984, was in the first of an eventual three season stint as captain-coach, but he proved unable to build on the 1980 success. Indeed, although the Blues fielded some talented teams over the course of the remainder of the decade, it was to be 1993 before they again went top. Opposed in the grand final by archrival Chiltern, Greta was really only supposed to be there to make up the numbers, but ended up winning at a canter by 66 points, 19.13 (127) to 9.7 (61).

Further grand final appearances followed in 1995 (beat Beechworth by 20 points), 1997 (lost by 84 points to North Wangaratta), and 1999 (won by 5 points against Moyhu). In addition to its nine senior flags, Greta won four reserves premierships. In both 1965 and 1999 it achieved the 'double' of senior and reserves premierships in the same year.

Arguably the club's most famous playing product was Ian Montgomery, who played for Greta between 1960 and 1962, spent a season with Wangaratta in the OMFL, and went on to play with Collingwood in the Victorian Football League (VFL).

== Bibliography ==
- Wedd, Monty (2013). Ned Kelly, Narrated and Illustrated by Monty Wedd. Queensland, Australia: Comicoz. ISBN 978-0-9806535-1-9.

== See also ==
- Greta Bunyip
- Local History of Greta
- A History of Greta North-Eastern Historical Society (1972) ISBN 0-909706-24-7
