= City of Wangaratta =

Coordinates: 36°22′S 146°19′E

City of Wangaratta Victoria
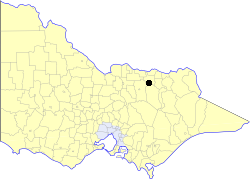
- Location in Victoria
- The City of Wangaratta as at its dissolution in 1994
- Population: 16,200 (1992)
  - Density: 634.5/km^{2} (1,643/sq mi)
- Established: 1863
- Area: 25.53 km^{2} (9.9 sq mi)
- Council seat: Wangaratta
- Region: Hume
- County: Bogong, Moira
LGAs around City of Wangaratta:
	Wangaratta (S)
Wangaratta (S)	City of Wangaratta	Wangaratta (S)
Benalla	Oxley	Oxley

The City of Wangaratta was a local government area located about 260 kilometres (162 mi) northeast of Melbourne, the state capital of Victoria, Australia. The city covered an area of 25.53 square kilometres (9.9 sq mi), and existed from 1863 until 1994. It was responsible for the urban area of Wangaratta.

== History ==
Wangaratta was first incorporated as a borough on 19 June 1863, only nine days after the surrounding North Ovens Road District was proclaimed. On 15 April 1959, Wangaratta was proclaimed a city. It absorbed sections to its south on 31 May 1968 and 10 March 1976, and to its north on 1 October 1979, from the Shire of Wangaratta.

On 18 November 1994, the City of Wangaratta was abolished, and along with the Shires of Oxley, Wangaratta and various surrounding districts, was merged into the newly created Rural City of Wangaratta.

=== Wards ===
The city was not divided into wards, and its eight councillors represented the entire city.

== Suburbs ==
- Laceby (shared with the Shire of Oxley)
- North Wangaratta (shared with the Shire of Wangaratta)
- Waldara
- Wangaratta*
- Wangaratta South

* Council seat.

== Population ==
Year	Population
1954	10,715
1958	12,210*
1961	13,784
1966	15,167
1971	15,633
1976	16,157
1981	16,202
1986	16,598
1991	15,984

* Estimate in the 1958 Victorian Year Book.
