= King River (Victoria) =

River in Victoria (Australia)

King
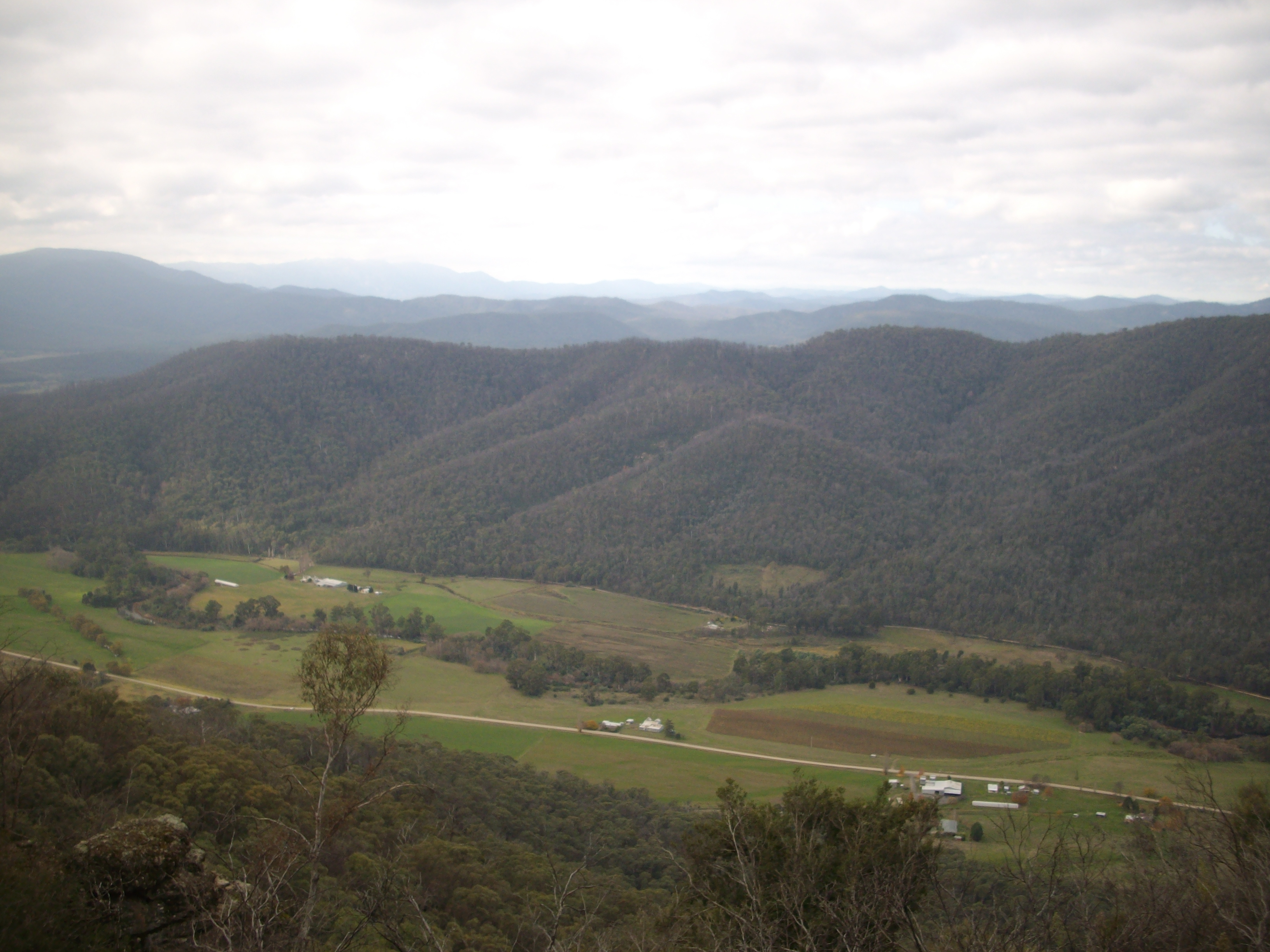
- The King River, above the King Valley, in 2008

- Location of the King River mouth in Victoria
- Etymology: Philip Gidley King, 3rd Governor of NSW
- Native name: Poodumbeyer (Pallanganmiddang)

Location
- Country: Australia
- State: Victoria
- Region: Victorian Alps (IBRA), Victorian Alps, Hume
- Local government areas: Mansfield Shire, Wangaratta
- Town: Moyhu, Wangaratta

Physical characteristics
- Source: Alpine National Park, Victorian Alps
  - location: below Mount Buggery
  - coordinates: 37°9′1″S 146°36′56″E
  - elevation: 1,030 m (3,380 ft)
- Mouth: confluence with the Ovens River
  - location: Wangaratta
  - coordinates: 36°21′16″S 146°19′50″E
  - elevation: 142 m (466 ft)
- Length: 126 km (78 mi)

Basin features
- River system: North-East Murray catchment, Murray-Darling basin
- Tributaries
  - left: Fork Creek, Tomahawk Creek, Evans Creek (King River, Victoria), Boggy Creek (Victoria)
  - right: Stony Creek (King River, Victoria), Black Range Creek, Meadow Creek (Victoria), Hurdle Creek
- National park: Alpine National Park, Mount Buffalo National Park

The King River, a perennial river of the North-East Murray catchment of the Murray-Darling basin, is located in the Alpine and Hume regions of Victoria, Australia. It flows from the northwestern slopes of the Alpine National Park in the Australian Alps, through the King Valley, and joining with the Ovens River at the rural city of Wangaratta.

== Location and features ==
The King River rises below Mount Buggery, within Mansfield Shire, at an elevation exceeding 1,460 metres (4,790 ft) above sea level. The river flows generally north by northwest, most of its course through remote parts of the Alpine and Mount Buffalo national parks, and then descending into the King Valley, joined by eight minor tributaries, before reaching its confluence with the Ovens River at Wangaratta. The river descends 1,320 metres (4,330 ft) over its 126-kilometre (78 mi) course.

The river is impounded by the William Hovell Dam to form Lake William Hovell, that provides water for approximately 24 square kilometres (9.3 sq mi) for irrigated crops, vineyards and grazing properties along the King River from Cheshunt to Wangaratta. A small 1.6-megawatt (2,100 hp) hydro-electric generator is driven by the river's outflow from the dam, with an average annual output of 3.7 gigawatt-hours (13 TJ).

== Etymology ==
The river was given its English name by Hamilton Hume and William Hovell, explorers of the region, in honour of Captain Philip Gidley King, the third Governor of New South Wales, in office from 1800 to 1806.

In the Aboriginal Waywurru language, the river is named Poodumbeyer, with no defined meaning.

== Recreation ==
Kayaking enthusiasts access the river for the many level 2 and level 3 rapids. In 2008 the site for the Victorian and Australian Downriver Championships.

== See also ==
- List of rivers of Australia § Victoria
