= Eldorado, Victoria =

Eldorado
- Town
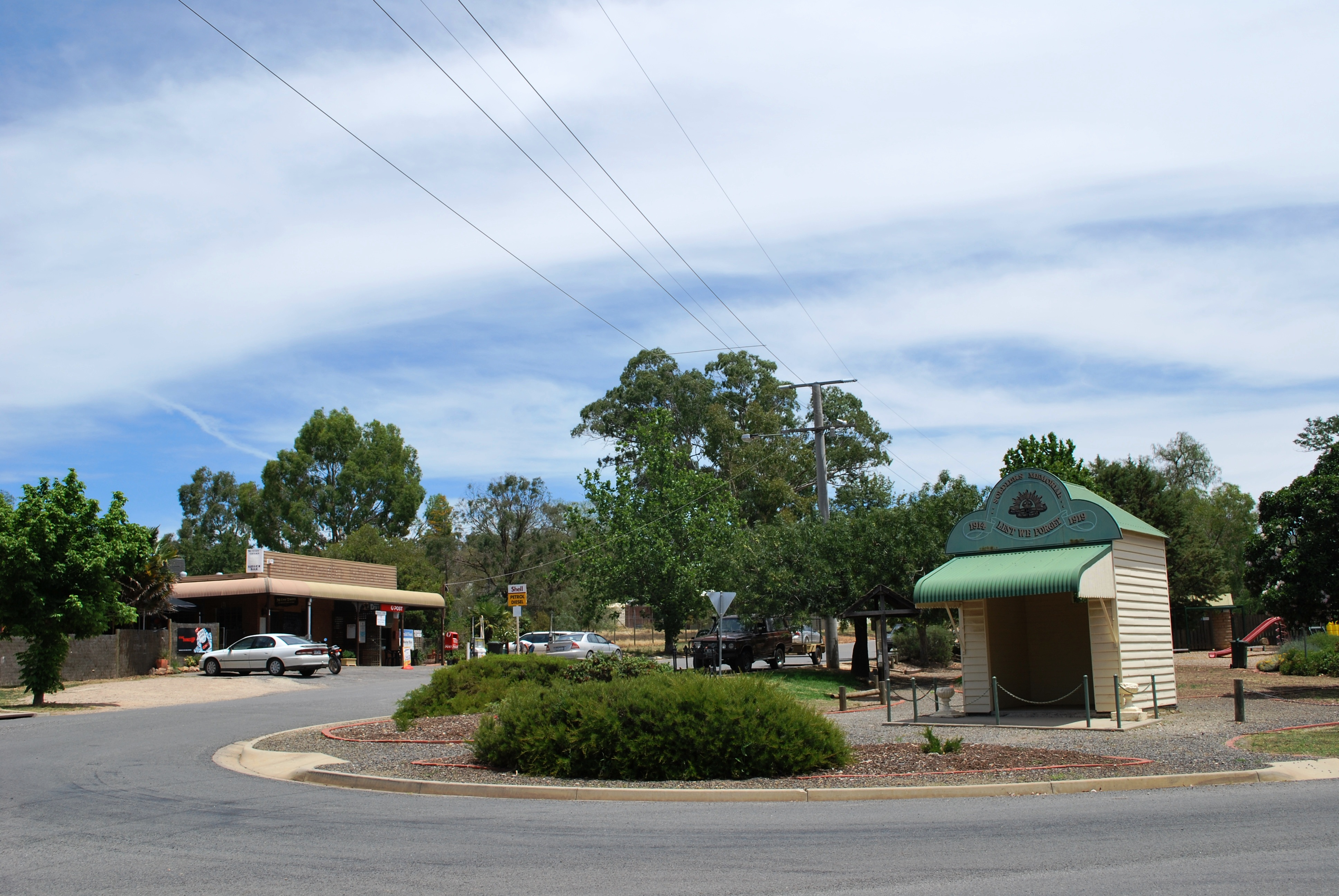
- The main street of Eldorado. A Soldiers Memorial bus shelter is in the foreground while the General store and McEvoy Tavern ("The smallest pub in Victoria") can be seen to the left.

- Interactive map of Eldorado
- Coordinates: 36°18′0″S 146°31′0″E
- Country: Australia
- State: Victoria
- Region: Hume
- LGA: Rural City of Wangaratta

Population
  - Total: 264 (2016 census)
- Postcode: 3746

Eldorado, or El Dorado, is a small town in the Rural City of Wangaratta, Victoria, Australia. At the 2016 census, Eldorado had a population of 264, down from a population of 287 at the time of the 2006 census.

== History ==
Eldorado was named after the legend of El Dorado in 1840 by William Baker, the name he used for his run. Even though the name refers to a land abounding in gold there was no gold found in Eldorado until the 1850s when it became a thriving gold rush town. Eldorado Post Office opened on 1 August 1861.

The town's population declined sharply after the area ceased to yield gold.

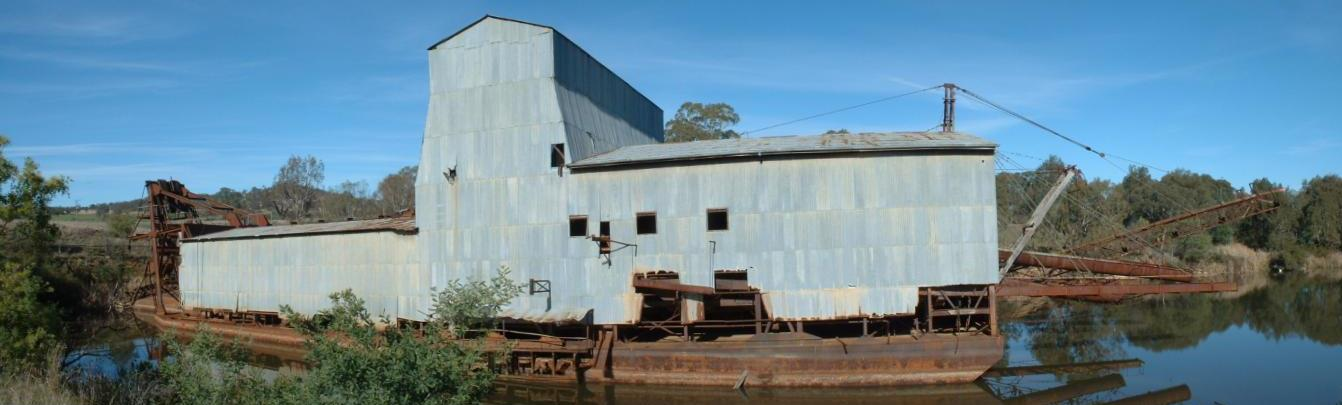
Panoramic view of the gold dredge at Eldorado, Victoria.

The remains of an old gold dredge can still be seen today. This is a large steel dredge which was designed and built by Thompson's Engineering for the Cocks Eldorado Gold Dredging Company in 1935–36. By the time it was decommissioned it had dredged 30 million cubic metres from the river flats of the Eldorado Plain. It has 110 digging buckets, each of which was capable of digging and lifting 0.3 cubic metres of soil. It is the most intact surviving and largest bucket dredge in Australia.

The dredge received an Engineering Heritage National Marker from Engineers Australia as part of its Engineering Heritage Recognition Program.

== Sport ==
The town is currently home to the Wolfpack RLFC, a rugby league club who compete in the Goulburn Murray Rugby League competition. The side won their first premiership in 2023, and play at the Eldorado Recreation Reserve.

Eldorado was home to an Australian Rules football team that competed in the Ovens & Murray Football League in 1893, then from 1925 to 1954 the club competed in the Ovens & King Football League.

== Gallery ==
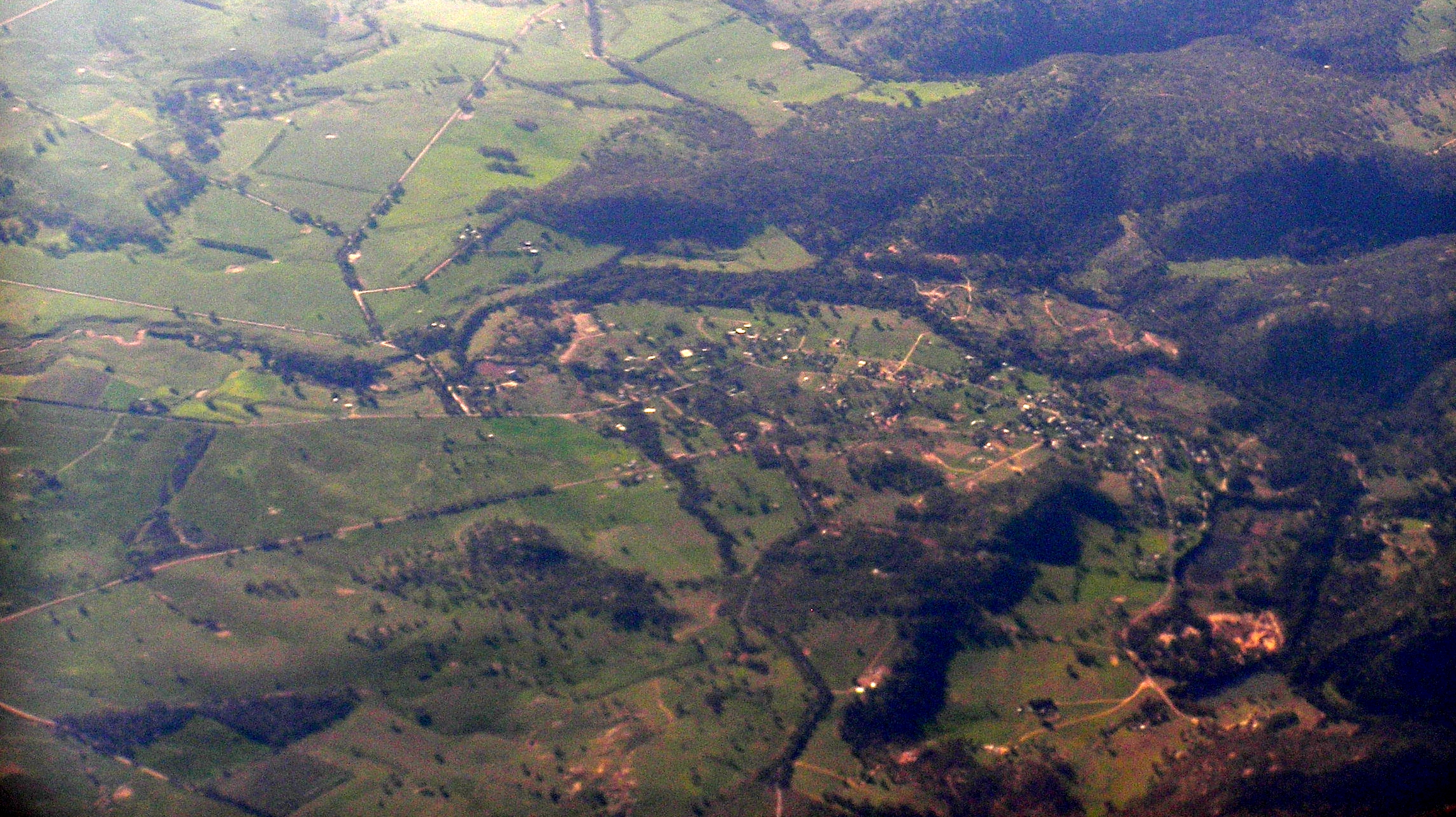
Aerial photo from south east

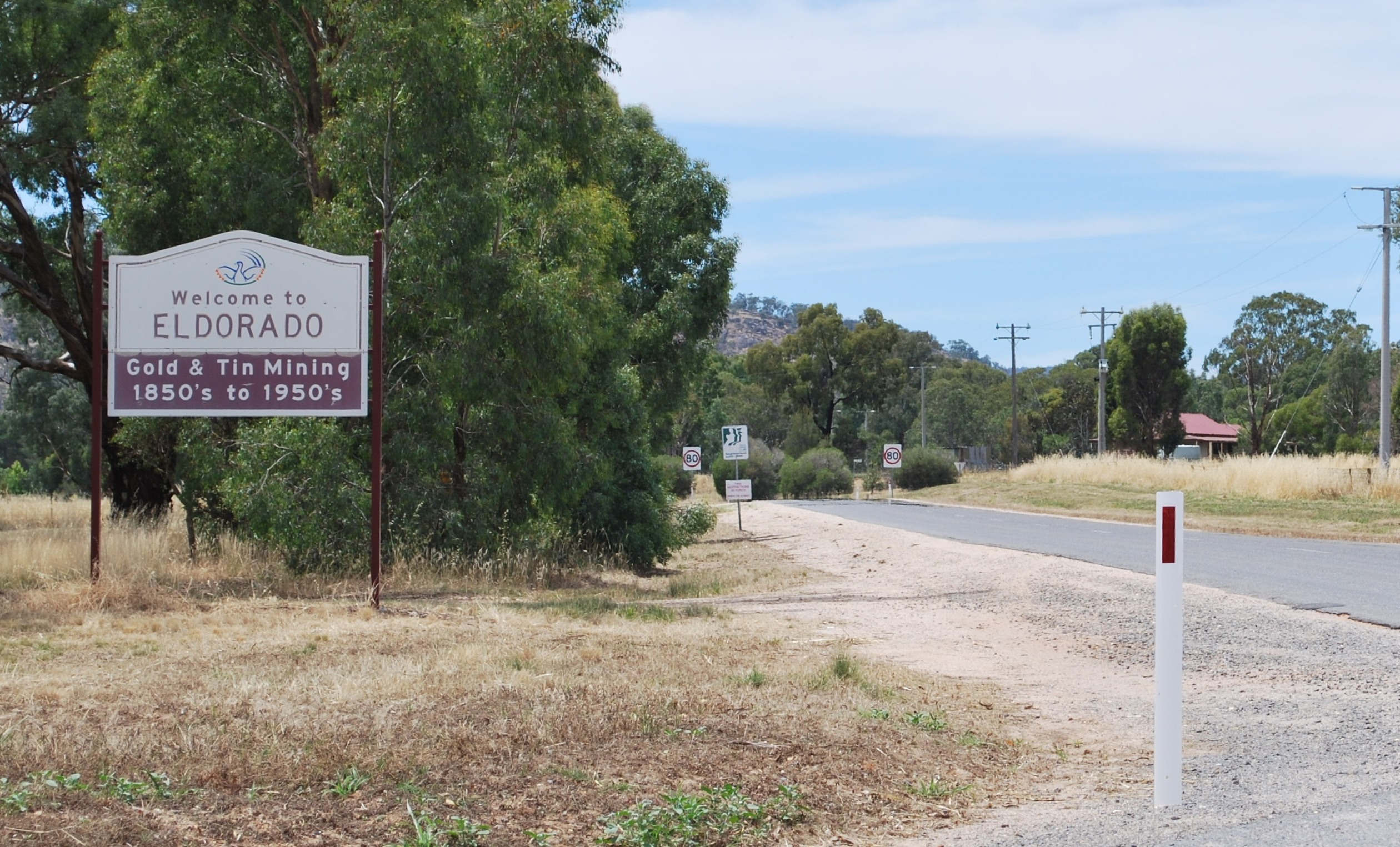
Entering Eldorado

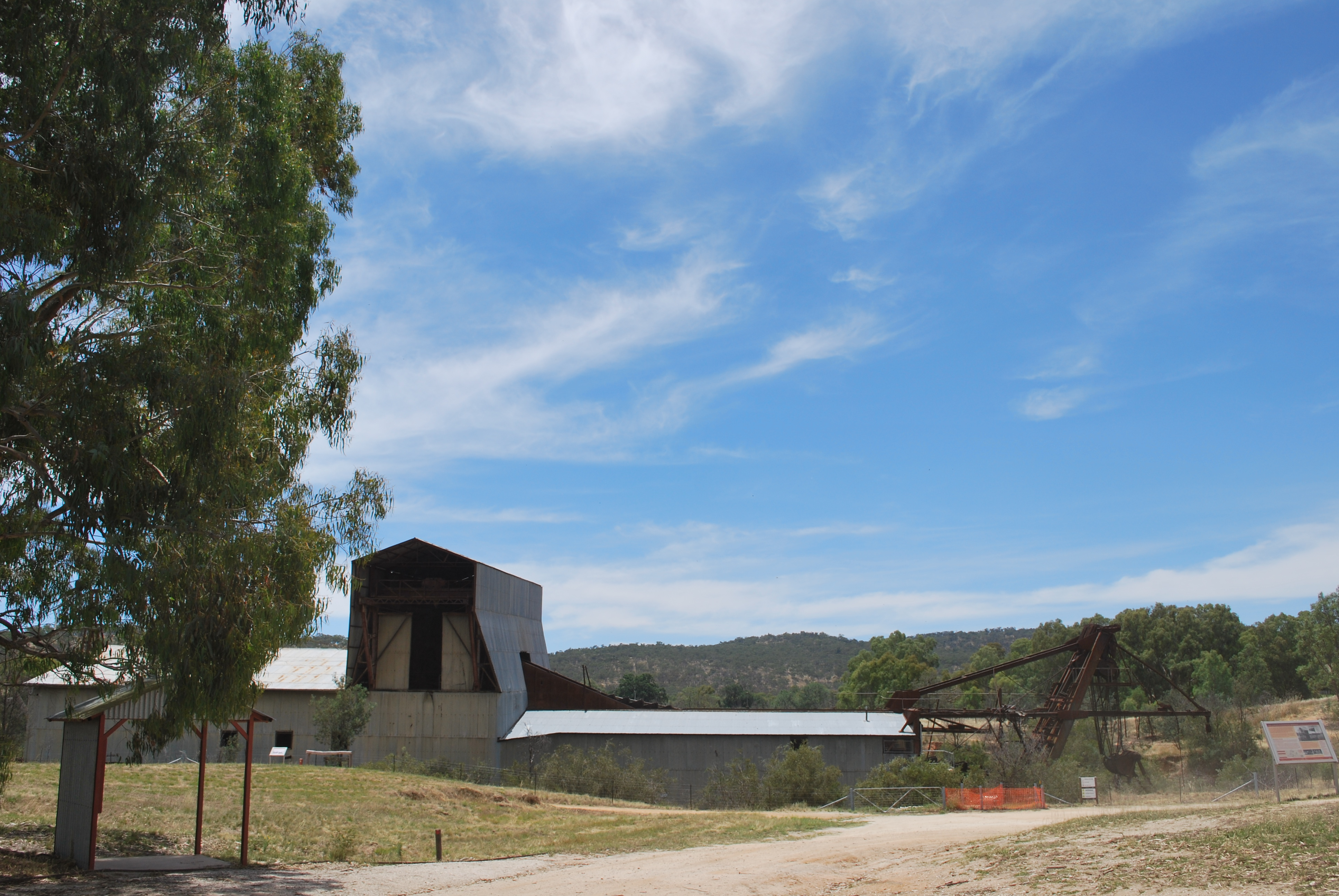
Gold dredge

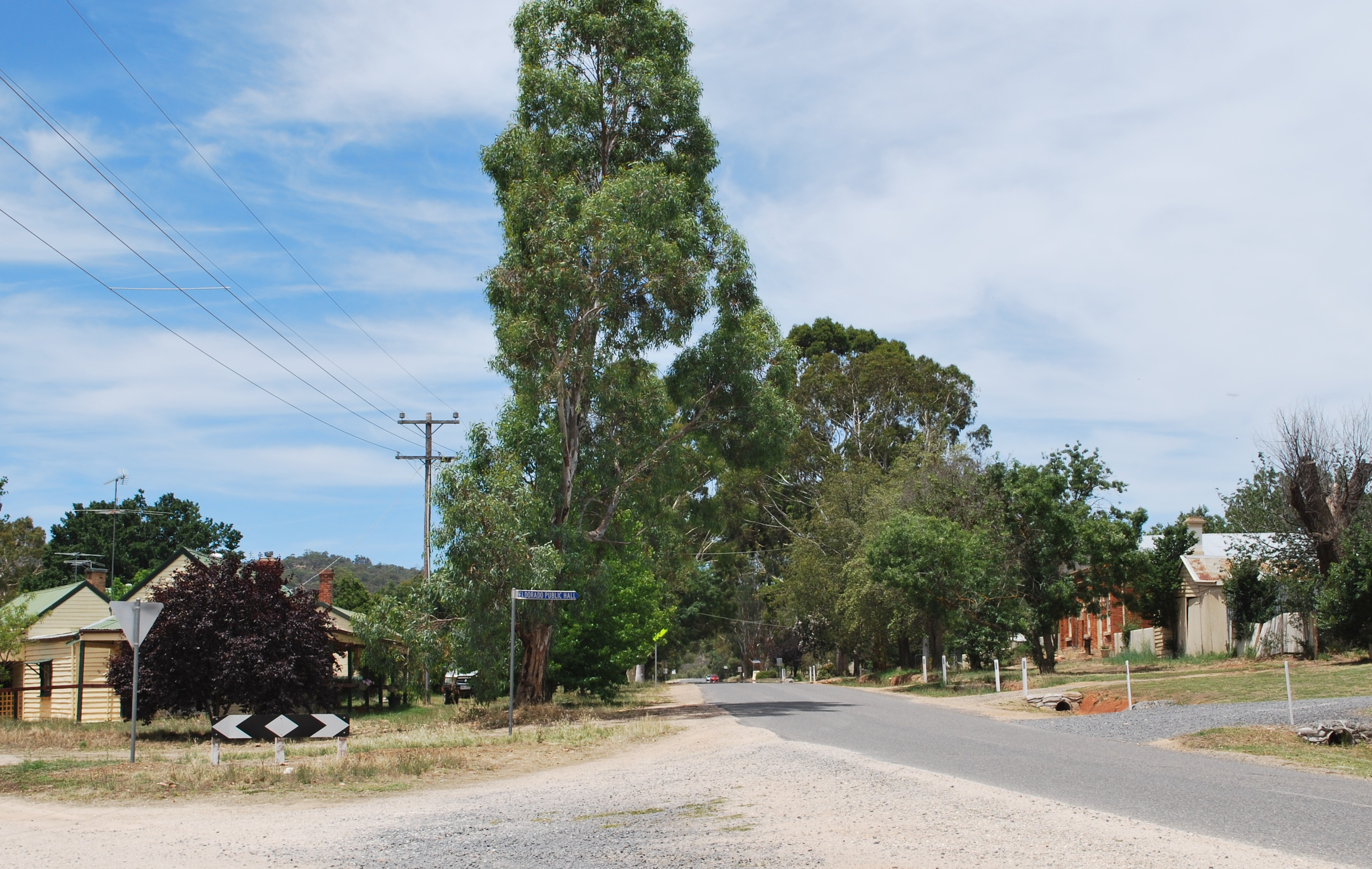
A residential street

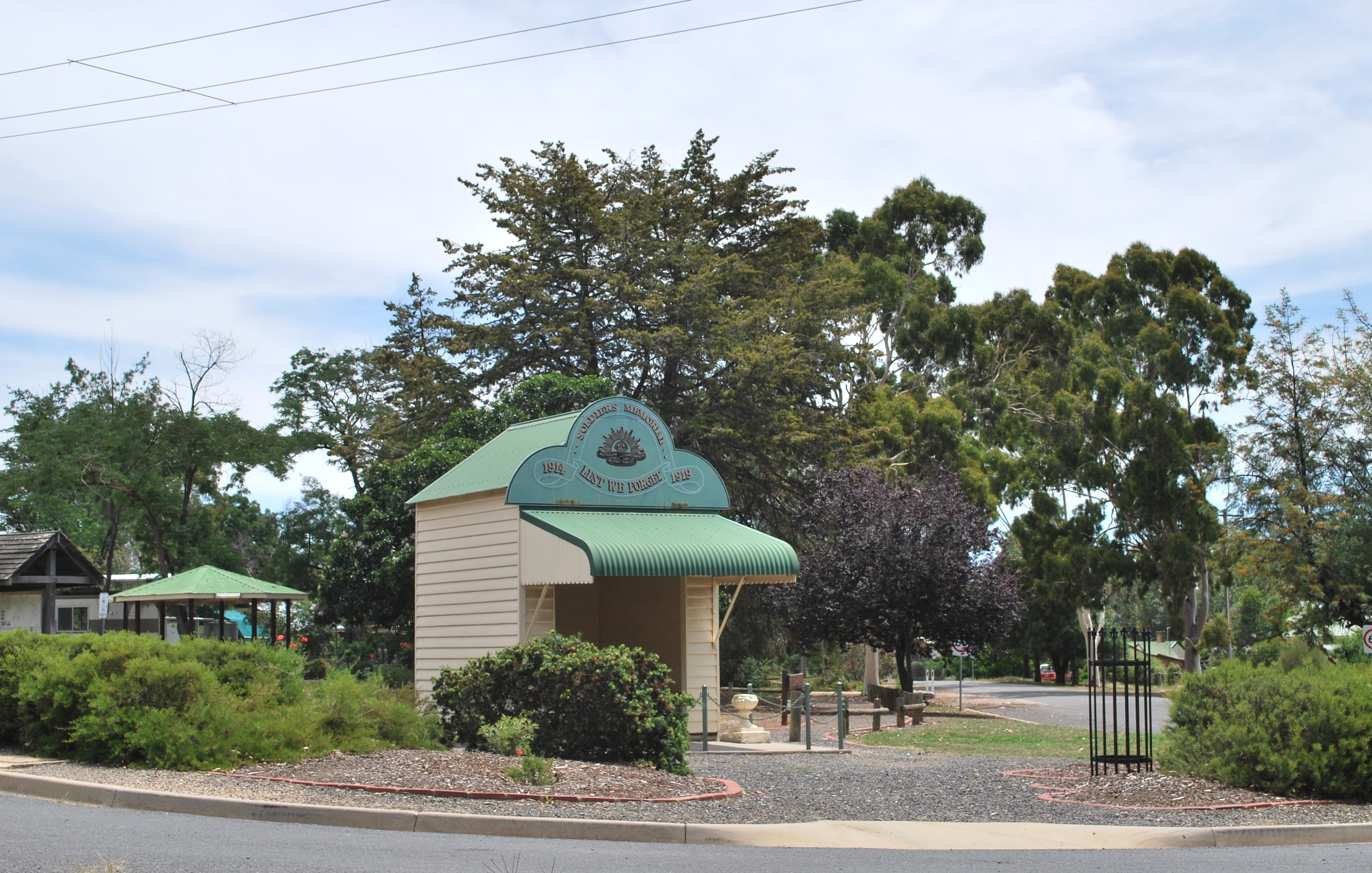
Memorial bus shelter

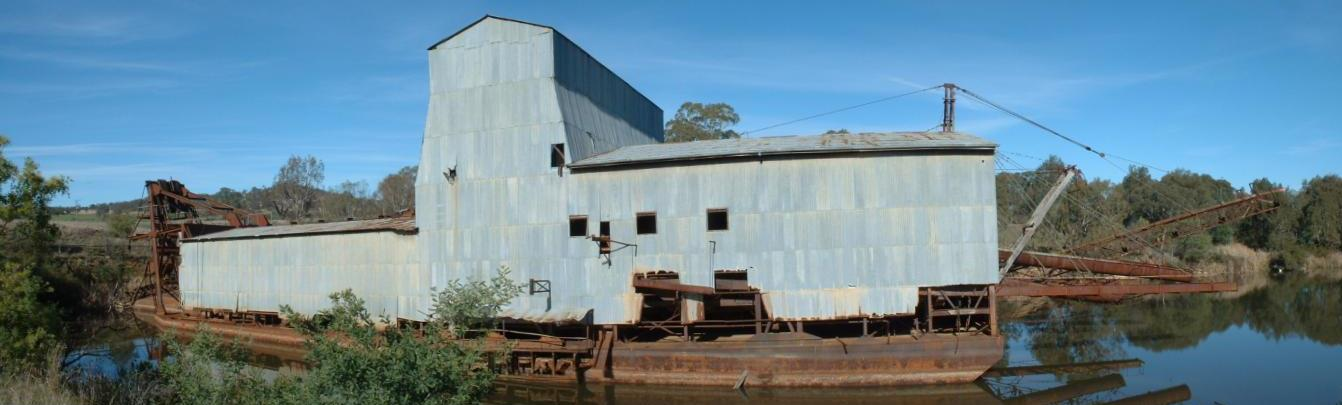
Gold dredge

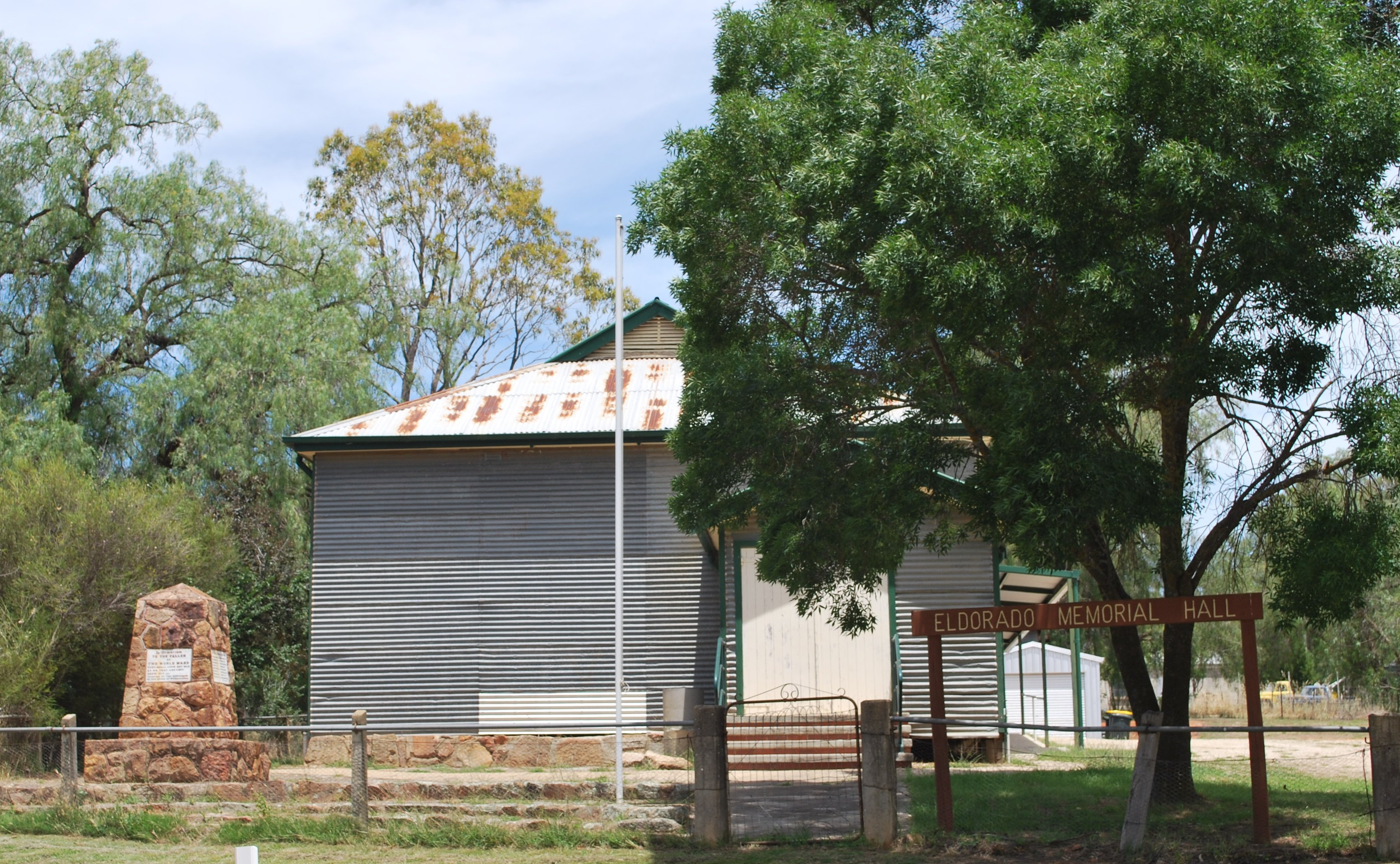
Memorial hall and monument
