= Everton, Victoria =

Everton
- Town
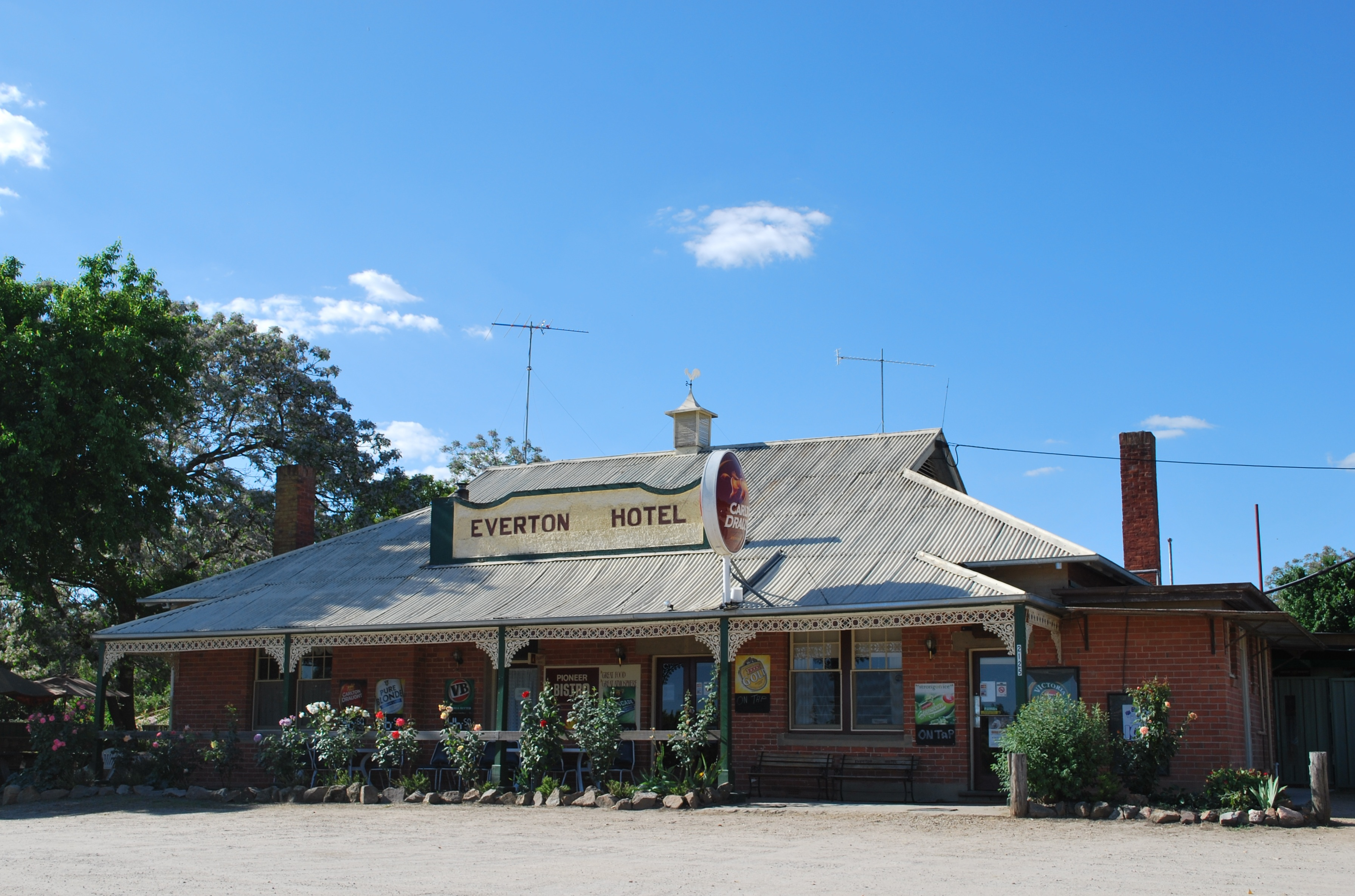
- Everton Hotel

- Interactive map of Everton
- Coordinates: 36°25′0″S 146°32′0″E
- Country: Australia
- State: Victoria
- Region: Hume
- LGA: Rural City of Wangaratta
- Location: 272 km (169 mi) NE of Melbourne; 25 km (16 mi) E of Wangaratta; 27 km (17 mi) NW of Myrtleford

Government
  - State electorate: Ovens Valley
  - Federal division: Indi

Population
  - Total: 203 (2016 census)
- Postcode: 3678

Everton is a small town located 20 kilometres (12 mi) from Wangaratta in northeast Victoria, along the Great Alpine Road. At the 2016 census, Everton and the surrounding area had a population of 203.

Attractions of the town and area include the Murray to the Mountains Rail Trail (a sealed off-road bicycle path offering 95 kilometres (59 mi) of cycling along former railway tracks), wineries, and the Victorian High Country.

Everton Post Office opened in 1876 and closed in 1965. An earlier Everton office opened on 8 May 1873, was renamed Everton Station in 1876, Everton Rail around 1909, Everton Upper in 1922 and also closed in 1965.
