= Docker, Victoria =

Docker
- Town
- Coordinates: 36°31′S 146°23′E
- Country: Australia
- State: Victoria
- Region: Hume
- LGA: Rural City of Wangaratta

Government
  - State electorate: Electoral district of Ovens Valley District
  - Federal division: Division of Wangaratta Rural City Council

Population
  - Total: 120 (2016)
- Postcode: 3678

Docker is a town in Victoria, Australia. It is located on Wangaratta-Whitfield Road along the King River. At the 2016 census, Docker recorded a population of 120.

== History ==
In 1838, the Docker family settled in nearby Bontharambo Plains. It is likely the town of Docker is named after this family.

== Traditional ownership ==
The formally recognised traditional owners for the northern area in which Docker sits are the Yorta Yorta people, who are represented by the Yorta Yorta Nation Aboriginal Corporation.

The formally recognised traditional owners for the southern area in which Docker sits are the Taungurung people. The Taungurung People are represented by the Taungurung Land and waters Council Aboriginal Corporation.

== Demographics ==
As of the 2016 Australian census, 120 people resided in Docker. The median age of persons in Docker was 46 years. There were more males than females, with 51.3% of the population male and 48.7% female. The average household size was 2.7 people per household.

78.4% of people in Docker were born in Australia. Nobody in Docker identified themselves as being Aboriginal and/or Torres Strait Islander people in the 2016 census. The most common ancestries in Docker were English 31.6%, Australian 27.1%, Scottish 11.6%, Irish 11.0% and Italian 7.1%.

== Industry ==
The industry that employs the most people in Docker is the beef cattle farming industry (13.0% of people employed aged over 15 years are in this industry), followed by dairy cattle farming (10.9%).
