= Rural City of Wangaratta =

Coordinates: 36°21′21″S 146°19′33″E

- Local government area
- Location in Victoria

- Interactive map of Rural City of Wangaratta
- Country: Australia
- State: Victoria
- Region: Hume
- Established: 1994
- Council seat: Wangaratta

Government
  - Mayor: Irene Grant
  - State electorate: Ovens Valley
  - Federal division: Indi

Area
  - Total: 3,645 km^{2} (1,407 sq mi)

Population
  - Total: 29,808 (2021 census)
  - Density: 8.1778/km^{2} (21.180/sq mi)
- Gazetted: 18 November 1994
- Website: Rural City of Wangaratta
LGAs around Rural City of Wangaratta
Moira	Indigo	Indigo
Benalla	Rural City of Wangaratta	Alpine
Mansfield	Mansfield	Wellington

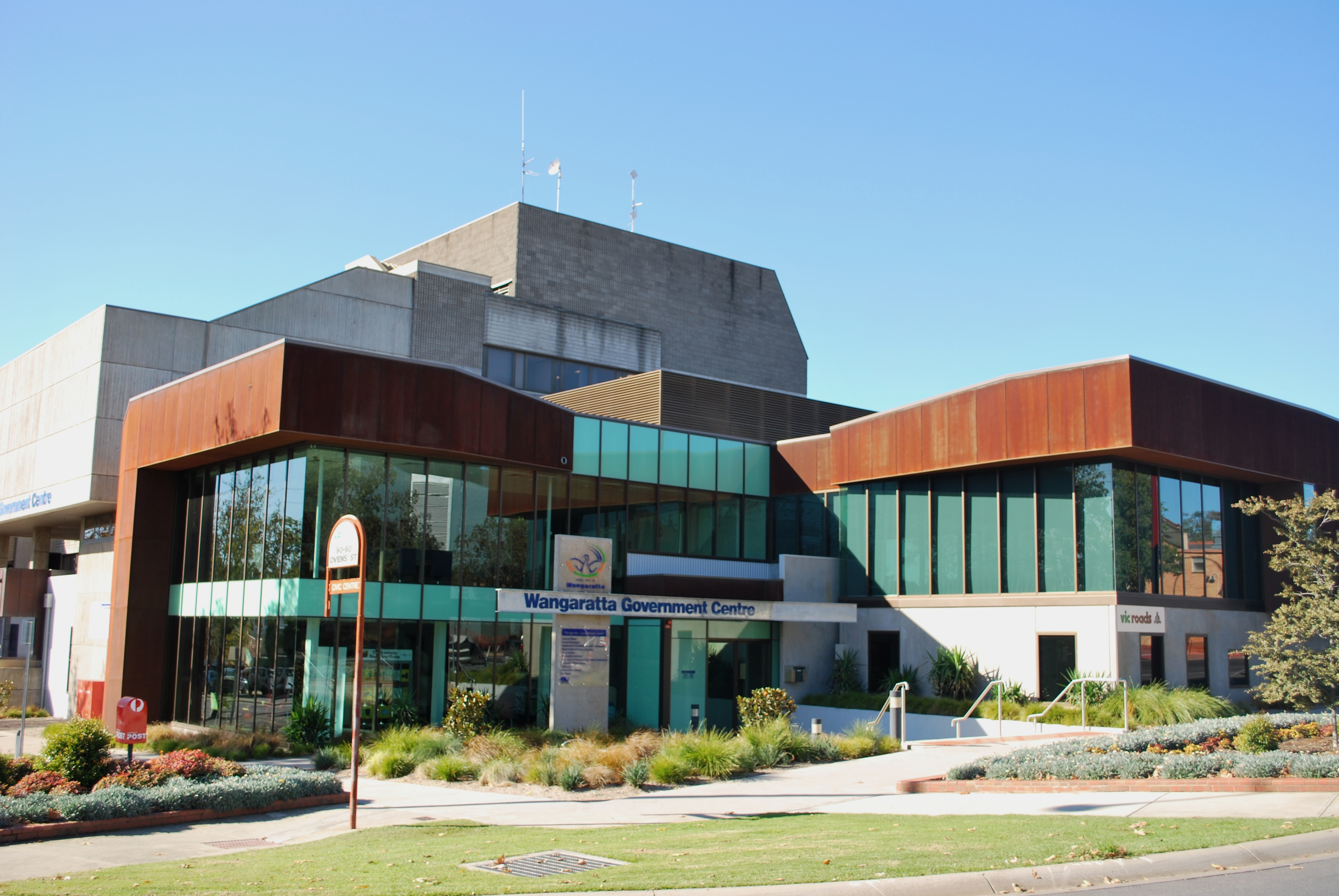
Council Offices and chambers

The Rural City of Wangaratta is a local government area in the Hume region of Victoria, Australia, located in the north-east part of the state. It covers an area of 3,645 square kilometres (1,407 mi^{2}) and, in August 2021, had a population of 29,808. It includes the towns of Cheshunt, Eldorado, Everton, Glenrowan, Greta, Greta West, Milawa, Moyhu, Oxley, Tarrawingee, Wangaratta and Whitfield. When formed the municipality was originally called the Shire of Milawa, but a few months later, was renamed to its current name.

The Rural City is governed and administered by the Wangaratta Rural City Council; its seat of local government and administrative centre is located at the council headquarters in Wangaratta. The Rural City is named after the main urban settlement located in the north of the LGA, that is Wangaratta, which is also the LGA's most populous urban centre with a population of around 18,500.

== History ==
The Rural City of Wangaratta was formed in 1994 from the amalgamation of the City of Wangaratta, the Shire of Wangaratta, the Shire of Oxley (less the Merriang district and the Buffalo River valley), the Glenrowan district of the Shire of Benalla, the Everton and Murmungee districts of the United Shire of Beechworth, and the township of Peechelba from the Shire of Yarrawonga.

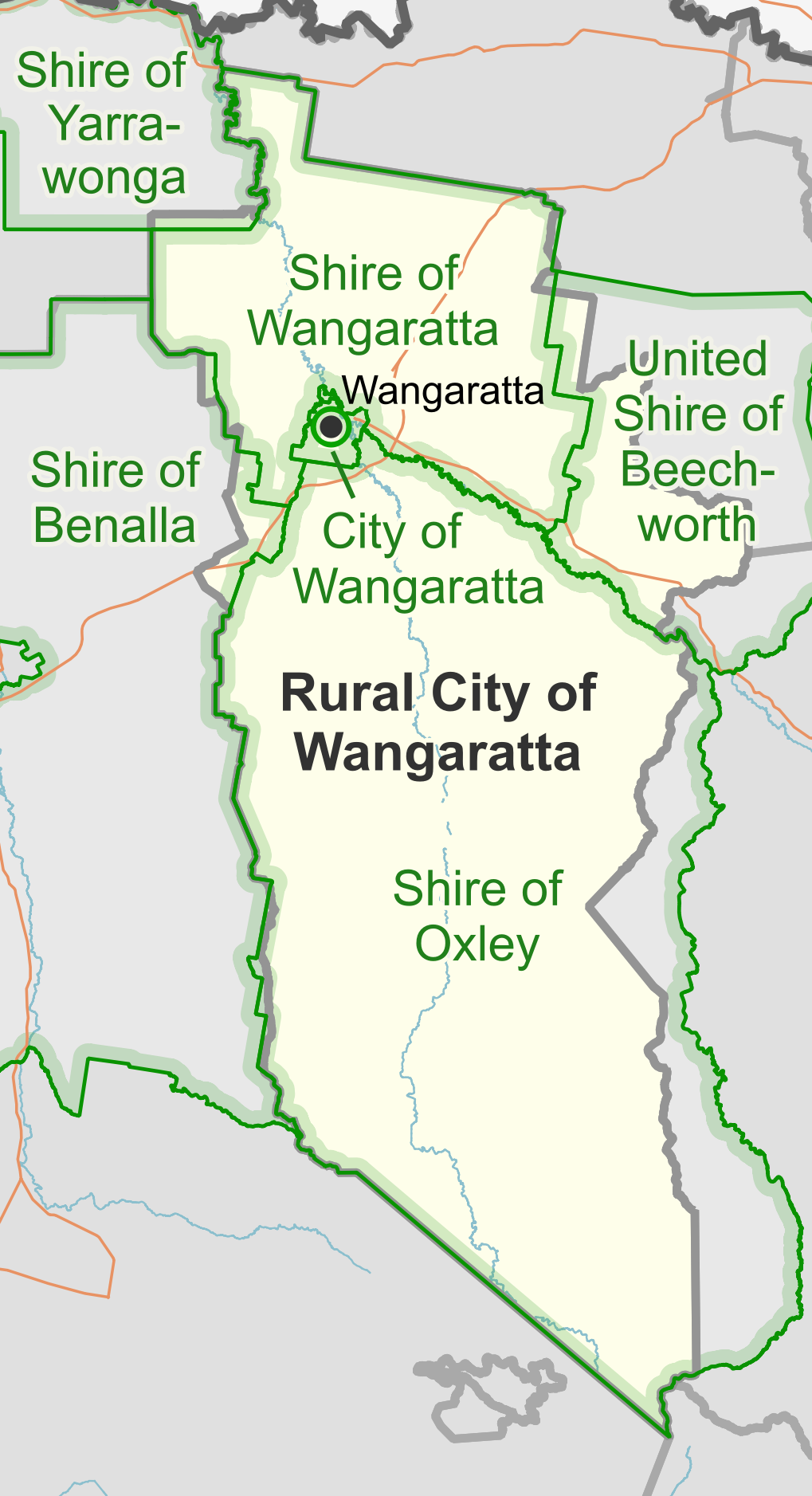
The Rural City's predecessor LGAs (green) as they were in 1994.

== Council ==
2024 ward boundaries. Expand the map and click on a ward to see the ward name.

=== Current composition ===
The council is composed of seven single-councillor wards. As of the 2024 election, the seven councillors are:

Ward	Councillor	Notes
Appin	Tania Maxwell	
Bullawah	Dave Fuller	
King River	Harry Bussell	
Ovens	Harvey Benton	Deputy Mayor
Warby	Irene Grant	Mayor
Wareena	Ashlee Fitzpatrick	
Yarrunga	Allison Winters	

==== History ====
The election of Councillors in 2016 followed a three year period where the Council was governed by Administrators. Administrators had been appointed by an Act of Parliament, following the dismissal of the Councillors elected at the 2012 general election. A panel of three administrators, by an Act of Parliament, was appointed to oversee the council until the 2016 municipal elections.

In 2023, the Victoria Electoral Commission commenced an electoral structure review into the existing Ward structures of the Rural City of Wangaratta to satisfy the requirements of the Local Government Act 2020 (Vic). As a result of this review, the council moved to seven single-councillor wards for the 2024 election. Previously, the council was divided into 4 wards, including a four-councillor city ward.

=== Administration and governance ===
The councillors meet in the council chambers at the council headquarters in the Wangaratta Government Centre, which is also the location of the council's administrative activities. It also provides customer services at its administrative centre in Wangaratta.

== Townships and localities ==
In the 2021 census, the rural city had a population of 29,808, up from 28,310 in the 2016 census.

Population
Locality	2016	2021
Bobinawarrah	83	100
Boorhaman	129	135
Boorhaman East	17	13
Boorhaman North	49	53
Boralma	69	79
Boweya^	41	51
Bowmans Forest	96	106
Bowser	47	44
Byawatha	155	160
Carboor	95	97
Cheshunt	231	213
Cheshunt South	0	0
Docker	120	106
Dockers Plains	54	59
East Wangaratta	80	66
Edi	75	60
Edi Upper	92	109
Eldorado	385	382
Everton	203	193
Everton Upper	158	154
Glenrowan^	963	1,049
Greta	107	86
Greta South	132	131
Greta West	162	157
Hansonville	139	155
Killawarra	418	391
King Valley	101	87
Laceby	247	304
Londrigan	127	159
Markwood	258	230
Meadow Creek	84	112
Milawa	587	588
Moyhu	445	437
Murmungee	57	69
Myrrhee	152	168
North Wangaratta	288	282
Oxley	631	710
Oxley Flats	55	49
Peechelba^	184	177
Peechelba East	45	54
Rose River	26	26
Springhurst	348	349
Tarrawingee	370	416
Tolmie^	447	547
Wabonga	0	0
Waldara	618	677
Wangandary	227	217
Wangaratta	18,102	19,214
Wangaratta South	509	550
Whitfield	215	220
Whitlands	35	37
Whorouly	376	383
Whorouly East	82	92
Whorouly South	51	64

^ - Territory divided with another LGA

== See also ==
- List of localities (Victoria)
- List of places on the Victorian Heritage Register in the Rural City of Wangaratta
