= Milawa =

- Town
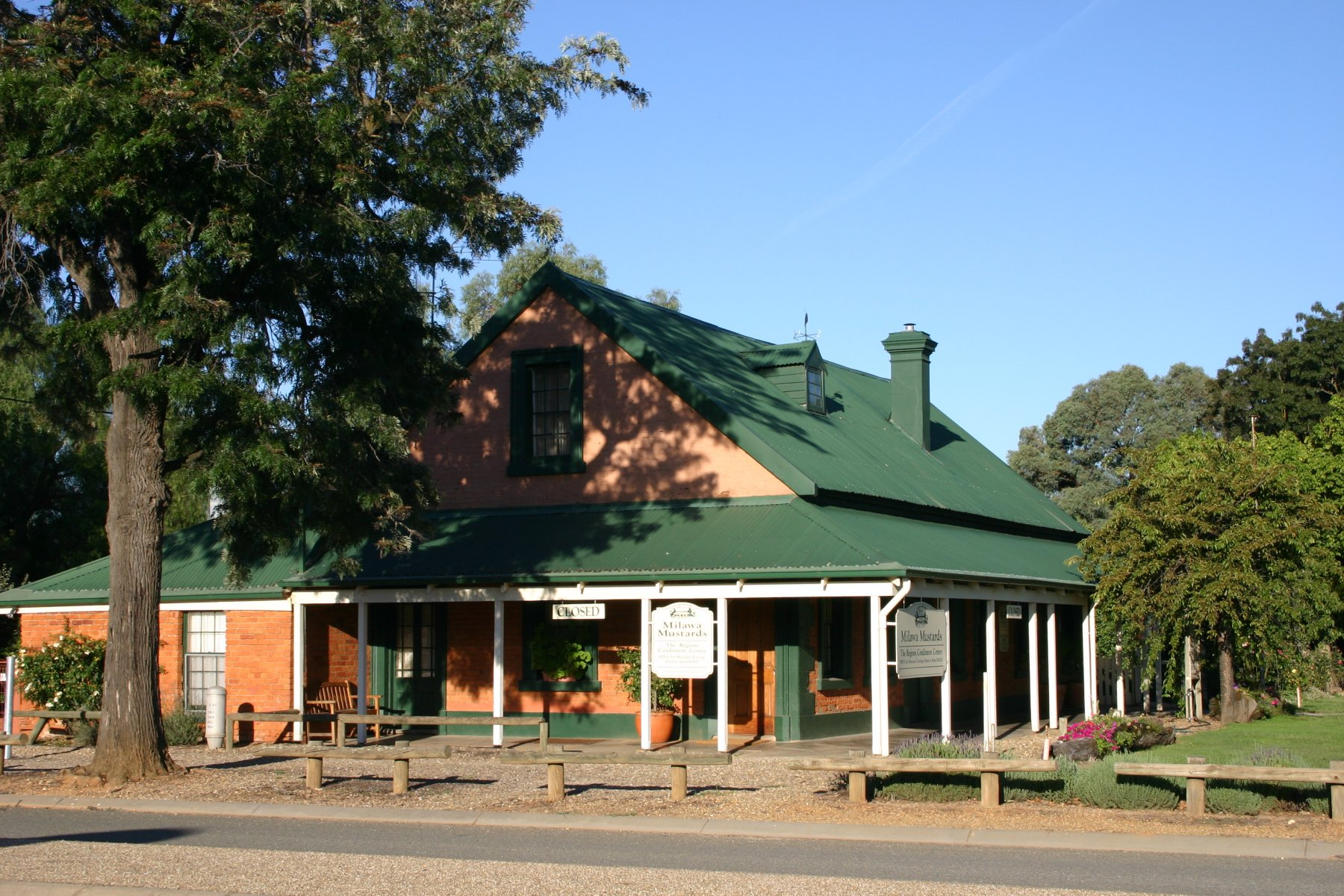
- Milawa Mustards cottage

- Interactive map of Milawa
- Coordinates: 36°26′S 146°26′E
- Country: Australia
- State: Victoria
- Region: Hume
- LGA: Rural City of Wangaratta
- Location: 256 km (159 mi) NE of Melbourne; 16.1 km (10.0 mi) SE of Wangaratta

Government
  - State electorate: Ovens Valley
  - Federal division: Indi

Population
  - Total: 588 (2021 census)
- Postcode: 3678

Milawa is a town in Victoria, Australia, located on Snow Road, 18 kilometres (11 mi) south-east of Wangaratta, in the Rural City of Wangaratta. At the 2021 census, Milawa had a population of 588. It is at the northern end of the King Valley wine region, between the King River to the west and Ovens River to the north (they meet in Wangaratta).

Milawa is the hub of the Milawa Gourmet Region which offers a wide range of produce.

== History ==
Milawa was named in 1873 after being known only as The Square for many years prior. The word Milawa is aboriginal in origin. The word is made up of the words 'Mila' meaning 'Eyes' and 'Wah/Wa' meaning water. The Bpangerang people in the Milawa area were the water watchers who kept a close eye on the two main rivers, the King River (the Poodumbia) and the Ovens (the Torryong).

In these early times the Emu Hotel occupied one corner (built by James Henley) and the Commercial was on the opposite corner (built by Colin Gardner). General merchandise was available at McKenzie's store and there were two blacksmiths, a saddler, a bootmaker, a carpenter and a doctor, Dr McSweeney. (Henley’s Wine Bar & Kitchen now occupies the Emu Hotel site, the Milawa Hotel occupies the Commercial Hotel site and Food on Wood the McKenzies site). The Post Office opened on 7 July 1862, known as Oxley until 1870 and Oxley Plains until 1874.

A Mechanics Institute comprising a free library and a spacious hall opened in 1889. A court was established in Milawa in 1874 by the visiting Magistrate Mr Howitt, in a room leased from the Emu Hotel. The police station was located at the Commercial Hotel and in 1917 moved to McKenzies store upon becoming vacant. The lock-up adjoined the Emu Hotel.

A dairy company was established in 1891 and by 1896 was one of the biggest dairy companies in Australia (Milawa Cheese Company now occupies this site)

Football and cricket began to be played on an organised basis in the 1890s.

Milawa was connected to electricity from the Kiewa Hydroelectric Scheme in 1939.

A violent storm cut a narrow path through Milawa in 1977 and destroyed the Anglican church, tore the roofs from many buildings and destroyed crops. A second storm in 2000 followed a very similar path with similar results.

Source: Memories of Oxley, Graham Jones (1995).

== Attractions ==
- Brown Brothers has been established in Milawa since 1889 and is well known for its wide range of wines exported to many countries.

== Sport ==
- The town has an Australian Rules football team competing in the Ovens & King Football League.
- Squash: There are three squash courts at Milawa and a number of competitions running throughout the year.
- Tennis
- Netball
