= Cheshunt, Victoria =

Cheshunt
- Town
- Interactive map of Cheshunt
- Coordinates: 36°48′S 146°26′E
- Country: Australia
- State: Victoria
- Region: Hume
- LGA: Rural City of Wangaratta
- Location: 231 km (144 mi) NW of Melbourne; 59 km (37 mi) S of Wangaratta; 31 km (19 mi) S of Moyhu

Government
  - State electorate: Ovens Valley
  - Federal division: Indi

Population
  - Total: 213 (SAL 2021)
- Postcode: 3678

Cheshunt is a locality situated in the Upper King Valley in north-east Victoria, Australia. It is located about 50 km from Wangaratta and is close to the Alpine National Park.

Cheshunt Post Office opened on 2 August 1886.

The Cheshunt post office now operates out of the general store/ takeaway food shop.

Golfers play at the course of the Whitfield and District Golf Club.

Following the merger of the small local primary school in 1993 with Whitfield Primary School, primary aged children must now travel to the renamed Whitfield District Primary school a short distance up the road.

Cheshunt also has a local public/ memorial hall and several wineries in the immediate area.

A popular local recreational and fishing area is Lake William Hovel further up the valley.

== Population ==
At the 2011 census, Cheshunt and the surrounding area had a population of 256, while in the 2016 census the number had dropped to 231. By the 2021 census the population had reduced further, to 213.
