= Glenrowan, Victoria =

Glenrowan
- Town
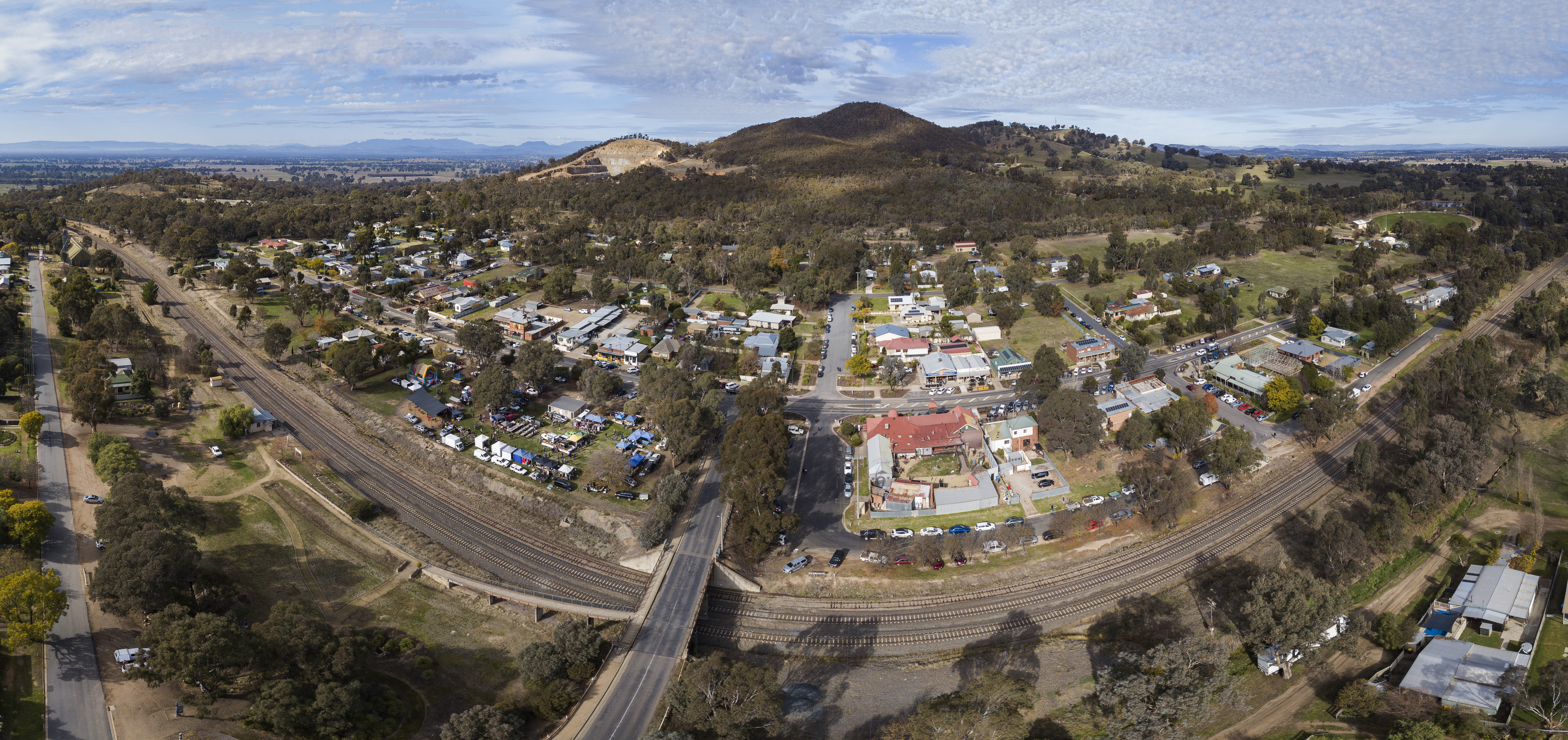
- Aerial panorama of Glenrowan

- Interactive map of Glenrowan
- Coordinates: 36°27′45″S 146°13′21″E
- Country: Australia
- State: Victoria
- Region: Hume
- LGAs: Rural City of Wangaratta; Rural City of Benalla
- Location: 236 km (147 mi) NE of Melbourne; 86.2 km (53.6 mi) SW of Wodonga; 16.3 km (10.1 mi) SW of Wangaratta; 27.3 km (17.0 mi) NE of Benalla

Government
  - State electorate: Ovens Valley
  - Federal division: Indi
- Elevation: 232 m (761 ft)

Population
  - Total: 1,049 (2021 census)
- Postcode: 3675

Glenrowan is a town in the Wangaratta local government area of Victoria, Australia. It is 236 kilometres north-east of Melbourne and 14 kilometres from Wangaratta and near the Warby Ranges and Mount Glenrowan. At the 2021 census, Glenrowan had a population of 1,049.

== History ==
Glenrowan was named after farmers James and George Rowan who ran farms in the area between 1846 and 1858. The township was settled in the late 1860s, the Post Office opening on 22 February 1870. It is famous for the bushranger Ned Kelly, who made his last stand and was eventually captured there in 1880 after a siege and shootout with police. The local railway station opened in 1874 and closed to passengers in 1981.

The town gives its name to the Glenrowan wine region which was formally defined in 2003, with the first grape vines planted in 1866.

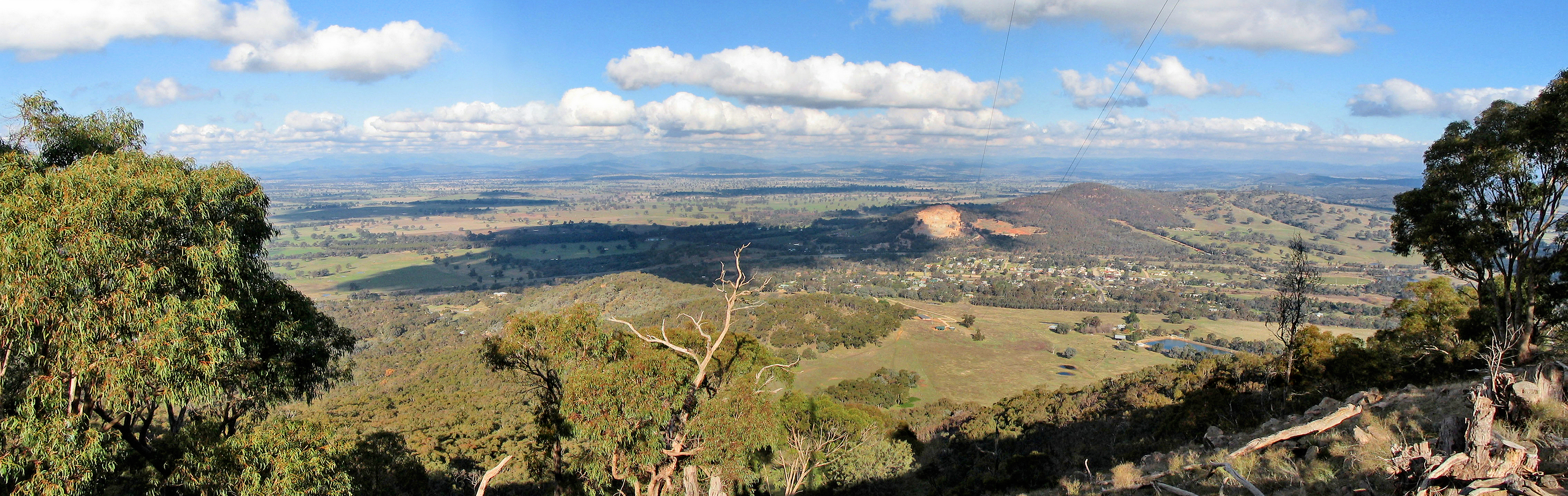
Panoramic view from Mt Glenrowan towards the town of Glenrowan

== The town today ==
Glenrowan is a popular rest point for those travelling on the Hume Freeway. In the township of Glenrowan, off the highway, tourists can rest, walk and examine the famous Kelly siege sites. The town is home to a large service centre.

Glenrowan Recreation Reserve serves as the home ground of the Wangaratta Knights rugby league club, which competes in the Goulburn Murray Rugby League competition.

The town had an Australian rules football team competing in the Ovens & King Football League however went in to recess after the 2019 season due to lack of support.

=== Climate ===
Glenrowan has a temperate climate, typical of north-eastern Victoria. The summers and usually hot and dry with occasional heatwaves during December, January and February. Winters are cool with fog and frost. The area gets regular rainfall throughout most of the year outside of the summer months.

Climate data for Glenrowan, Victoria
Month	Jan	Feb	Mar	Apr	May	Jun	Jul	Aug	Sep	Oct	Nov	Dec	Year
Mean daily maximum °C (°F)	29.6 (85.3)	29.6 (85.3)	26.3 (79.3)	20.9 (69.6)	15.9 (60.6)	12.9 (55.2)	11.7 (53.1)	13.3 (55.9)	16.3 (61.3)	19.9 (67.8)	23.5 (74.3)	27.1 (80.8)	20.6 (69.0)
Mean daily minimum °C (°F)	13.8 (56.8)	14.2 (57.6)	11.8 (53.2)	8.3 (46.9)	5.5 (41.9)	3.3 (37.9)	2.5 (36.5)	3.5 (38.3)	5.1 (41.2)	7.4 (45.3)	9.3 (48.7)	11.7 (53.1)	8.0 (46.4)
Average precipitation mm (inches)	46 (1.8)	34 (1.3)	42 (1.7)	50 (2.0)	68 (2.7)	57 (2.2)	70 (2.8)	75 (3.0)	66 (2.6)	67 (2.6)	45 (1.8)	47 (1.9)	667 (26.4)
Source: Glenrowan climate

== Works on the area and Ned Kelly ==
=== Books ===
Though a very small locality, many books on the Kelly Gang's final siege at Glenrowan exist. Though many works discuss land selection, social conflict etc., they all have many details, photos, maps, sketches and facts about 1880 Glenrowan, its railway, the two hotels, and planned train derailment.

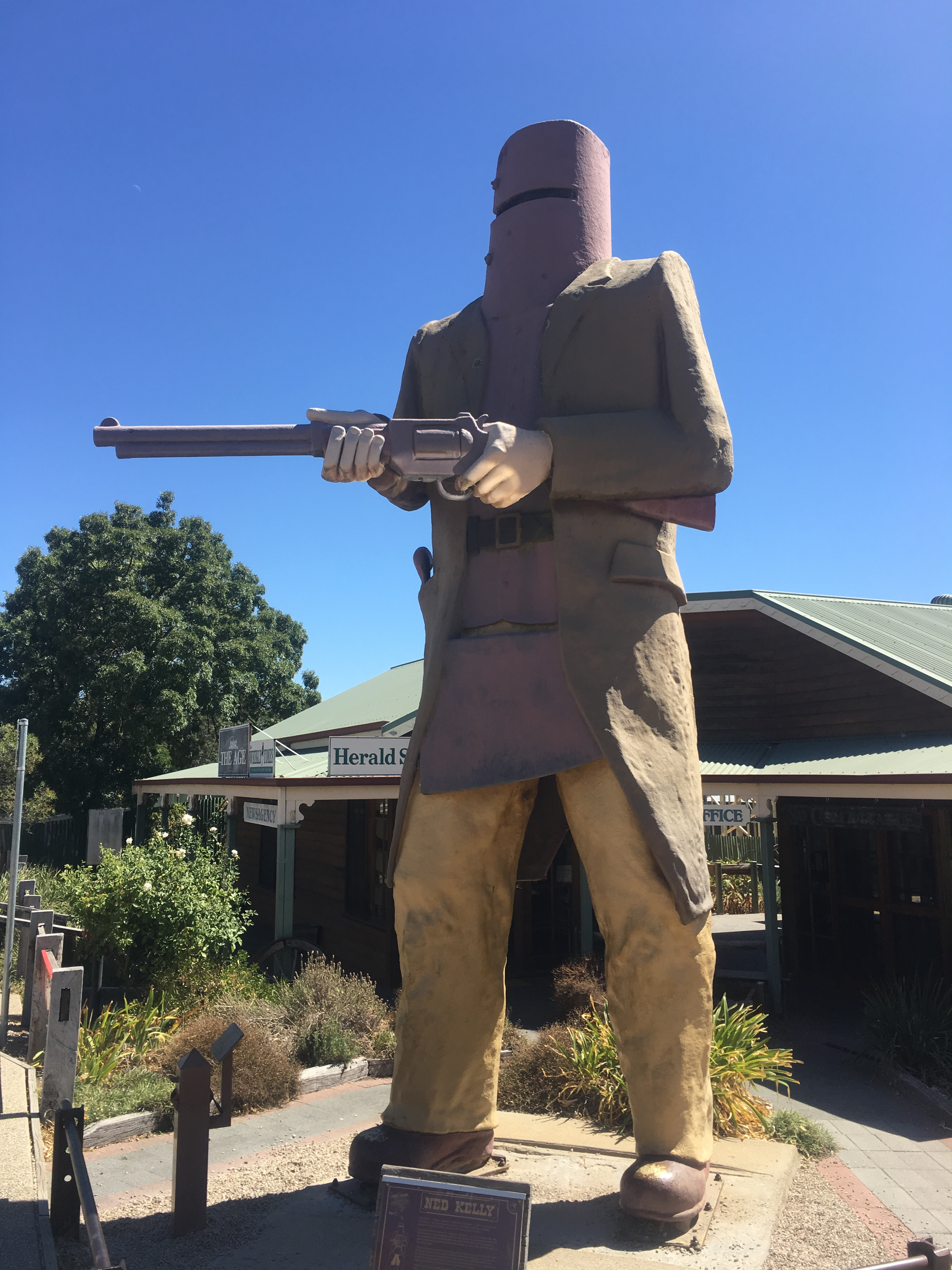
Statue of Ned Kelly on the main street of Glenrowan

- Kenneally, J. J. The Inner History of the Kelly Gang, 1929 (many reprints available- this was a watershed pro-Kelly work) shows pictures of Glenrowan during the 1880s
- Brown, Max. Australian Son, Georgian House, Melbourne, 1948 (plus subsequent reprints) shows pictures of Glenrowan in the 1940s
- Carey, Peter, True History of the Kelly Gang, Vintage, 2001 (this is fiction; not a history)
- Cave, Colin (ed.) Ned Kelly Man and Myth, Cassel North Melbourne, 1963. (an important watershed work in lifting the Kelly story into the academic arena)
- Jones, Ian. Ned Kelly: A Short Life, Lothian, Port Melbourne, 1995. (a comprehensive work including sketches of Glenrowan and the Kelly siege)
- Prior, Tom. et al., A Pictorial History of Bushrangers, Paul Hamlyn, Sydney, 1968. (many photos of Glenrowan in 1880 taken during and after the Kelly siege at the hotel)
- Molitorisz, Sacha. The Romance of Robbery: Australian Bushrangers, Murray David, French Forest, 1998, ISBN 1-876411-01-5 (photos and contemporary drawings of Ned Kelly at Glenrowan)
- McQuilton, John. The Kelly Outbreak 1878-1880, Melbourne University Press, 1979. (a watershed academic work which discusses land selection in the vicinity of Glenrowan)
- Phillips, John, The Trial of Ned Kelly, The Law Book Company, North Ryde, 1987.
- Clune, Frank. The Kelly Hunters, 1954.
- Osborne, Charles. Ned Kelly, Sphere Books, London, 1970.
- Sadlier, John, Recollections of a Victorian Police Officer, (1913)Penguin Colonial Facsimiles Ringwood, 1973. (autobiography from a Kelly Gang police pursuer and conflicts in the Glenrowan locale)

=== Plays ===
- Douglas Stewart, Ned Kelly, 1943. (play for radio broadcasts)

=== TV movies ===
- The Last Outlaw (1980) (a TV mini-series)

=== Fictional novels set around Glenrowan ===
- "O'Brien, Antony. Bye-Bye Dolly Gray, Artillery Publishing, Hartwell, 2006."

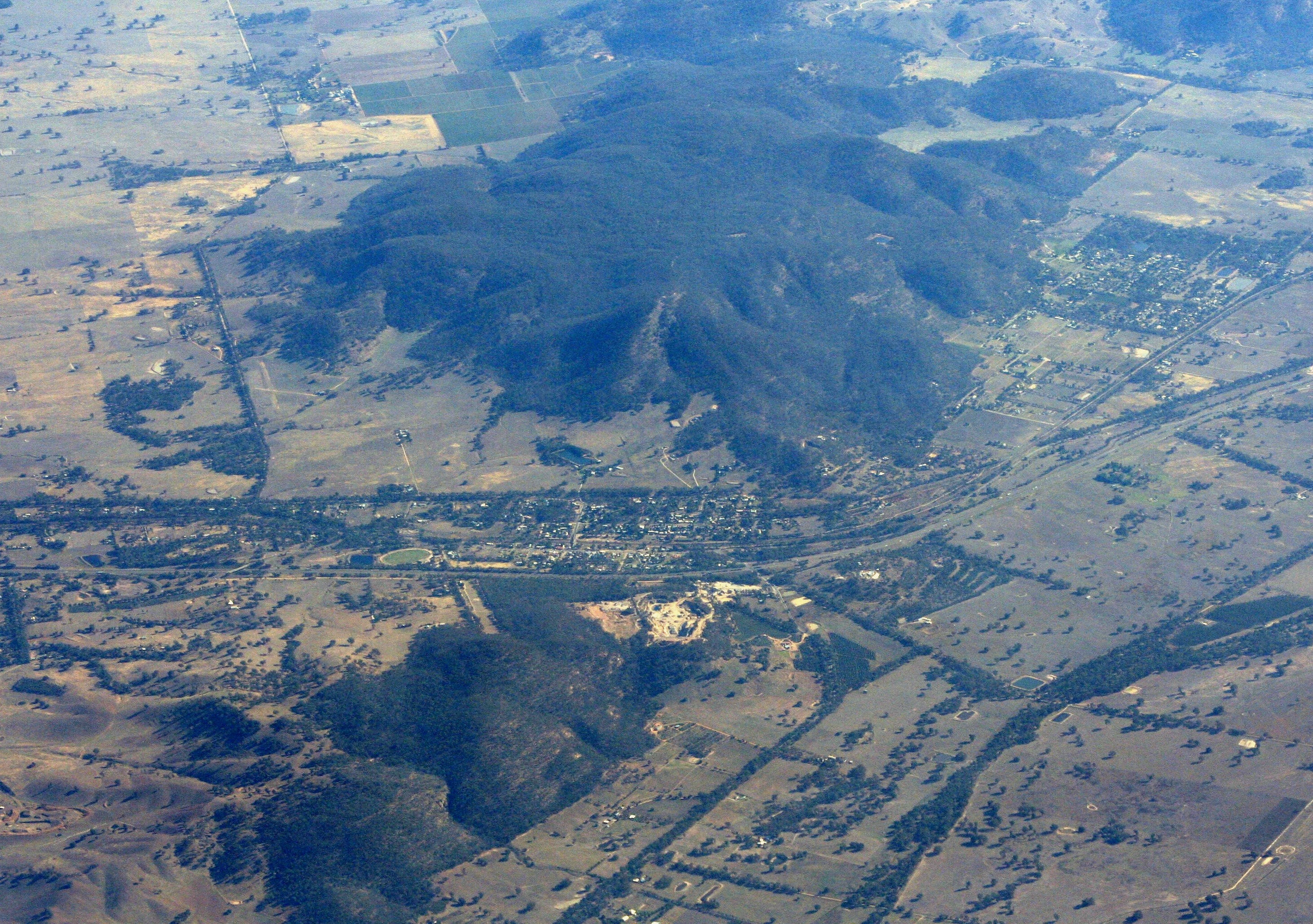
Aerial view from the east
