= Moyhu =

- Town
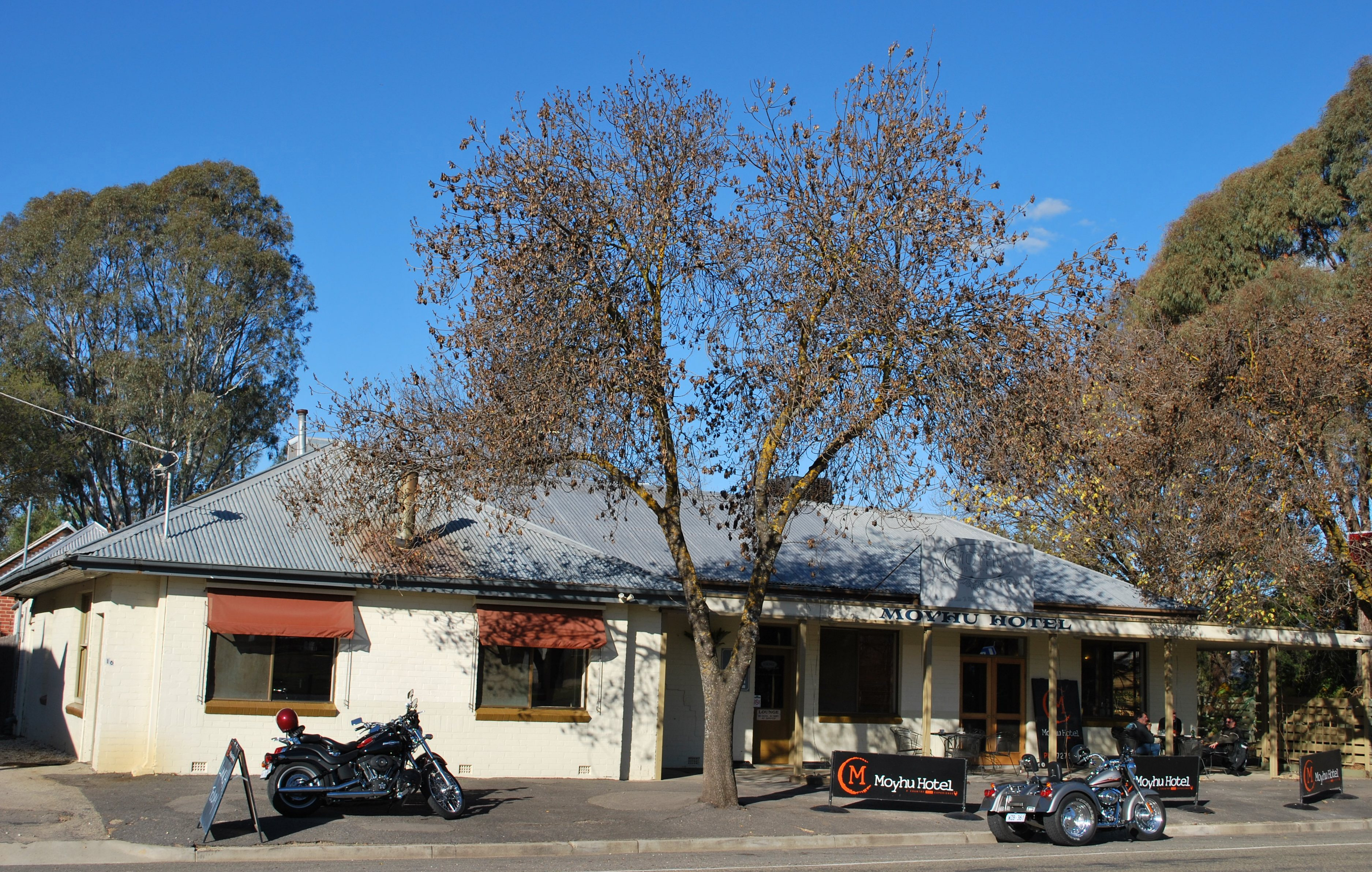
- Moyhu Hotel

- Interactive map of Moyhu
- Coordinates: 36°34′0″S 146°22′0″E
- Country: Australia
- State: Victoria
- Region: Hume
- LGA: Rural City of Wangaratta
- Location: 266 km (165 mi) NE of Melbourne; 26.9 km (16.7 mi) SE of Wangaratta

Government
  - State electorate: Ovens Valley
  - Federal division: Indi

Population
  - Total: 437 (2021 census)
- Postcode: 3732

Moyhu is a town in the Rural City of Wangaratta Local Government Area, Victoria, Australia. It is situated in the fertile King Valley, near the King River, which flows from the Victorian Alps and joins the Ovens River in Wangaratta.

The town is about 2.5 hours drive from Melbourne, and 25 minutes from Wangaratta, and is part of the Rural City of Wangaratta. At the 2006 census, Moyhu had a population of 536. but at the 2011 census, the population had declined to 428: 216 males and 212 females. 50.5% of the population was male and 49.5% female. Aboriginal and Torres Strait Islander people made up 0.7% of the population, and approximately 20% of the population consisted of children aged 0–14.

== History ==
Moyhu, Mayhu, Moihu from Moydow, Ireland, home of original settlers, the Farrell family. The lush 92,000 acres of the King Valley was originally taken up as a pastoral leasehold 'Oxley Plains' by squatters George and William Pitt Faithfull in 1838. The principal residence was initially near Oxley. The King River Crossing between Milawa and the Myrhree Station became Moyhu in the 1860s. Changes to regulations led to the splitting of Oxley Plains Station in 1848. The partnership of the brothers was dissolved. George retained the lease for the northern half of the run, Oxley Plains. Dominick Farrell became William Pitt Faithfull's (Goulburn NSW) appointed oversee for the southern portion, the 45,000 'Edi' pastoral run. He took over from John Moore. The homestead was situated at Black Range Creek, Moyhu South and it was known as Ten Mile Hollow, later known as 'The Hollow'. Farrell purchased the freehold of what remained of the original run; with cattle, horses. buildings and 16000 sheep, in 1857 for five thousand pounds.

Moyhu was the dairy farm for Edi pastoral run, and was the preferred land for selection under the pre-emptive rights clause, albeit not granted as the principal residence was still at Edi. The earliest selector was Thomas Byrne and his family who arrived in the late 1850s and lived near Meadow Creek. Son Andrew's property developed at Ballenvalley north of Moyhu and he donated the land for the establishment of St John of the Holy Cross Catholic Church. With the death of Dominick Farrell snr in 1866, Byrne became the most significant resident of Moyhu. He represented the district as Councillor, set up the Catholic Church, Racing Club, Butter factories, co-operative store and sponsored any club of note. The first land sales were in 1859. Farrell's nephew Dominick arrived in 1863 and married Catherine Byrne. Through the seventies the town hosted, Thursday markets, annual horse races and a timber mill. The name of the town came from Moydow, a village in Longford, Ireland; home of the Farrell clan. The Post Office opened on 1 January 1868.

The first known school at Moyhu was a Rural School No 96 which was granted aid by the Board of Education in mid 1871. It was a bark-roof slab building. From this beginning State School 1335 Moyhu was established in January 1874, with a new building on a 2-acre site. A new building was erected in 1907, with major additions made in 1959. A surveying error made when the township was originally surveyed placed the school a mile from the township. The school became important as a group-leader in the district.

3061 Moyhu North opened in a slab building in September 1890, but closed at the end of 1891 due to low enrolments. 2464 Moyhu South was later named Edi. It opened in May 1882. In July 1888 it operated half time with 2894 Witfield North, and in 1893 with 2676 Boggy Creek. It resumed full-time in 1895. In 1902 the school was relocated to cater for rural and railway families.

During the late 19th century, Moyhu was a lively centre. There were several butter factories, and it was the venue of race meetings, dances and other social events. Victoria's first 2 ft 6 in (762 mm) narrow-gauge railway was opened in 1899, which connected Moyhu, and other settlements along the King Valley, with the main broad-gauge line at Wangaratta.

== The town today ==
Moyhu is the home of several annual events - the Easter Fair at the local primary school every Easter Monday, a Garden Expo every October, Guy Fawkes bonfire, and a popular New Year's Eve celebration in the Lions Park. It is also a central location for popular tourist attractions in the area such as Glenrowan (the scene of Ned Kelly's last stand) and the King Valley gourmet region.

== Sport and recreation ==
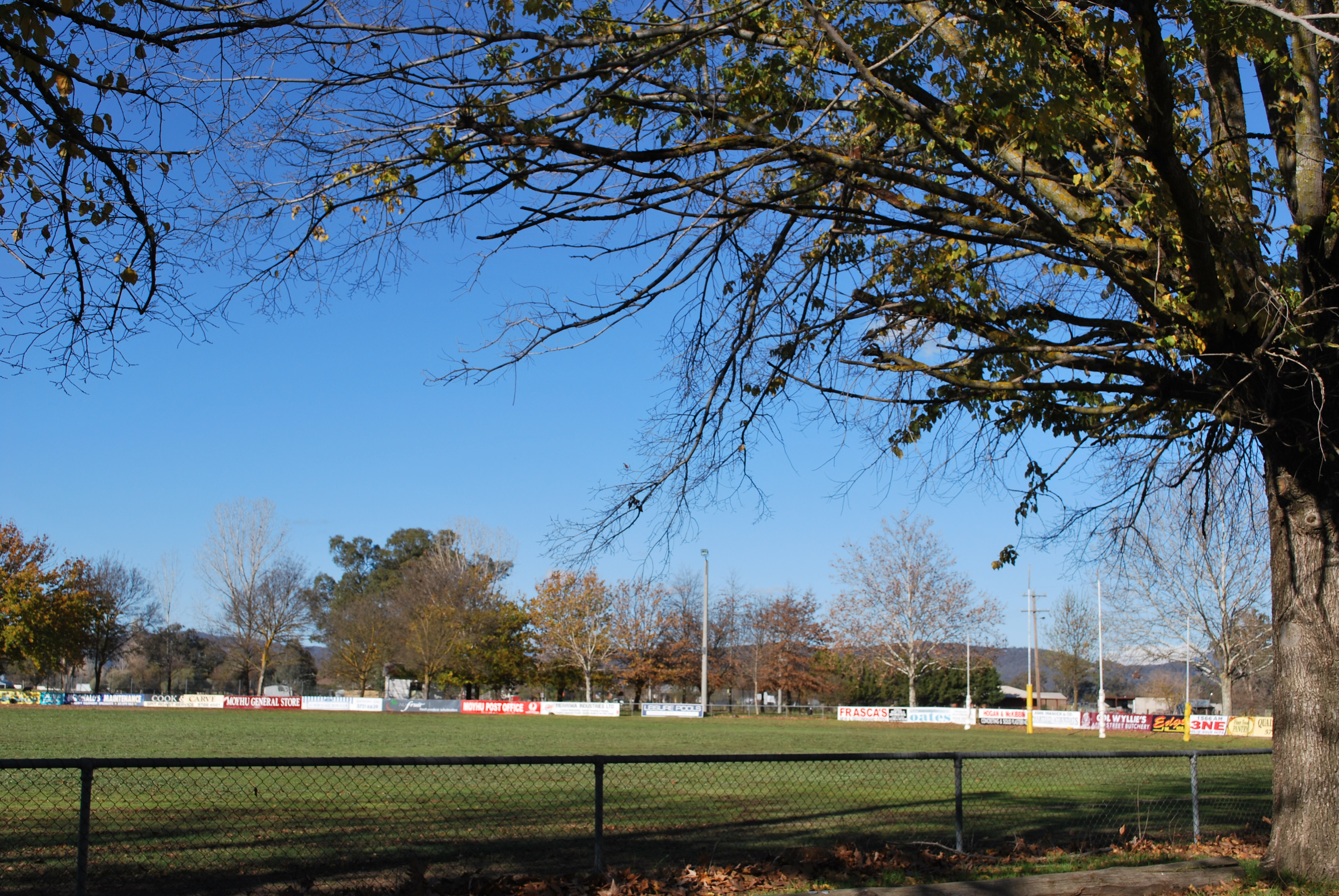
Moyhu Recreation Reserve

The current Moyhu Recreation Reserve on the Moyhu - Greta Road, was established in 1940 and originally had a dirt bicycle track around the perimeter of the sports oval, which also had a turf cricket wicket, which was used by the Moyhu Cricket Club, when they competed in the Wangaratta and District Cricket Association.

Moyhu Rangers were a soccer club that was active between 1925 and 1930. In 1929 the Moyhu Soccer Club won the Ledger Cup defeating Whorouly.

The Moyhu Cricket Club originally played in the Moyhu and District Cricket Association in 1910, then the Ovens and King Cricket Association, winning the 1948/49 premiership and later played in the Wangaratta and District Cricket Association and finally the Wangaratta Sunday Cricket Association (WSCA), winning the 1992/93 premiership, before folding after the WSCA went into recess after the 2002/2003 season.

In 1937, the Moyhu Golf Club held their Annual General Meeting.

The town has an Australian Rules football club since 1892 and have competed in the Ovens & King Football League since 1904, with two football teams and five netball teams.

== Media ==
Moyhu receives Television from the local Transmission site near Wodonga and Beechworth. However it does not receive Prime7 News like the Wodonga-Albury region does. Prime7, WIN, Southern Cross Nine, ABC, SBS.
