= Alice Manfield =

Australian mountain guide

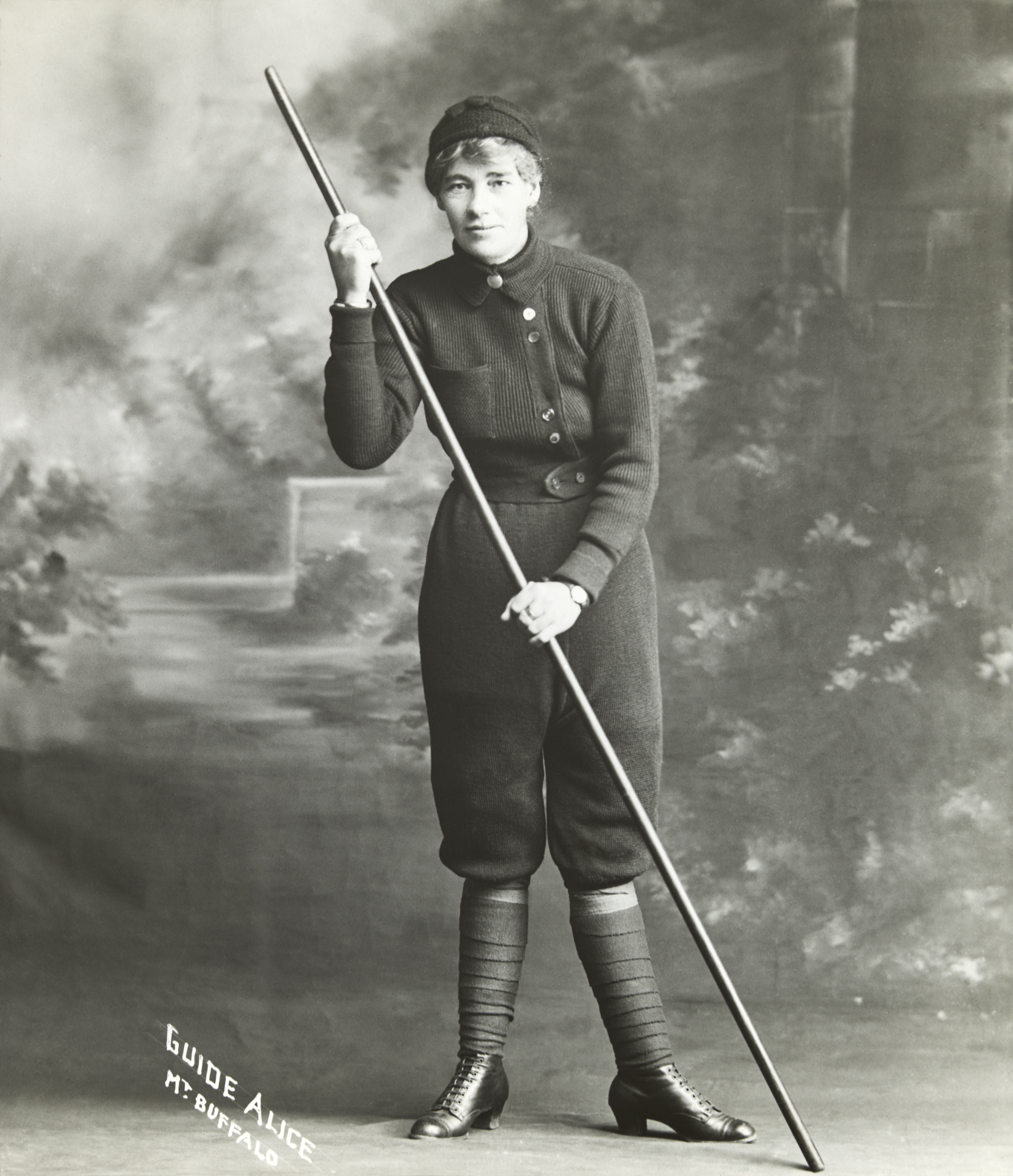
- Guide Alice, Mount Buffalo, c. 1900–30
- Born: 1878; Nailsea Farm, Buckland Valley, Victoria
- Died: 14 July 1960 (aged 82)
- Other name: Guide Alice
- Occupations: Mountain guide, naturalist
- Years active: 1890s–1930s
- Known for: Mountain guide at Mount Buffalo
- Spouse: John Edmund Manfield
- Children: Genevieve Baumgarten
- Parent(s): James and Jane Manfield

Alice Manfield (1878 – 14 July 1960) commonly known as Guide Alice, was a mountain guide, amateur naturalist, chalet owner, photographer, and early feminist figure from Victoria, Australia. Her pioneering work at Mount Buffalo from the 1890s to the 1930s led to her becoming a tourist attraction in her own right, and helped lead to the establishment of the Mount Buffalo National Park.

== Early life ==
Alice was born on the Manfield property, Nailsea Farm, in the Buckland Valley southeast of Mount Buffalo, in 1878, one of eight children born to James Manfield and his wife Jane. An experienced coal miner, James arrived in Victoria with his brother John in 1854 from Nailsea, Somerset, England joining the population boom during the Victorian gold rush. They made their way to the goldfields in the Buckland Valley, and later purchased a property there with the proceeds of their gold mining. Still chasing gold, they travelled to New Zealand and New South Wales, but within ten years had returned to the Buckland Valley to concentrate on working their farm.

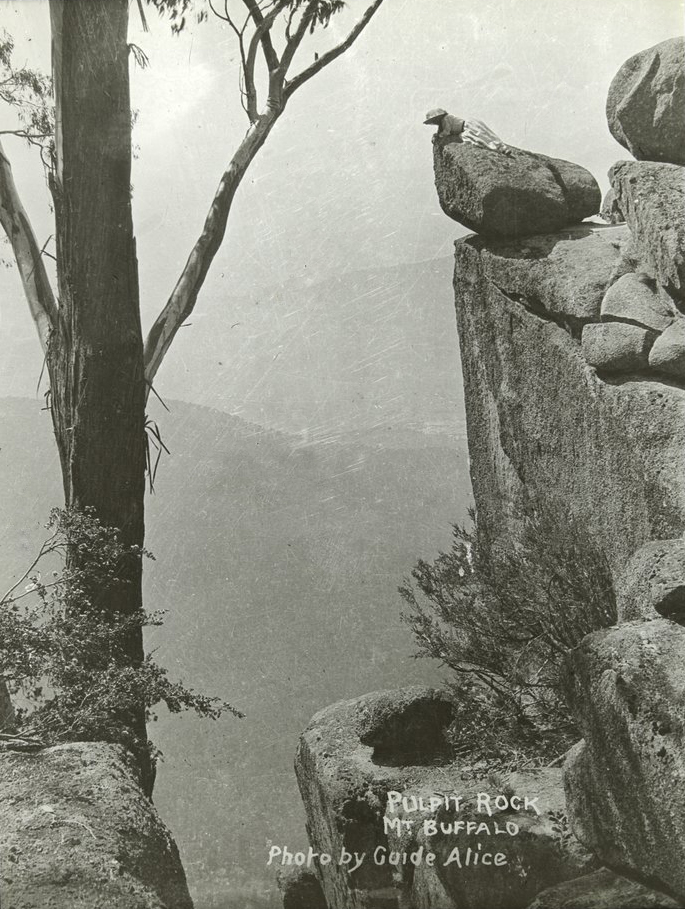
Pulpit Rock, Mount Buffalo, by Guide Alice (the figure in the photo is also thought to be Alice)

Despite being over 200 miles (320 km) from Melbourne, Mount Buffalo was recognised for its special geology and botany by the likes of the noted Government botanist Ferdinand von Mueller, and started to attract a small flow of tourists. The extension of the railway to Myrtleford in 1883, then on to Bright in 1890, meant that in less than eight hours travellers from the capital could be within reach of Mt Buffalo. Locals began to see the tourism opportunities. In 1888 a tender was issued to build a hotel at the start of a new track up the mountain, and Alice's father James Manfield won.

In 1890 Manfield's Buffalo Falls Temperance Hotel was opened at the foot of the mountain, with the Manfields providing the guests with transport between the hotel and Porepunkah station. James, or one of his children, would then lead energetic guests on the three-hour climb to the Buffalo plateau, where they could explore or camp out.

In December 1890 one of the early visitors to the hotel was the then 25-year-old future war hero General Sir John Monash, who reported the hotel to be "in a very unfinished state, and little furnished", but he also recognised its potential. Returning a year later, Monash stated that the hotel was now "the height of comfort". Monash returned to Buffalo many more times over the years, always engaging the Manfields for guides and equipment.

Although only about twelve years old when the hotel opened, Alice was regularly involved in the expeditions around the mountain, thereby developing a love and extensive knowledge of the flora, fauna, and rugged Mount Buffalo landscape.

== Guide Alice ==
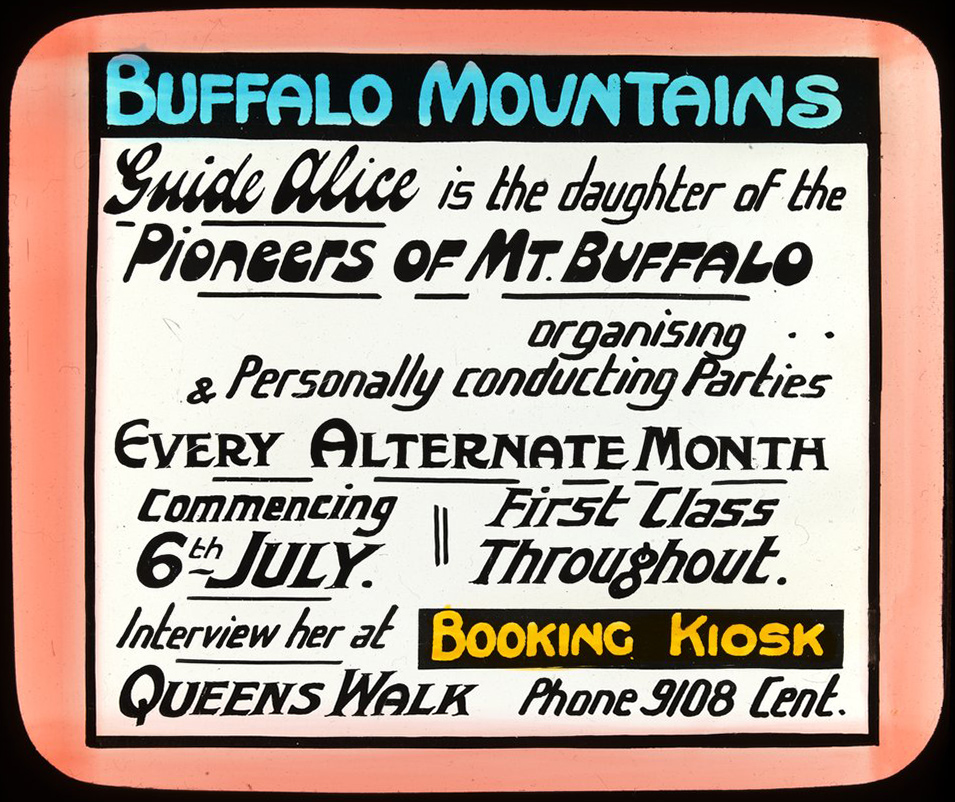
A tourist advertisement for Guide Alice from the early 1900s

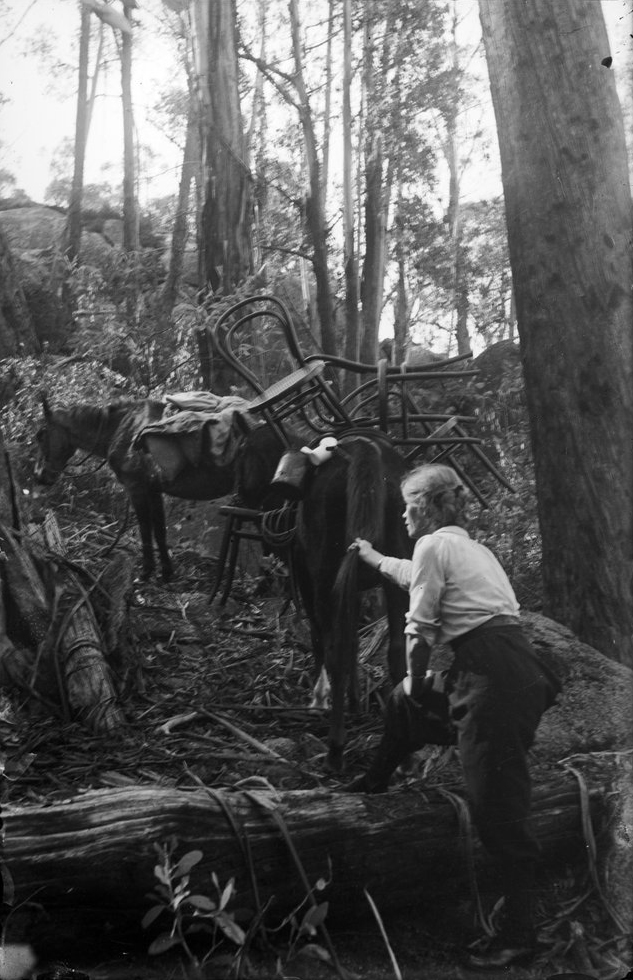
Manfield with packhorses carrying wooden chairs up the mountain

Manfield soon became involved in leading tours up the mountain herself, and became widely and fondly known as Guide Alice. In the early days the only access to the subalpine Buffalo plateau was by a rough unsigned track accessible only by walking or on horseback, and there was only rudimentary accommodation and no signposting on the plateau itself. Guide Alice served as a calming influence to the burgeoning tourist numbers concerned about the wildlife, dangers on the mountain, and being lost.

The Manfields soon built a second hotel, a small timber chalet built near Bents Lookout on the plateau itself, and gave it the affectionate name of Granny's Place. Alice eventually took over the running of Granny's Place, happy to spend long periods of time alone there, and regarding as "thrilling adventures" such events as bushfires, severe storms, and snow up to 8 feet (2.4 m) deep, at which time the chalet had to be entered via the chimney.

=== Equipment ===
With limited equipment available at the time for outdoor activities, and almost nothing designed specifically for women, Manfield designed her own gear. Although she sometimes dressed in a skirt, Manfield controversially wore pant suits for the cold conditions experienced in her job, long before this would become common clothing for women. Her pant suit consisted of a type of woollen bloomers or knickerbockers, and a high-necked buttoned jacket pulled in tightly around the waist. This was accompanied by puttees tightly wrapped around her calves, a low-heeled leather walking boot, a beanie, and a long walking pole.

=== National park ===
Manfield impressed visitors with her enthusiasm and extensive knowledge of Mount Buffalo. With her skills as a naturalist and photographer, she became a sought-after guide. Her passion for the mountain, and the novelty of her being a female guide, led to Manfield herself becoming a tourist attraction, helping to add to the popularity of the mountain.

Following local activism, in 1898 the Victorian government declared 1,166 hectares (2,880 acres) of land on the plateau as Mount Buffalo National Park.

In 1908 a road was opened to the plateau. In a predominantly male gathering, Guide Alice was photographed holding the ribbon at the road's official opening as the Premier of Victoria, Sir Thomas Bent, prepared to cut it.

With the road leading to increased tourism, in 1910 the Public Works Department built a government owned guesthouse close by the Manfield's chalet. The new government chalet appealed more to passive tourists, while chalets owned by the Manfields and another local family, the Carlile family, were better suited to those wanting a more basic and adventurous experience.

=== Later years ===
Despite the declaration of the national park and the coming of the road, Guide Alice's services remained in demand, and she continued in the role of mountain guide. Distinguished visitors called on her, including the likes of David Syme, proprietor of The Age newspaper, landscape artist Sir Arthur Streeton, and Sir John Monash.

Manfield retired from guiding during the 1930s, when she would have been in her fifties, and died in 1960 at eighty-two.

=== Publications ===
In 1924 Manfield released The Lyre-Birds of Mount Buffalo, a 23-page volume detailing her studies into the lyrebirds on Mount Buffalo. This volume featured Manfield's own photography and had an introduction by Charles Barrett, C.M.Z.S. This was the first pictorial record of lyrebirds to be released.

== Personal life ==
Manfield married a distant cousin, John Edmund Manfield, a ranger with the Parks Service, in 1917. They had one child, a daughter named Genevieve Baumgarten.

== Death and legacy ==
Manfield died on 14 July 1960 and was buried in the Bright cemetery at the foot of the mountains. A bronze plaque has been placed there to honour her memory.

A large collection of Manfield's photographs is held by the State Library of Victoria. These have been digitised and are available online. The library's Manuscript Collection also holds an archive of press clippings, notes and other materials related to the Manfield family.

== See also ==
- Gustav Weindorfer, a similarly influential figure at Tasmania's Cradle Mountain
