= Porepunkah railway station =

Former railway station in Victoria, Australia

Coordinates: 36°42′S 146°55′E

Porepunkah

General information
- Location: Station Street, Porepunkah; Australia
- Elevation: 281 m (922 ft)
- Owner: Victorian Railways
- Operator: Victorian Railways
- Line: Bright
- Distance: 309.90 kilometres from Southern Cross
- Platforms: 1
- Tracks: 1

Construction
- Structure type: Ground

History
- Opened: 17 October 1890
- Closed: 30 November 1983

Services
Preceding station	Disused railways	Following station
Eurobin	Bright line	Bright
	List of closed railway stations in Victoria	
Location

Porepunkah railway station was located on the Bright line serving the town of Porepunkah in Victoria. It opened on 17 October 1890 and closed on 30 November 1983.

Porepunkah station was the location where the Manfield family transported tourists who were staying with them on their trips to Mount Buffalo Chalet. It is now part of the Murray to the Mountains Rail Trail.
