= Eurobin railway station =

Former railway station in Victoria, Australia

Coordinates: 36°38′20″S 146°51′49″E

Eurobin

General information
- Location: Great Alpine Road, Eurobin; Australia
- Elevation: 252 m (827 ft)
- Owner: Victorian Railways
- Operator: Victorian Railways
- Line: Bright
- Distance: 302.00 kilometres from Southern Cross
- Platforms: 1
- Tracks: 1

Construction
- Structure type: Ground

History
- Opened: 17 October 1890
- Closed: 30 November 1983

Services
Preceding station	Disused railways	Following station
Ovens	Bright line	Porepunkah
	List of closed railway stations in Victoria	
Location

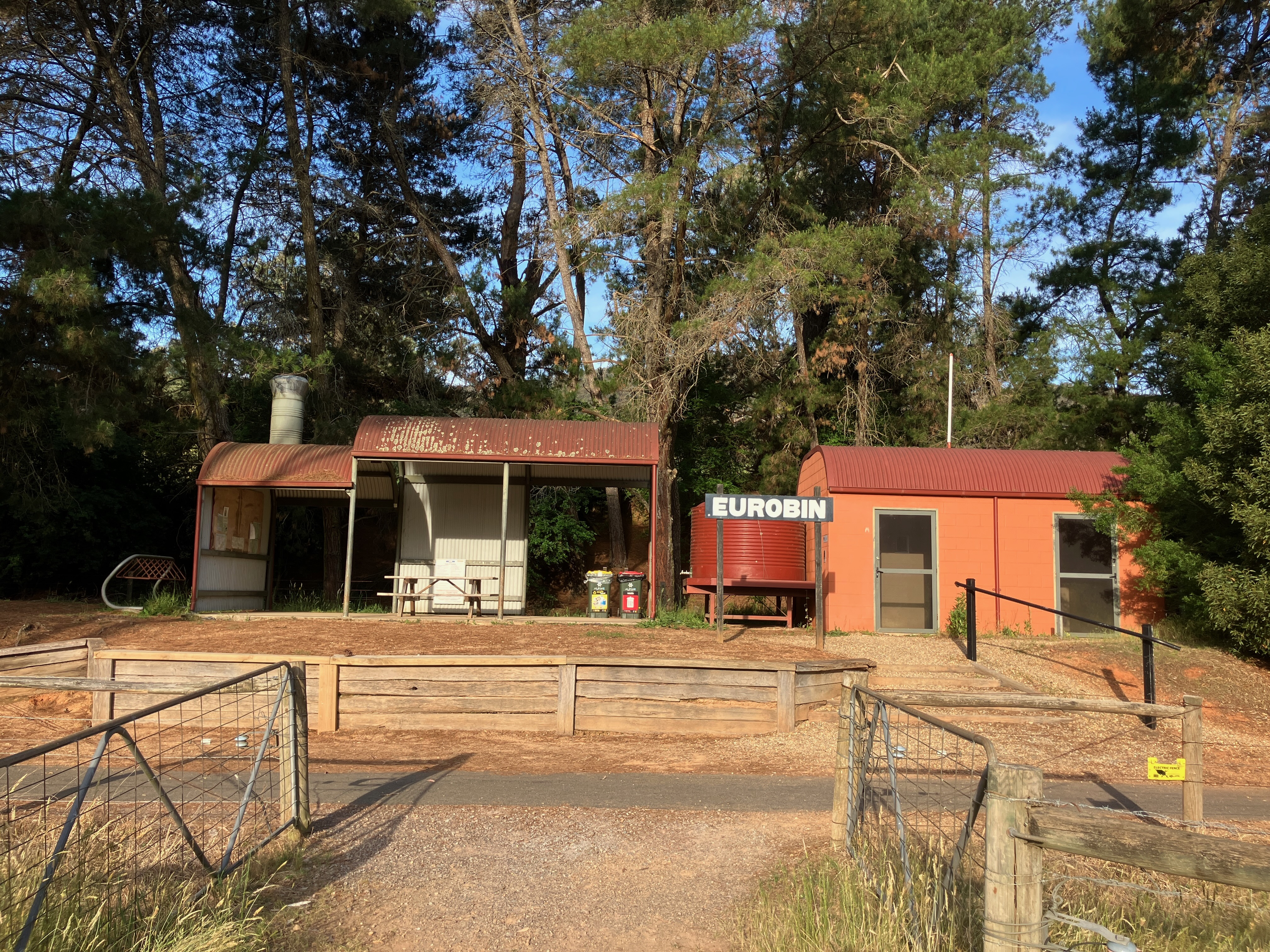
Site of Eurobin Railway Station now a rest stop in the shape of a steam train on the Murray to Mountains Rail Trail (Nov 24)

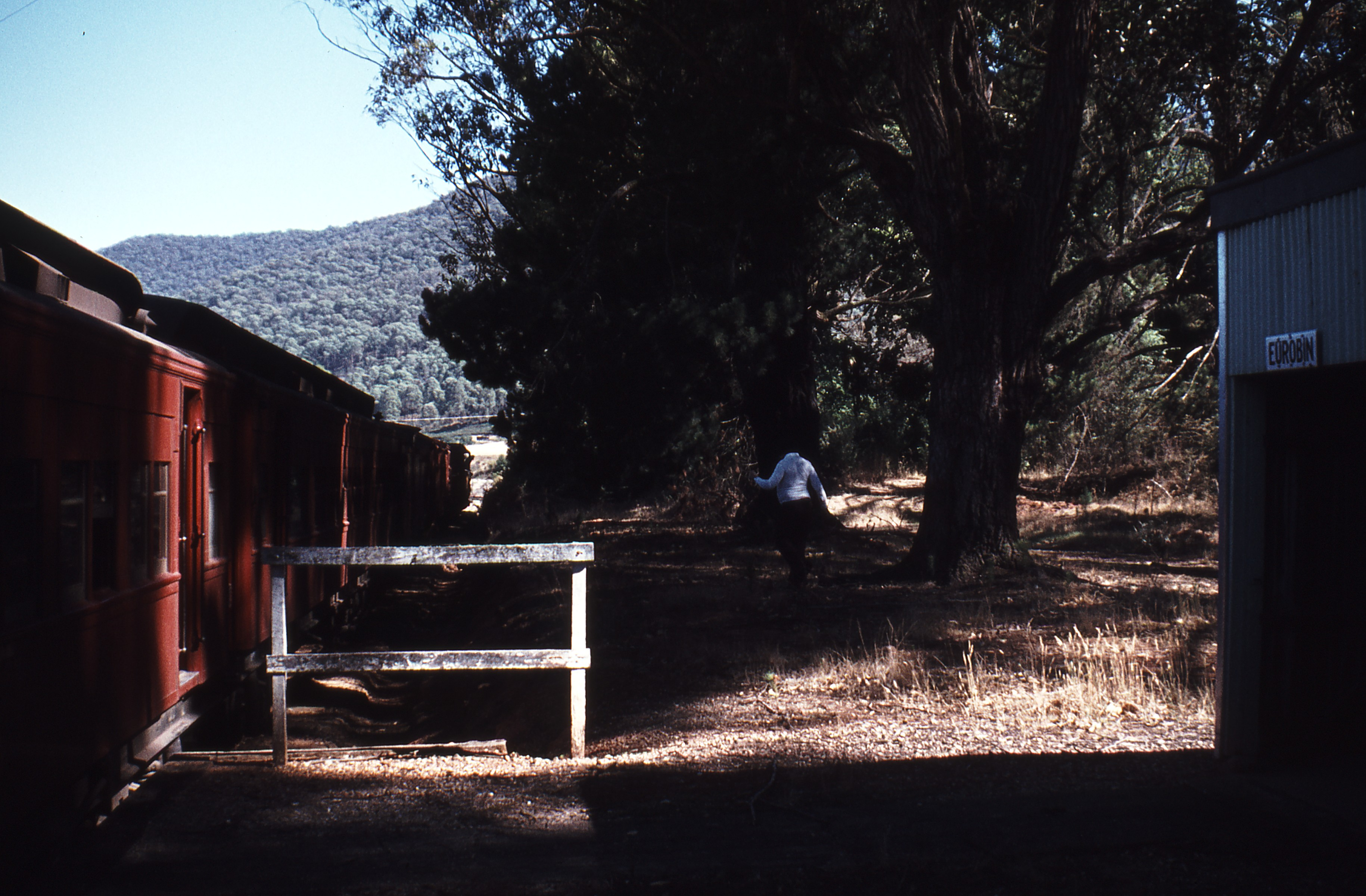
Photograph of Eurobin railway station taken on 29 December 1977

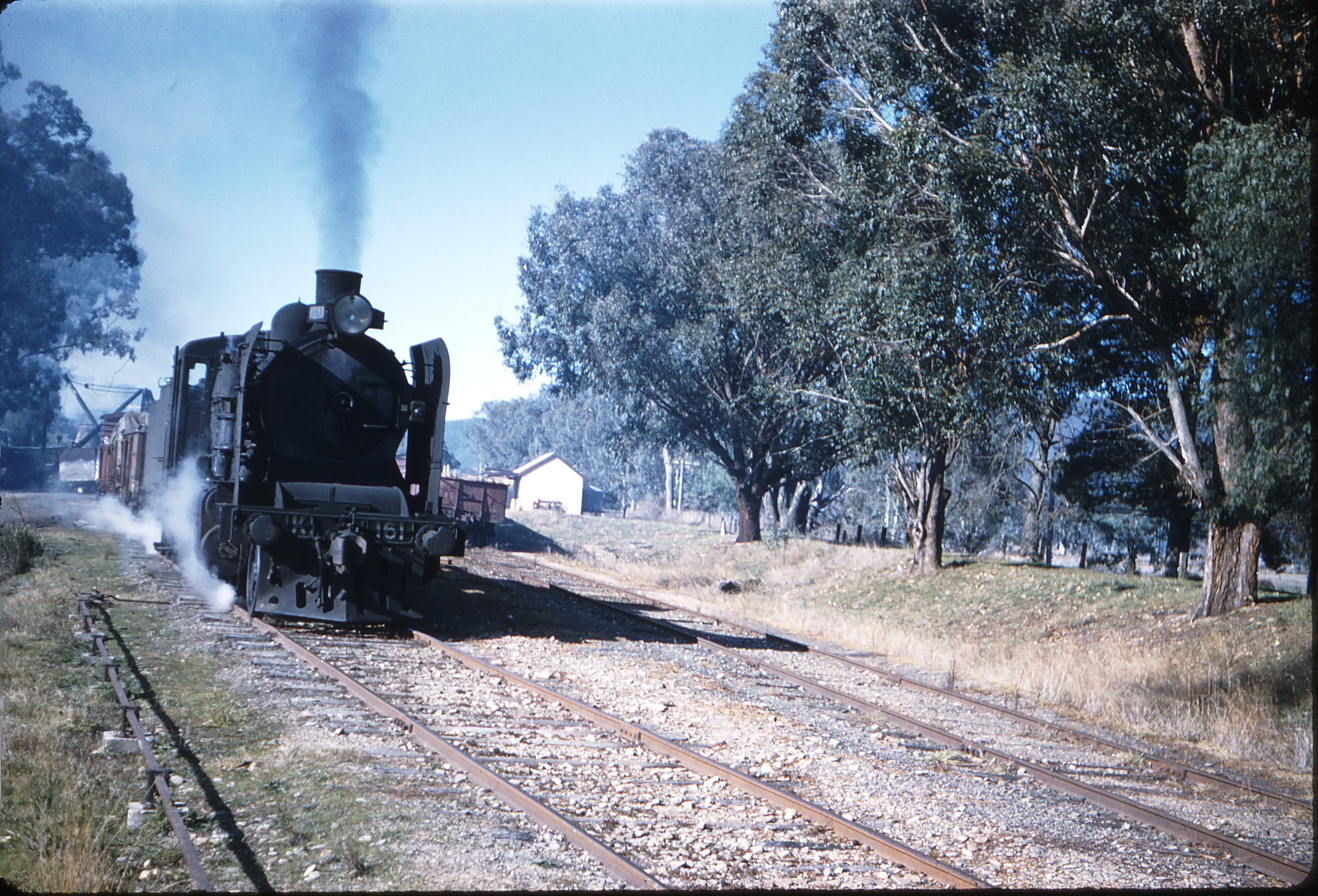
Steam train leaving Eurobin station taken 26 May 1960

Eurobin railway station was located on the Bright line serving the town of Eurobin in Victoria. It opened on 17 October 1890 and closed on 30 November 1983. A new shelter and toilet buildings have been constructed on the site of the former station in the shape of a steam train, as part of the Murray to the Mountains Rail Trail. The station was situated 2km east of St Clement's Church Eurobin and directly opposite Eurobin Presbyterian Church.

== Operations and Economic Impact ==
Timber was dispatched weekly from Eurobin station, and horse feed, goods, and parcels were regularly delivered to the area. Seasonally, the railway was vital for transporting hops, tobacco, and other produce from the Eurobin region.

== Community Protest Against Closure ==
A news article from 5 November 1892 describes a meeting of Eurobin residents protesting a motion to close the station. After much discussion, the community reached a unanimous decision to oppose the closure, arguing that both past and current traffic levels warranted keeping the station open. They emphasized that closing it would be a significant injustice to every member of the community. An emphatic protest was organized to be presented to the Railway Commissioners on behalf of the residents.

== Gradual Closure of the Line ==
The closure of the Ovens Valley railway occurred progressively. The final scheduled passenger service beyond Myrtleford departed from Bright on 6 April 1978, with only four local residents, including Wal and Thelma Larsen, in attendance. This marked a stark contrast to the line’s grand opening in 1890, when thousands gathered at the station to witness the arrival of the railway. Although regular services ceased, occasional trains still operated to Porepunkah and, at times, extended to Bright, mainly for special events organised by the Bright Historical Society. By 1983, trains no longer ran between Myrtleford and Bright, though tobacco transport services continued operating to Myrtleford until the line’s complete closure in 1987.
