= Ovens railway station =

Former railway station in Victoria, Australia

Coordinates: 36.5890°S 146.7610°E

Ovens

General information
- Location: Great Alpine Road, Ovens; Australia
- Elevation: 224 m (735 ft)
- Owner: Victorian Railways
- Operator: Victorian Railways
- Line: Bright
- Distance: 291.00 kilometres from Southern Cross
- Platforms: 1
- Tracks: 1

Construction
- Structure type: Ground

History
- Opened: 17 October 1890
- Closed: 30 November 1983

Services
| Preceding station | Disused railways | Following station |
|---|---|---|
| Myrtleford | Bright line | Eurobin |
| | List of closed railway stations in Victoria | |
Location

Ovens railway station was located on the Bright line serving the town of Ovens in Victoria. It opened on 17 October 1890 and closed on 30 November 1983.

Goods traffic at the station included pulp for the Australian Paper Mill factory.
