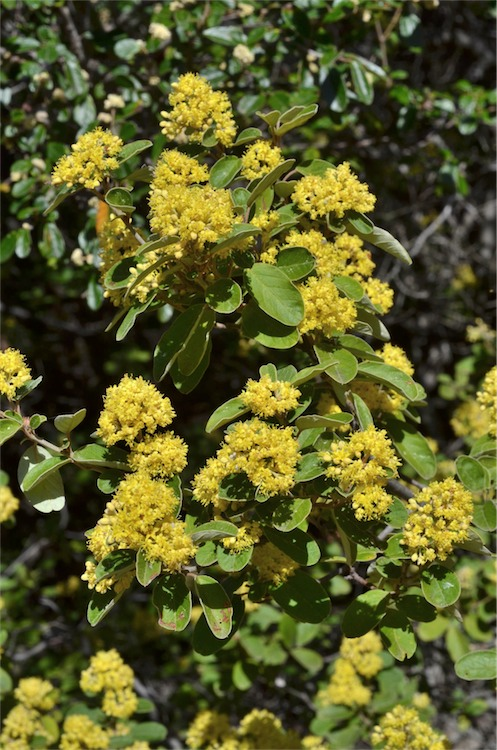
- In the Australian National Botanic Gardens

Scientific classification
- Kingdom: Plantae
- Clade: Tracheophytes
- Clade: Angiosperms
- Clade: Eudicots
- Clade: Rosids
- Order: Rosales
- Family: Rhamnaceae
- Genus: Pomaderris
- Species: P. velutina

Binomial name
- Pomaderris velutina J.H.Willis

= Pomaderris velutina =

Species of shrub

Pomaderris velutina, commonly known as velvety pomaderris or velvet pomaderris, is a species of flowering plant in the family Rhamnaceae and is endemic to south-eastern continental Australia. It is a slender shrub with rusty-hairy young stems, egg-shaped to oblong or more or less elliptic leaves, and loose panicles of pale yellow flowers.

== Description ==
Pomaderris velutina is a slender shrub that typically grows to a height of 1–2 m (3 ft 3 in – 6 ft 7 in), its branchlets covered with soft, star-shaped hairs and rust-coloured simple hairs. The leaves are egg-shaped to oblong or more or less elliptic, mostly 10–30 mm (0.39–1.18 in) long and 6–15 mm (0.24–0.59 in) wide with stipules 3–10 mm (0.12–0.39 in) long at the base. The upper surface of the leaves is densely covered with velvety hairs, the lower surface covered with scattered long hairs. The flowers are yellow and borne in loose, pyramid-shaped panicles 20–80 mm (0.79–3.15 in) long, each flower on a pedicel 1–5 mm (0.039–0.197 in) long, the sepals 1.5–2.5 mm (0.059–0.098 in) long and the petals spatula-shaped and 1.3–1.7 mm (0.051–0.067 in) long. Flowering occurs in October and November.

== Taxonomy ==
Pomaderris velutina was first formally described in 1942 by James Hamlyn Willis in The Victorian Naturalist based on plant material collected from the headwaters of the Ovens River between Bright and Porepunkah in 1941. The specific epithet (velutina) means "velvety".

== Distribution and habitat ==
Velvety pomaderris grows in forest and woodland mainly in steep, rocky sites, but also along creeks and gorges in eastern Victoria and south of Lake Burragorang in New South Wales.
