= Bowman railway station =

Former railway station in Victoria, Australia

Coordinates: 36°29′02″S 146°37′38″E

Bowman

General information
- Location: Whorouly-Bowmans Road, Bowman; Australia
- Elevation: 227 m (745 ft)
- Owner: Victorian Railways
- Operator: Victorian Railways
- Line: Bright
- Distance: 271.95 kilometres from Southern Cross
- Platforms: 1
- Tracks: 1

Construction
- Structure type: Ground

History
- Opened: 17 December 1883
- Closed: 13 April 1987

Services
Preceding station	Disused railways	Following station
Brookfield	Bright line	Myrtleford
	List of closed railway stations in Victoria	
Location

Bowman railway station was located on the Bright line serving the town of Bowman in Victoria. It opened on 17 December 1883 and closed on 13 April 1987.

The former platform mound at Bowman remains clearly evident and is fenced off as private property with a shelter built on top of it. A station sign has also been erected as part of the Murray to the Mountains Rail Trail.
