= Brookfield railway station, Victoria =

Former railway station in Victoria, Australia

Brookfield

General information
- Location: Brookfield; Australia
- Elevation: 182 m (597 ft)
- Owner: Victorian Railways
- Operator: Victorian Railways
- Line: Bright
- Distance: 264.40 kilometres from Southern Cross
- Platforms: 1
- Tracks: 1

Construction
- Structure type: Ground

History
- Opened: September 1888
- Closed: 4 October 1954

Services
Preceding station	Disused railways	Following station
Everton	Bright line	Bowman
	List of closed railway stations in Victoria	

Brookfield railway station was located on the Bright line serving the town of Brookfield in Victoria. It opened in September 1888 and closed on 4 October 1954. A station sign has also been erected as part of the Murray to the Mountains Rail Trail.
