= John Ovens =

- Born: 1788
- Died: 7 December 1825 (aged 36–37)
- Burial place: Devonshire Street Cemetery; Garden Island; St Thomas Rest Park

John Ovens (1788 – 7 December 1825) was an Irish-born soldier, civil engineer and explorer of Australia. He was aide-de-camp to Sir Thomas Brisbane, governor of New South Wales and explored the Murrumbidgee River and Monaro (New South Wales) district with Capt. Mark Currie.

== Life and career ==
Ovens was born in St Catherine, Fermanagh, Ireland and joined the 73rd (Perthshire) Regiment of Foot of the British Army in 1808. He travelled with the regiment in 1810 to the colony of New South Wales. He returned to England in October 1811 and soon transferred to the 74th (Highland) Regiment of Foot under Thomas Brisbane.

Ovens returned to New South Wales when Brisbane was appointed governor and was made acting chief engineer. Brisbane employed Ovens as his private secretary and promoted him to major. In October 1825 Ovens assisted John Oxley to survey Twofold Bay in New South Wales.

Ovens died at his residence and was accorded a grand funeral with regimental cortege and honours.

== Legacy ==
The Ovens River, the town of Ovens, Victoria and the submarine HMAS Ovens were named after him. Also Ovens wattle, Acacia pravissima.
