= Eurobin Presbyterian Church =

Former Presbyterian church in Eurobin, Victoria, Australia

Coordinates: 36°38′22″S 146°51′44″E

- St. John’s Presbyterian Church, Eurobin
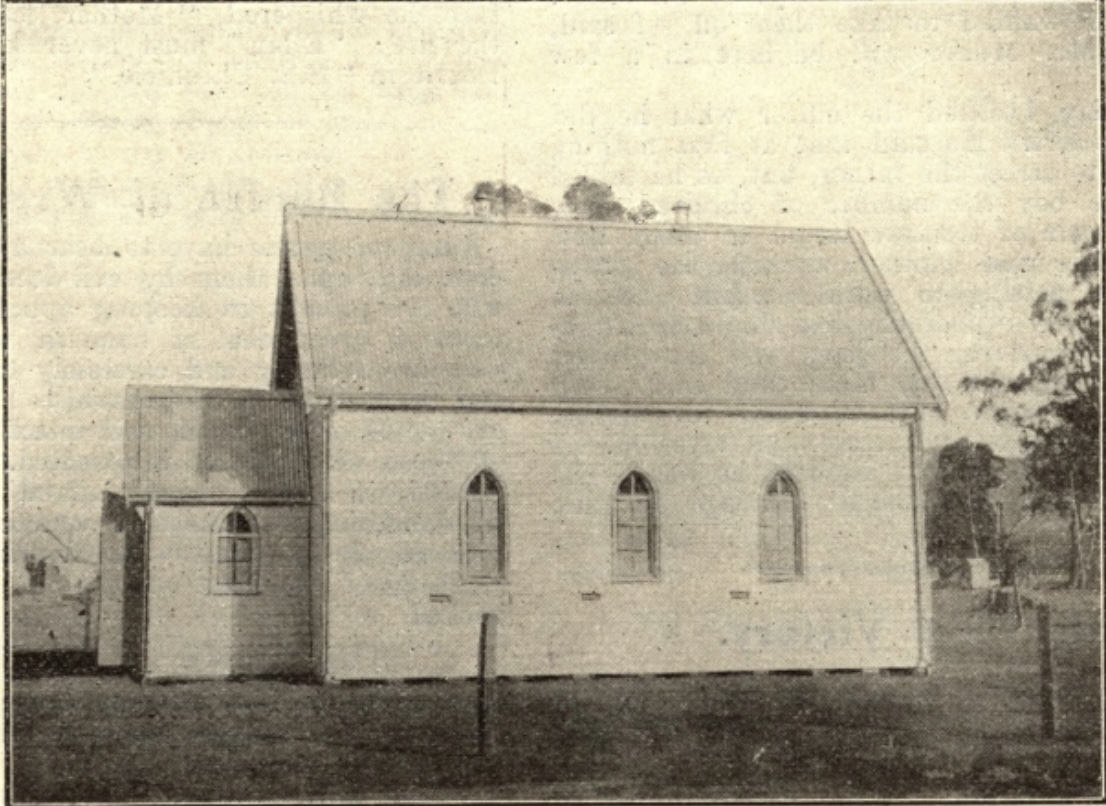
- Eurobin Presbyterian Church (1910)
- Eurobin Presbyterian Church
- Location: Eurobin, Victoria, Australia
- Country: Australia
- Denomination: Presbyterian

History
- Status: Decommissioned
- Dedication: 17 April 1910

Architecture
- Functional status: Closed and dismantled

Specifications
- Materials: Wood, iron roof

The Eurobin Presbyterian Church (St. John’s) was a wooden church located in Eurobin, Victoria, Australia. It was established as part of the Bright (Myrtleford) charge under the Presbytery of Beechworth and later the Presbytery of North East. Though no longer standing, the church holds historical significance as one of two churches in the small township of Eurobin, alongside St. Clement's Church of England.

== History ==
The Eurobin Presbyterian Church was officially dedicated on 17 April 1910, just six weeks after the consecration of St. Clement’s Church of England in the same village. The event attracted a large congregation, including visitors from Bright, many of whom were members of the choir at St. Andrew's Presbyterian Church in Bright. Two services were held that day: the dedication service in the afternoon, led by the Reverend R. Jones, and an evening service. The Reverend J. Hall Angus from St. Paul’s, Wangaratta, gave the sermon at the dedication, preaching from Exodus 40:33–34: "So Moses finished the work. Then a cloud covered the tent of the congregation, and the glory of the Lord filled the Tabernacle."

== Construction ==
The church was constructed of wood, with a total floor area of 520 square feet. It included a porch measuring 8' x 6'6" and a wooden platform furnished by the Reverend J. Hall Angus. The centrepiece of the interior was a handsome wooden pulpit dedicated to Angus’s late wife. This pulpit, later restored, now resides at St. Clement’s Church Eurobin, located 2 km from its original site directly opposite Eurobin railway station.

== Later years ==
In 1918, the church was painted by Mr J.T. Moore of Myrtleford, noted in the Myrtleford Mail & Whorouly Witness as "in his usual capable manner."

However, by the early 1960s, the church had fallen out of use. A Church Statistical Return for 1963 noted that the building was "not in use" and might be moved. The General Assembly of the Presbyterian Church of Victoria approved the sale of the building, with proceeds earmarked for the expansion of the Bright/Myrtleford congregation’s Sunday School Hall.

== Vandalism ==
On 6 September 1910, a letter to the editor in the Ovens and Murray Advertiser detailed vandalism at the church, reporting damage to trees and shrubs planted around the property.

== Legacy ==
Though the building no longer stands, the pulpit from the Eurobin Presbyterian Church continues to hold historical and emotional significance, having been restored and relocated to St. Clement’s Church Eurobin.

== Gallery ==
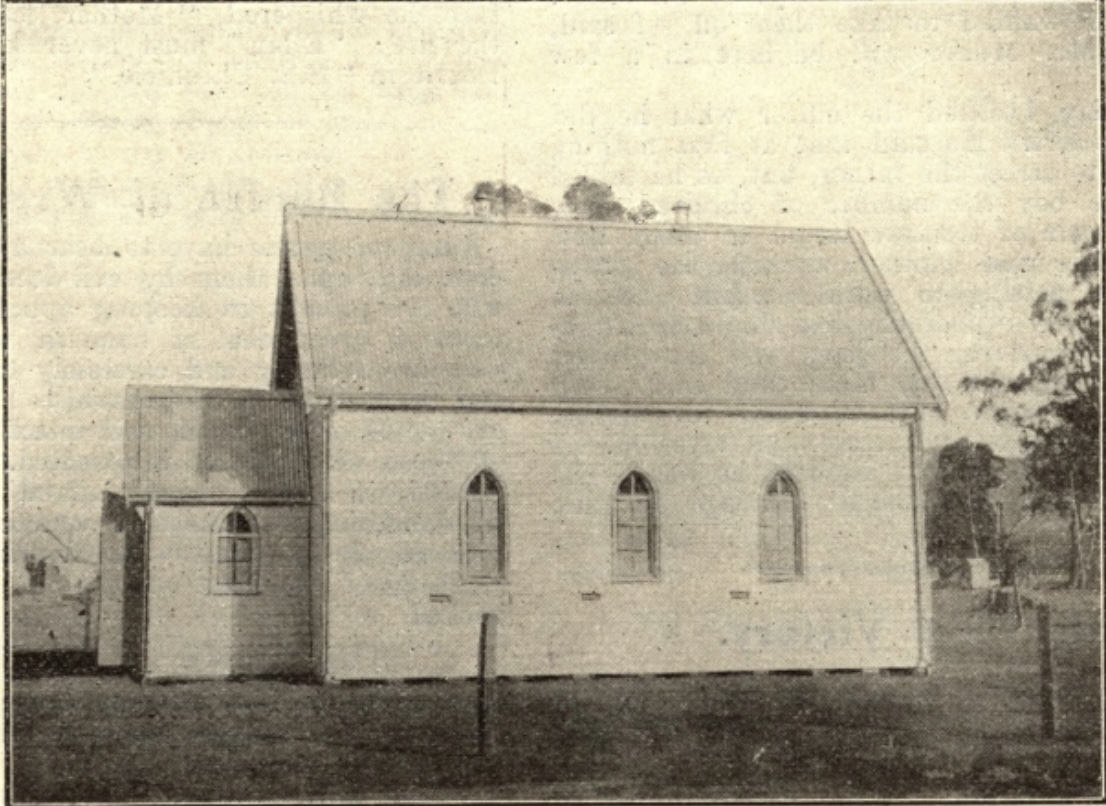
Presbyterian Church, Eurobin (1910)

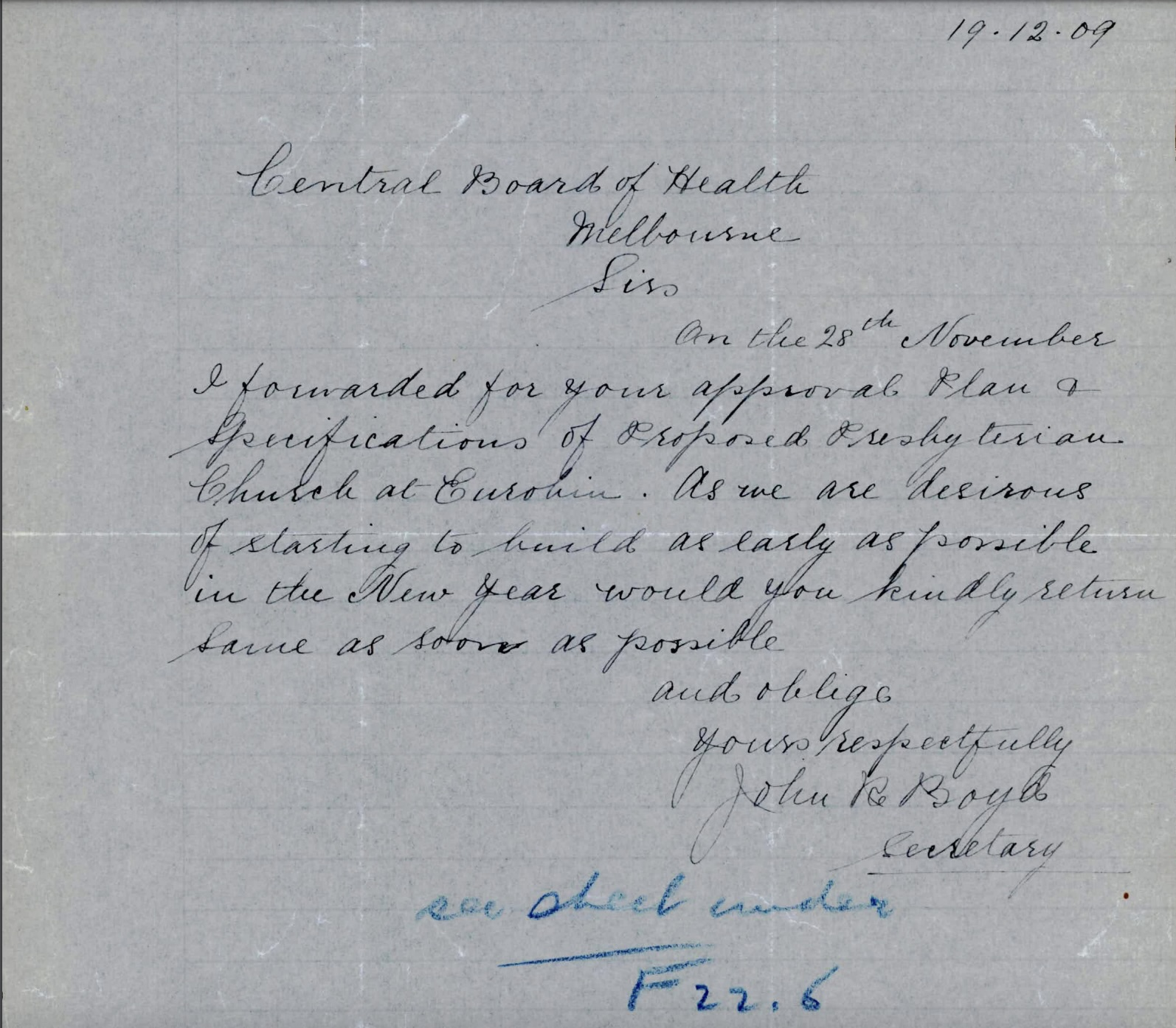
Letter to Board of Health regarding proposed construction

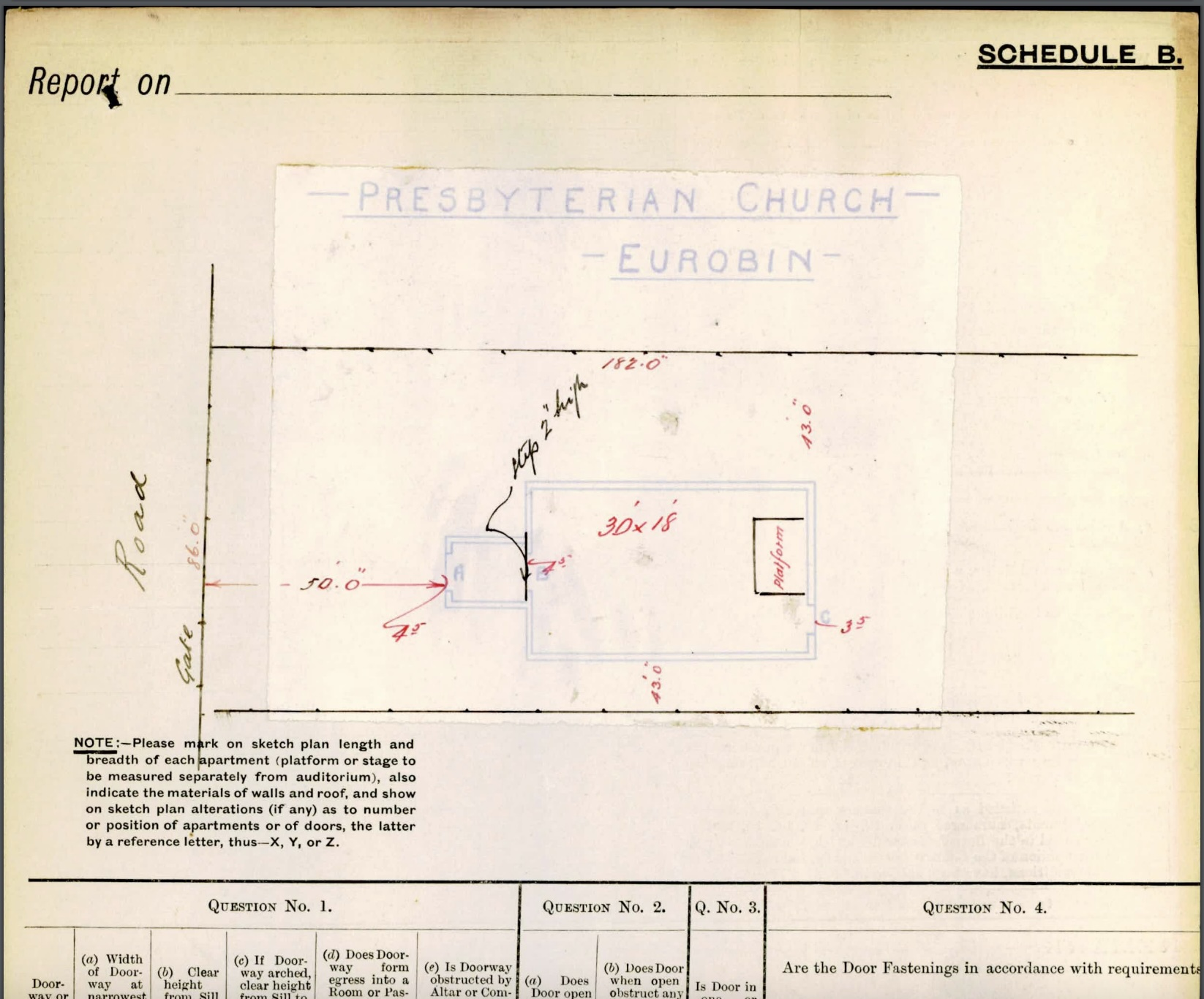
Extract from building plans

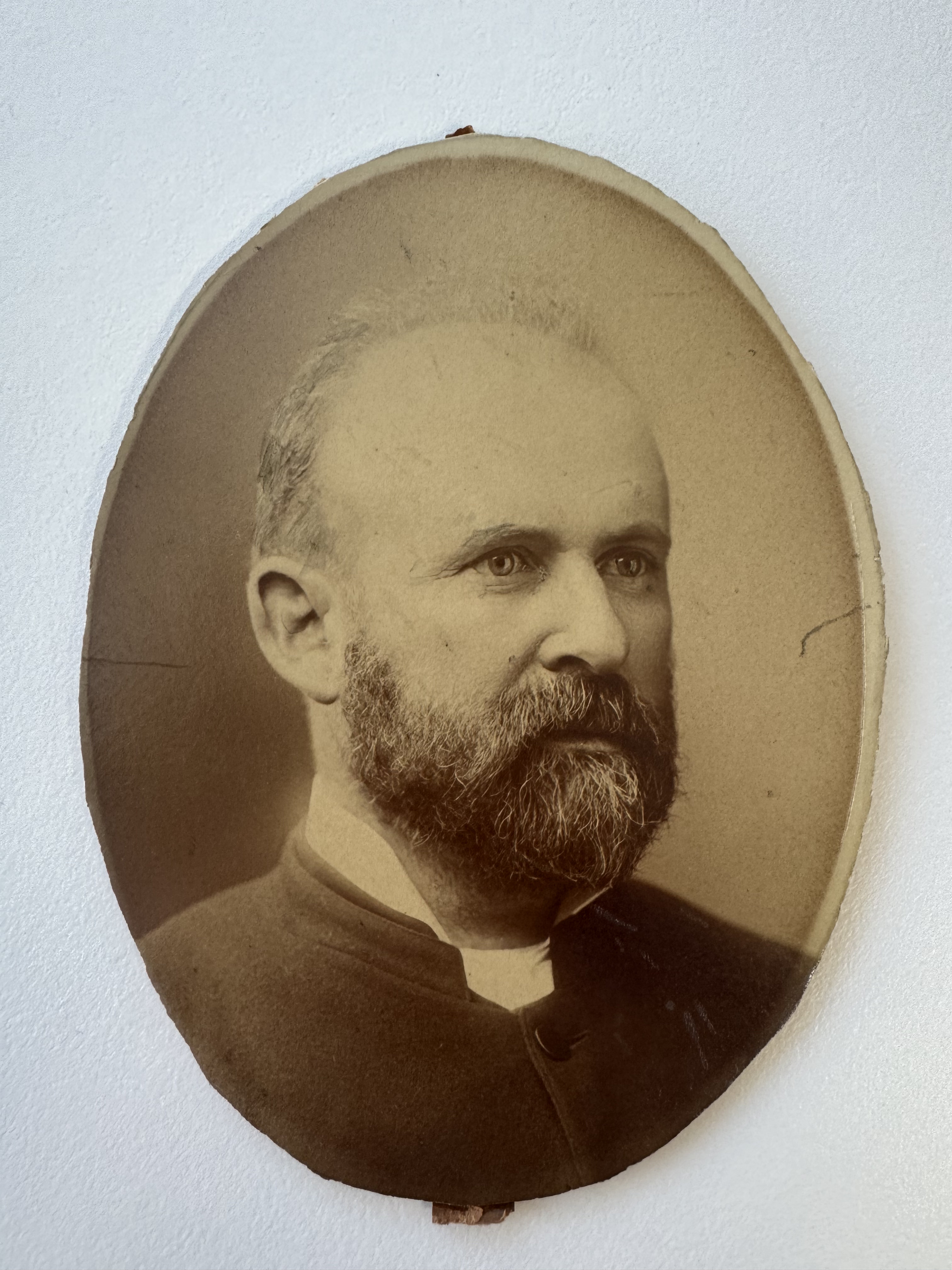
The Reverend John Hall Angus (Presbyterian Church of Victoria archives)
