= Porepunkah =

- Town
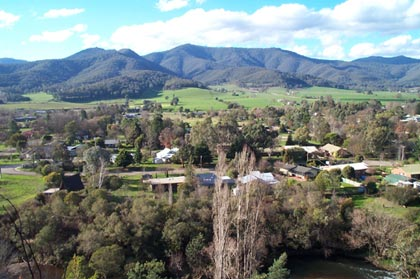
- Porepunkah

- Interactive map of Porepunkah
- Coordinates: 36°41′0″S 146°54′0″E
- Country: Australia
- State: Victoria
- Region: Hume
- LGA: Alpine Shire
- Location: 310 km (190 mi) NE of Melbourne; 88 km (55 mi) S of Wodonga; 71 km (44 mi) SE of Wangaratta; 6 km (3.7 mi) NW of Bright

Government
  - State electorate: Ovens Valley
  - Federal division: Indi

Area
  - Total: 71.4 km^{2} (27.6 sq mi)
- Elevation: 280 m (920 ft)

Population
  - Total: 1,024 (2021 census)
  - Density: 14.342/km^{2} (37.14/sq mi)
- Postcode: 3740
- County: Bogong
- Mean max temp: 20.7 °C (69.3 °F)
- Mean min temp: 8.2 °C (46.8 °F)
- Annual rainfall: 1,036.9 mm (40.82 in)
Localities around Porepunkah
Eurobin	Havilah	Kancoona
Mount Buffalo	Porepunkah	Bright
Mount Buffalo	Buckland	Bright

Porepunkah is a town in northeast Victoria, Australia on the Great Alpine Road, at the foot of Mount Buffalo 310 kilometres (193 mi) northeast of the state capital, Melbourne and 6 kilometres (4 mi) northwest of Bright. It is part of Alpine Shire local government area and is on the banks of the Ovens River, near the Buckland River junction. At the 2021 census, Porepunkah had a population of 1,024.

The name is from the former Portpunka pastoral run.

== History ==
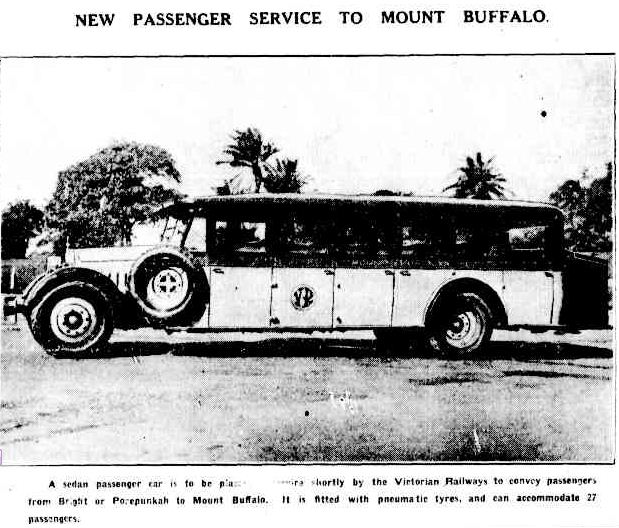
Mount Buffalo sedan car, 1925

European settlement began in the 1830s, but it was not until the discovery of gold in the 1850s that development of the town took place. Porepunkah is the nearest modern township to the site of the Buckland Riot, an anti-Chinese race riot that occurred on 4 July 1857.

The notorious bushranger Harry Power defied police in the Ovens district for a decade. Power held up the mail coach at Porepunkah on 7 May 1869 after escaping from Pentridge Prison.

Porepunkah Post Office opened on 22 February 1870. Although the post office doesn't exist exclusively today, the Porepunkah Roadhouse provides Australia Post services to the community as there is no mail service to homes.

Porepunkah Primary School (No. 1144) was officially opened on 23 January 1873, with Henry Jeffreys as the headmaster and an enrolment of 43 children. The school remains open today.

The Porepunkah Recreation Reserve was gazetted on 11 April 1895. Porepunkah was proclaimed a township on 22 June 1910 by Lord Carmichael, the Governor of Victoria.

Porepunkah railway station was the stopping point for passengers to disembark for Mount Buffalo. In June 1925 a "sedan passenger car" was introduced to transport up to 27 people from the station to the Mount Buffalo Chalet.

On 26 August 2025, two police officers were fatally shot on a rural property in the area, while trying to execute a warrant. The alleged shooter, Dezi Bird Freeman, was a 56-year-old conspiracy theorist and self-proclaimed sovereign citizen. After the shooting, he fled into the Mount Buffalo National Park, initiating a large police search that was at one time the largest tactical police operation in Australia's history. He was shot dead in Thologolong 216 days after the shooting

== Industry ==
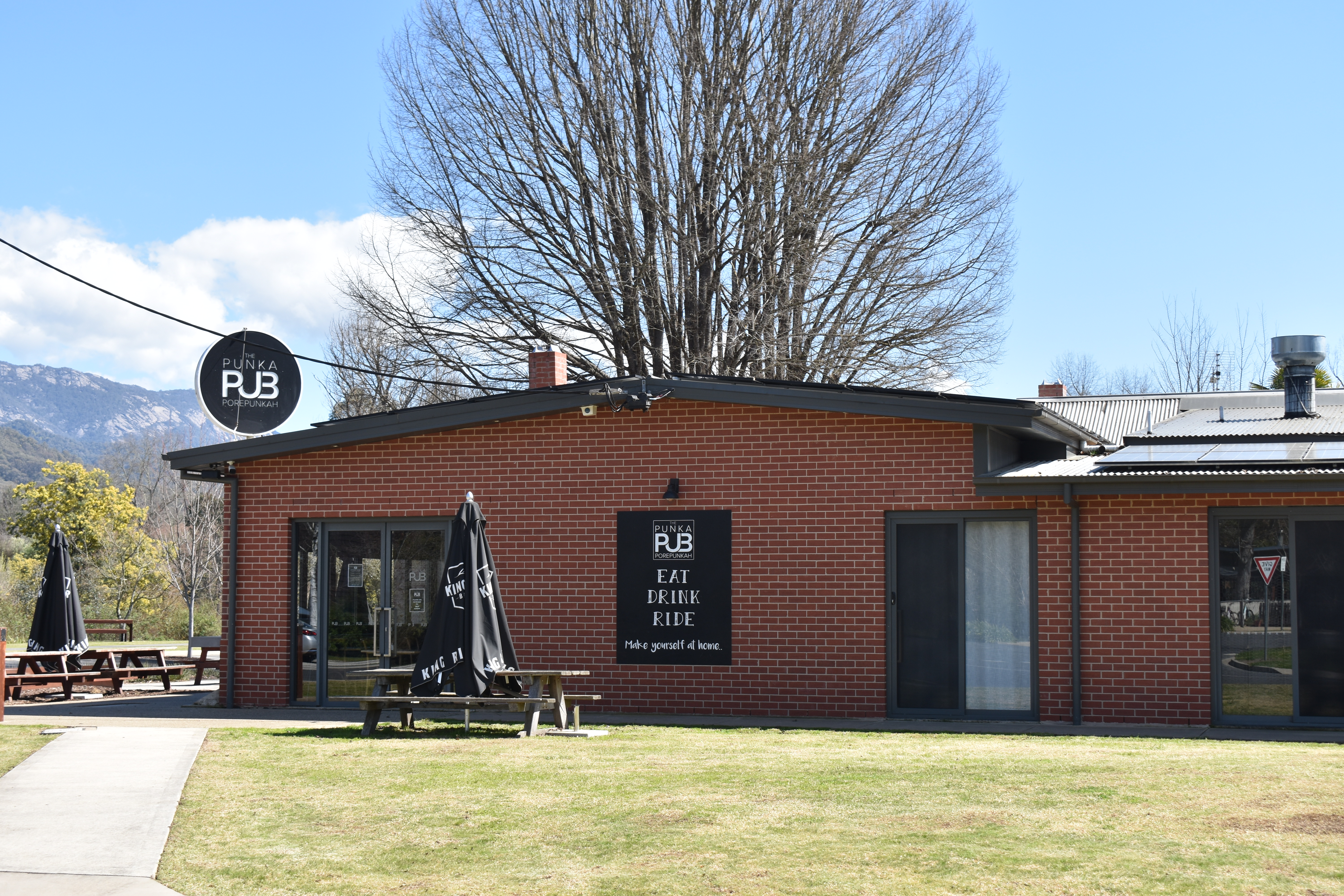
The Porepunkah Pub on the main street of town

Tobacco used to be grown near Porepunkah, but the industry was shut down in 2006. There are hop gardens near Porepunkah towards Eurobin.

There are several vineyards and wineries in the Porepunkah district, which is part of the cool-climate Alpine Valleys wine region. There is one dairy farm in the Buckland Valley operated by the Lumsden family. Bruce Lumsden is an international ploughing competitor.

Nearby softwood plantations provide seasonal employment for thinning, pruning, planting and harvesting.

In the 2016 Census, the most common industries of employment for persons aged 15 years and over usually resident in Porepunkah were accommodation (13.3%); hospitals (7.0%); supermarket and grocery stores (4.8%); cafes and restaurants (4.6%); and local government administration (4.1%).

As there are no health services or local government offices located in Porepunkah, the statistics reflect that it is partly a dormitory town for Bright and Myrtleford.

== Sport ==
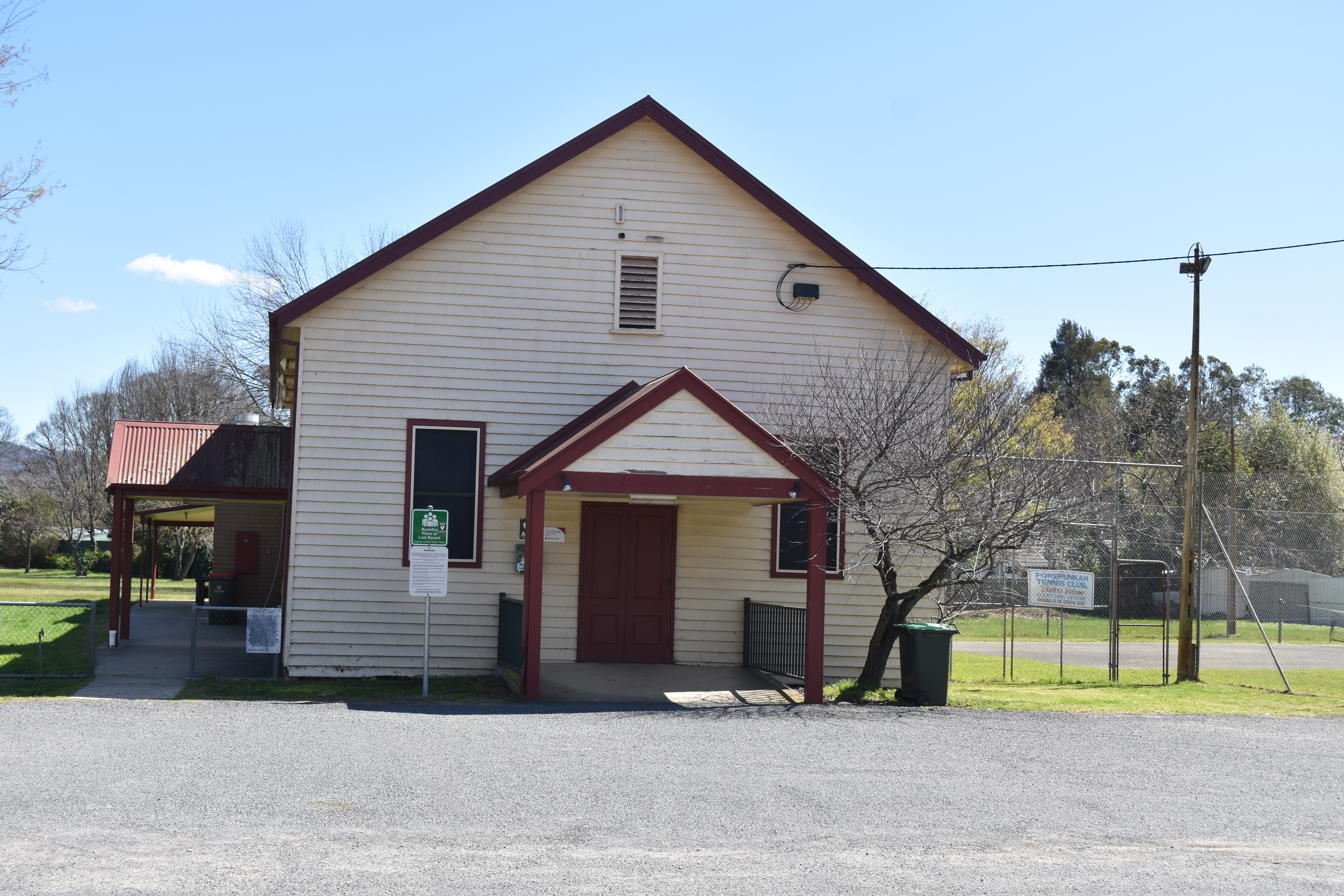
Porepunkah Hall and adjacent tennis courts

Football, cricket and cycling were popular sports at Porepunkah in the early 20th century. Porepunkah teams competed against rivals from Bright and district. Porepunkah competed in the Myrtleford Bright Football League as late as 1951.

On 10 April 1913, The Argus newspaper in Melbourne reported a "country record" of six wickets for one run by Porepunkah bowler John Graham in a match against Wandiligong.

Porepunkah won the 1915 Bright District Football League premiership when the competition was cancelled to aid recruiting for the war as Porepunkah "had a substantial lead from the other clubs".

By 2016, the Porepunkah Panthers baseball team played at the Porepunkah Oval in the North Eastern Baseball Association. There are tennis courts at the Porepunkah Hall.

== Tourism ==
Porepunkah is a leading gateway to the Victorian skifields. The Porepunkah railway station opened in 1890 as part of the Bright railway line, and closed in 1983. The Murray to the Mountains Rail Trail, a popular cycling and hiking path built on this disused railway corridor, passes through Porepunkah. Close proximity to attractions such as Mount Buffalo, Buckland Valley, Porepunkah Airfield and wineries makes Porepunkah a popular holiday destination.

The Ovens and Buckland Rivers are popular with swimmers and fishers. The Buckland River contains mostly brown trout in the headwaters, some small rainbow trout, river blackfish and small redfin in the lower reaches. Spiny freshwater crayfish are also abundant.

== Notable people ==
- Newton Chandler (1893–1997), AFL footballer
- Robert Cook (1867–1930), Country Party politician
- Hugh Coventry (1922–2006), AFL footballer
- Daisy Pearce (born 1988), retired AFLW footballer
- Dezi Freeman (1968/1969-2026)

== See also ==
- Porepunkah police shootings
