= Buckland River (Victoria) =

Buckland East Buckland, West Buckland
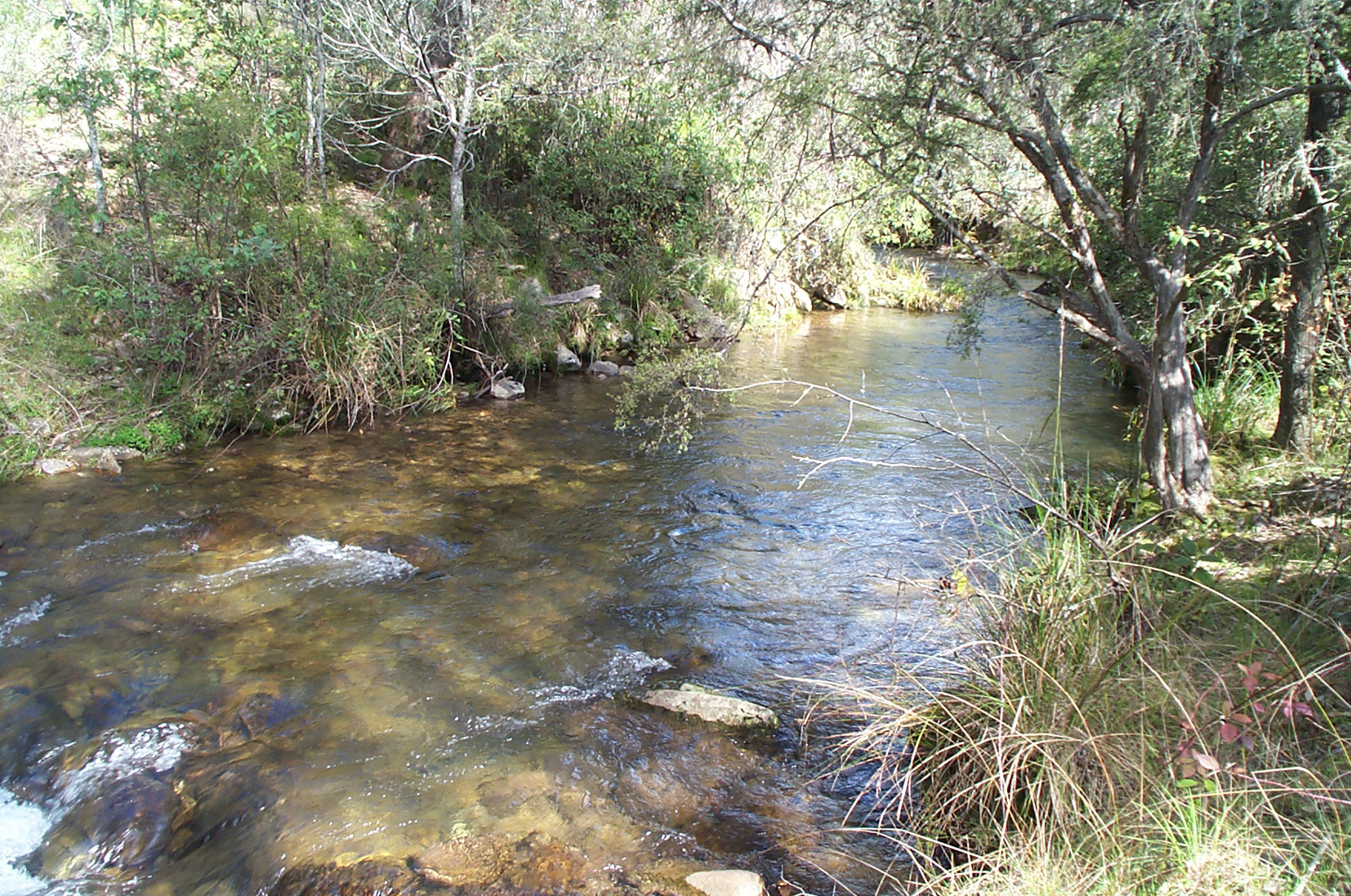
- The Buckland River at Beveridges Station, in the Mount Buffalo National Park

- Location of the Buckland River mouth in Victoria

Location
- Country: Australia
- State: Victoria
- Region: Victorian Alps (IBRA), Victorian Alps
- Local government area: Alpine Shire
- Town: Porepunkah

Physical characteristics
- Source: Buffalo Range, Victorian Alps
- Source confluence: East and West branches of the Buckland River
  - location: below The Twins
  - coordinates: 36°57′40″S 146°55′53″E
  - elevation: 556 m (1,824 ft)
- Mouth: confluence with the Ovens River
  - location: Porepunkah
  - coordinates: 36°41′28″S 146°53′55″E
  - elevation: 274 m (899 ft)
- Length: 39 km (24 mi)
- Basin size: 322 km^{2} (124 sq mi)

Basin features
- River system: North-East Murray catchment, Murray–Darling basin
- Tributaries
  - left: Dingo Creek, Buckland Creek, Fairley Creek, Murray Creek, Dunphy Creek, Wright Creek
  - right: Pheasant Creek, Clear Creek
- National parks: Alpine National Park; Mount Buffalo National Park

The Buckland River, a perennial river of the North-East Murray catchment of the Murray–Darling basin, is located in the Alpine region of Victoria, Australia. It flows from the eastern slopes of the Buffalo Range in the Australian Alps, joining with the Ovens River at Porepunkah.

== Location and features ==
Formed by the east and west branches of the river, the headwaters of the Buckland River rise in the Barry Mountains below Mount Selwyn and The Twins at an elevation exceeding 1,000 metres (3,300 ft) above sea level. The east and west branches of the river reach their confluence upstream of Beveridges Station, where the watercourse becomes Buckland River. The river flows generally north, much of its course through the remote Mount Buffalo National Park, joined by eight minor tributaries, before reaching its confluence with the Overs River near the small settlement of Porepunkah, located within the Alpine Shire. The river descends 282 metres (925 ft) over its 39-kilometre (24 mi) course.

The catchment area to the off-take weir at the Buckland Bridge is approximately 322 square kilometres (124 sq mi). It is about 13 kilometres (8.1 mi) wide by 31 kilometres (19 mi) long, with the longer axis lying approximately north-south. The whole catchment is within the Alpine Shire and the Parishes of Buckland, Coolungubra, Harrietville, Maharatta, Morockdong, Panbullu and Towamba of the County of Delatite. The catchment was proclaimed by the Governor of Victoria, Sir Henry Winneke, on 20 June 1979.

=== Flooding ===
The Buckland River frequently floods. The Bureau of Meteorology has established automated river height monitoring at Upper Buckland and Harris Lane. Rainfall may increase in the range of 1,100–1,640 millimetres (43–65 in) due to the influence of elevation and topography. During the winter months most of the catchment with elevations above 1,500 metres (4,900 ft) AHD receives its precipitation as snow, and in a normal winter, snow accumulates from June until September. A flash flood in the Buckland River following the bushfires in the summer of 2003 resulted in a major fish kill in the Ovens River and threatened town and rural water supplies.

=== Physiography ===
The catchment lies on the northern slopes of the Great Divide, and ranges in elevation from 350 metres (1,150 ft) at the off-take to 1,703 metres (5,587 ft) at The Twins. Most of the catchment is steep to very steep being the foothills of the Victorian Alps. There is an overall similarity of hill slopes in an area of physiographically massive rocks. Along the Buckland River rolling to hilly valley slopes prevail with narrow terraces and a narrow flood plain present in the lower reaches.

== Geology ==
The major part of the catchment consists of generally fine grained felspathic sandstone beds up to one metre thick interbedded with dark grey shale and siltstone of Middle to Upper Ordovician age. There is a small area of intrusive rock of Devonian age consisting of granite and granodiorite near Paddys Hill and a larger area of similar material of Silurian age at Mount Selwyn. Along the middle reaches of the Buckland River there are alluvial and colluvial deposits of Pleistocene age consisting of clay, silt, sand, gravel and conglomerate. Recent deposits of alluvium with a similar composition extend along the river channel for about 2.5 km upstream of the Buckland Bridge.

== Gold rush ==
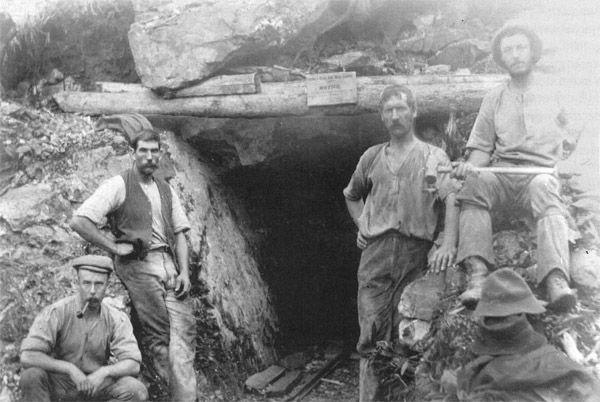
Miners at Fairleys Creek, Buckland Valley

During the Victorian gold rush of the 1850s the Buckland Valley was home to several thousand Chinese miners. On 4 July 1857, following a meeting at a Buckland Valley public house, approximately 100 European miners violently expelled most Chinese miners from the area in an event referred to as the Buckland Riot. The Buckland River was rich in alluvial gold and was dredged extensively in the 19th century. Tributaries also yielded rich results.

In April 1897 crushing machinery was placed on the ground at Fairleys Creek with £30,000 working capital from London-based investors. The 30–head battery was the largest set up on any of the Upper Ovens goldfields. In November 1898 it was reported that crushing had been carried out continuously ... the stone was of a low yield but reported to be paying handsomely.

== Notable people ==
Alice Manfield was a guide who was born in the Buckland Valley in 1878; called Guide Alice, she became significant in the early days of the white settlement of Mount Buffalo and in the establishment of the Mount Buffalo National Park.

== See also ==
- List of rivers of Australia § Victoria
