= Morses Creek =

Morses
- Location of the Morses Creek mouth in Victoria

Location
- Country: Australia
- State: Victoria
- Region: Victorian Alps (IBRA), Victorian Alps
- Local government areas: Alpine Shire

Physical characteristics
- Source confluence: Buckeye Creek and Nolan Creek
  - location: Victorian Alps
  - coordinates: 36°50′39″S 146°59′21″E
  - elevation: 509 m (1,670 ft)
- Mouth: confluence with the Ovens River
  - location: at Bright
  - coordinates: 36°43′30″S 146°57′47″E
  - elevation: 311 m (1,020 ft)
- Length: 16 km (9.9 mi)

Basin features
- River system: North-East Murray catchment, Murray–Darling basin
- Tributaries
  - left: Klondyke Creek
  - right: Chinaman Creek, Growlers Creek

Morses Creek is a perennial stream of the North-East Murray catchment of the Murray–Darling basin in the Alpine region of Victoria, Australia. It flows from the northern slopes of the Australian Alps west of Harrietville, joining with the Ovens River at Bright.

== Location and features ==
Formed by the confluence of the Buckeye Creek and Nolan Creek, the Morses Creek rises within the Great Dividing Range, at an elevation exceeding 500 metres (1,600 ft) above sea level. The river flows generally north by northwest all of its course through the remote mountains, joined by three minor tributaries, before reaching its confluence with the Ovens River at the town of Bright. The river descends 198 metres (650 ft) over its 16-kilometre (9.9 mi) course.

Bright was originally named Morse's Creek. The name was changed to Bright in 1861 after British statesman John Bright, who lived from 1811 to 1889.

== See also ==
- List of rivers of Australia § Victoria
