= Hugh Coventry =

Australian rules footballer

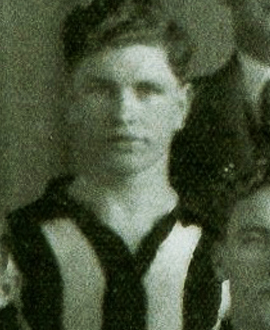
- Coventry in 1941

Personal information
- Full name: Hugh Norman Coventry
- Born: 8 April 1922; Clifton Hill, Victoria
- Died: 21 July 2006 (aged 84); Porepunkah, Victoria
- Original team: Ivanhoe Amateurs
- Height: 179 cm (5 ft 10 in)
- Weight: 78 kg (172 lb)

Playing career^{1}
Years	Club	Games (Goals)
1941	Collingwood	8 (11)
- ^{1} Playing statistics correct to the end of 1941.

Hugh Norman Coventry (8 April 1922 – 21 July 2006) was an Australian rules footballer who played with Collingwood in the Victorian Football League (VFL).

== Family ==
The son of Sydney Alfred Coventry (1899–1976), and Gladys Eileen Coventry (1901–1987), née Trevaskis, Hugh Norman Coventry was born at Clifton Hill on 8 April 1922.

He was the nephew of Gordon Coventry, and was named after another uncle, Hugh Norman "Oak" Coventry (1895–1916), who was (posthumously) mentioned in dispatches for "gallant devotion to duty as volunteer stretcher bearer, carrying the wounded" on 9 August 1916, and had been killed in action while serving with the First AIF in Pozieres,

He married Beth Gradwell at St John's Cathedral in Brisbane on 4 September 1945.

== Collingwood (VFL) ==
He was cleared from Ivanhoe Amateur Football Club in the Victorian Amateur Football Association (VAFA) to Collingwood on 10 June 1940.

== Military service ==
His career was interrupted by World War 2 after playing on the half-forward flank in Collingwood's 1940 Reserves Semi-Final team, and making his debut at 19 in 1941. He was awarded a Distinguished Flying Cross as a Flight Lieutenant.

== Wycheproof (NCFL) ==
In 1952 he was the captain-coach of the Wycheproof Football Club in the North Central Football League (NCFL).
