= Myrtleford railway station =

Former railway station in Victoria, Australia

Coordinates: 36°33′30″S 146°43′23″E

Myrtleford

General information
- Location: Smith Street, Myrtleford; Australia
- Elevation: 209 m (686 ft)
- Owner: Victorian Railways
- Operator: Victorian Railways
- Line: Bright
- Distance: 285.84 kilometres from Southern Cross
- Platforms: 1
- Tracks: 1

Construction
- Structure type: Ground

History
- Opened: 17 December 1883
- Closed: 13 April 1987

Services
Preceding station	Disused railways	Following station
Bowman	Bright line	Ovens
	List of closed railway stations in Victoria	
Location

Myrtleford railway station was located on the Bright line serving the town of Myrtleford in Victoria. It opened on 17 December 1883 as the terminus of the line. On 17 October 1890, the line was extended to Bright. On 30 November 1983 it again became the terminus when the line to Bright closed. It along with the rest of the line closed on 13 April 1987.

The station site is the only former station on the line to have been built over, with a retirement village constructed on the site in the 1990s. There is very little evidence of the former station with the exception of a large tree which was part of the station grounds, and a small plaque acknowledging the history of the site. A small wooden VR portable goods shed is located nearby on Smith Street, adjacent to the "Murray to the Mountains" rail trail.
