= Ovens River =

River in Victoria, Australia

Ovens
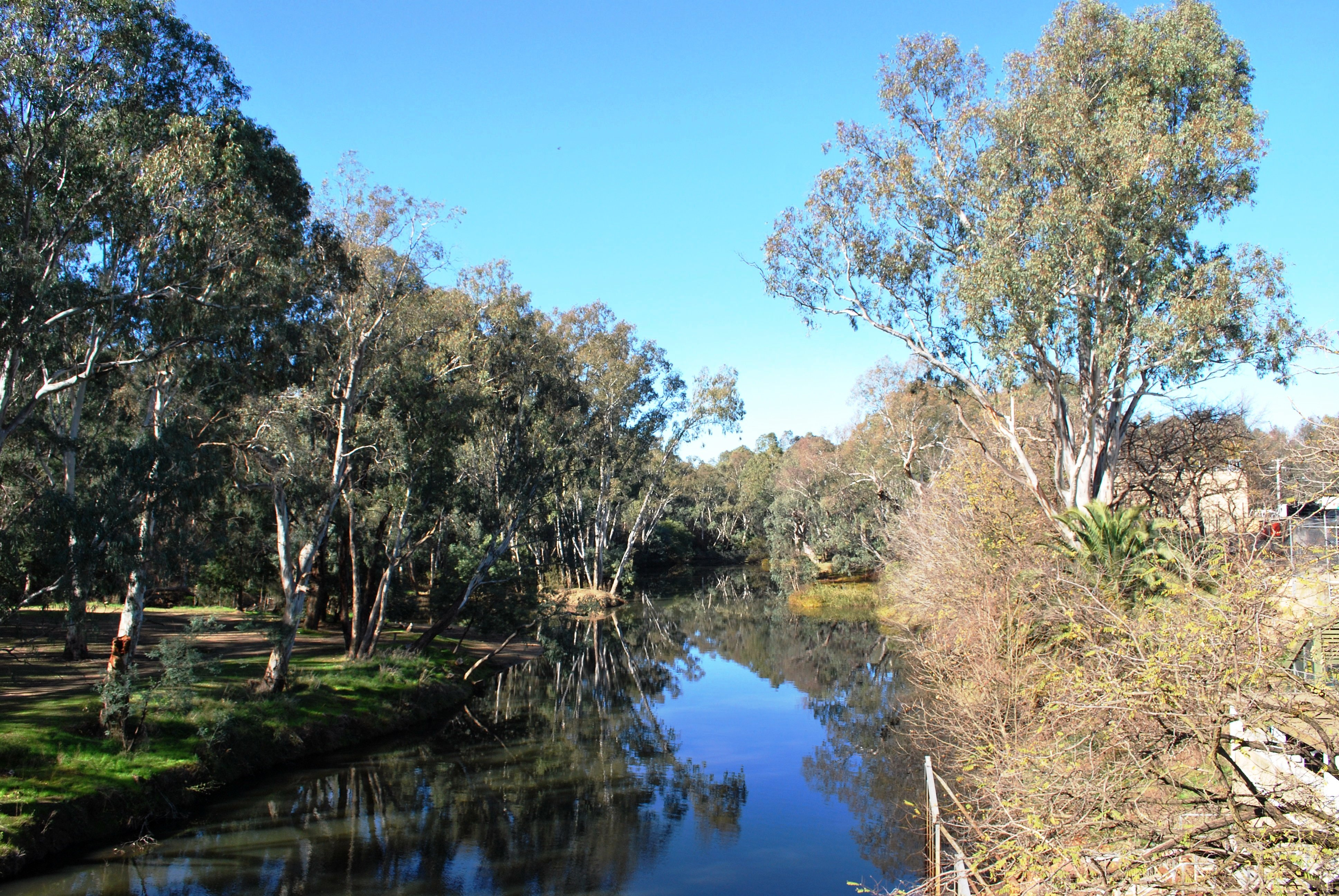
- Ovens River at Wangaratta

- Course of the Ovens River in Victoria
- Etymology: In honour of Major Ovens, the Secretary to Governor Thomas Brisbane
- Native name: Burwang (Pallanganmiddang); Djerrang (Pallanganmiddang)

Location
- Country: Australia
- State: Victoria
- Region: Australian Alps (IBRA), Victorian Alps, Hume
- Local government areas: Alpine Shire, Wangaratta City, Moira Shire
- Towns and cities: Harrietville, Bright, Porepunkah, Myrtleford, Wangaratta

Physical characteristics
- Source: Great Dividing Range
- Source confluence: East and West Branches of the Ovens River
  - location: Harrietville
  - coordinates: 36°53′15″S 147°3′45″E
  - elevation: 529 m (1,736 ft)
- Mouth: confluence with the Murray River
  - location: near Bundalong
  - coordinates: 36°2′15″S 146°10′38″E
  - elevation: 125 m (410 ft)
- Length: 191 km (119 mi)
- Basin size: 7,778 km^{2} (3,003 sq mi)
- Discharge
  - average: 46 m^{3}/s (1,600 cu ft/s)

Basin features
- River system: North-East Murray catchment, Murray-Darling basin
- Tributaries
  - left: Morses Creek, Buckland River (Victoria), Buffalo River (Victoria), King River (Victoria)
- National parks: Alpine NP, Mount Buffalo NP

The Ovens River, a perennial river of the north-east Murray catchment, part of the Murray-Darling basin, is located in the Alpine and Hume regions of the Australian state of Victoria.

== Location and features ==
Formed by the confluence of the East and West Branches of the river, the Ovens River rises in the Victorian Alps, at the settlement of Harrietville, sourced by runoff from high slopes located within the Alpine National Park and the Mount Buffalo National Park. The river flows generally north by west and is joined by eighteen tributaries including Morses Creek at Bright, the Buckland River at Porepunkah, the Buffalo River and then the King River at Wangaratta. The river descends 405 metres (1,329 ft) over its 191-kilometre (119 mi) course. The Great Alpine Road follows much of the course of the river in its upper reaches.

=== Ovens Valley ===
The river flows through the Ovens Valley, which is a popular tourist destination servicing the ski fields of Mount Hotham, Mount Buffalo and Falls Creek, the Alpine National Park and the Mount Buffalo National Park. Air sports such as gliding and paragliding are also practised here, and there is a hedge maze at Wandiligong. A disused railway line has been converted to the Murray to the Mountains Rail Trail, a cycle trail which stretches from Wangaratta and Beechworth to Bright.

There are several wineries in the area, and many hop farms. The wineries are a popular stop for cyclists on their touring rides.

Tobacco was a major industry in the valley until 2006; that year saw the British American Tobacco and Philip Morris companies decide to no longer buy Australian tobacco, and the Federal Government began implementing a plan to transition growers out of this industry. Reminders of the valley's long and prosperous tobacco history continue to dot the valley, such as the many tobacco kilns.

== Etymology ==
Hamilton Hume and William Hovell explored the area in 1824, naming the Ovens River in honour of Major John Ovens, the Secretary to Thomas Brisbane, the Colonial Governor of New South Wales.

In the Aboriginal Waywurru language, the river has two names: Burwang, with no clearly defined meaning; and Djerrang, meaning "leaf".

== List of towns ==
- Wangaratta
- Tarrawingee
- Everton
- Myrtleford
- Ovens
- Bright
- Wandiligong
- Harrietville
- Porepunkah

== See also ==
- List of rivers of Australia § Victoria
- Warby-Ovens National Park

== Gallery ==
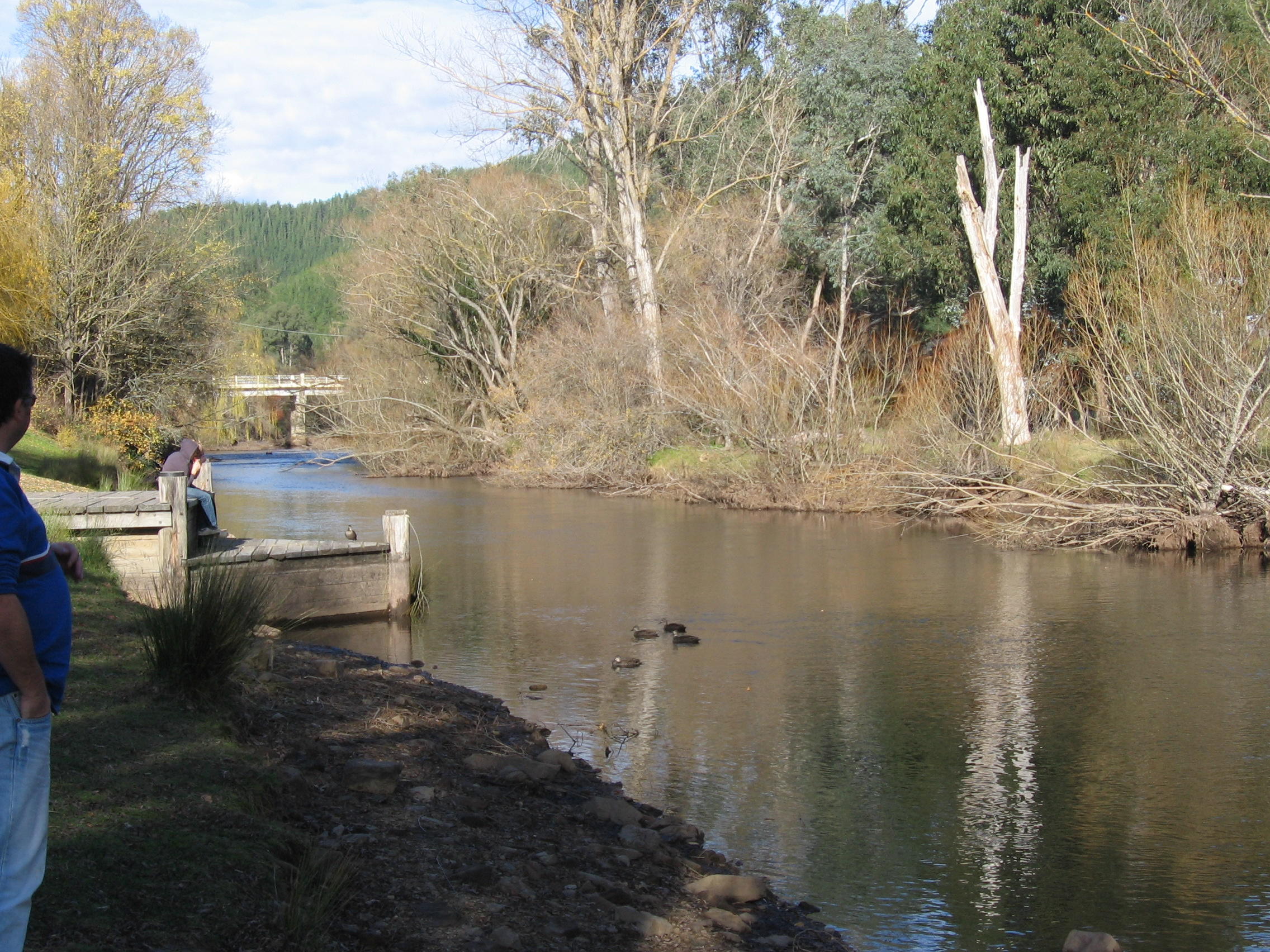
The Ovens River at Porepunkah

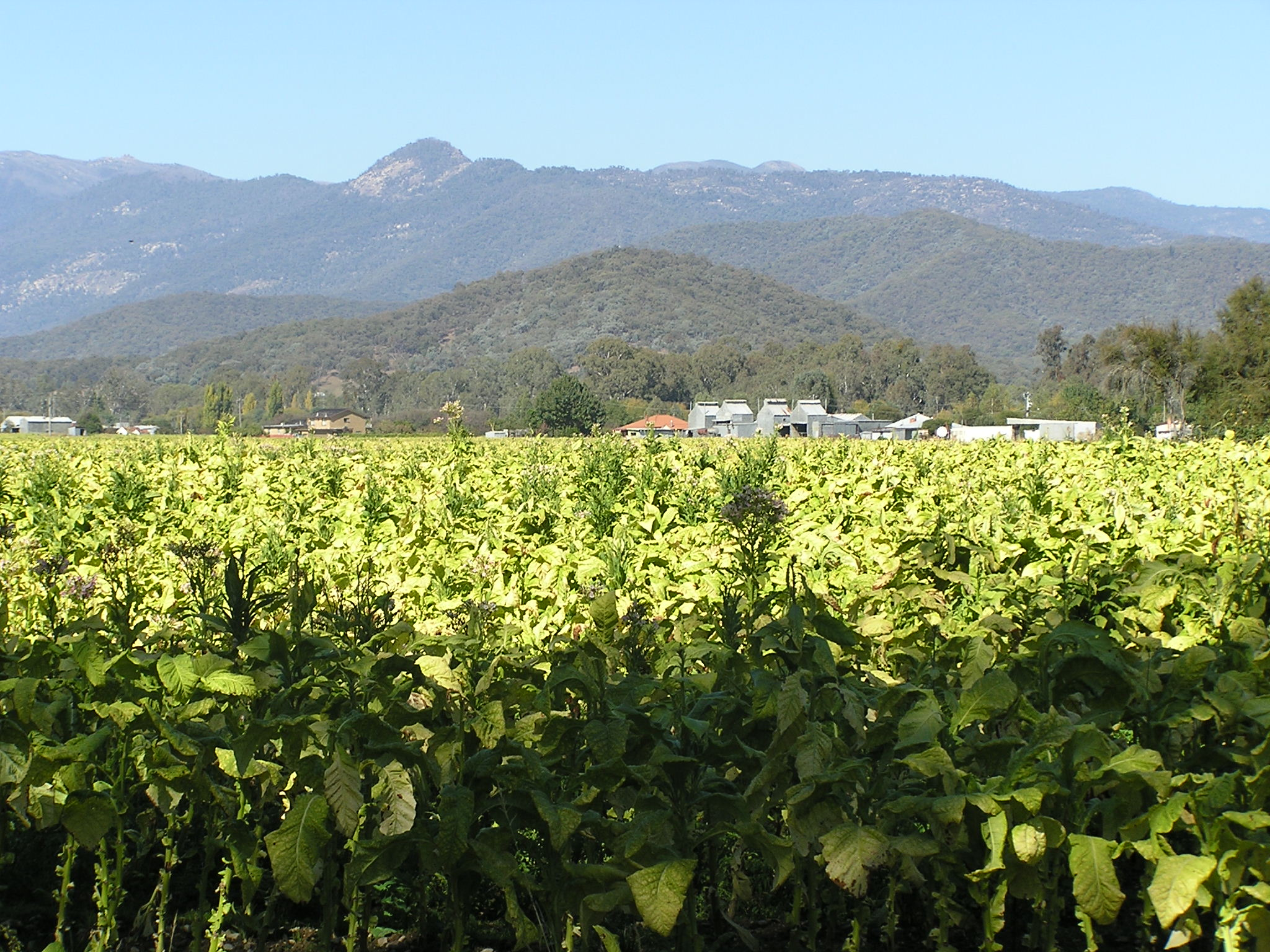
Tobacco crops in the Ovens Valley (2005)

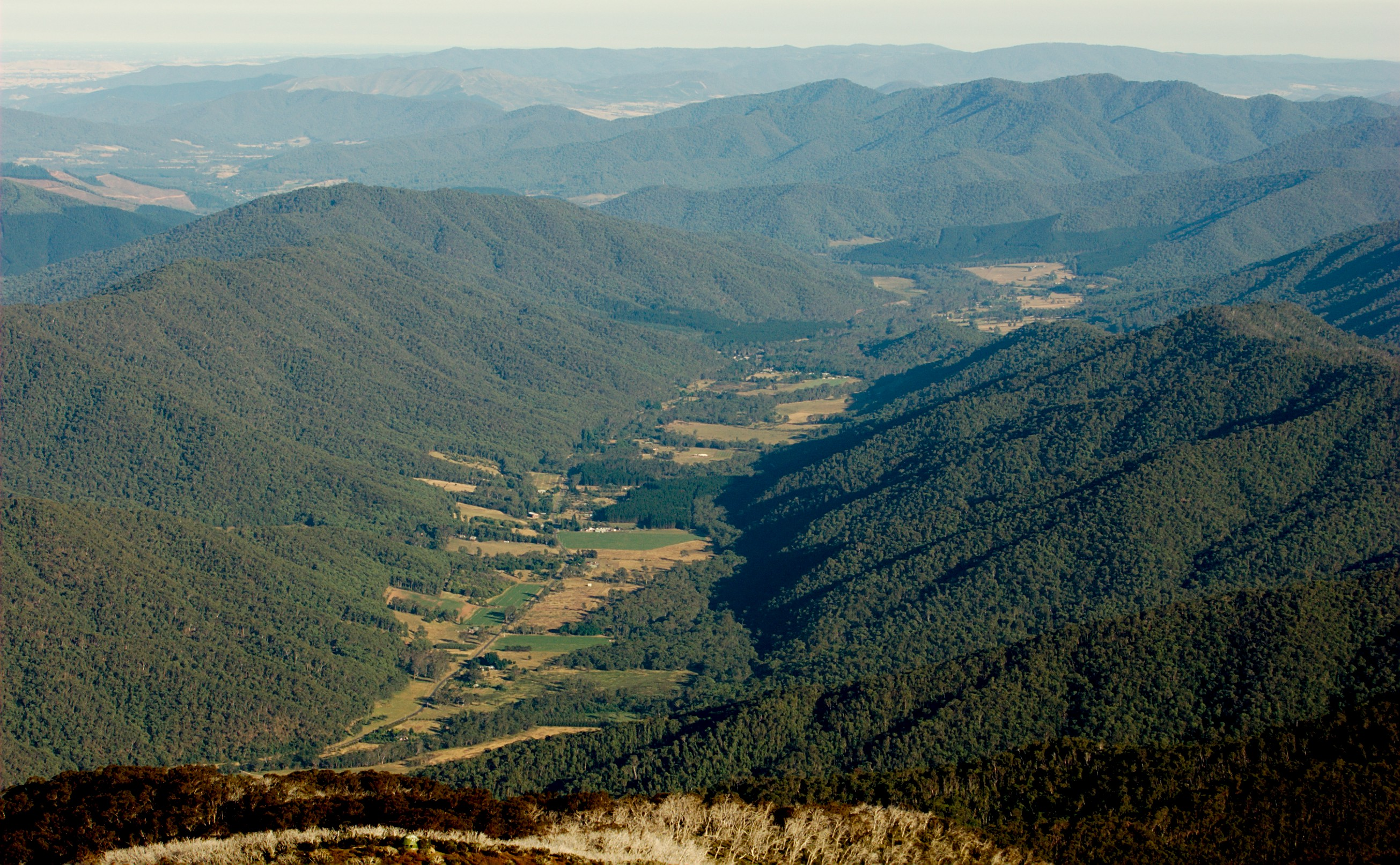
The Ovens Valley, as seen from Mount Feathertop

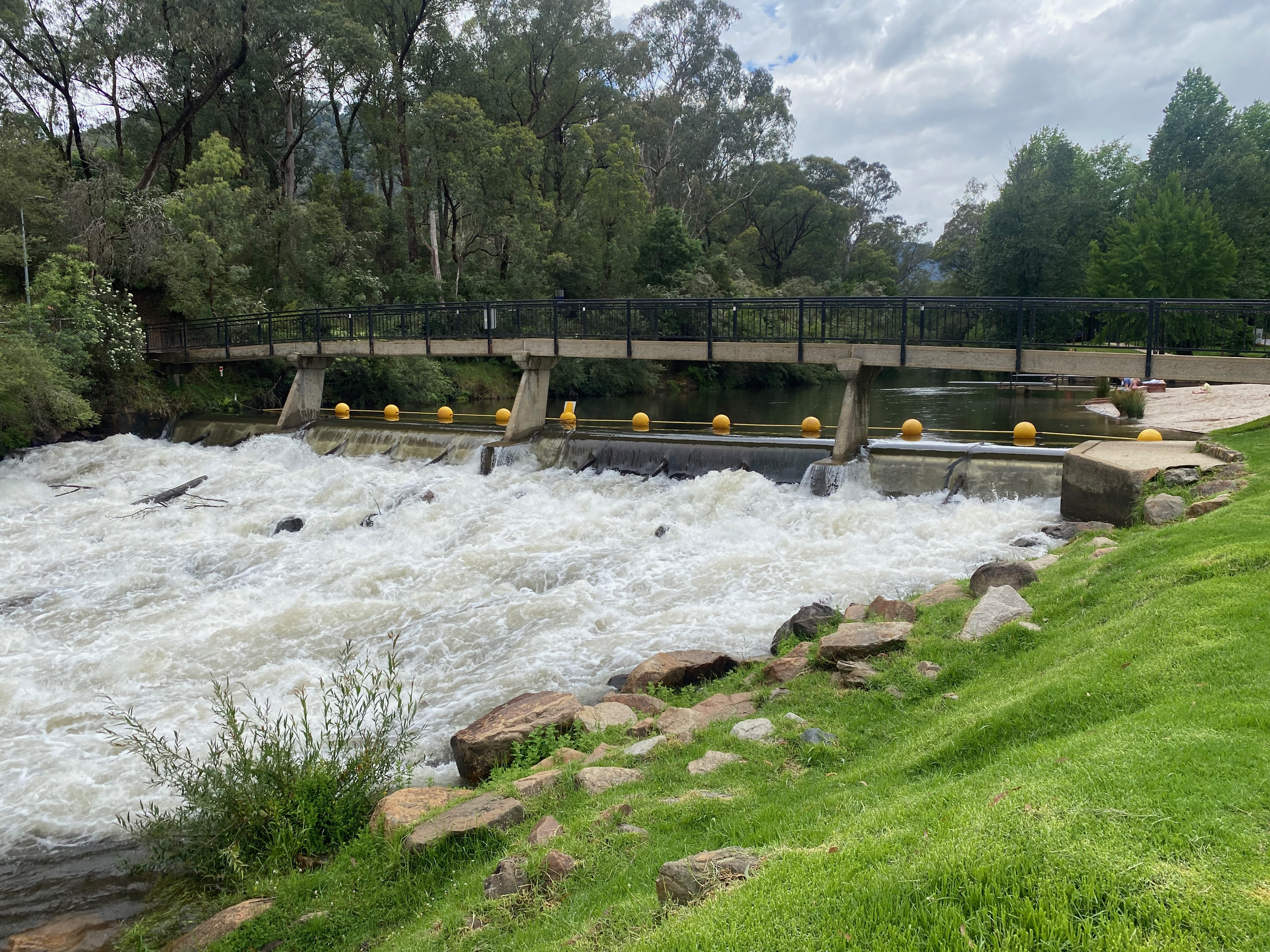
A weir on the river in Bright

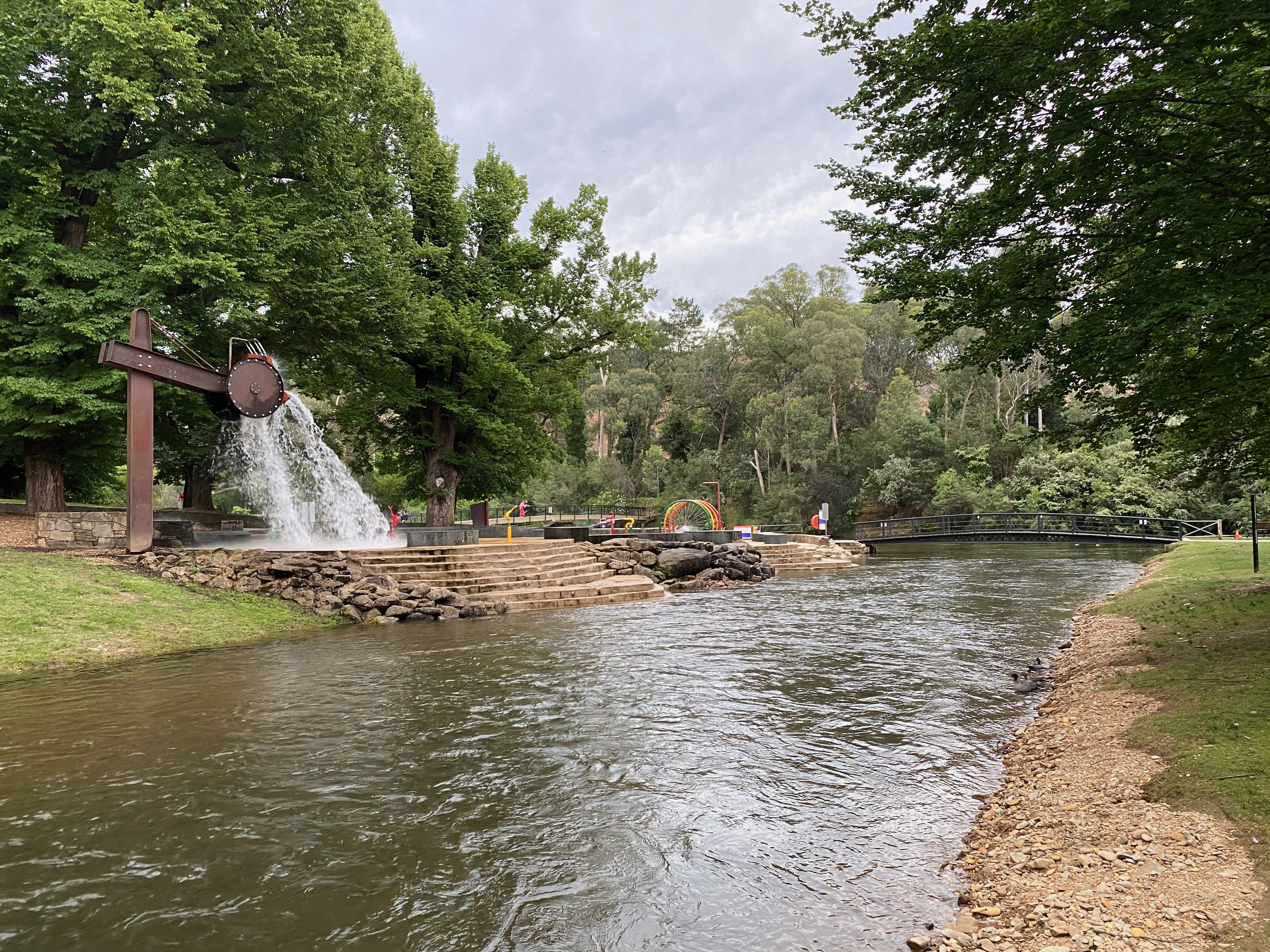
Bright Splash Park is on the Ovens River

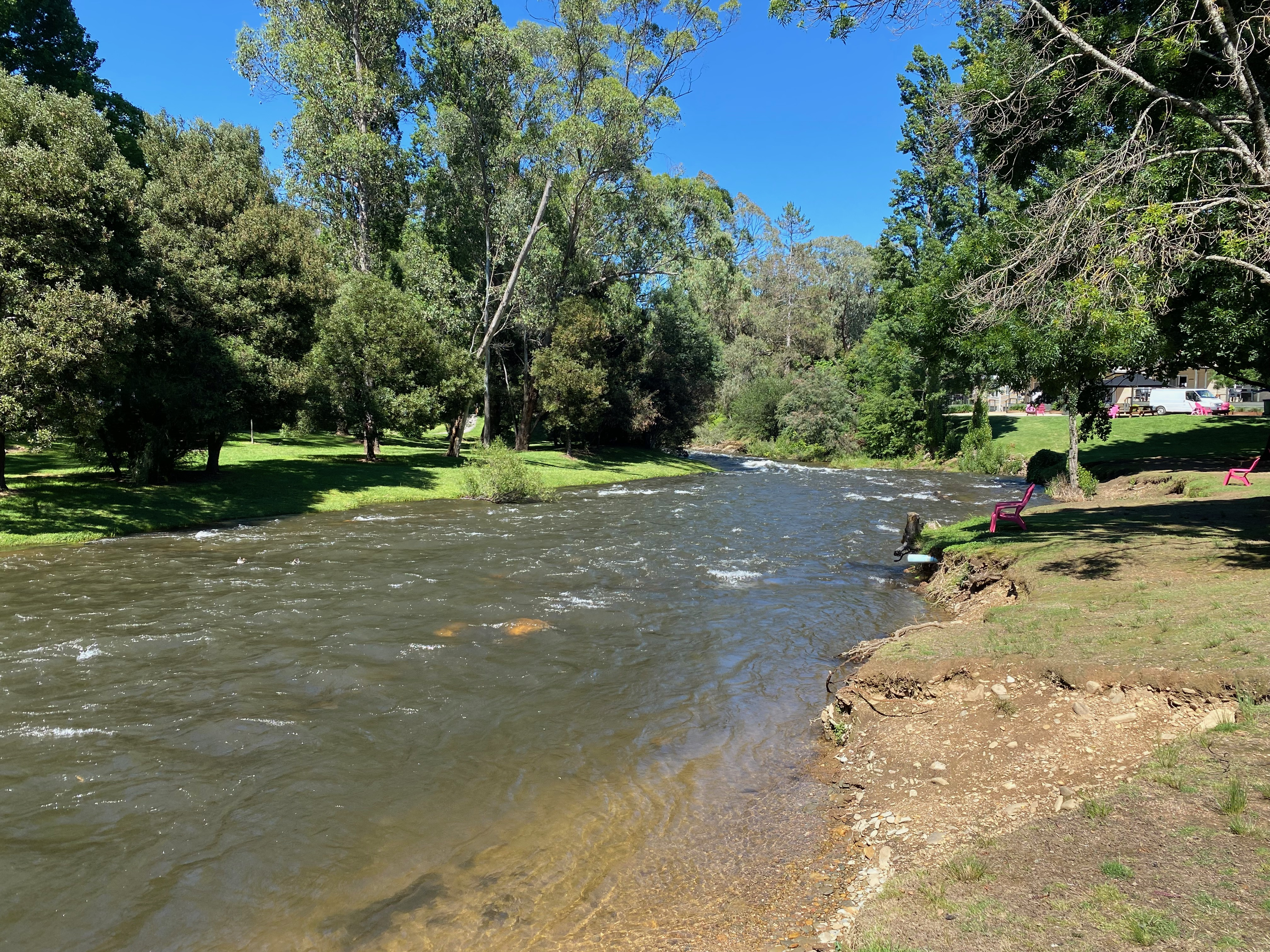
The Ovens River near Bright after significant rainfall
