= Bright railway station =

Former railway station in Victoria, Australia

Coordinates: 36°43′48.91″S 146°57′23.77″E

Bright
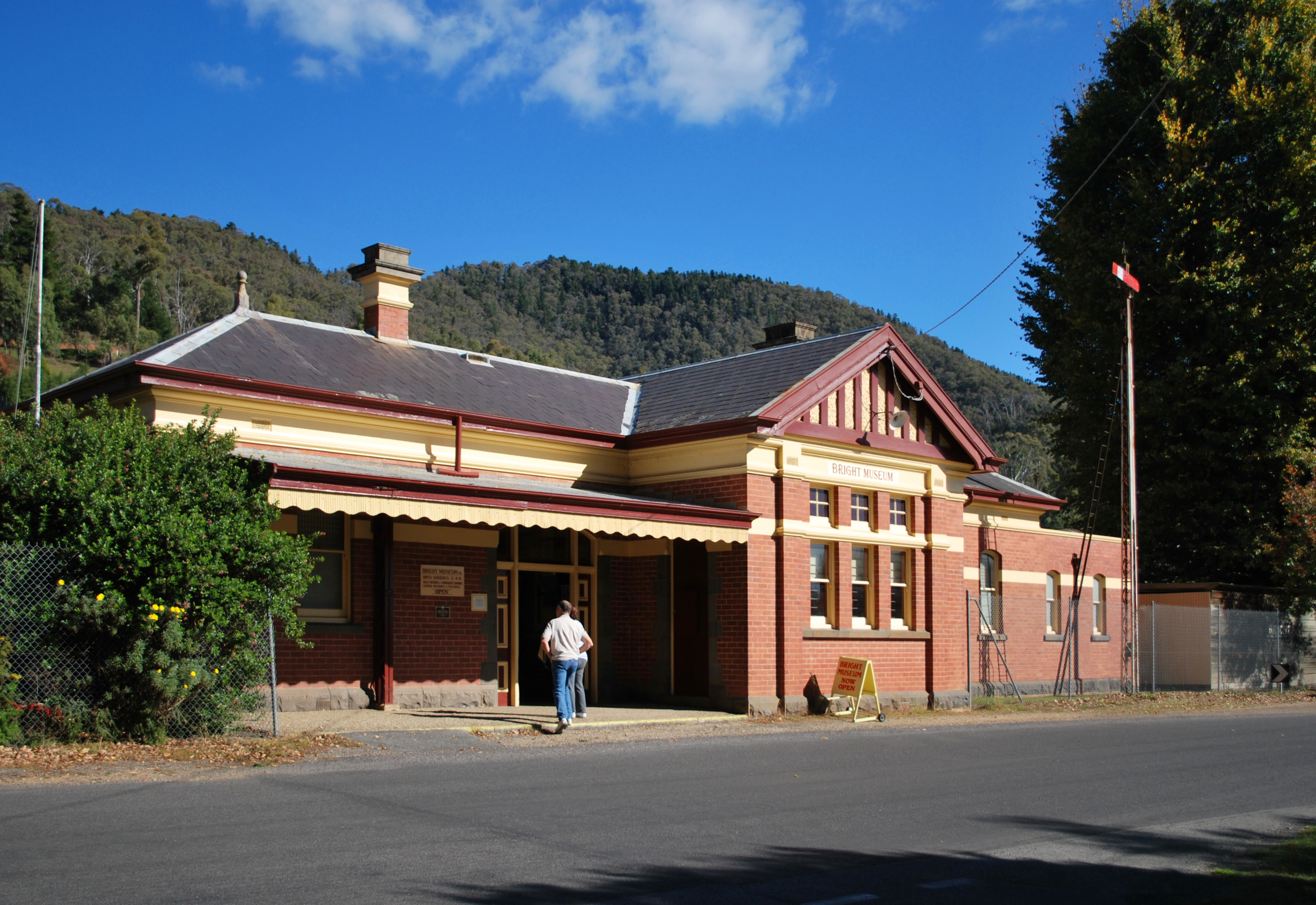
- Station front in April 2012

General information
- Location: Railway Avenue, Bright; Australia
- Elevation: 305 m (1,001 ft)
- Owner: Victorian Railways
- Operator: Victorian Railways
- Line: Bright
- Distance: 315.61 kilometres from Southern Cross
- Platforms: 1
- Tracks: 3

Construction
- Structure type: Ground

History
- Opened: 17 October 1890
- Closed: 30 November 1983

Services
Preceding station	Disused railways	Following station
Porepunkah	Bright line	Terminus
	List of closed railway stations in Victoria	
Location

Bright railway station is the closed terminus station of the Bright line which served the town of Bright in Victoria (Australia). It opened on 17 October 1890 and closed on 30 November 1983.

The former terminus retains a large brick station building and a goods shed. The station platform is still intact with a number of items of Victorian Railways rolling stock sitting on a short section of track fenced in with the station. The station building and grounds are maintained as a local museum. It is now part of the Murray to the Mountains Rail Trail.
