= Eurobin =

- Town
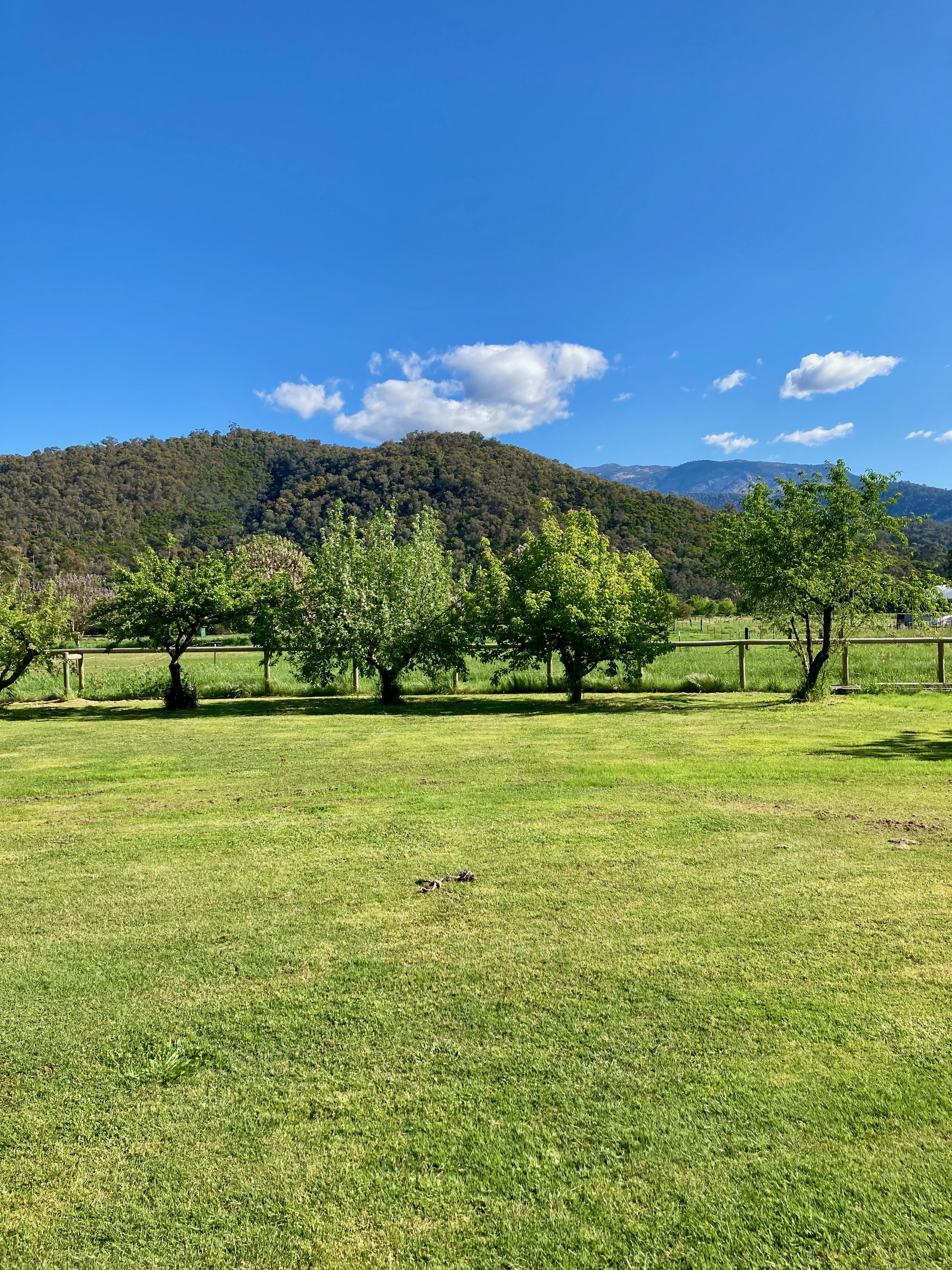
- Photo of rural Eurobin looking south toward Mount Buffalo

- Coordinates: 36.635441°S 146.850960°E
- Country: Australia
- State: Victoria
- Region: Hume
- LGA: Alpine Shire
- Established: 1853
- Elevation: 293 m (961 ft)

Population
  - Total: 239 (SAL 2021)
- Time zone: UTC+10 (AEST)
  - Summer (DST): UTC+11 (AEDT)
- Postcode: 3739
Localities around Eurobin
| Buckland | Myrtleford | Bright |
| Ovens | Eurobin | Porepunkah |
| Buffalo River | Buckland Valley | Freeburgh |

Eurobin is a locality in the Ovens Valley, northeastern Victoria, Australia, situated approximately midway between the towns of Myrtleford and Bright. Known as Black Springs until 1870, it has been claimed that name Eurobin is derived from a word in an unspecified Aboriginal name meaning "lake foot of mountain".

== History ==
The area now known as Eurobin developed as a wayside stop during the Buckland Valley gold rush in 1853. Over the years, Eurobin grew to include essential services and structures, such as a school, Eurobin railway station, post office, Presbyterian Church, and Boyd's Eurobin Hotel.

In 1899, the Ovens and Murray Advertiser described Eurobin during a period of decline: "After a seemingly endless morning tramp, we entered the little township of Eurobin, which looks lonely and worn, resting on its little bit of rising ground. It seemed as if it had known trouble by its remnants of fences, dilapidated and tired-looking houses, and the battered-in windows of the old schoolhouse." That snapshot reflects a time of hardship and transition.

However, Eurobin experienced periods of renewal, as evidenced by the construction of two churches in 1910: St Clement's Church Eurobin, a Church of England establishment, and the St John's Presbyterian Church. Those buildings symbolised a sense of optimism and resilience in the community, showcasing its ability to recover and thrive despite earlier challenges.

Many of the original structures from Eurobin's early days have not survived, and St. Clement's Church is the only remaining community building from that period, holding historical, architectural, and social significance for the area.

== Agriculture and economy ==
Eurobin is one of several agriculturally rich settlements in the Ovens Valley, with farm settlement beginning in the late 1860s. The locality became known primarily for its production of hops, tobacco, and dairy products. In the early 1890s, William Panlook established a successful hop-growing enterprise at Eurobin. Today, the Rostrevor Hop Gardens - now the largest hop farm in the Southern Hemisphere - is located in Eurobin and is owned by Henry Jones IXL (Tasmania) and Carlton & United Breweries.

== Population ==
In 1911, Eurobin had a population of 214. By 2021, the population had increased slightly to 239, with a median age of 50.

== See also ==
- Eurobin railway station
- St Clement's Church Eurobin
- Eurobin Presbyterian Church
