= Murray to the Mountains Rail Trail =

Rail trail in Victoria, Australia

Murray to Mountains Rail Trail
- Length: 95 km
- Location: Victoria, Australia
- Difficulty: Easy to medium
- Hazards: Uncontrolled crossings of major highways
- Surface: Sealed, some sections of compact gravel
- Hills: Small undulating hills; Beechworth branch involves extended climb
- Water: Available in most towns
- Train: Melbourne-Sydney line to start of route at Wangaratta
- Bus: Available in major towns

The Murray to Mountains Rail Trail is a cycling and walking rail trail in northern Victoria, Australia. It extends from Wangaratta to Bright, with a side branch to Beechworth, following the route of the former Bright railway line. This side branch trail is planned to be extended from Beechworth to Yackandandah. AU$12m was budgeted by the Victoria State Government for this extension in May 2017. Unusually for a rail trail, it is sealed for virtually the entire distance of approximately 95 kilometres.

Another section, from Rutherglen to Wahgunyah on the Murray was completed in 2009. There is an on-road "preferred route" connecting Rutherglen to Bowser via Chiltern. A third section extends south from Wangaratta to Oxley, connecting with a bike path from there to Milawa.

== Stages ==
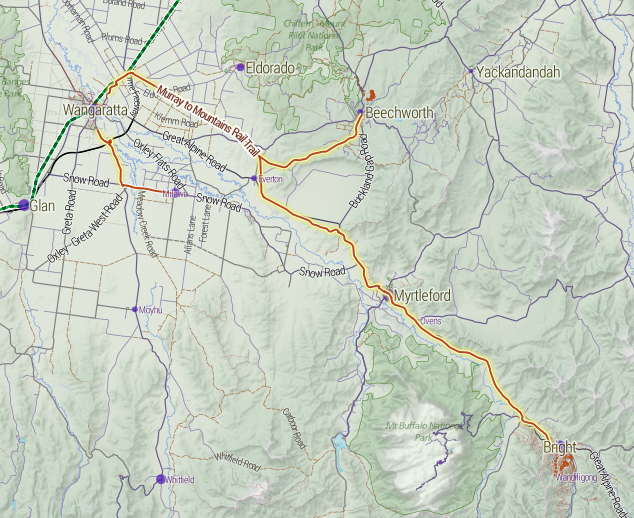
Map of two sections of the rail trail.

Landmarks are as follows:

- Wangaratta
- Bowser (8 km)
- Londrigan former station (3 km)
- Tarrawingee former station (8 km)
- Everton former station (6 km)
  - Beechworth branch:
    - Baarmutha former station (10 km)
    - Beechworth (5 km)
- Everton (1 km)
- Brooksfield former station (5 km)
- Bowman former station (8 km)
- Gapsted former station (6 km)
- Myrtleford (8 km)
- Ovens (5 km)
- St Clements Church (7 km)
- Eurobin (former station) (9 km)
- Porepunkah (8 km)
- Bright (7 km)

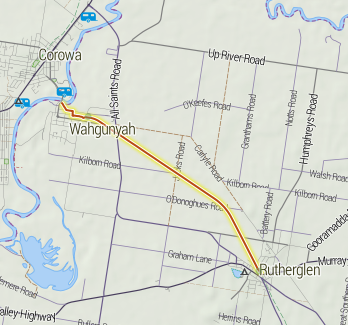
Map of the Rutherglen-Wagunyah section of the Murray to the Mountains Rail Trail.
