= St Clement's Church Eurobin =

Historical building in Australia

St. Clement's Church, Eurobin
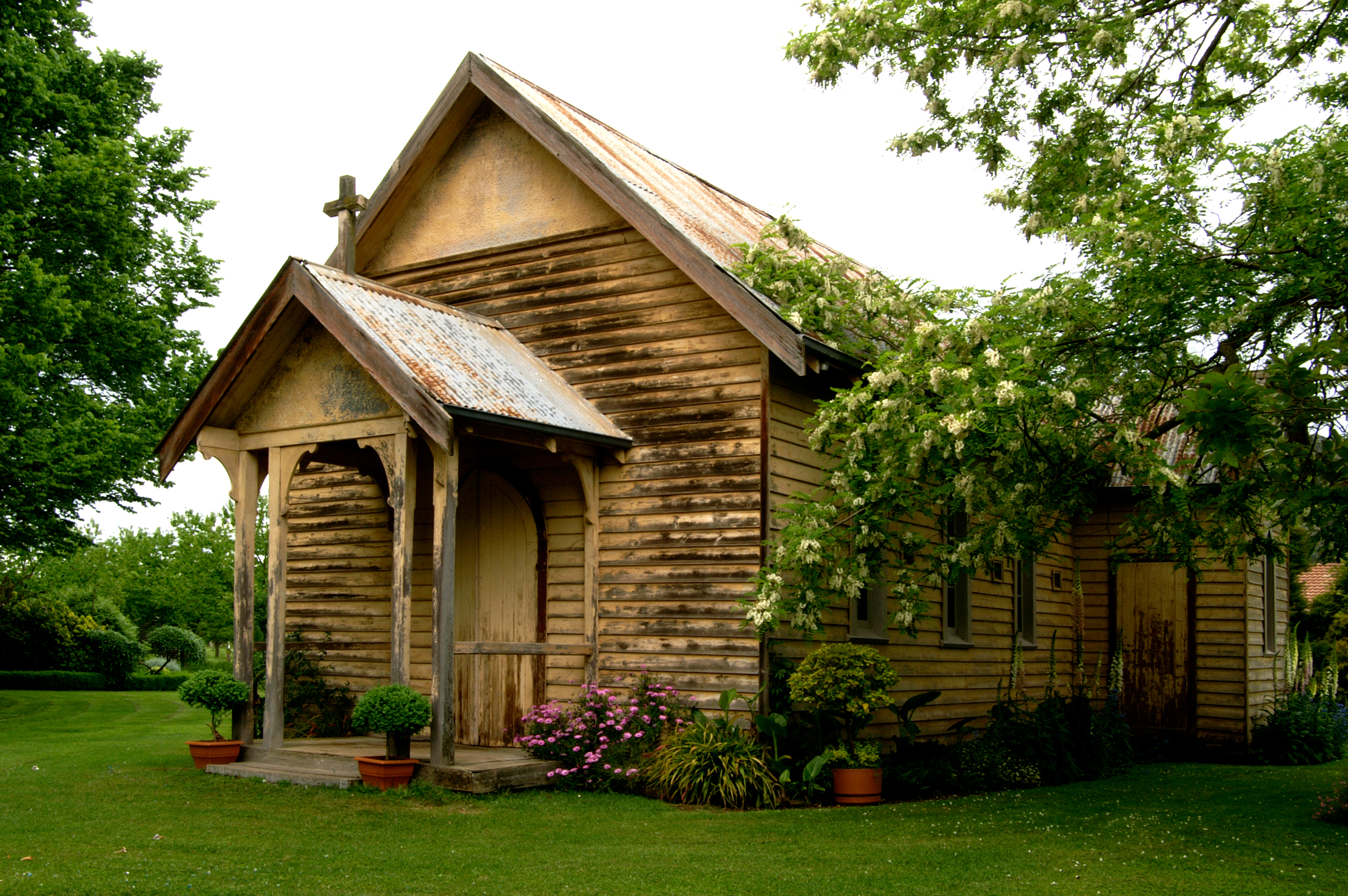
- St. Clement's Church in 2005
- St. Clement's Church, Eurobin
- 36.630554°S 146.846701°E
- Location: 5958 Great Alpine Road, Eurobin, Victoria, Australia
- Country: Australia
- Denomination: Church of England

History
- Status: Deconsecrated
- Dedication: 11 March 1910

Architecture
- Functional status: Heritage site

Specifications
- Materials: Baltic pine, jarrah, cedar, walnut, tin roof

St Clement's Church is a historic former Church of England building located at 5958 Great Alpine Road, Eurobin, Alpine Shire, Victoria, Australia. It is listed as a heritage site by the Alpine Shire Council, and is the only remaining community building in Eurobin.

== History ==
The construction of the church began on 6 February 1910, and was funded by the local residents at an estimated cost of £200. It was dedicated by Bishop Thomas Armstrong (bishop) on 11 March 1910, with the first service held two days later on 13 March 1910 by Reverend James Leslie Watt. and attended by 40 people. The church served as a centre for worship and community events until its final service on 21 March 1971, led by Reverend George Austin Rigby and attended by four people.

Following its deconsecration in 1971, the church and its land remained unused until they were privately purchased by Rupert and Josephine Saines in 1982. In 1986, the Saines family built a brick house on the property, located some distance behind the church. Under their care, the church hosted various community gatherings, including weddings, baptisms, and funerals. After Rupert and Josephine died, the property was sold and the title transferred to the current owner on 22 February 2021.

In April 2024, restoration efforts began to repair significant wood rot, termite damage, and peeling paint on the building's exterior, aiming to restore the church to its former state while observing the heritage overlay requiring the exterior paint to remain in its original colour.

== Architecture and construction ==
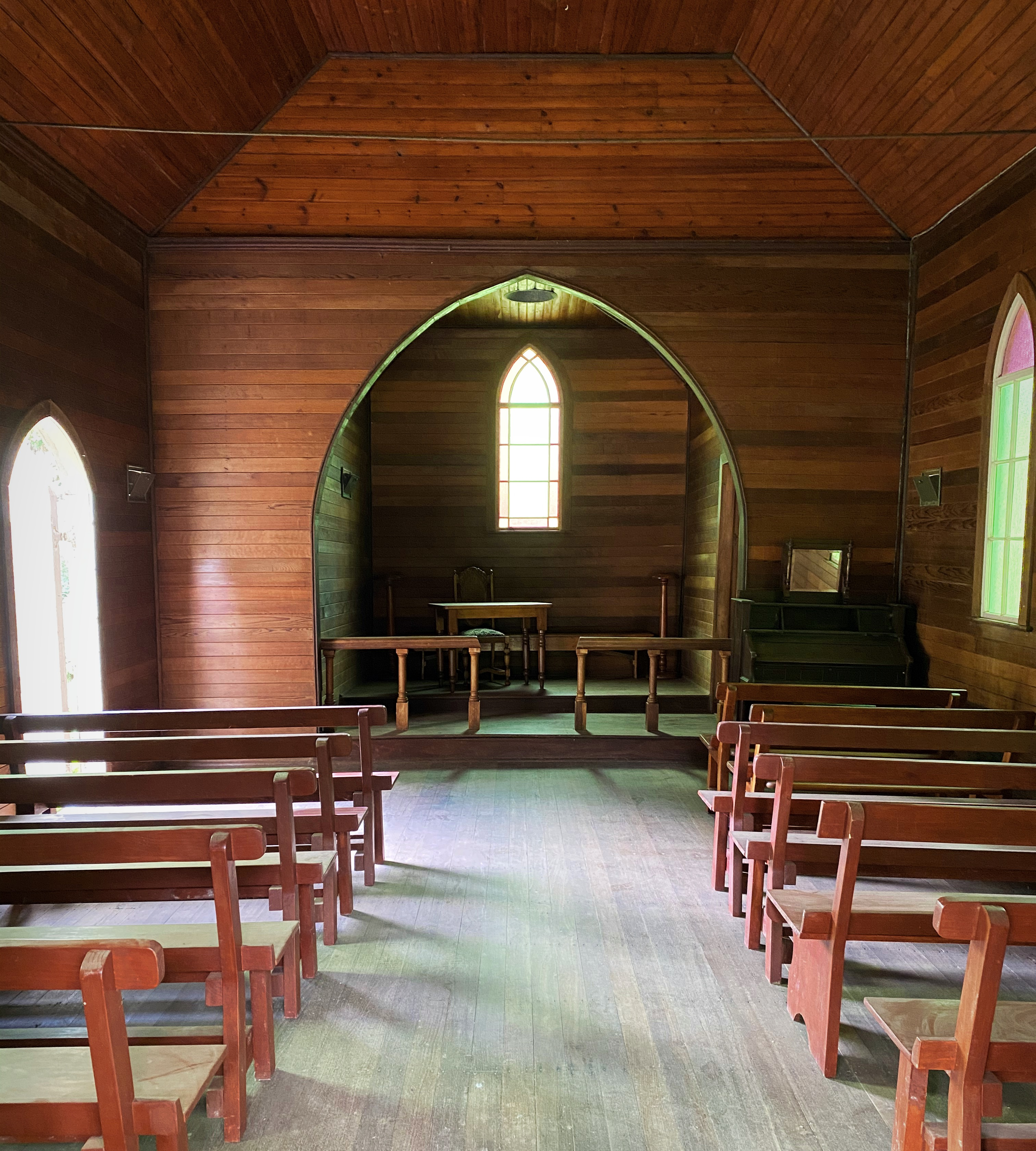
St Clement's Church Eurobin interior 2020

St. Clement's Church is a small weatherboard building of Gothic architecture style, topped with a tin roof. Architecturally, it is representative of the small, rural churches common throughout Australia in the early 20th century. The church's construction includes Baltic pine for the weatherboards and ceiling, jarrah for the floorboards, cedar (Toona ciliata) for the interior walls, and walnut (Juglans) for the altar rail. While Baltic pine remains accessible, jarrah, cedar, and walnut are now considered rare and costly, adding to the historical value of the building's materials. The structure is divided into four main areas: the narthex (entryway), nave, chancel, and vestry (sacristy), and features distinctive stained glass windows in pink and green.

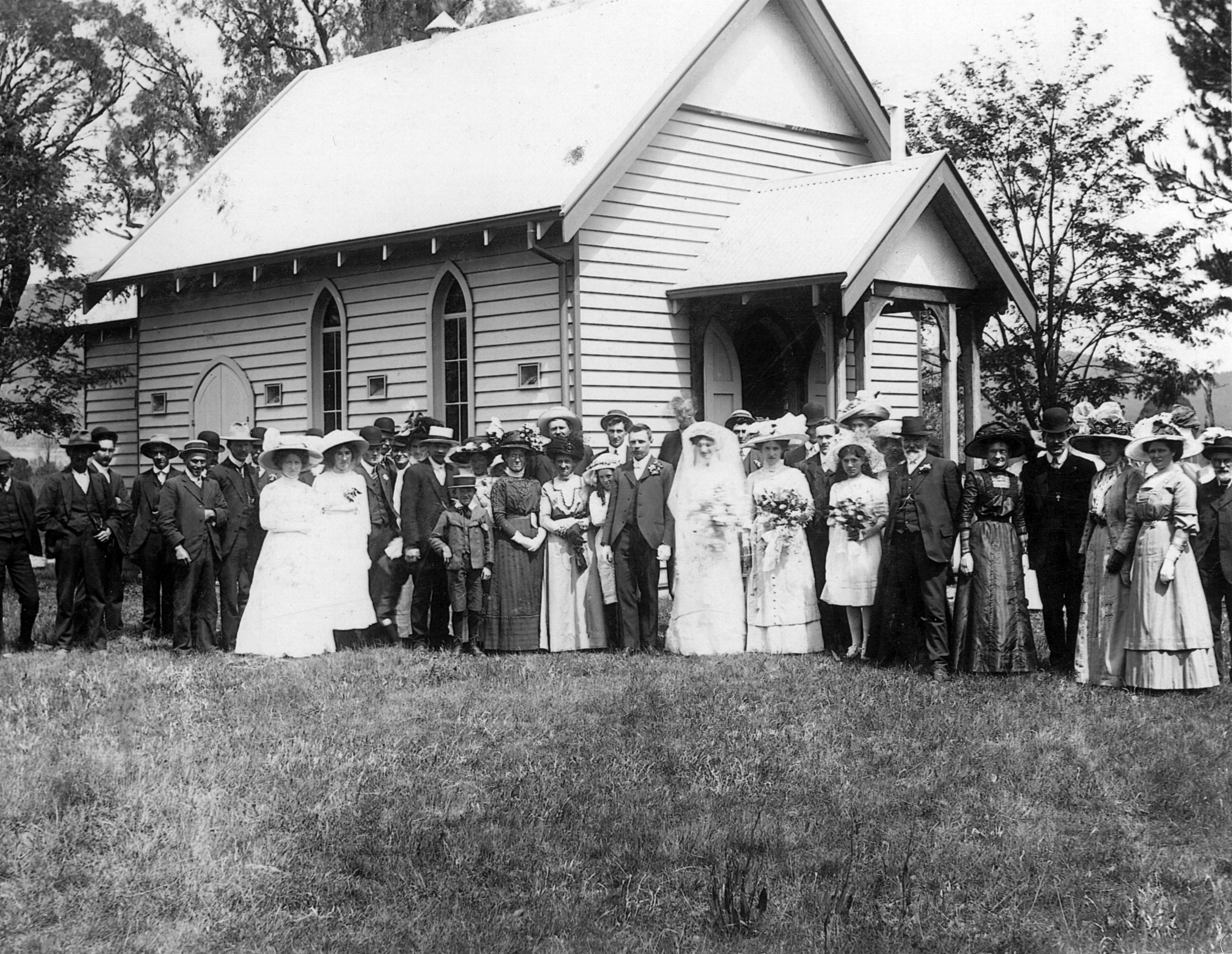
Walkear - McDonald Wedding at St Clement's Church Eurobin 24th October 1911 (From the Walkear Collection of the Myrtleford & District Historical Society Inc.)
