= Ovens, Victoria =

Ovens
- Town
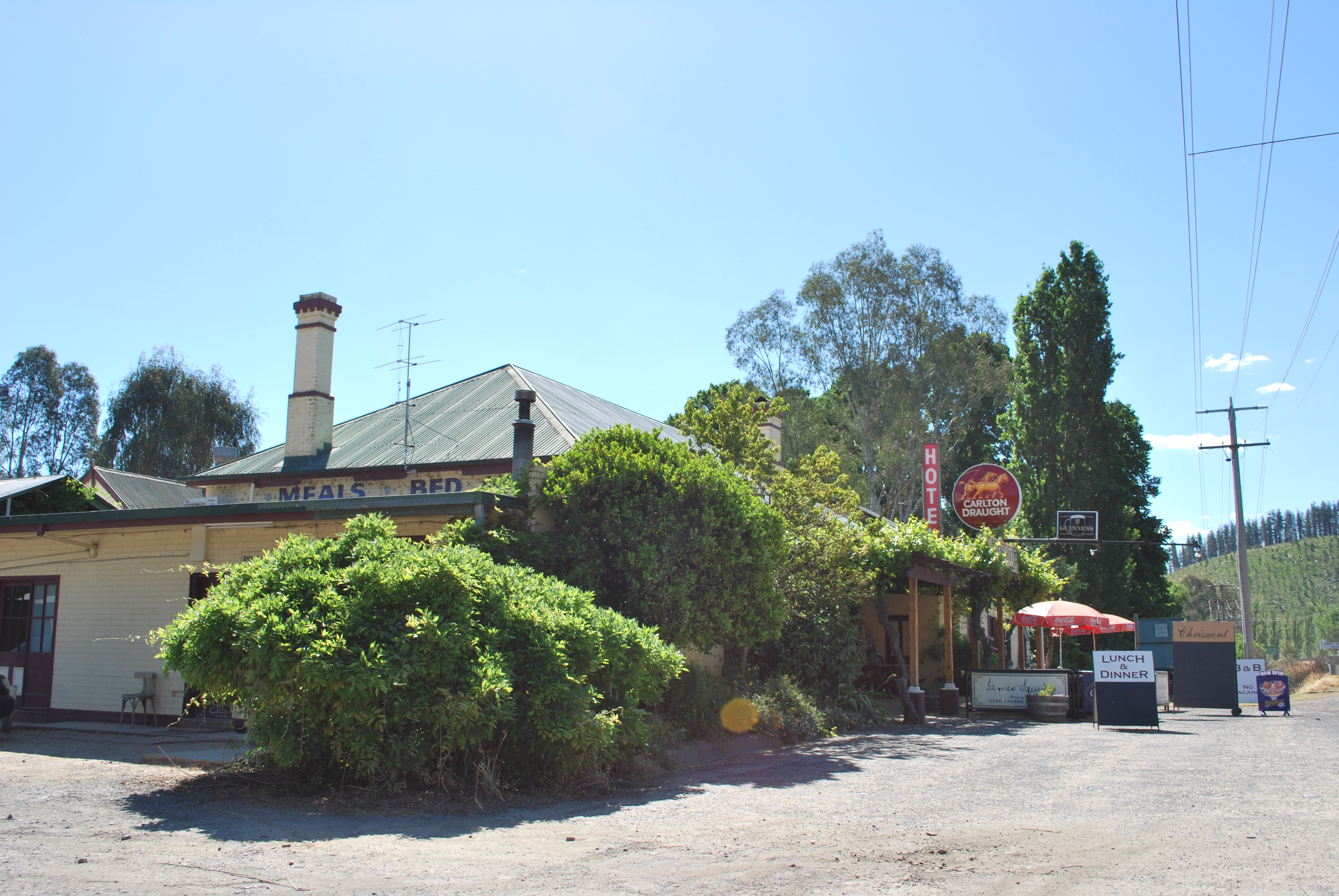
- The Happy Valley Hotel

- Coordinates: 36°35′18″S 146°45′41″E
- Country: Australia
- State: Victoria
- Region: Hume
- LGA: Alpine Shire
- Location: 295 km (183 mi) NE of Melbourne; 53 km (33 mi) SE of Wangaratta; 4 km (2.5 mi) SE of Myrtleford

Government
  - State electorate: Ovens Valley
  - Federal division: Indi
- Elevation: 335 m (1,099 ft)

Population
  - Total: 219 (2016 census)
- Postcode: 3738
- Mean max temp: 26.6 °C (79.9 °F)
- Mean min temp: 10.1 °C (50.2 °F)
- Annual rainfall: 769.1 mm (30.28 in)

Ovens is a locality in north-east Victoria, Australia located at the junction of the Ovens River and Happy Valley Creek. At the 2016 census, Ovens and the surrounding area had a population of 219. It is 4 kilometres (2 mi) south-east of Myrtleford heading towards Bright and is the home of the Happy Valley Hotel and Souter's Vineyard. The area is part of the Alpine Valleys Wine region, and was formerly used for tobacco plantations. Ovens acts as a bypass to many of the local snow fields.

The first post office in the area opened on 9 March 1891 as Barwidgee Railway Station; renamed Ovens Vale Railway Station shortly after, then Ovens Vale in 1899 and, finally, Ovens in 1928.
