= Bright railway line =

Former railway line in Victoria, Australia

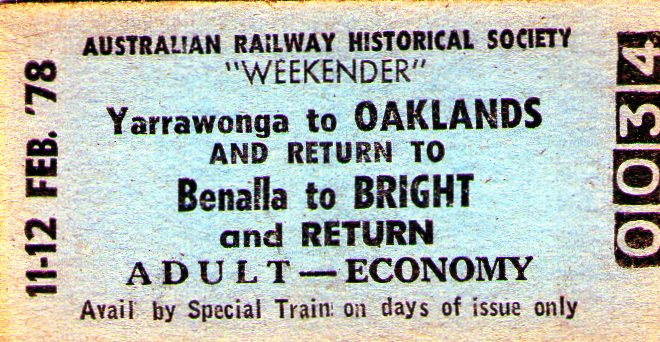
- Benalla-Bright rail ticket from 1978

Overview
- Status: converted to Murray to the Mountains Rail Trail
- Owner: V/Line
- Termini: Bowser; Bright
- Continues from: Yackandandah line
- Stations: 11

Service
- Operator: V/Line

History
- Opened: Bowser-Myrtleford: 17 December 1883; Myrtleford-Bright: 17 October 1890
- Closed: Myrtleford-Bright: 30 November 1983; Bowser-Myrtleford: 13 April 1987

Technical
- Line length: 75.8 kilometres
- Track gauge: 1,600 mm (5 ft 3 in)

The Bright railway line was a railway line in Victoria, Australia constructed by the Victorian Railways as a branch from the previously constructed Yackandandah line to Beechworth, with the Bright line branching at Everton. The line followed the Ovens Valley opening as far as Myrtleford on 17 December 1883 being extended to Bright on 17 October 1890.

The line carried a variety of traffic, including many tourists to Mount Buffalo, where the Victorian Railways operated the Mount Buffalo Chalet. The line closed in on 30 November 1983 between Bright and Myrtleford, and back to the junction with the North East line at Bowser on 13 April 1987, the Yackandandah line from Everton having closed in December 1976.

Newsrail notes that a contract had existed between the Victorian Railways and the Australian Paper Mill factory at Ovens; and that although this contract had expired in December 1973, an occasional wagon of pulp was still being moved, with two wagon-loads sighted on 16 January and another three on 8 February.

In the 1990s the line became part of the Murray to the Mountains Rail Trail. Bright station is maintained as a museum.
