= 2002–03 Australian bushfire season =

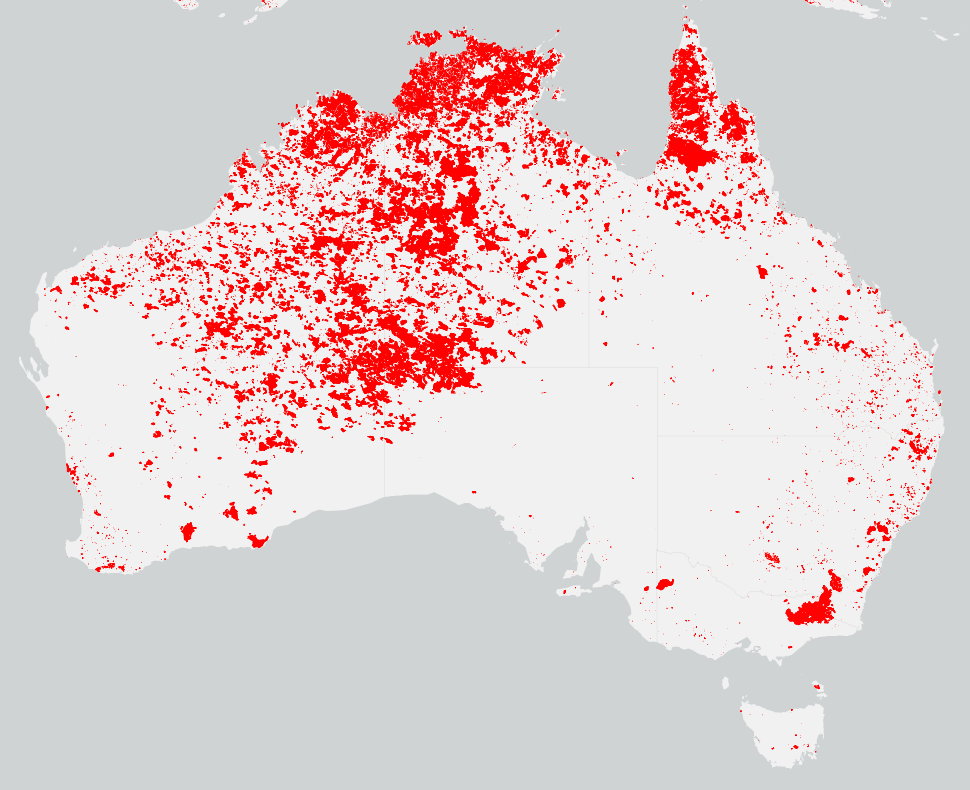
- NASA MODIS burned area detections from June 2002 to May 2003
- Date: Summer 2002 – Autumn 2003
- Location: Australia

Statistics
- Burned area: 21,241,000 ha (52,490,000 acres)

Impacts
- Deaths: 7
- Injuries: Unknown
- Structures lost: 41 houses

Ignition
- Cause: Various, predominantly lightning

A particularly extensive bushfire season in Australia, ran predominantly from December 2002 to March 2003 and involved over 3,000 separate fires in Victoria alone. The 2003 Canberra bushfires were also particularly severe.

The developing drought in Australia and well below-average rainfall through winter and spring of 2002 established conditions conducive to above-average bushfire potential. During the 2002–03 season, there were 5,999 bushfires attended by the relevant agency Australia-wide and 7 fatalities, 4 of those from the January Canberra fires.

Perhaps the most well known fire of the season was the Eastern Victorian alpine bushfires that burnt in north-eastern Victoria, the Victorian Alps and Gippsland. This fire was ignited in several locations by multiple lightning strikes and burnt 1.12 million hectares of land over the course of 2 months. Over 15,000 personnel were directly engaged with this fire complex.

== Overview ==
While hundreds or thousands of individual fires burn in any given bushfire season, areas of large fires that join and split are referred to as 'fire complexes'. The major fire complexes included:

- Big Desert Fire (17–25 December)
- Yambulla Fire (6–11 January)
- Eastern Victorian alpine bushfires (8 January – 7 March)
- Canberra bushfires (8 January – 14 February)

According to the ABS, in their 1301.0 – Year Book Australia, 2004, between 664 and 646 houses were destroyed and 13427 to 14427 stock lost in the 2002-03 bushfire season.

== Timeline ==
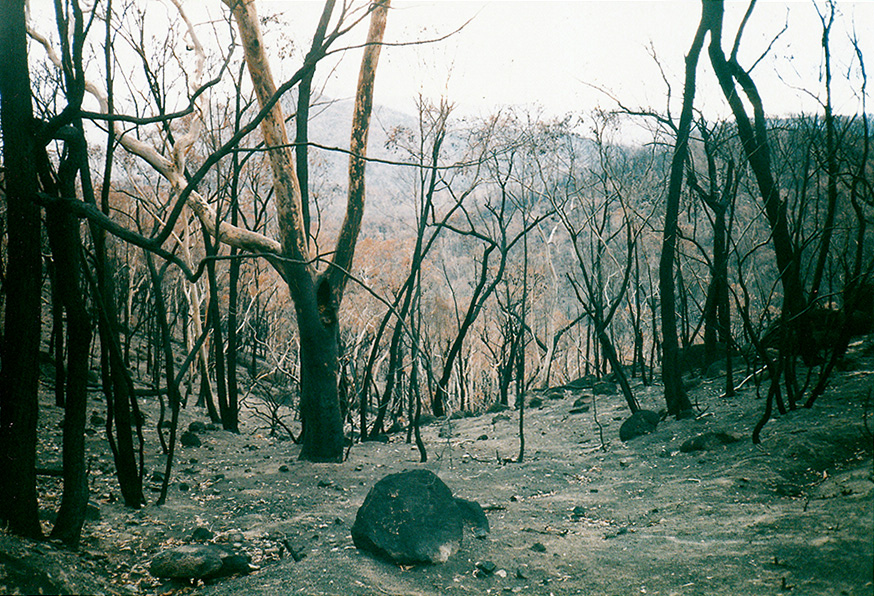
Burnt out bushland about a month after the Victorian fires were contained, near Anglers Rest, East Gippsland, one of the worst hit areas

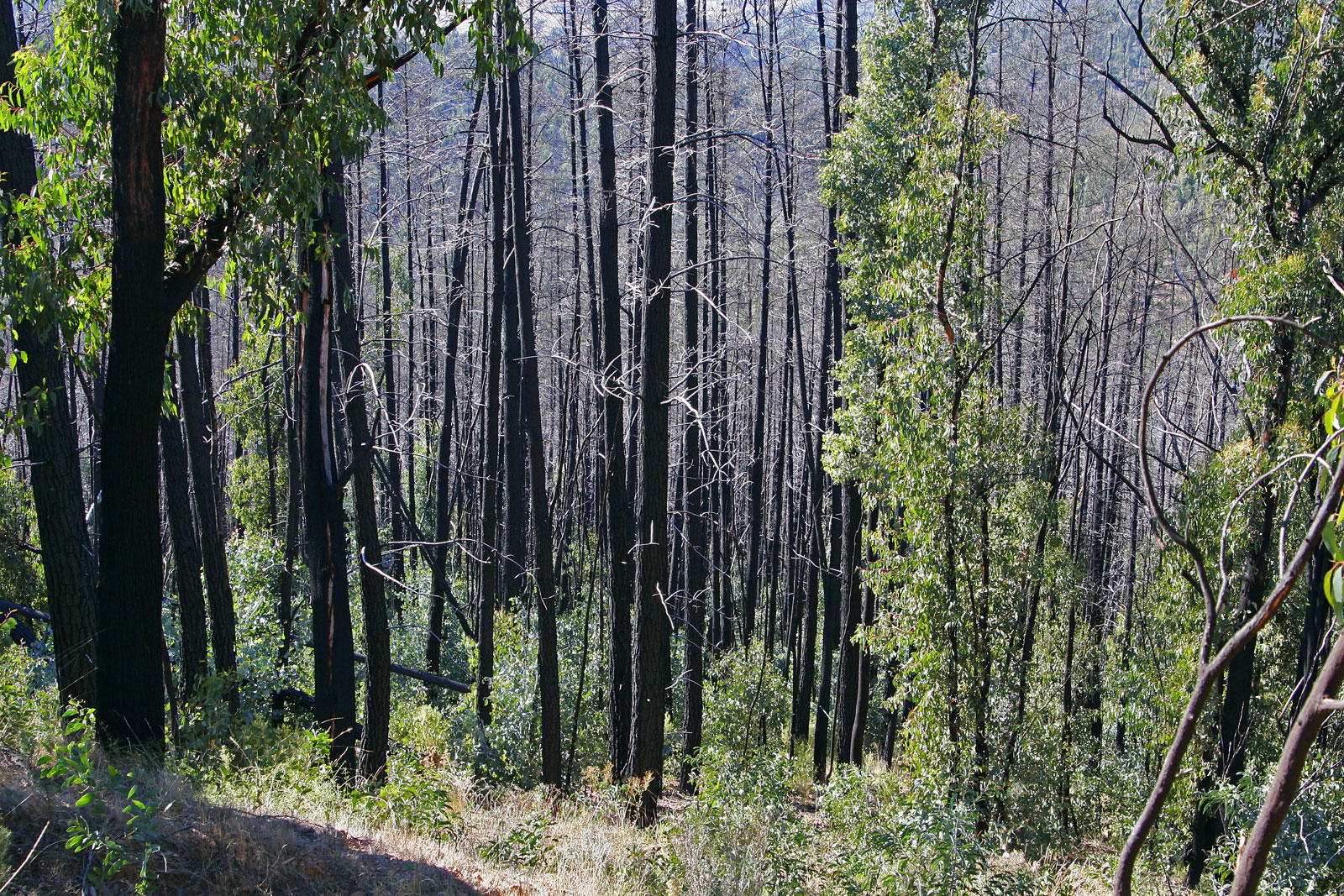
Regrowth on the Bogong High Plains, two years after the 2003 Great Divide Fire Complex

=== September–November 2002 ===
The first fires of the 2002–03 season were reported in September 2002 in Victoria. Ongoing drought and lack of spring rain led to the Bureau of Meteorology predicting conditions comparable to that of the 1983 Ash Wednesday fires, and Fire Authorities were subsequently placed on high alert.

=== December 2002 ===
On 17 December, multiple lightning strikes in the Big Desert Wilderness Park ignited vegetation, creating a fire complex within the park south of Murrayville and burning until 25 December. The Big Desert Fire was, at the time, the biggest fire in Victoria in 20 years, affecting 181,400 hectares of predominantly public land and requiring significant resources to contain.

=== January–March 2003 ===
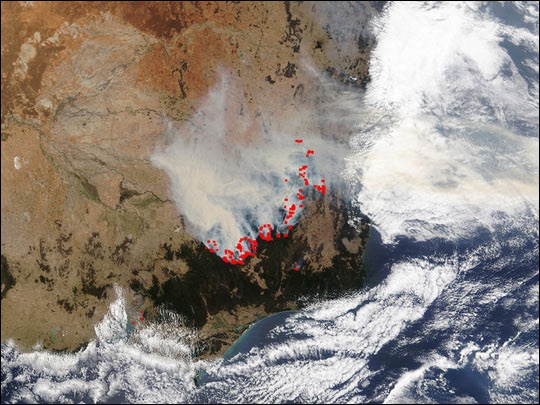
Satellite image of South-eastern Australia, showing the Eastern Victorian alpine fires on 22 January 2003

On 6 January, lightning ignited a fire near Yambulla, north west of Genoa in East Gippsland. The fire was seen as posing a major threat, requiring significant firefighting resources. At the time the main fires started on 8 January, a total of 180 DSE firefighters were allocated to the Yambulla fire, supported by bulldozers and firebombing aircraft. The fire was contained within a few days. This level of resourcing did, however, decrease the local resources available to fight the multiple outbreaks that followed.

On 7 January, multiple lightning strikes in north-east Victoria and Gippsland started hundreds of fires in Victoria that would remain uncontained until 7 March, a full 2 months later. In early February, at the peak of the fires, around 3,760 people were involved in the fire effort, excluding local CFA brigades. This figure includes 160 Defence Force staff, over 300 interstate firefighters, 33 alpine firefighting specialists from New Zealand, and 35 personnel from the United States. In total, 15,725 personnel were directly engaged on the Eastern Victorian alpine bushfires.

== Aftermath ==
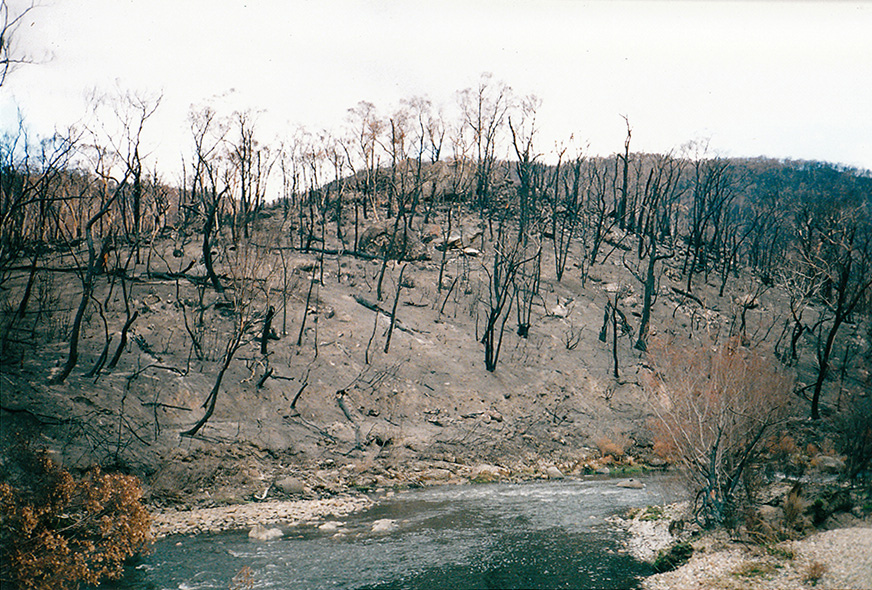
The intensity of the fires in many areas left a desolate landscape, such as by the Big River, north of Anglers Rest in East Gippsland

In October 2003, the DSE published a report on the 2002–03 fires, which was considered a formidable task as it had to document over 3,000 separate fires and all the effects and personnel involved. The report concluded that the responses and containment of the fires was commendable. No people died, and stock losses and property damage was kept to a minimum considering the area of land affected by the fires.

== Statistics ==
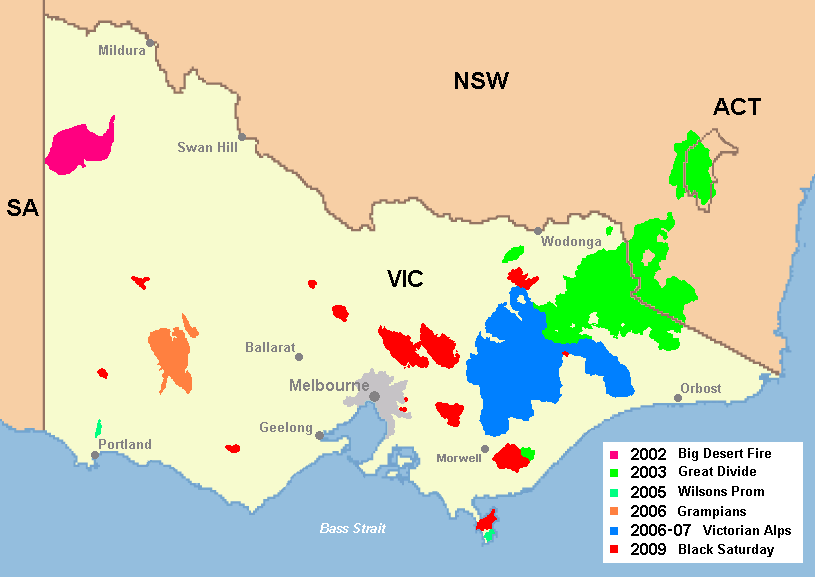
Major bushfires in Victoria in the 2000s

=== Victoria ===
General:

- Over 3,000 fires burned from December to March.
- Firefighters worked on the ground for over 70 days.
- Over 1.12 million hectares were affected in Victoria's North East and Gippsland.
- Over 181,400 hectares were affected in the Big Desert.
- A total of 1.3 million hectares burnt throughout the season.
- No people died as a direct result of these fires.
- Over 35 agencies were involved in fighting the fires and support roles, as well as interstate, New Zealand and US firefighters.
- The total personnel directly engaged on the North East and Gippsland fires was 15,725. A peak of over 3,760 personnel were involved at any one time. 8,595 were volunteers, more than half.
- 8,500 people attended over 250 community briefings.

Structures:

- 41 houses were lost
- 1,000 houses were protected within the perimeter of the fires
- 7,000 houses were at risk within 5 km from the fire perimeter
- 12,000 houses were at risk within 10 km of the fire perimeter
