= Eskdale, Victoria =

Eskdale
- Town
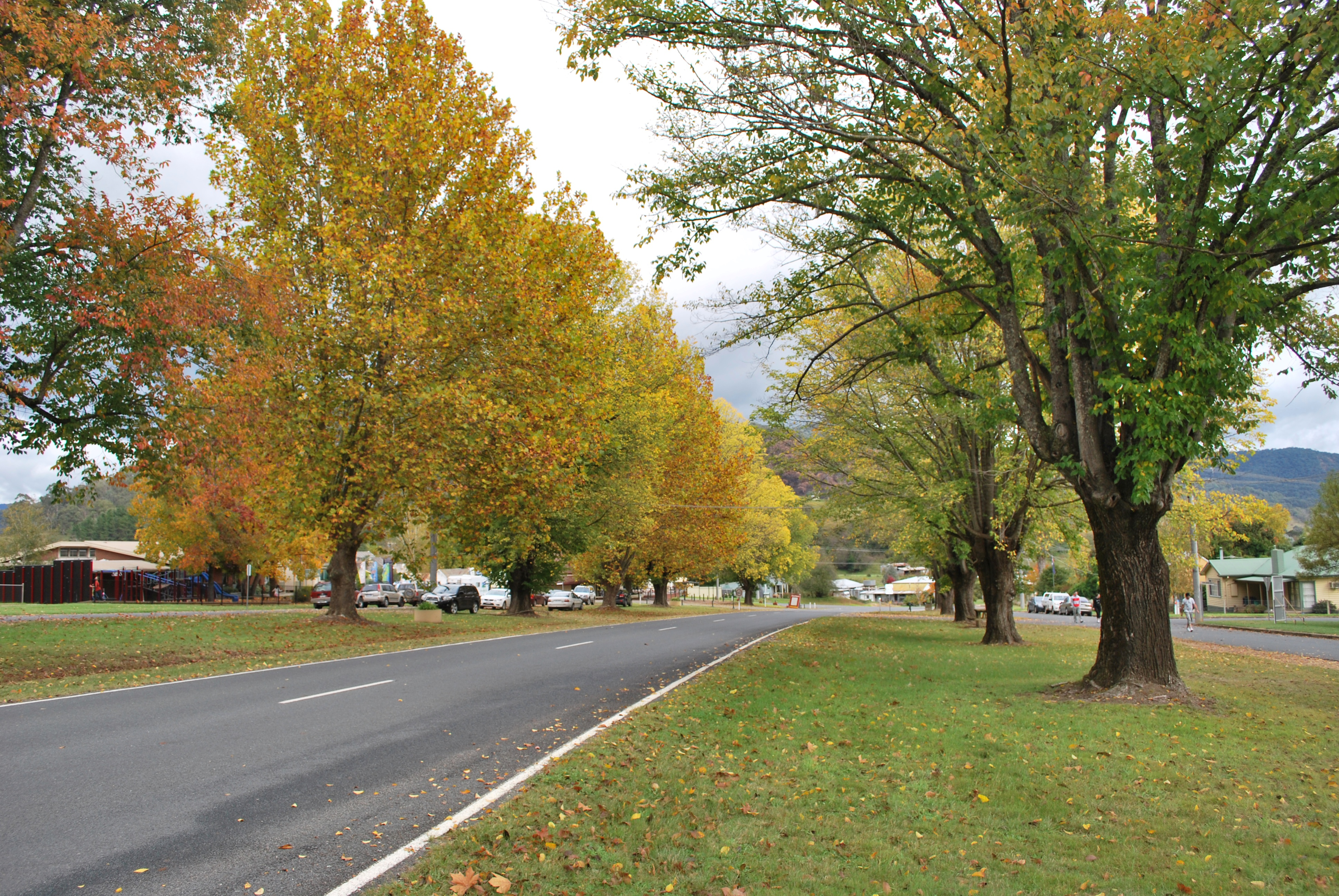
- Omeo Highway at Eskdale

- Interactive map of Eskdale
- Coordinates: 36°28′S 147°15′E
- Country: Australia
- State: Victoria
- Region: Hume
- LGA: Shire of Towong
- Location: 382 km (237 mi) NE of Melbourne; 60 km (37 mi) SE of Wodonga; 39 km (24 mi) SE of Tallangatta

Government
  - State electorate: Benambra
  - Federal division: Indi

Population
  - Total: 238 (2021 census)
- Postcode: 3701

Eskdale is a town in the Shire of Towong, Victoria, Australia. It is situated in the Mitta Valley, near the river's confluence with the Little Snowy Creek, amongst the foothills of Mount Bogong. At the 2021 census, Eskdale had a population of 238.

== History ==
The post office opened on 1 July 1885. A Beaufort bomber crashed near Eskdale in 1945 during a training flight.

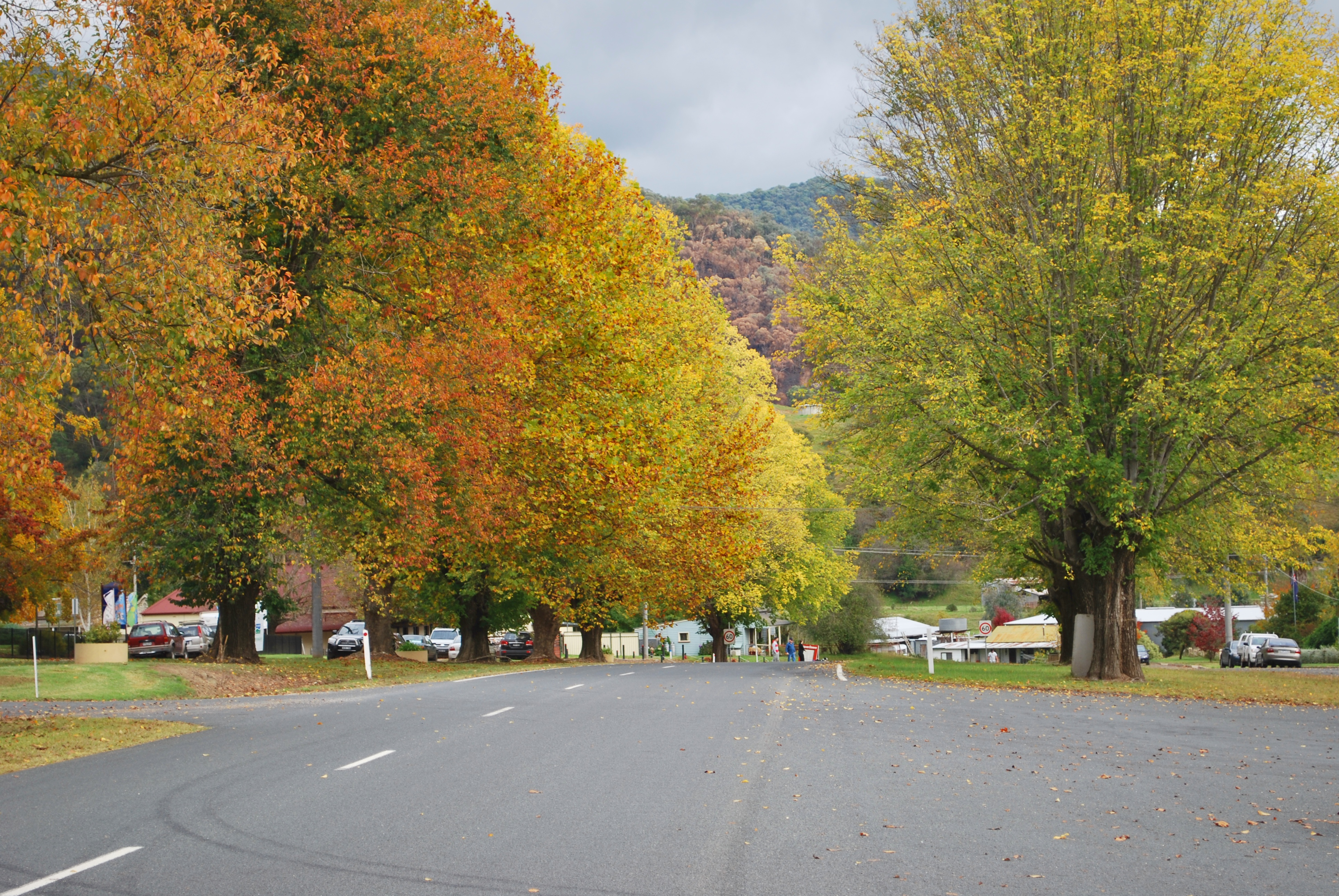
Autumn foliage in the Main Street

== The town today ==
The town has a supermarket, cafe, post office, church, primary school, bowling green and a recently built sports complex. The town in conjunction with neighbouring township Mitta Mitta has an Australian Rules football team Mitta United competing in the Tallangatta & District Football League.
