= 2003 Eastern Victorian alpine bushfires =

Bushfires in Australia

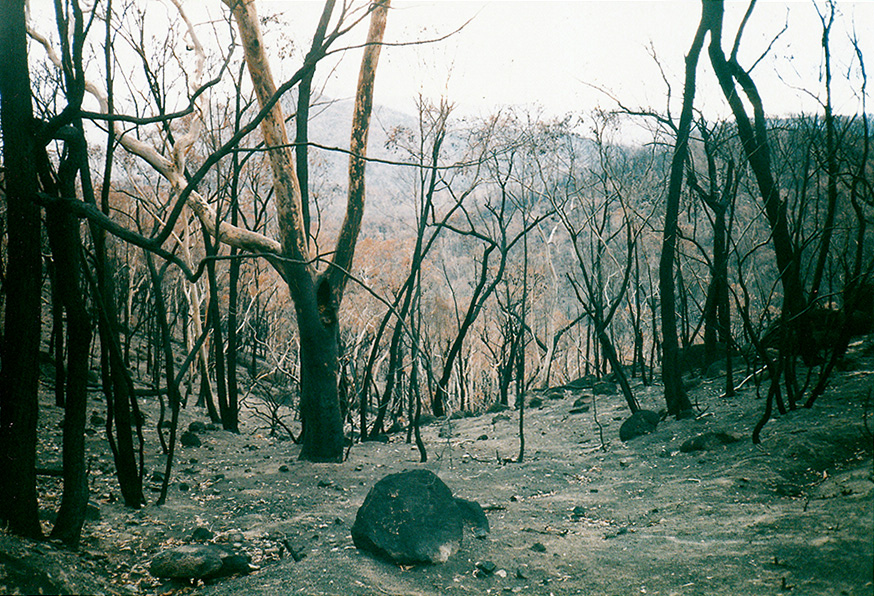
- Burnt out bushland near Anglers Rest on the Omeo Highway, one of the worst hit areas
- Date: 8 January 2003 – 7 March 2003
- Location: Alpine National Park and Mount Buffalo National Park in north-eastern Victoria, Australia

Statistics
- Burned area: 1,300,000 hectares (3,200,000 acres)
- Land use: Public land; national parks; rural and residential

Impacts
- Structures lost: 41 homes; 213 other structures; Three bridges; 10,000 livestock

Ignition
- Cause: Lightning

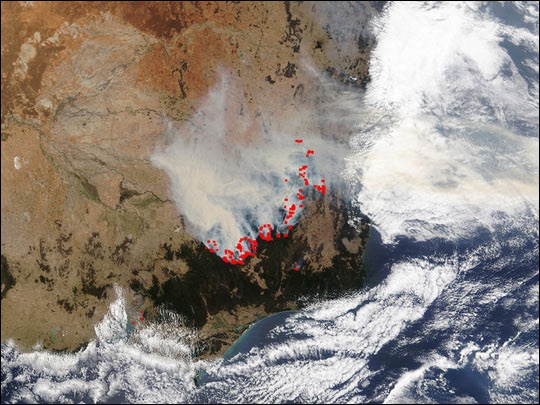
NASA photo of South-eastern Australia showing fire activity on 22 January 2003

The Eastern Victorian alpine bushfires were a series of bushfires in 2003 that burnt in the Alpine National Park and Mount Buffalo National Park in north-eastern Victoria, Australia. The bushfire started with eighty-seven fires that were started by lightning in the north east of Victoria on 8 January 2003. Eight of these fires were unable to be contained and joined to form the largest fire in Victoria since the 1939 "Black Friday" bushfires.

The main fire burnt over 1,300,000 hectares (3,200,000 acres) over 59 days before it was contained on 7 March 2003. 41 homes and 213 other structures were destroyed, along with tree bridges, and 10,000 livestock were killed. Thousands of kilometres of fencing was also destroyed. This was the longest running fire until the 2006–07 Great Divide fires.

In early February, at the peak of the fires, around 3,760 people were involved in the fire effort, excluding local Country Fire Authority brigades. This figure includes 160 Australian Defence Force staff, over 300 interstate firefighters, 33 alpine firefighting specialists from New Zealand and 35 personnel from the United States. In total, 15,725 personnel were directly engaged on fighting these bushfires.

The areas affected included, Mount Buffalo, Mount Bogong, Mount Feathertop, Bright, Dinner Plain, Benambra, Omeo, Cobungra, Shannonvale, Bundara, Anglers Rest, Sunnyside, Glen Wills, and Dargo.

== See also ==
- 2003 Canberra bushfires
- 2002–03 Australian bushfire season
- Bushfires in Victoria
