= Bundara River =

Bundara
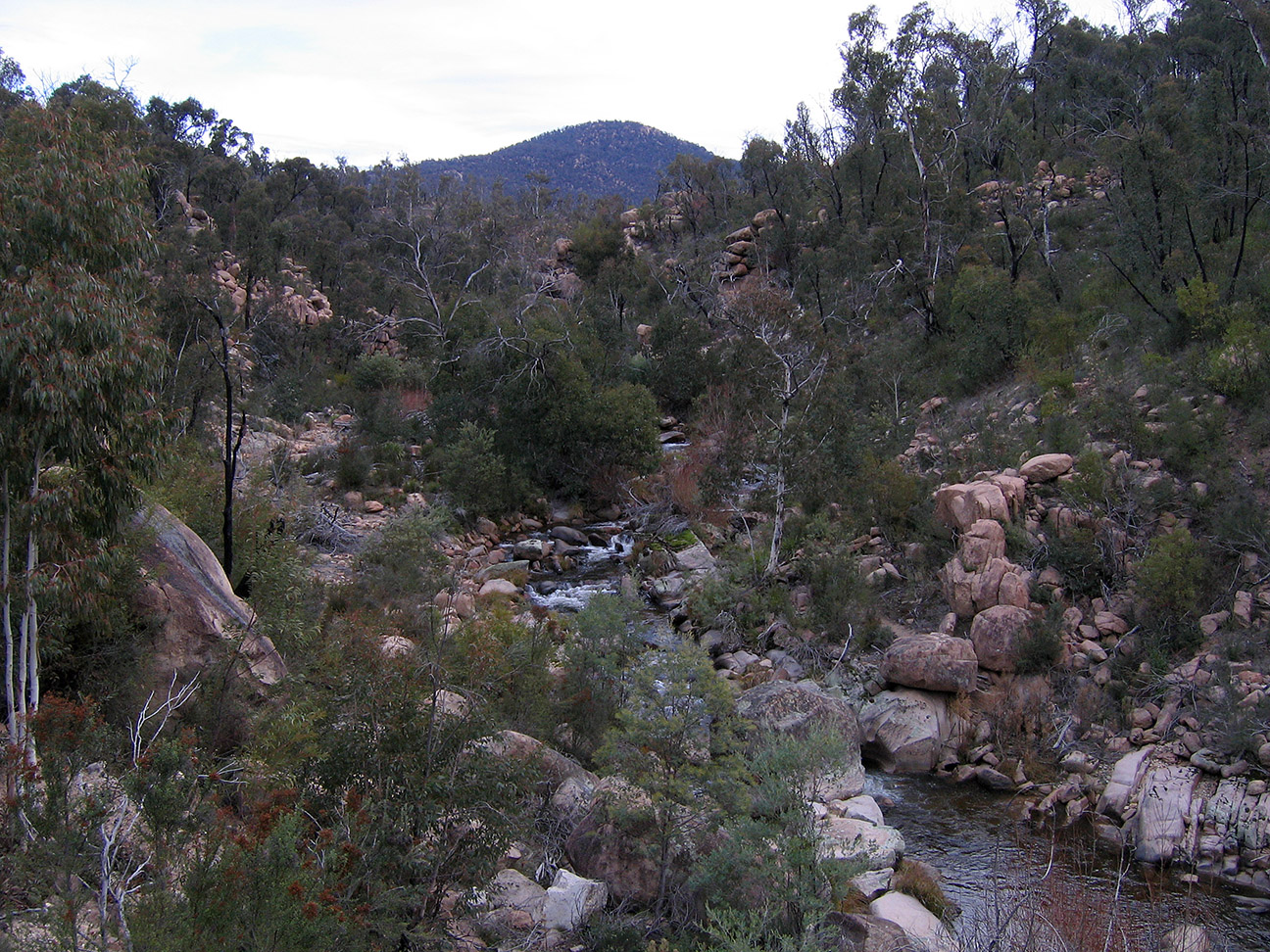
- Bundara River looking upstream from the Omeo Highway, north of Anglers Rest

- Location of the Bundara River mouth in Victoria

Location
- Country: Australia
- State: Victoria
- Region: Victorian Alps (IBRA), East Gippsland
- Local government area: East Gippsland Shire

Physical characteristics
- Source: Victorian Alps
  - location: east of Mount Hotham
  - coordinates: 36°57′S 147°14′E
  - elevation: 1,420 m (4,660 ft)
- Mouth: confluence with the Big River
  - location: Anglers Rest
  - coordinates: 36°58′43″S 147°29′39″E
  - elevation: 650 m (2,130 ft)
- Length: 30 km (19 mi)

Basin features
- River system: North-East Murray catchment, Murray-Darling basin
- National park: Alpine National Park

The Bundara River (formerly known as the Bundara Mungee River and the Bundarah River), a perennial river of the North-East Murray catchment of the Murray-Darling basin, is located in the East Gippsland and Alpine regions of Victoria, Australia.

== Location and features ==
The Bundara River rises east of Mount Hotham and Mount Loch in the Australian Alps in the Alpine National Park at an elevation of 1,420 m (4,659 ft), and flows into the Big River about 2 kilometres (1.2 mi) north of Anglers Rest. The river flows generally to the east, travelling through the national park for most of its course. About 2 kilometres (1.2 mi) north of Anglers Rest the Omeo Highway crosses over the river, and about 100 metres (330 ft) north of this crossing it reaches its confluence into the Big River at an elevation of 650 m (2,133 ft). The Big River forms its confluences with the Cobungra River just south of this point to form the Mitta Mitta River. The river descends 770 metres (2,530 ft) over its 30-kilometre (19 mi) course.

=== Tributaries ===
Key tributaries of the Bundara River include High Plains Creek, Waterfall Creek, and Tea Tree Creek. The main tributaries flow off the southern slopes of Mount Jim (1,818 m (5,965 ft)), Mount Bundara (1,741 m (5,712 ft)) and Mount Cope (1,837 m (6,027 ft)), and the hills to the east of the main ridge of the Australian Alps.

=== River health ===
The Bundara River and its tributaries are generally protected within the Alpine National Park. Most of the waterways in the Mitta Mitta basin are recognised as being in good to excellent condition. Extensive forest covers much of the catchment area. Despite some land clearing and livestock damage to river banks, the aquatic habitat is generally very good.

The Bundara River is noted as being particularly good for brown trout fishing. The Bundara River is part of the North East Catchment Management Authority's Victorian River Health Program, aimed at achieving healthy rivers.

In early 2003, large areas of forest around the Bundara River and its catchments were severely impacted by the massive Eastern Victorian alpine bushfires. These fires burnt through approximately 13,000 square kilometres (5,000 sq mi) of the area's bushland for close to two months. The damage resulting from the fires impacted river health for some time after the fires.

== See also ==
- List of rivers of Australia § Victoria

== Gallery ==
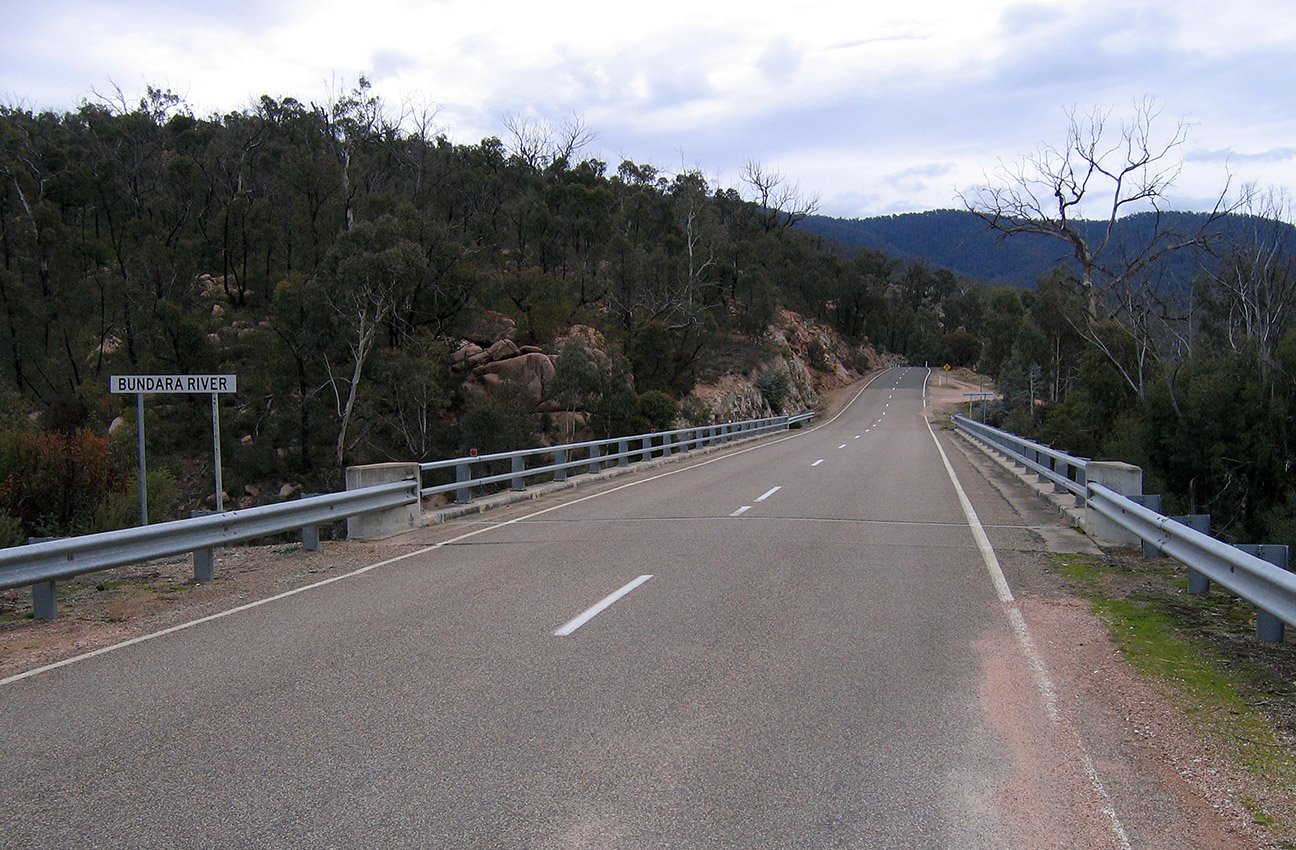
Omeo Highway crossing the Bundara River near Anglers Rest

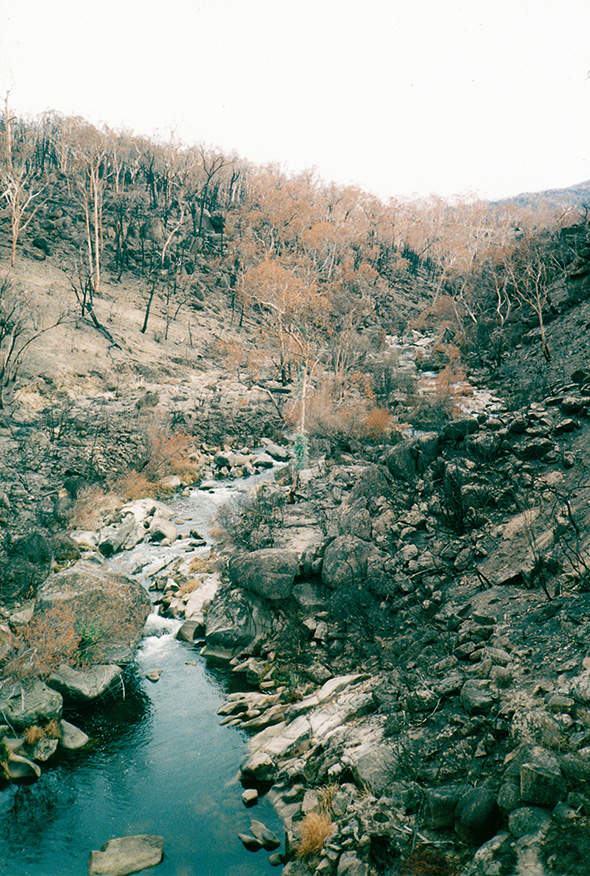
Devastated bushland on the Bundara River near Anglers Rest resulting from the 2003 Eastern Victorian alpine bushfires
