= Omeo Highway =

Highway in Victoria

Omeo Highway Victoria
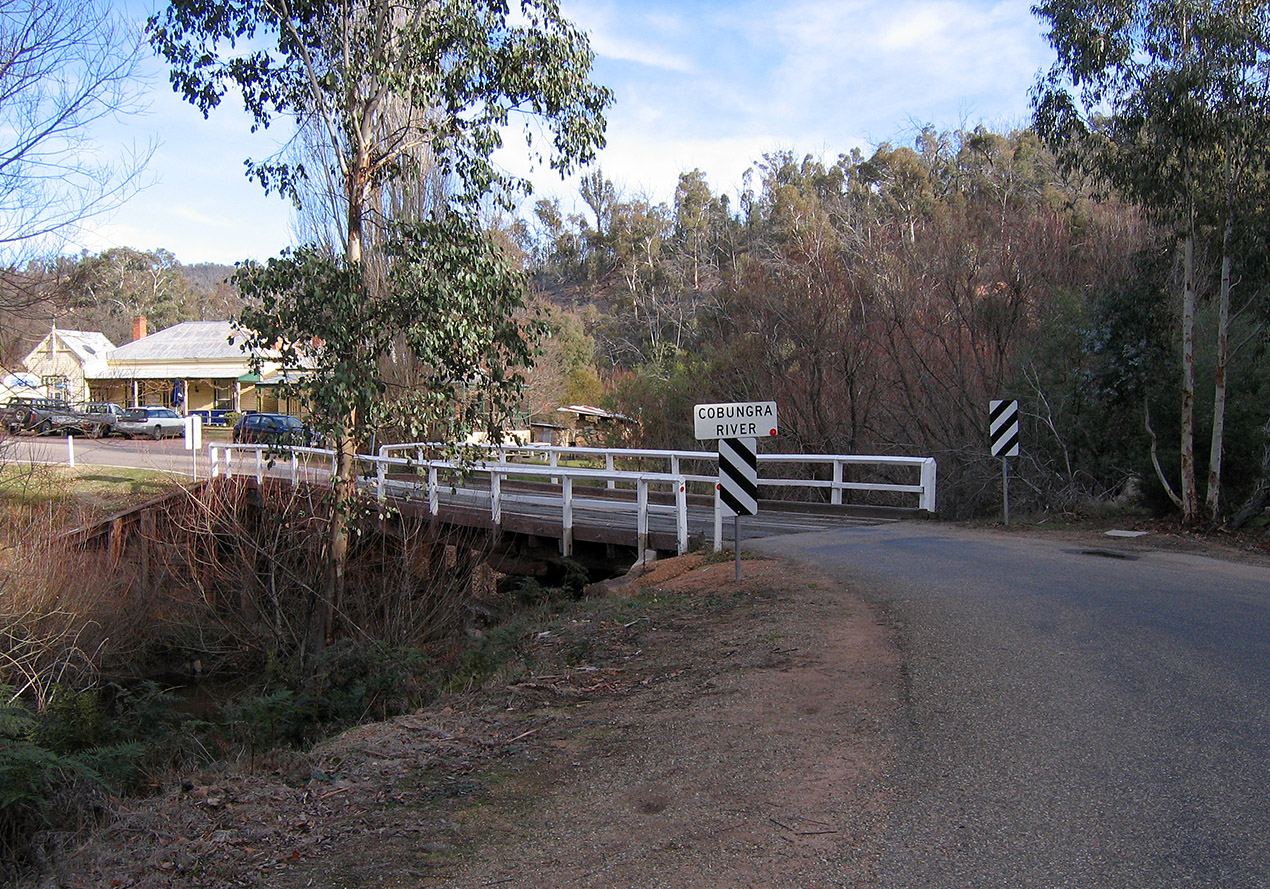
- Omeo Highway crossing Cobungra River at Anglers Rest
- Coordinates: 36.215581°S 147.238879°E (North end); 37.100524°S 147.601016°E (South end)

General information
- Type: Highway
- Length: 162.8 km (101 mi)
- Gazetted: February 1914 (as Main Road); February 1925 (as State Highway)
- Route number(s): C543 (1998–present)
- Former route number: State Route 195 (1986–1996) (Tallangatta–Bairnsdale)

Major junctions
- North end: Murray Valley Highway; Tallangatta, Victoria
- Benambra–Corryong Road
- South end: Great Alpine Road; Omeo, Victoria

Location(s)
- Region: Hume, Gippsland
- Major settlements: Eskdale, Mitta Mitta, Anglers Rest

Highway system
- Highways in Australia; National Highway • Freeways in Australia; Highways in Victoria

Omeo Highway is a 163 kilometre rural highway in eastern Victoria, Australia, connecting Tallangatta on Lake Hume in north-east Victoria to Omeo in East Gippsland, over parts of the Victorian Alps.

== Route ==
Omeo Highway commences at the intersection with Murray Valley Highway in Tallangatta and heads in a southerly direction as a two-lane, single carriageway rural highway, mostly following the course of Mitta Mitta River through Eskdale until it reaches Mitta Mitta, where it starts to climb the Victorian Alps through the Alpine National Park, before it eventually descends into the Omeo Valley, mostly following the course of Livingstone Creek until eventually terminating at the intersection with Great Alpine Road in Omeo.

Conditions in the mountains can change quickly and be harsh, particularly during winter. Snow is not uncommon in the winter season and may cause the road to be closed for short periods. There are no substantial settlements between Mitta Mitta and Omeo, and therefore fuel is unavailable. There is no mobile phone communication from Mitta Mitta to the south of Anglers Rest, although there is an emergency roadside phone at the base of Mount Wills. There is some CB repeater coverage including UHF Ch1 (Mitta), and other traffic and log trucks on Ch 40. Police and ambulance services are available at Mitta Mitta and Omeo.

As probably one of the most impressive scenic routes in Australia, there are excellent views along most of the road, making it very popular with tourists. Due to the winding nature of the road along Omeo Highway, it is a common place for large groups of motorcycles to go riding. The Victorian Government completed the sealing of the road in March 2014 and the official opening of the completed highway took place at "The Walnuts" in May 2014.

There are some interesting stories of the highway that can be downloaded.

== History ==
Within Victoria, the passing of the Country Roads Act 1912 through the Parliament of Victoria provided for the establishment of the Country Roads Board (later VicRoads) and their ability to declare Main Roads, taking responsibility for the management, construction and care of the state's major roads from local municipalities. Bairnsdale-Bruthen Road was declared a Main Road from Bairnsdale to Bruthen on 2 February 1914, Bruthen-Omeo Road was declared a Main Road from Bruthen through Swifts Creek to Omeo on 23 March 1914; (Tallangatta-) Omeo Road from Tallangatta through Mitta Mitta to Granite Flat, and Tallangatta-Wodonga Road from Tallangatta to Wodonga were declared Main Roads on 30 November 1914.

The passing of the Highways and Vehicles Act 1924 provided for the declaration of State Highways, roads two-thirds financed by the state government through the Country Roads Board. Omeo Road was declared a State Highway on 11 February 1925 - Victoria's first gazetted State Highway - cobbled from a collection of roads from Bairnsdale through Bruthen, Omeo, and Tallangatta to Wodonga, subsuming the original declaration of Bairnsdale-Bruthen Road, Bruthen-Omeo Road, Tallangatta-Omeo Road and Tallangatta-Wodonga Road as Main Roads; the name was amended to Omeo Highway shortly afterwards on 7 July 1925. The northern end of the highway was truncated back to Tallangatta, with the former alignment running between Wodonga and Tallangatta subsumed into Murray Valley Highway on its declaration a few years later in September 1932.

Omeo Highway was signed as State Route 195 between Tallangatta and Bairnsdale in 1986. The southern end of the highway was truncated back to Omeo, with the former alignment between Omeo and Bairnsdale subsumed into the Great Alpine Road on its declaration in 1996. With Victoria's conversion to the newer alphanumeric system in the late 1990s, the remainder of the highway was assigned route C543.

The passing of the Road Management Act 2004 through the Parliament of Victoria granted the responsibility of overall management and development of Victoria's major arterial roads to VicRoads: VicRoads re-declared the road in 2004 as Omeo Highway (Arterial #6560), from Tallangatta to Omeo.

== Major intersections ==
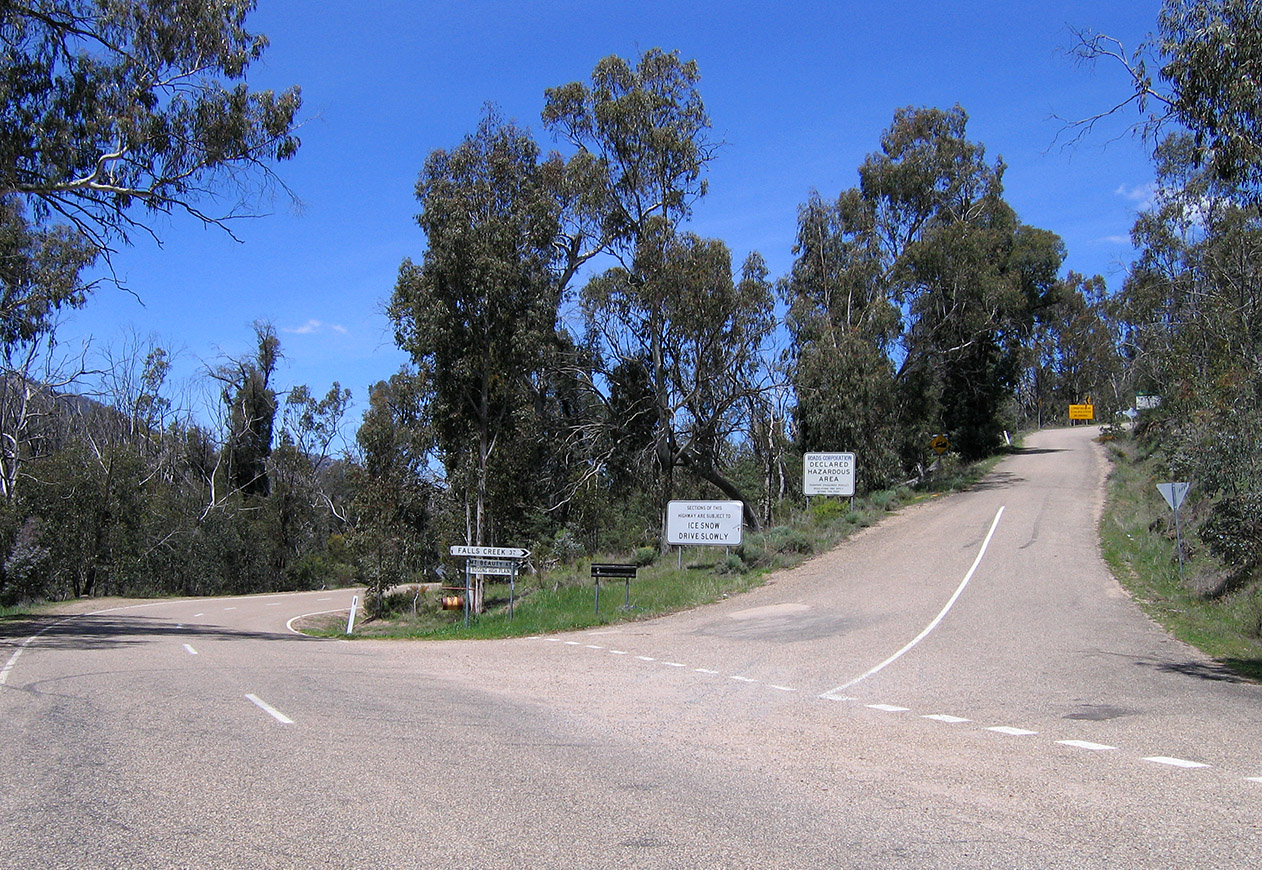
Bogong High Plains Road turnoff, on Omeo Highway at Shannonvale

| LGA | Location | km | mi | Destinations | Notes |
|---|---|---|---|---|---|
| Towong | Tallangatta | 0.0 | 0.0 | Murray Valley Highway (B400) – Tallangatta, Wodonga, Corryong, Jindabyne | Northern terminus of highway and route C543 |
| Mitta Mitta River | | 25.1 | 15.6 | Peters Bridge | |
| Mitta Mitta River | | 27.0 | 16.8 | Ellis Bridge | |
| Towong | Tallandoon | 27.1 | 16.8 | Lockharts Gap Road (C537) – Wodonga | |
| Towong | Eskdale | 39.3 | 24.4 | Mitta North Road – Eskdale | |
| Towong | Mitta Mitta | 52.6 | 32.7 | Dartmouth Road (C544) – Dartmouth | |
| Big River | | 118.7 | 73.8 | Bridge (unknown name) | |
| East Gippsland | Glen Valley | 122.8 | 76.3 | Bogong High Plains Road – Falls Creek, Mount Beauty | |
| Bundara River | | 131.9 | 82.0 | Bridge (unknown name) | |
| Cobungra River | | 134.1 | 83.3 | Bridge (unknown name) | |
| East Gippsland | Anglers Rest | 133.7 | 83.1 | Callaghans Road – Anglers Rest | |
| Livingstone Creek | | 157.5 | 97.9 | Bridge (unknown name) | |
| East Gippsland | Omeo | 158.8 | 98.7 | Benambra–Corryong Road (C545) – Benambra, Corryong | |
| East Gippsland | Omeo | 162.8 | 101.2 | Great Alpine Road (B500 northwest, southeast) – Bruthen, Bairnsdale, Mount Hotham, Wangaratta; Bilton Street (southwest) – Omeo | Southern terminus of highway and route C543 |
1.000 mi = 1.609 km; 1.000 km = 0.621 mi: Route transition

== See also ==
- Highways in Australia
- Highways in Victoria
