= Big River (Mitta Mitta River, Victoria) =

Big
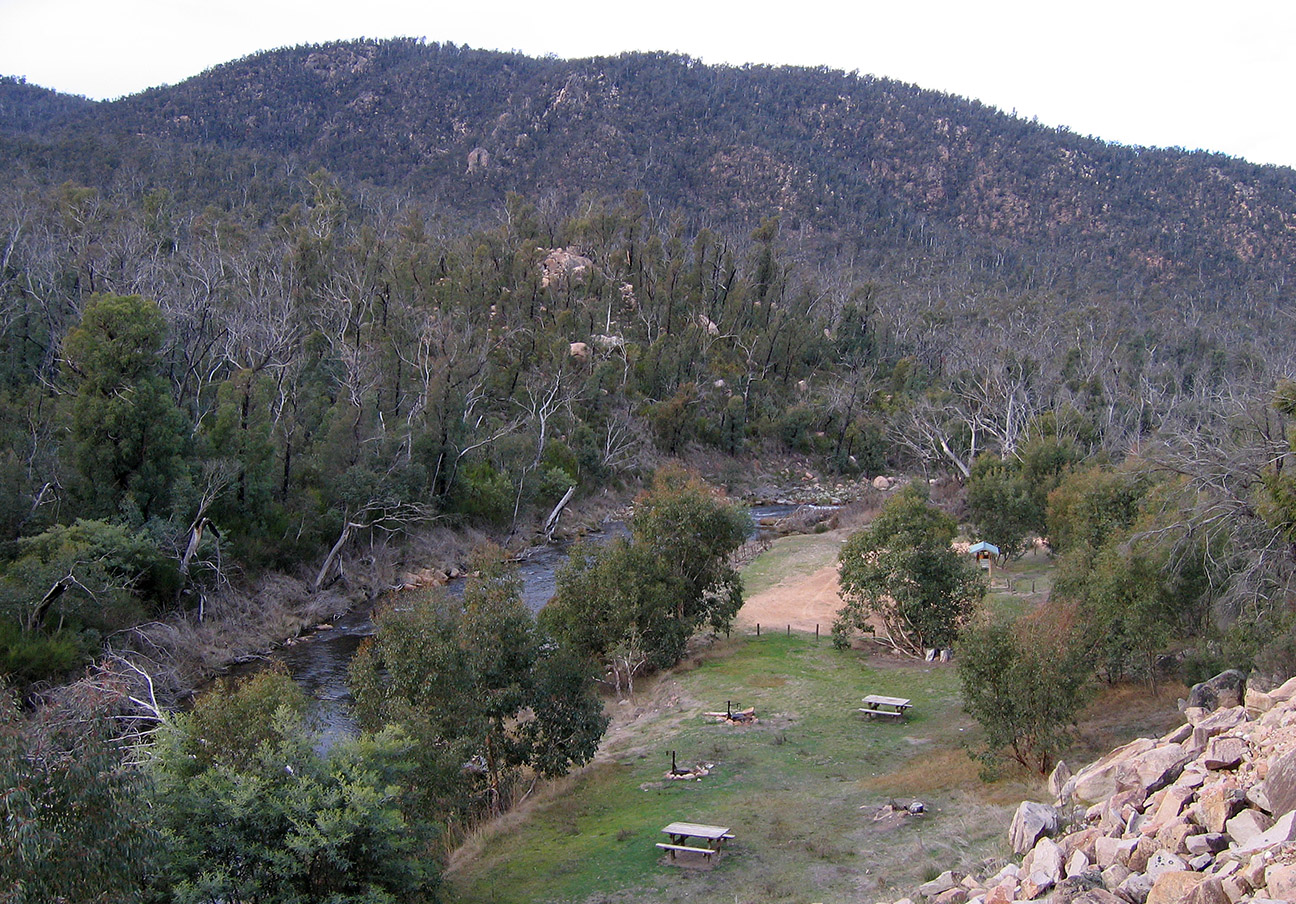
- Looking south over the Big River at the Bundara Campground, near Anglers Rest

- Location of the Big River mouth in Victoria

Location
- Country: Australia
- State: Victoria
- Region: Victorian Alps (IBRA), East Gippsland
- Local government area: East Gippsland Shire

Physical characteristics
- Source: Spion Kopje, Victorian Alps
  - location: near Falls Creek
  - coordinates: 36°49′S 147°19′E
  - elevation: 1,850 m (6,070 ft)
- Mouth: confluence with the Cobungra River to form the Mitta Mitta River
  - location: Anglers Rest
  - coordinates: 36°59′23″S 147°30′40″E
  - elevation: 645 m (2,116 ft)
- Length: 52 km (32 mi)

Basin features
- River system: North-East Murray catchment, Murray–Darling basin
- Tributaries
  - left: Glen Wills Creek
  - right: Hollonds Creek, Middle Creek (Victoria), Bundara River
- National park: Alpine National Park

The Big River, a perennial river of the North-East Murray catchment of the Murray–Darling basin, is located in the East Gippsland and Alpine regions of Victoria, Australia. It flows from the northern slopes of Falls Creek in the Australian Alps, joining with the Cobungra River near Anglers Rest to form the Mitta Mitta River.

== Course ==
The Big River rises below the ski resort at Falls Creek in the Alpine National Park, on the northern slopes of Spion Kopje at an elevation of 1,837 metres (6,027 ft) above sea level. The river flows north off Spion Kopje, then east in the valley between Spion Kopje and Victoria's highest peak, Mount Bogong, separating Mount Bogong itself from the Bogong High Plains. The river then flows south-southeast, forming the eastern edge of the national park, before turning southward near the Omeo Highway crossing around Glen Valley, 16 kilometres (9.9 mi) north of Anglers Rest.

The Omeo Highway then closely follows the course of the Big River until the point where the Bundara River enters it, about 2 kilometres (1.2 mi) north of Anglers Rest. Shortly downstream from this, near Anglers Rest, the Big River forms its confluence with the Cobungra River, with the two rivers becoming the Mitta Mitta River, itself a tributary of the Murray River. The river descends 1,210 metres (3,970 ft) over its 52-kilometre (32 mi) course.

=== Tributaries ===
Key tributaries of the Big River include Cairn Creek, Beckraith Creek, Camp Creek, Hollonds Creek, Dead Horse Creek, Middle Creek, Glen Wills Creek, Wallaby Creek, Burnside Creek, and the Bundara River. The main tributaries flow off the northern slopes of Spion Kopje, the southern slopes of Mount Bogong, the north, east, and west slopes of Mount Nelse and Mount Nelse North, the eastern slopes of Mount Cope, and the western slopes of Mount Wills and The Knocker.

=== River health ===
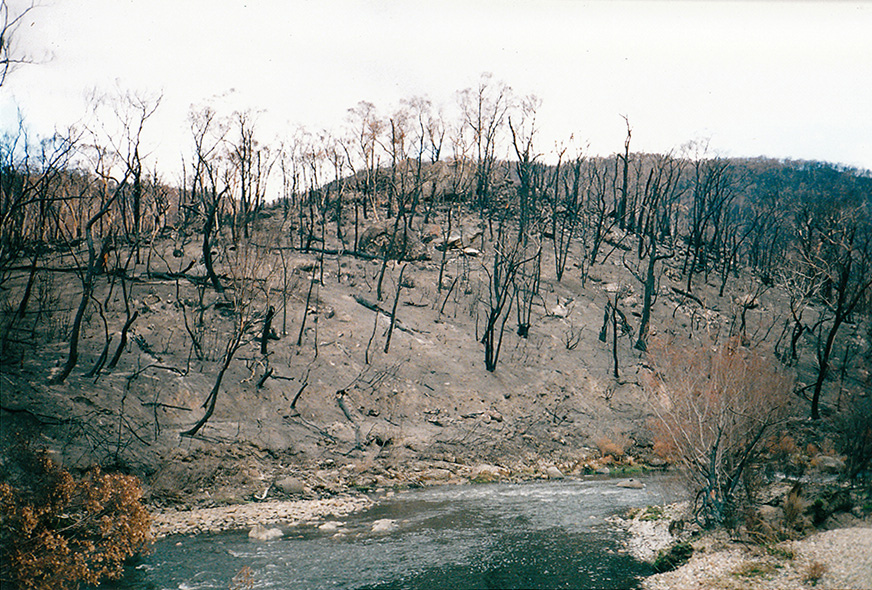
Devastated bushland alongside the Big River near Anglers Rest resulting from the 2003 Eastern Victorian alpine bushfires

Most of the waterways in the Mitta Mitta sub-catchment basin are recognised as being in good to excellent condition. Extensive forest covers much of the catchment area. Despite some land clearing and livestock damage to river banks, the aquatic habitat is generally very good. The upper Big River above the Glen Valley is classified as a "Representative River of East Victorian dissected uplands".

In early 2003, large areas of forest around the Big River and its catchments were severely impacted by the Eastern Victorian alpine bushfires. These fires burnt through approximately 13,000 square kilometres (5,000 sq mi) of the area's bushland for close to two months. The damage resulting from the fires impacted river health for some time after the fires.

== See also ==
- List of rivers of Australia § Victoria
