= Anglers Rest, Victoria =

Anglers Rest
- Town
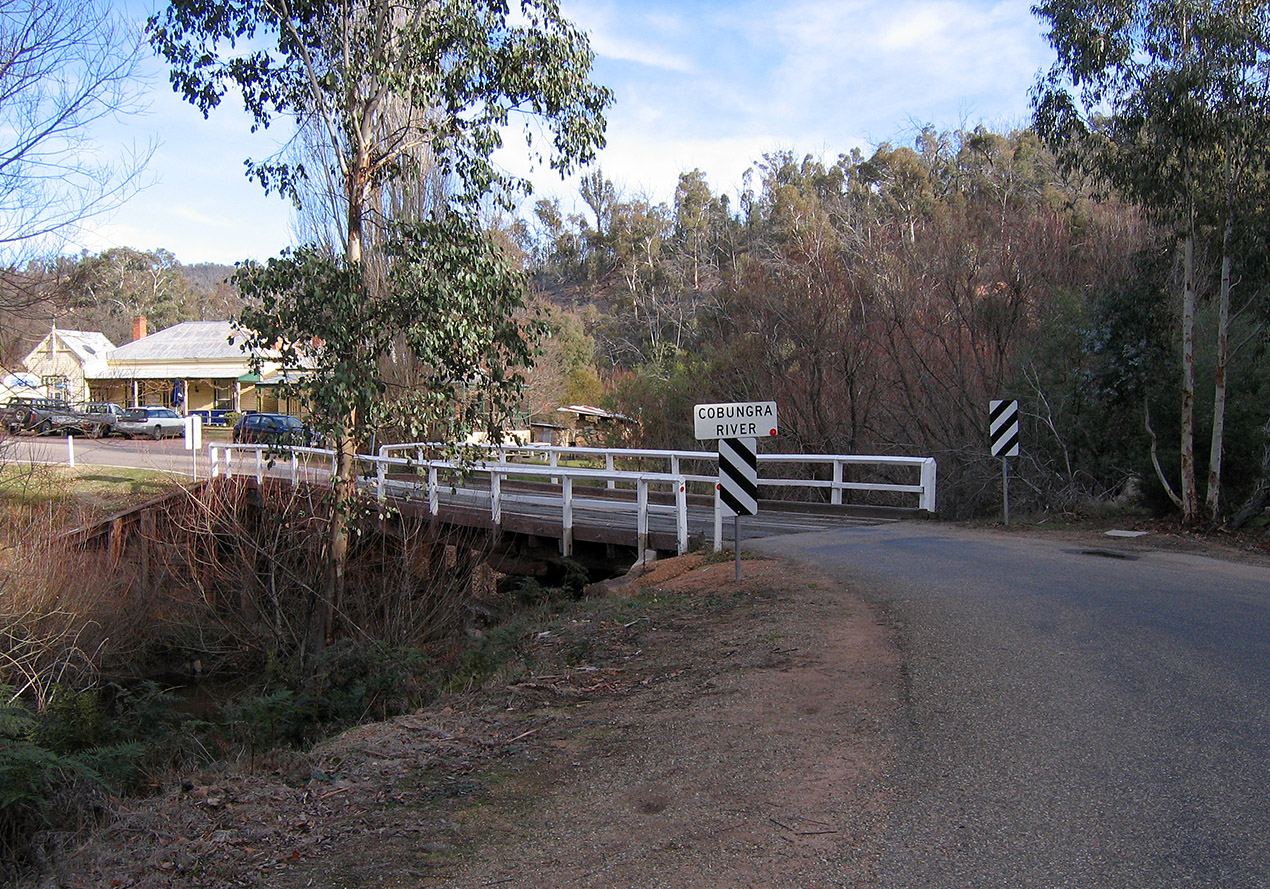
- Omeo Highway bridge crossing of the Cobungra River at Anglers Rest

- Coordinates: 36°59′0″S 147°29′0″E
- Country: Australia
- State: Victoria
- LGA: Shire of East Gippsland
- Location: 430 km (270 mi) from Melbourne; 28.5 km (17.7 mi) from Omeo; 108 km (67 mi) from Bright

Government
  - State electorate: Gippsland East
  - Federal division: Gippsland
- Elevation: 670.0 m (2,198.2 ft)

Population
  - Total: 31 (2021 census)
- Postcode: 3898
- Mean max temp: 18.3 °C (64.9 °F)
- Mean min temp: 4.8 °C (40.6 °F)
- Annual rainfall: 672.6 mm (26.48 in)

Anglers Rest is a locality in Victoria, Australia. It is on the Omeo Highway, 28.5 kilometres (17.7 mi) north of Omeo in the Shire of East Gippsland, almost totally surrounded by the Alpine National Park.

== Location ==
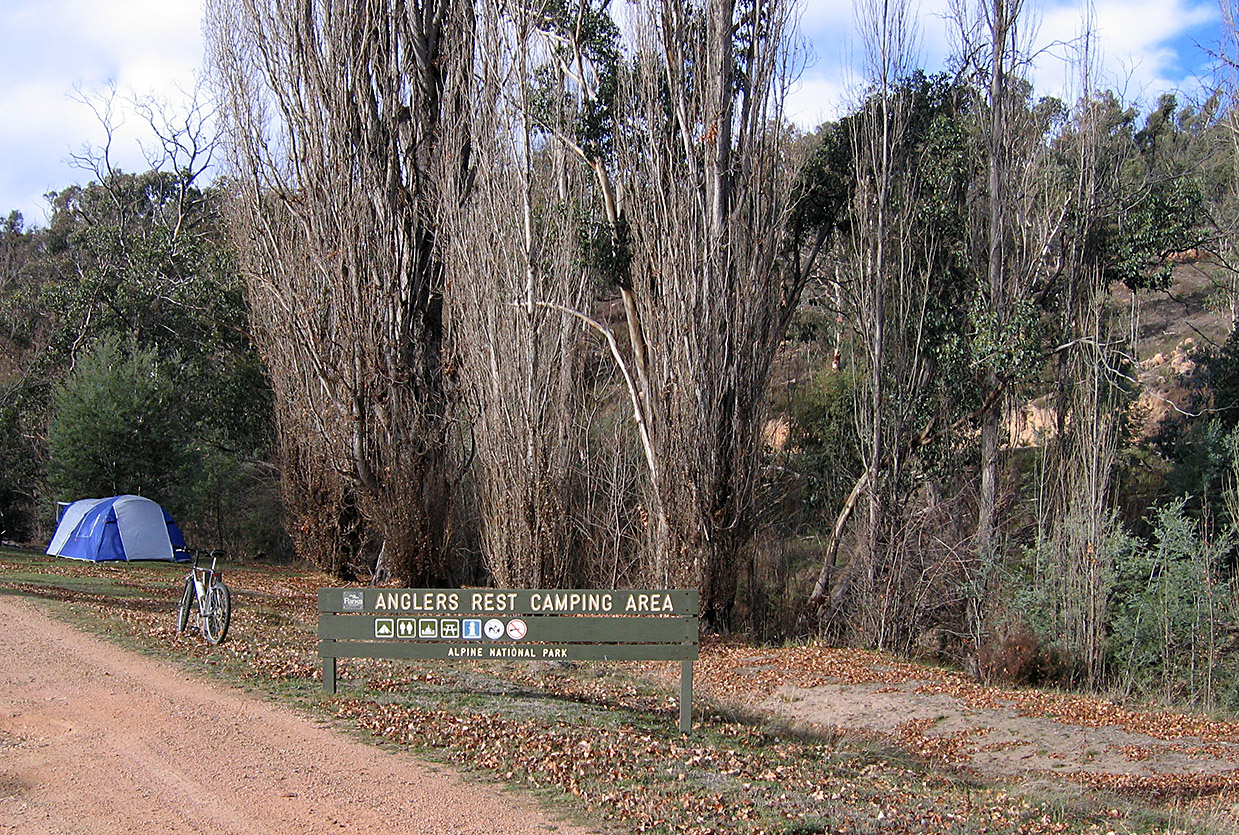
Anglers Rest Camping Area alongside the Cobungra River and Omeo Highway

The name Anglers Rest is descriptive, indicating that the location is a good spot for anglers, being close to the confluence of several noted trout fishing rivers, the Cobungra River, the Bundara River, the Big River, and the Mitta Mitta River. The Bundara River flows into the Big River a few kilometres north of Anglers Rest, and where the Cobungra River joins the Big River just south of Anglers Rest they become the Mitta Mitta River. Besides fishing, the area is also popular for white water rafting, bushwalking, camping, horseriding, and mountain biking.

== The Blue Duck Inn ==
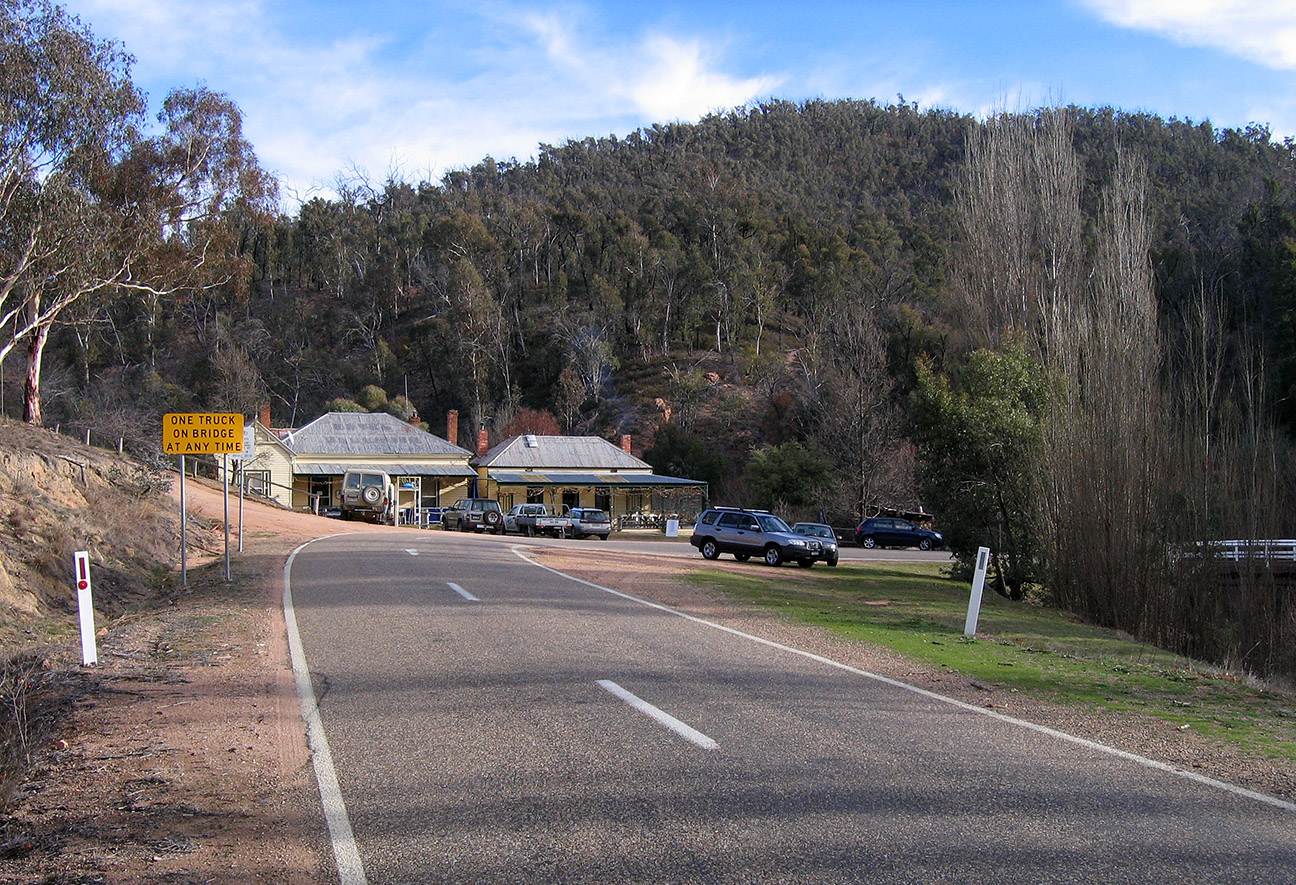
The historic Blue Duck Inn on the Omeo Highway at Anglers Rest

Perhaps the most notable feature of Anglers Rest is the historic Blue Duck Inn, standing alongside the Omeo Highway crossing of the Cobungra River. The local area is in fact commonly referred to simply as 'the blue duck', rather than Anglers Rest, in reference to the prominence of this hotel.

The original 1900 timber slab building operated as a butcher shop, servicing gold miners on what was at the time a walking track from Omeo to the gold fields around Mount Wills. In 1912 a successful miner called Billy O’Connell purchased the establishment and obtained a hotel licence on the understanding that the main road would pass the building. After the road was surveyed this did not eventuate, and the inn gained its name when O'Connell nailed a panning dish out the front and wrote 'Blue Duck' on it, blue duck being the term for a failed gold lease.

In the 1920s O'Connell relocated the hotel to its current location by moving two houses through the bush from Omeo on horse drays; one of these is the current main building of the inn, while the other was placed further up the hill as his home, on the site of the existing cabin accommodation. O'Connell also built a small log building behind the pub, which was staffed for a time by the Education Department as Anglers Rest Primary School (State School Number 4286), mainly to educate O'Connell's own children.

The Blue Duck Inn soon became popular with anglers, who even in those days travelled from as far away as Melbourne for the fishing, including the Chairman of Commissioners on the Victorian Railways, Sir Harold Clapp. Clapp became so enamoured with the inn he arranged for apprentices at the Newport Railway Workshops to cast the bronze blue duck that still stands at the entrance.

The O'Connells moved on in 1946, and the inn went through several hands before declining trade resulted in it relinquishing its liquor licence in 1967. The Blue Duck Inn was eventually refurbished and re-licensed in 1998.

== Bushfires ==
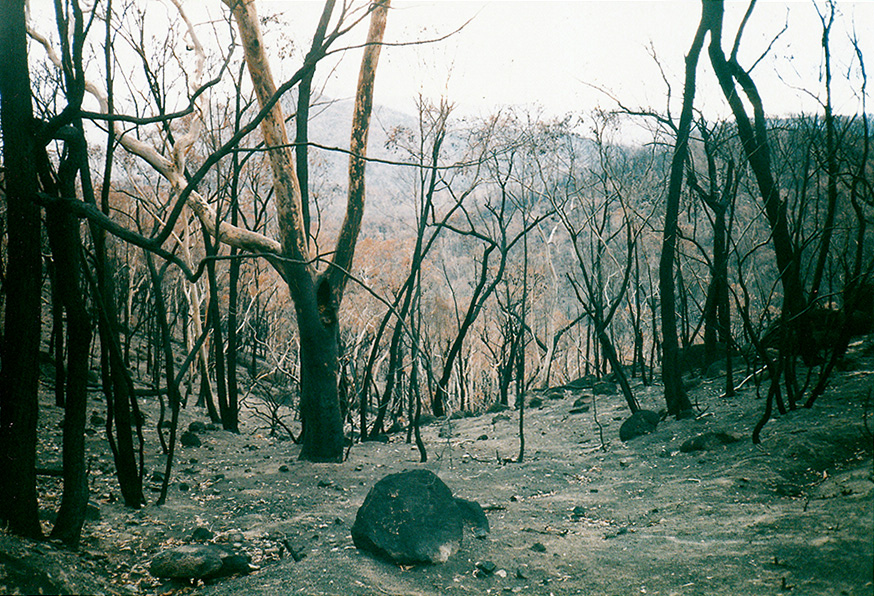
Devastation around Anglers Rest about two months after the 2003 bushfires

The Anglers Rest area was severely impacted by the massive 2003 Eastern Victorian alpine bushfires. While hundreds of square kilometres of the surrounding region was directly affected by the fires for close to two months, an especially intense fire devastated the area around Anglers Rest on 26 January 2003, with several homes being lost, and The Blue Duck Inn barely being saved.

Bushfires again threatened Anglers Rest in early January 2020. Little damage was reported within the village, the fire having stopped in the bush behind the Blue Duck Inn.
