= Griffith Tunnel =

Tunnel in Victoria, Australia

Coordinates: 37°5′52″S 147°35′23″E

Griffith Tunnel is a Victorian gold rush diversion tunnel on Livingston Creek in Omeo, Victoria, Australia. The diversion consists of a 20 m (66 ft) long cutting and a 75 m (246 ft) long tunnel. The large pool at the tunnel entrance is used as a swimming hole.

The tunnel and tail-race was cut by Griffiths and party, through a high rocky bluff known as Frenchman's Hill, on Livingstone Creek opposite Omeo township, in 1868. By diverting the creek waters, the party was able to re-work a large section of the best part of the creek bed.

The site is listed in the Victorian Heritage Inventory.
