= Mount Bogong =

Highest mountain in Victoria, Australia

- Warkwoolowler, Bugung
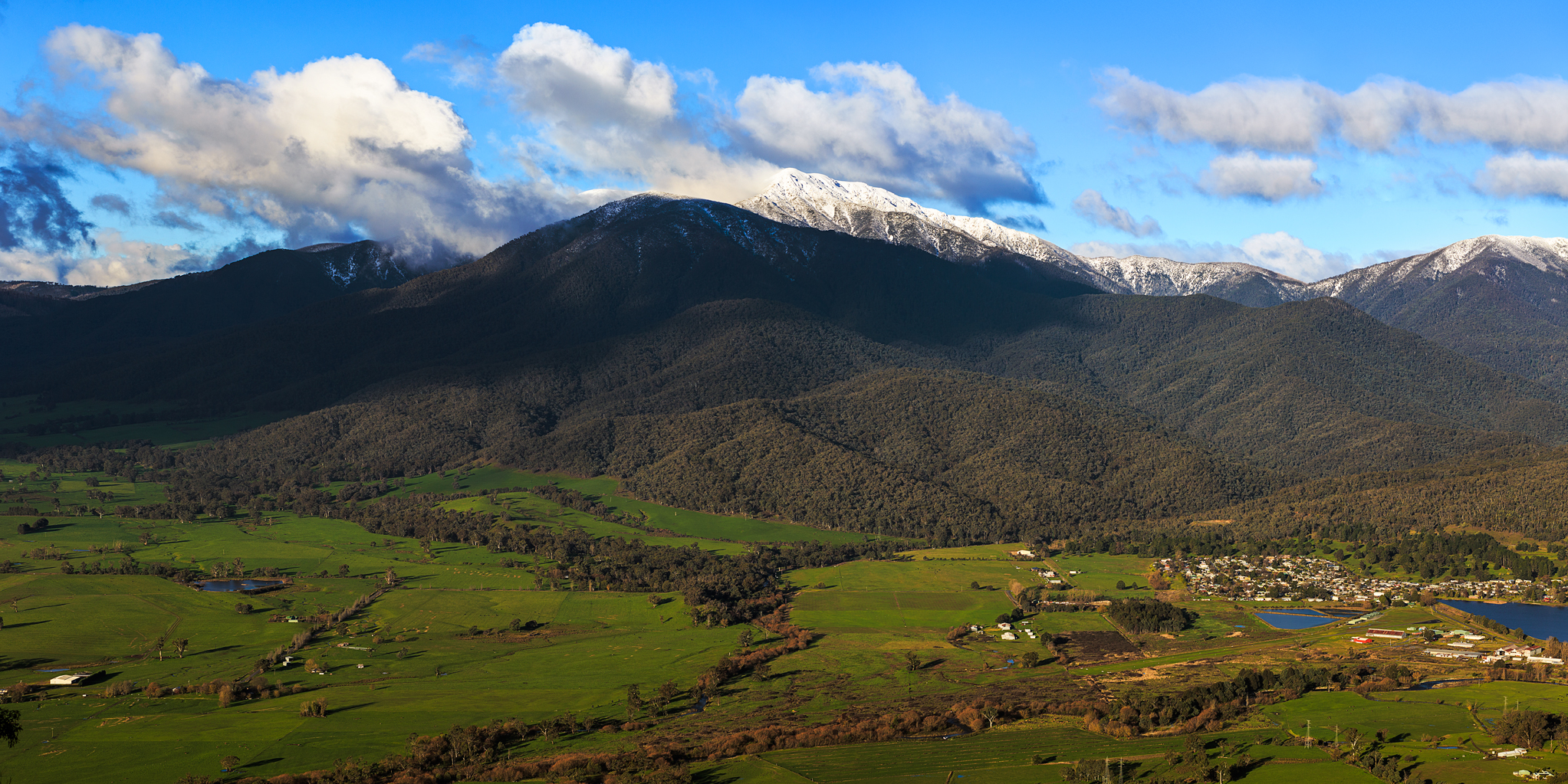
- The western flank of the Mount Bogong massif

Highest point
- Elevation: 1,986 m (6,516 ft)
- Prominence: 1,233 m (4,045 ft)
- Isolation: 87.7 km (54.5 mi)
- Listing: Mountains of Victoria
- Coordinates: 36°43′57″S 147°18′21″E

Naming
- Pronunciation: /ˈboʊɡɒŋ/

Geography
- Location within Alpine Shire
- Location: Victoria, Australia
- Country: Australia
- State: Victoria
- Protected area: Alpine National Park
- Parent range: Victorian Alps, Great Dividing Range

Climbing
- First ascent: 1854 – Baron Sir Ferdinand von Mueller (by a European)
- Easiest route: Staircase Spur

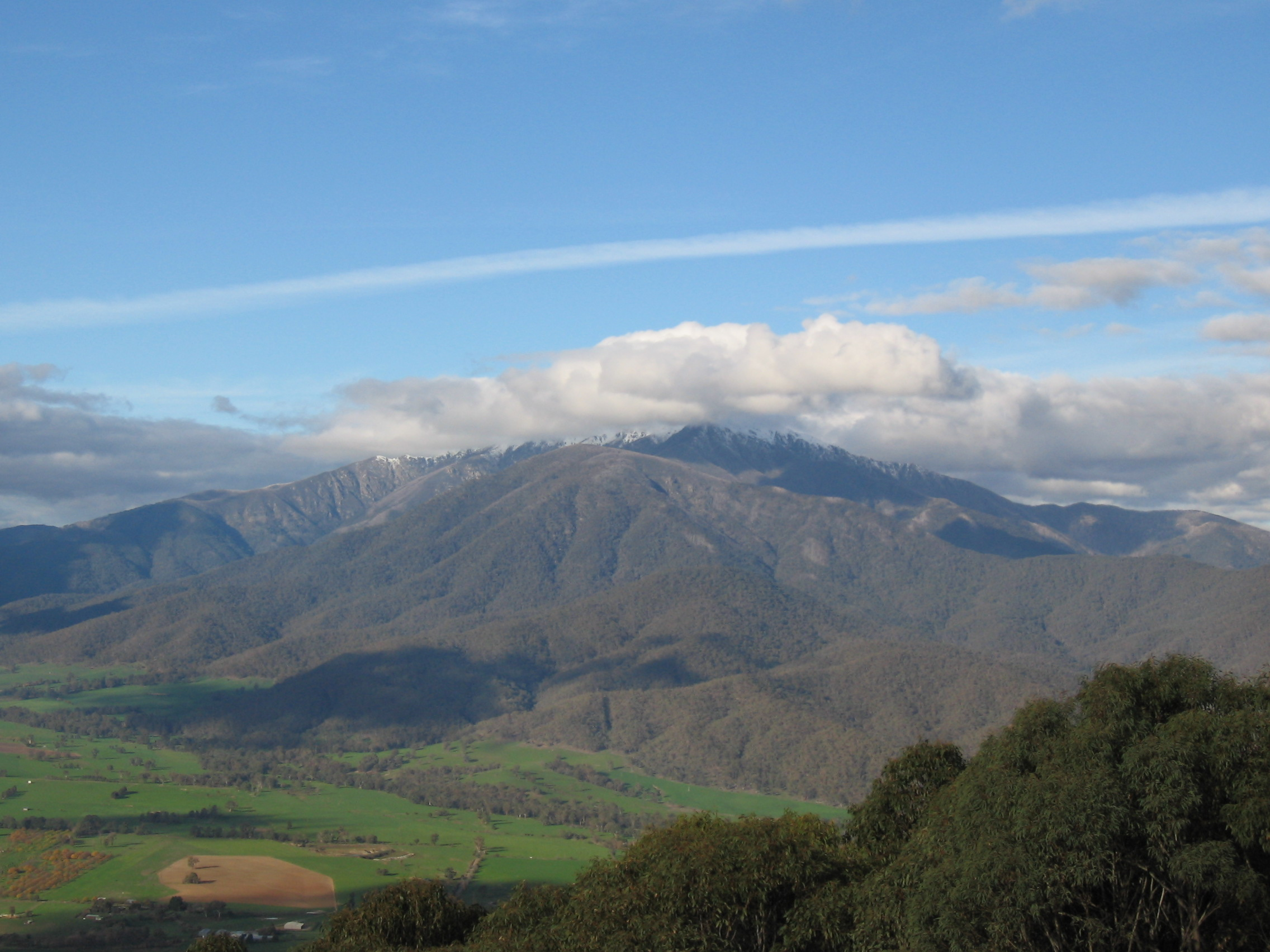
Mount Bogong from Tawonga Gap lookout

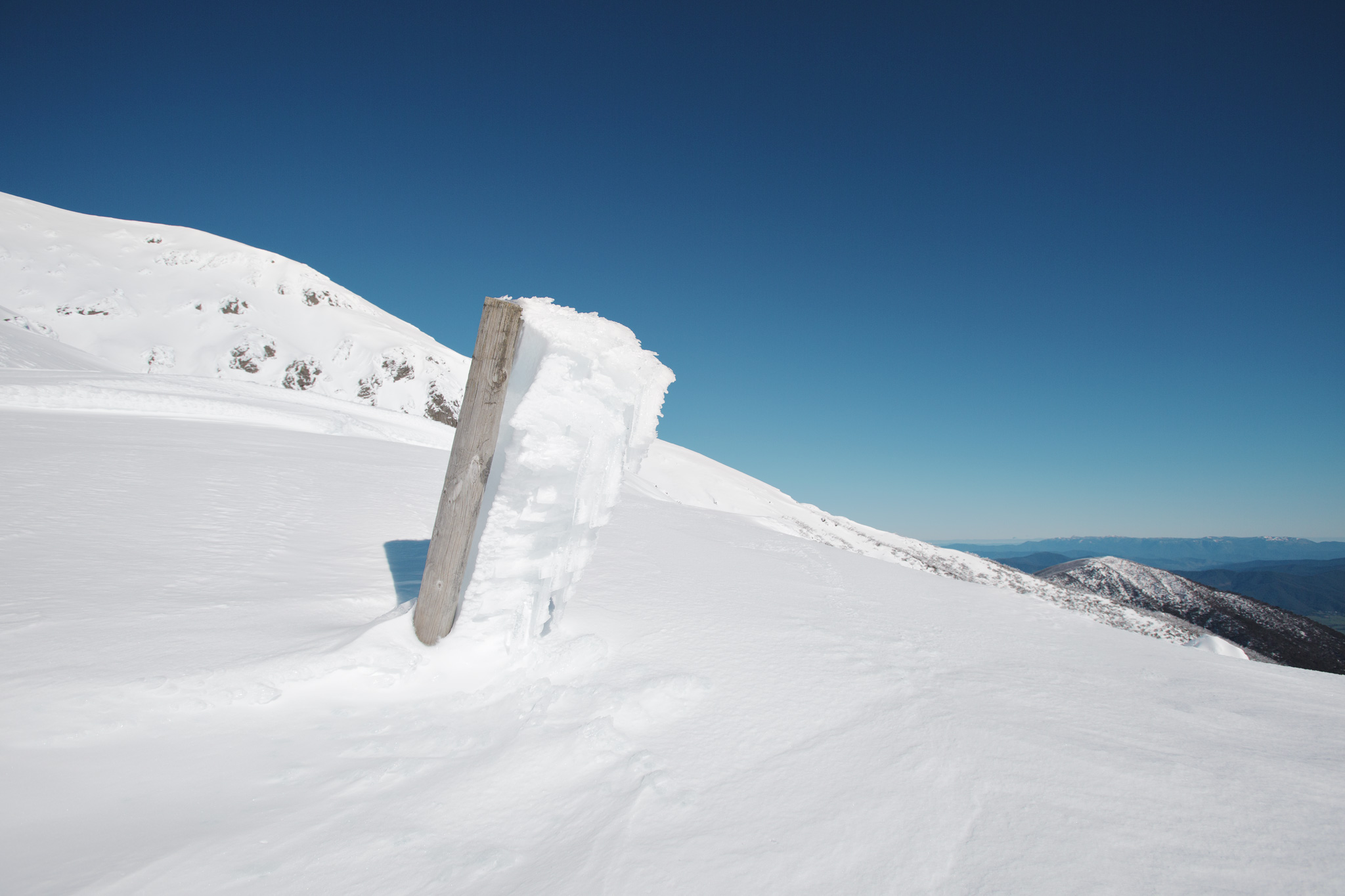
Staircase Spur after the July 2014 blizzards

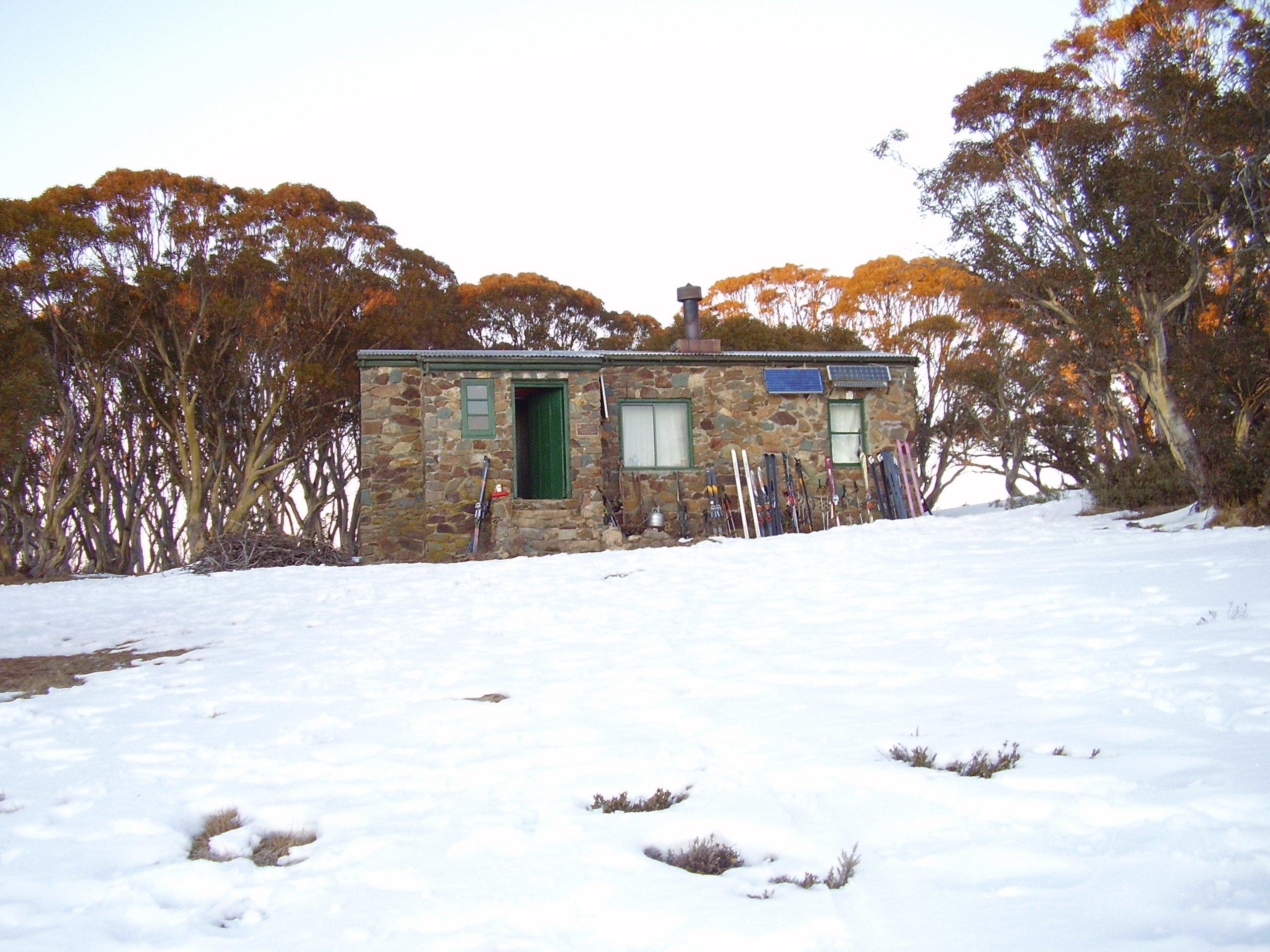
Cleve Cole Hut

Mount Bogong, /ˈboʊɡɒŋ/ located in the Alpine National Park and part of the Victorian Alps of the Great Dividing Range, is the highest mountain in Victoria, Australia, at 1,986 metres (6,516 ft) above sea level.

The Big River valley separates the massif of the mountain from the Bogong High Plains to the south. From the floor of the Kiewa River valley to its summit, Mount Bogong rises 1,650 metres (5,410 ft), making it one of the highest peaks in Australia, not only in terms of its elevation above sea level, but also in terms of local base-to-summit relief.

Mount Bogong is a popular backcountry skiing mountain through winter but only has snow for the mid winter-spring months. It is around 30 kilometres (19 mi) by road and walking track or 12 kilometres (7.5 mi) direct to Mount Beauty. Falls Creek and Mount Hotham ski resorts are also nearby. Camping is relatively safe below the treeline but the summit ridgeline is very exposed and prone to dangerous sudden weather changes including whiteouts and blizzards.

Emergency shelter is also available at Bivouac Hut on the Staircase Spur, and at Cleve Cole, above Camp Creek on the broad ridge to the south of the summit, and Michell's Hut on the Eskdale Spur.

== Etymology ==
In the Australian Aboriginal Waywurru and Dhudhuroa languages, the mountain is named Warkwoolowler, meaning the mountain where Aboriginal people collected the "boo.gong fly". Additionally, in the Dhudhuroa language the word Bugung means the brown moth, referring to Agrotis infusa.

== Flora and fauna ==
The lower slopes of Mount Bogong are covered with tall forests of alpine ash (Eucalyptus delegatensis) to an altitude of about 1,300 metres (4,300 ft). From 1,300 metres (4,300 ft) to 1,800 metres (5,900 ft), woodland and open woodland of snow gum (Eucalyptus pauciflora) dominate, and above 1,800 metres (5,900 ft), the vegetation consists of alpine shrubland, grassland and herbfield.

Animals that live on Mount Bogong have all found some way to adapt to the harsh environment. For example, bogong moths gregariously aestivate in caves throughout the mountain to avoid desiccation. Other animals that live on Mount Bogong include the pygmy possum, smoky mouse, broad toothed rat, powerful owl, spotted tree frog and she-oak skink.

Much of the mountain, especially the northern side, was badly burnt in the 2003 Eastern Victorian alpine bushfires.

== History ==
Mount Bogong towers above the Kiewa River valley and is of great significance to the local traditional owners. Parks Victoria states that

Many Aboriginal people have a remarkably rich history of Aboriginal use in the Victorian Alps and a vast knowledge of the cultural sites, oral history and ancestral stories that relate to the alpine region of Victoria. Throughout the many seasons each year, Aboriginal groups would come from as far away as the coast and south west slopes, to meet with the tribes of the mountains for intertribal ceremonies and feasting on bogong moths. During these festivities they would exchange cultural objects and materials for tools.

According to Eddie Kneebone, an indigenous historian

the Yiatmathong (people) controlled the Kiewa and Mitta Mitta valleys, they also had control of the Alpine region on the Victorian side. Their southernmost boundary extended to Hotham and ran along the highest ridge line of the Alps in an east-west direction. Because Mount Bogong fell within the Yiatmathong territory, permission had to be gained from them by the other tribes participating in the summer feast. Once this was done, the tribes would spend summer in the cooler climate of the mountains feasting on the protein rich Bogong moth.

Kneebone claims that prior to climbing Mount Bogong and the Bogong High Plains, the tribes would gather by the Murray River at Mungabarreena (near modern Albury). After ceremonies, initiations, marriages, trading, settling of disputes, and renewing of alliances and friendships, the groups would walk from Albury to the mountain region to feed on the protein-rich bogong moths.

Following European settlement, indigenous groups were decimated and survivors were placed onto settlements, often far from the traditional lands. Indigenous visitation to Mount Bogong is generally understood to have finished by the mid–19th century. While there was cattle grazing for some time, it was the walkers and then skiers who became the next group to visit the mountain in large numbers.

In August 1936 Mick Hull, Howard Michell and Cleve Cole attempted the first winter crossing of the Bogong High Plains. The group became lost in blizzard conditions and Cole died of hypothermia soon after he and Mick Hull were discovered by a rescue party raised by Michell. Cole was buried on 22 August at the Cheltenham Pioneer Cemetery. The hut commemorating Cole's life was completed in 1938, and has served as the hub of back-country skiing and bushwalking exploration of the Bogong area since. Accommodation at the hut is free on a first-in-first-served basis, although donations to The Bogong Club are welcomed. Parks Victoria advises skiers and walkers to carry an alpine-capable tent, and not to rely on accommodation in the huts.

Cole's death illustrates the danger of Mount Bogong and of the Victorian Alps in general. The mountains are geologically old and worn. Their low altitude and flattish, rounded tops make for easy skiing and walking, but descent of their steep sides in whiteout conditions can be perilous.

== Ascent routes ==
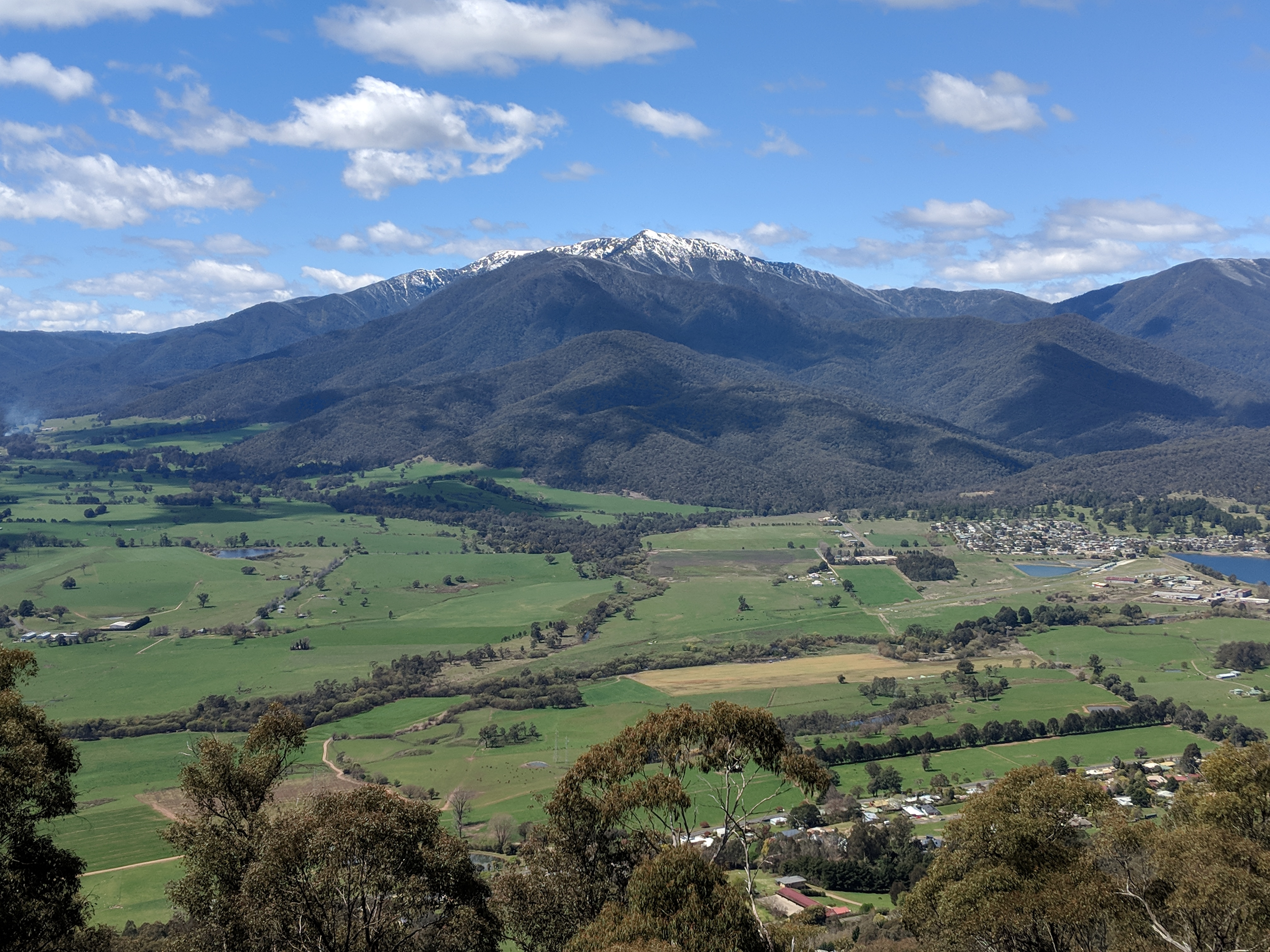
Mount Bogong in the spring

There are many routes up Mount Bogong for hikers, including (clockwise from north west) Staircase Spur, Eskdale Spur, Granite Flat Spur, Long Spur, Duane Spur, and Quartz Ridge. All involve a climb of more than 600 metres (2,000 ft) from the saddle or creek at the base of these spurs.

The two main walking trails lead to the summit. The Staircase and Eskdale Spur can both be accessed from a trail that begins at Mountain Creek Picnic Area. It is also possible to access Camp Creek Gap on the Eskdale Spur in a four-wheel drive (4WD) vehicle along Eskdale Spur Track from Trappers Gap. Both trails are of moderate difficulty. Starting from the picnic area, the Staircase is a 16 kilometres (9.9 mi) return trip, normally taking 6–9 hours return, while the Eskdale Spur is a 20 kilometres (12 mi) return trip, normally taking 8–11 hours return.

The Staircase Spur is a difficult ascent due to its steep slopes. From the base of the staircase it is 6 kilometres (3.7 mi) to the summit. Halfway up the staircase is Bivouac Hut, which sits about 3 kilometres (1.9 mi) from the summit on a small flat section, it offers emergency refuge, camp sites and a resting spot before heading to the summit.

The Eskdale spur may provide a slightly easier option up to the summit of Bogong with a 4WD vehicle, although walking up from Mountain Creek, it is just a longer way to do the same ascent. With a 4WD it is possible to drive from the bottom of the Staircase Spur at Mountain Creek, through to Camp Creek Gap, from where it is about 2.5 hrs walk to the summit of Bogong, and this is the easiest winter access, although occasionally the 4WD track is covered with snow.

Just over halfway up the Eskdale Spur is Michell Hut, which burnt down during the 2003 bushfires but was later rebuilt. Michell Hut provides emergency refuge, toilet, camp sites and a resting area before the final climb up to where the Eskdale meets Granite Flat Spur at the treeline, where there is also a good, but exposed campsite.

Granite Flat Spur also provides access to the summit. It can be accessed by 4WD either from Eskdale, or by continuing on from Camp Creek Gap around the 4WD track, which is only possible outside of winter. An hour beyond Camp Creek Gap by 4WD is the end of the 4WD track, from which it takes about 1.5 hrs walk to the summit (i.e. it is no quicker than walking up the Eskdale, but with less walking, and more driving).

Above the treeline, both the Staircase and Eskdale Spurs are very exposed, particularly in winter, and they may "ice up" after about 4pm, making progress dangerous.

== See also ==
- Australian Alps
- Australian Alps National Parks and Reserves
- List of mountains of Australia
- Skiing in Australia
- Skiing in Victoria, Australia
