= Omeo =

- Town
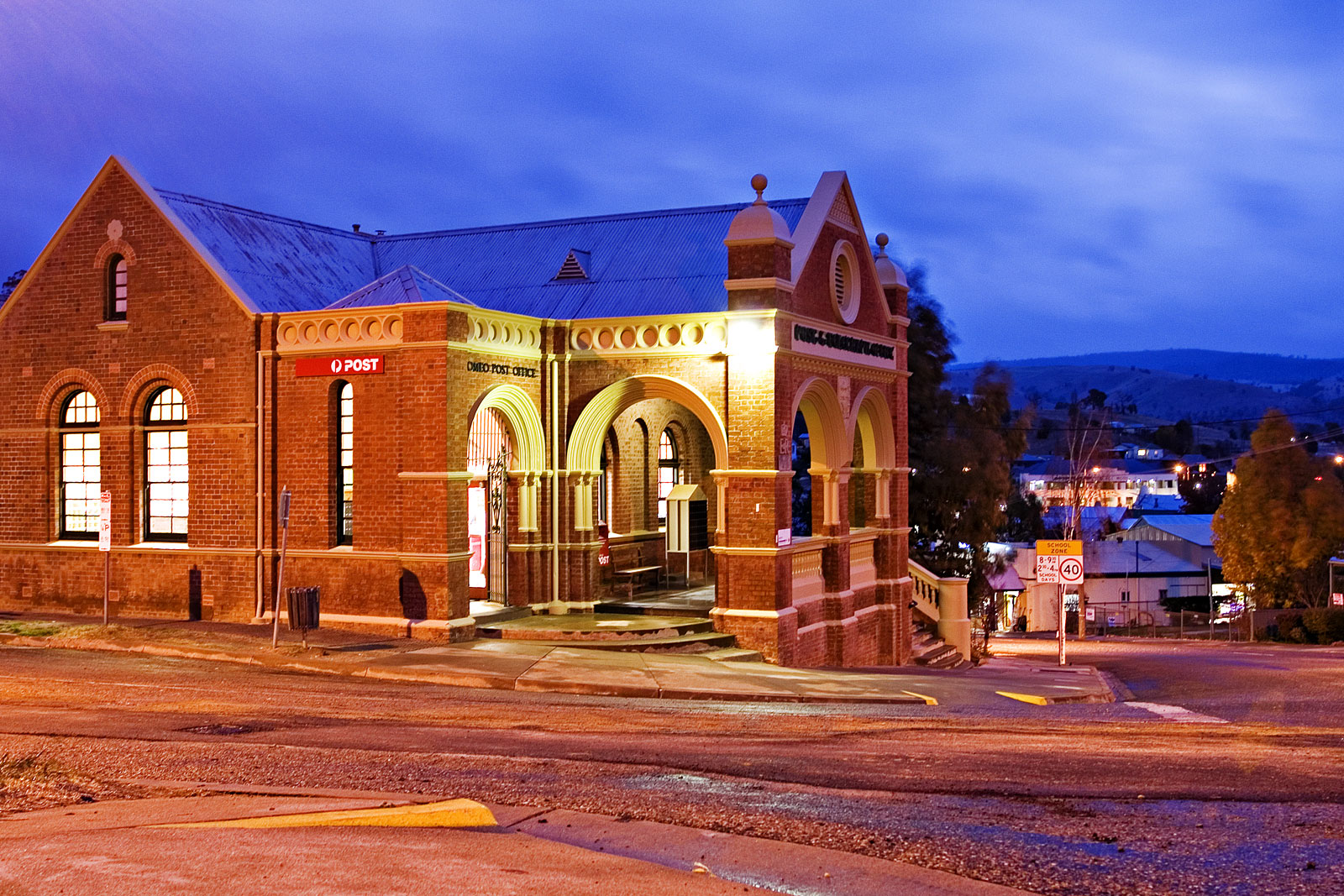
- The historic Omeo Post office by night

- Interactive map of Omeo
- Coordinates: 37°06′0″S 147°36′0″E
- Country: Australia
- State: Victoria
- LGA: Shire of East Gippsland
- Location: 402 km (250 mi) from Melbourne; 121 km (75 mi) from Bairnsdale; 110 km (68 mi) from Bright

Government
  - State electorate: Gippsland East
  - Federal division: Gippsland
- Elevation: 685.0 m (2,247.4 ft)

Population
  - Total: 406 (2016 census)
- Postcode: 3898
- Mean max temp: 18.3 °C (64.9 °F)
- Mean min temp: 4.8 °C (40.6 °F)
- Annual rainfall: 673.6 mm (26.52 in)

Omeo (/ˈoʊmiːoʊ/ OH-mee-oh) is a town in Victoria, Australia on the Great Alpine Road, east of Mount Hotham, in the Shire of East Gippsland. At the 2016 census, Omeo had a population of 406. The name is derived from an Aboriginal word for 'mountains' or 'hills'. Omeo is affectionately known as the City of the Alps with many historic buildings remaining in the town. The town is still the commercial hub for the Omeo Region and is a service centre for outlying communities such as Benambra, Cobungra, Cassilis, Swifts Creek, and Ensay.

== History ==
The first reported sighting by Europeans of the wide plain that Indigenous peoples referred to as 'Omeo' was by the naturalist John Lhotsky from the southern Alps in 1834. The area was first visited by stockmen who drove stock through the region as early as 1835. In 1845 gold was found in the Livingstone Creek which runs through Omeo, this caused the population to boom and by 1901, Omeo was at its peak with a population of 9400. They were prosperous times. The main street, Day Avenue, was packed every night with people out strolling, shopping and enjoying the evening air. Hotels and cafes were doing a roaring trade with free-spending miners, and businesses were booming. Businesses began to establish themselves. Banks arrived. In 1889, the Colonial Bank of Australia. In 1892, the Commercial Bank. A.J. McDonald, one of the colony's leading architects designed the post and telegraph office and new courthouse. They were completed in 1891 and 1892 and remain unique for their architecture to this day.

The Post Office near its present location opened on 1 January 1858. However, two earlier offices in different locations named Omeo were open in 1851 and 1856 to 1857.

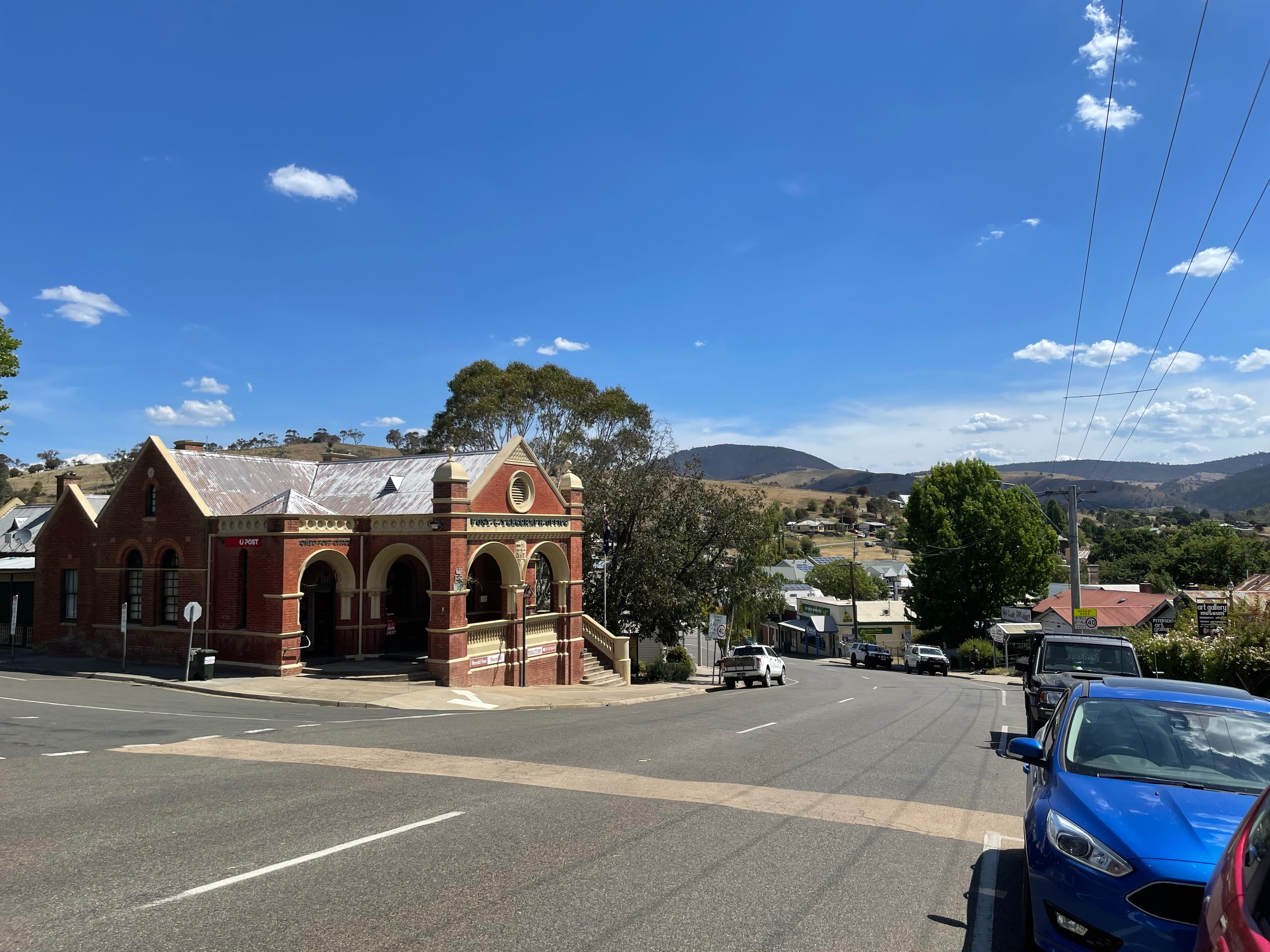
Omeo Post Office by day

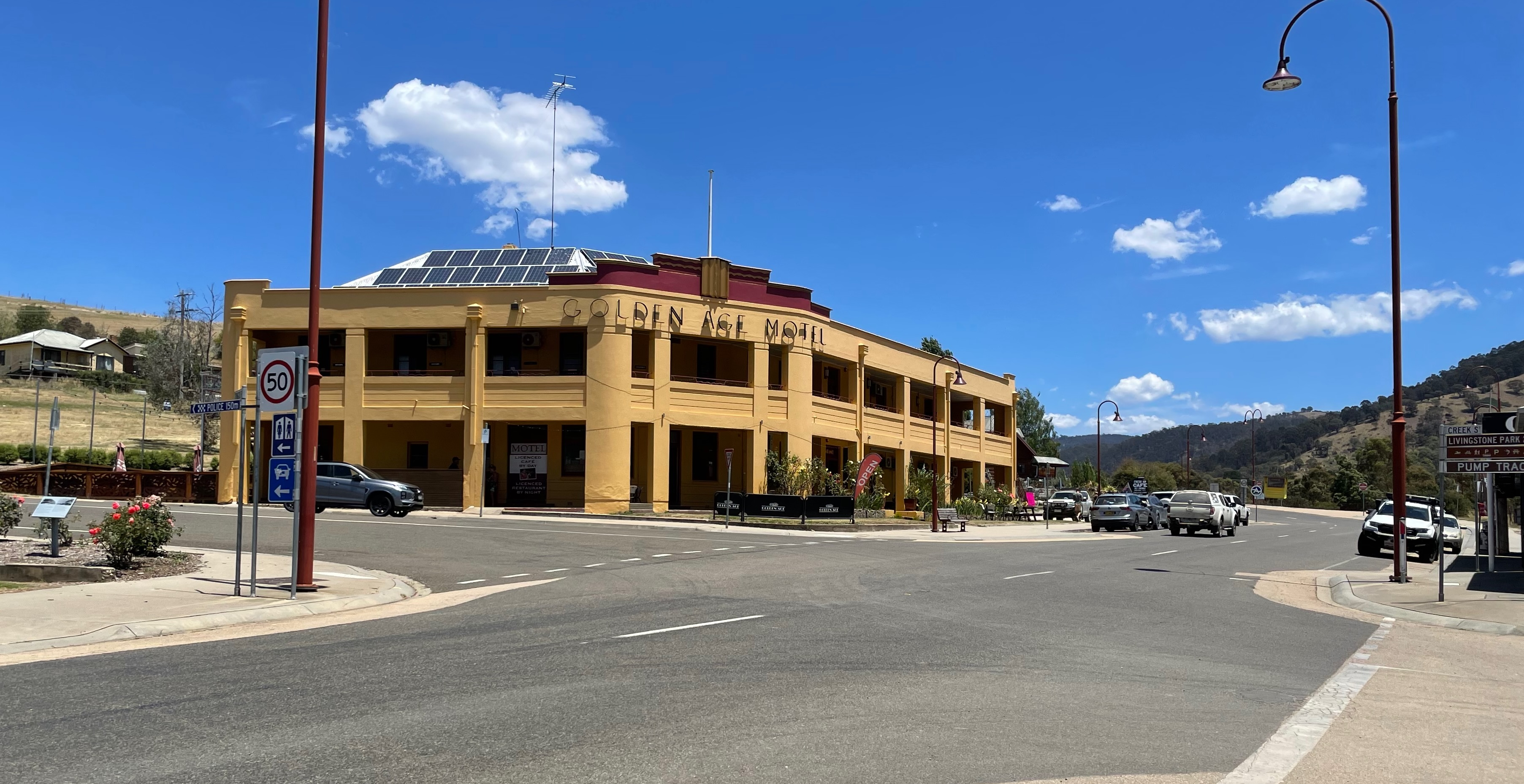
The fifth Golden Age Hotel, Omeo, Victoria

Earthquakes in 1885 and 1892, and the Black Friday bushfires of 1939, destroyed many buildings; many remain including the historical Omeo Bank House as well as the Omeo Coffee House which was built in 1879 and was a temperance boarding house as well as a restaurant, it is a timber building which was condemned in 1990, restored in 1990 and completed in 1995 when it housed its first guests after 25 years. It is now known as Snug as a Bug Motel.

== Gold ==
In 1851 Reverend W B Clark, a noted geologist reported that he had found evidence of gold in quantities that would make the mining of it economically feasible. Alluvial deposits of gold were found in tributaries of the Livingstone Creek, and by the end of 1854, over 200 men were camped along its banks digging for gold, most of it was found within a metre or so of the surface. The Oriental Claims area alone produced an estimated 58,000 ounces of gold. By 1855, most of the shallow alluvial gold had been mined and the process of hydro-sluicing was introduced to the Omeo goldfields. In an operation that took nine months to complete a water race was constructed along the mountain slopes for a distance of almost nineteen kilometres. Giant flumes crossed gullies and ravines with the water arriving at about 190 feet above the creek and the alluvial deposits. Races were cut from almost every stream that could supply water. In the process, water blasted away the alluvial gold-containing gravel and the gravel slush was channelled into rows of wooden sluice boxes and the gold ore collected.

The first venture into quartz mining was at the Dry Gully field with the first battery being established at Mountain Creek. People came from all over the district to see a local identity, Miss Rogers, smash a large bottle of champagne over the wheel as it started up, and christen it the Mountain Maid. Bullock teams hauled multi-headed batteries up the mountains and across the alps to work the new-found reefs. Smile of Fortune, Rip Van Winkel, Happy Go Lucky, The Joker, and Inexhaustible were some of the names given to the many reef mines that opened up.

== The town today ==
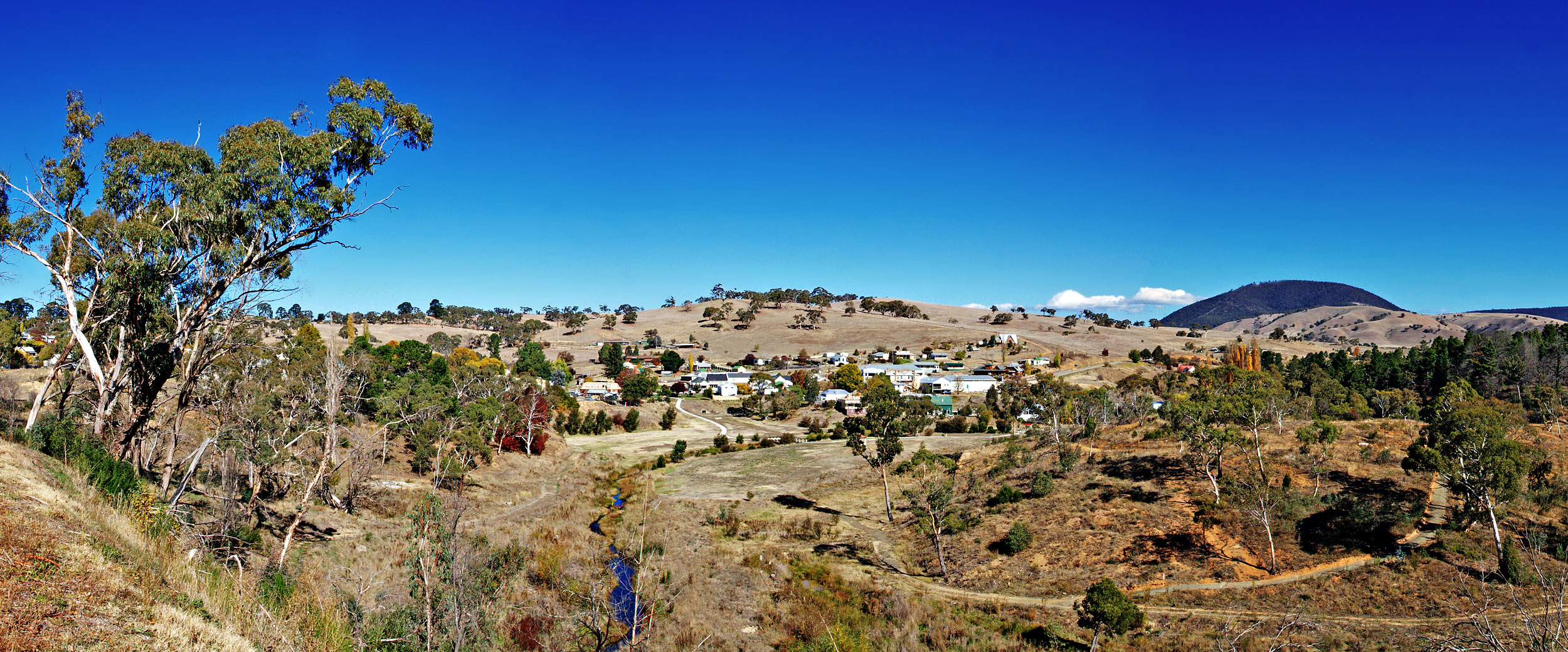
Omeo Town centre from the old Omeo Highway during a drought period

The town hosts a range of events including the Mountain Calf Sales and Hinnomunjie Picnic Races in March, an Easter Saturday Rodeo with a town market held at the courthouse gardens prior to the event, Easter Sunday Polo Match at Cobungra Station (20 minutes), Caravan & RV Muster and an Agricultural Show in November.

The town has a range of services including a Hospital, Chemist, Transport Services, Supermarket, Post Office, Shire Services, Banking, Engineering & Mechanical, and a range of Food & Accommodation outlets.

Attractions include the Justice Precinct which includes a working Court House built in 1893, the Oriental Claims, the Cuckoo Clock shop, and white water rafting on the Mitta Mitta River. The Cobungra River, Bundara River, Big River and Mitta Mitta River around nearby Anglers Rest, as well as the Tambo River, all provide good trout fishing.

The Australian thriller Red Hill was filmed in and around the town. "Red Hill" tells the story of a fictional town, Red Hill and an escaped convict returning to the town to seek revenge on those who helped convict him.

== Transport ==
There are bus routes from Bright and Bairnsdale. The Bairnsdale bus runs weekdays, once both directions, and the Bright bus (Alps Link) timetable is less frequent in Summer and runs additional services during the ski season. Alps Link is the highest altitude public bus in Australia. The town sits at the junction of the Omeo Highway and the Great Alpine Road.

== Climate ==
Due to its inland, valley location at a southern latitude, Omeo has a cool oceanic climate (Cfb) with four distinct seasons and a high diurnal range much of the year, with chilly nights year-round. It regularly experiences frost in summer—something which is unheard of in the southern hemisphere at such a relatively low elevation and modest latitude. Snowfalls are common from May to October, but are generally light and short-lived due to a partial foehn effect.

The lowest temperature in Victoria was recorded at Omeo (along with Falls Creek in July 1970); a reading of −11.7 °C (10.9 °F) on 15 June 1965. The town is exceptionally dry by eastern Victorian standards, being encompassed by great mountains on all sides. Despite the dryness, it only records 62.4 clear days annually and 128.4 cloudy days, as the town is susceptible to cold fronts off the Bass Strait.

Climate data for Omeo Comparison (1879–2009, extremes 1957–2009); 685 m AMSL; 37.10° S, 147.60° E
Month	Jan	Feb	Mar	Apr	May	Jun	Jul	Aug	Sep	Oct	Nov	Dec	Year
Record high °C (°F)	40.2 (104.4)	40.0 (104.0)	36.7 (98.1)	31.1 (88.0)	23.9 (75.0)	20.2 (68.4)	19.0 (66.2)	21.8 (71.2)	26.8 (80.2)	30.1 (86.2)	36.4 (97.5)	36.6 (97.9)	40.2 (104.4)
Mean daily maximum °C (°F)	26.1 (79.0)	25.7 (78.3)	23.0 (73.4)	18.6 (65.5)	14.2 (57.6)	10.8 (51.4)	10.2 (50.4)	12.0 (53.6)	15.1 (59.2)	18.3 (64.9)	21.5 (70.7)	24.2 (75.6)	18.3 (65.0)
Mean daily minimum °C (°F)	9.6 (49.3)	9.6 (49.3)	7.8 (46.0)	4.9 (40.8)	2.4 (36.3)	0.9 (33.6)	−0.1 (31.8)	0.7 (33.3)	2.7 (36.9)	4.6 (40.3)	6.5 (43.7)	8.2 (46.8)	4.8 (40.7)
Record low °C (°F)	−1.4 (29.5)	−1.8 (28.8)	−2.1 (28.2)	−6.1 (21.0)	−7.8 (18.0)	−11.7 (10.9)	−10.0 (14.0)	−8.4 (16.9)	−7.2 (19.0)	−5.0 (23.0)	−2.8 (27.0)	−2.2 (28.0)	−11.7 (10.9)
Average precipitation mm (inches)	51.9 (2.04)	51.8 (2.04)	52.7 (2.07)	45.1 (1.78)	50.4 (1.98)	56.3 (2.22)	52.2 (2.06)	56.0 (2.20)	61.5 (2.42)	70.1 (2.76)	64.8 (2.55)	60.1 (2.37)	673.6 (26.52)
Average precipitation days (≥ 0.2 mm)	7.8	6.9	8.1	8.8	11.2	12.6	13.2	13.3	12.5	12.3	10.4	9.1	126.2
Average afternoon relative humidity (%)	43	45	49	54	61	67	65	59	54	52	50	46	54

== Education ==
Omeo Primary School (No 831) is the oldest school in the region and was established in 1866 and celebrated its 150th anniversary in 2016. Until 1977 the school was once a Primary and Higher Elementary School, with enrolments around 100 students. The town also previously had a Catholic School with an enrolment of 80 students.

Today the school has approximately 50 students. The school also offers an annual Ski Program for its students which is unique to places located close to the snowfields.

== Sports and recreation ==
The town has an Australian rules football team competing in the Omeo & District Football League (ODFL), as well as an affiliated netball team competing in the associated netball competition. They fielded senior and junior football teams, and senior, junior and midget netball teams, and had the club colours of Maroon and White. In 2007 the football and netball clubs merged with neighbouring town Benambra, to form the Omeo-Benambra (Alpine Ranges) Club. The new club colours are blue, teal and white, with the logo and jumpers showing teal snow-peaked mountains separated by a blue river under a blue sky.

Omeo has a horse racing club, the Omeo District Racing Club, whose one picnic meeting a year is the Hinnomunjie Cup meeting held at nearby Hinnomunjie in March.

Omeo has a 9 Hole Grassed Green golf course located on Stanley Drive, 5 minutes from the town centre.

Omeo boasts new and updated sporting facilities including tennis & netball courts, a football oval and a recreation reserve complete with a function room and commercial kitchen.

On weekends the town is often visited by motorcyclists taking advantage of the fine weather to ride the Great Alpine Road.

Plans are currently underway by the labour government to install 121km of mountain biking trails to transform Omeo into a world-class mountain biking destination. Works are due to be completed in March 2023.

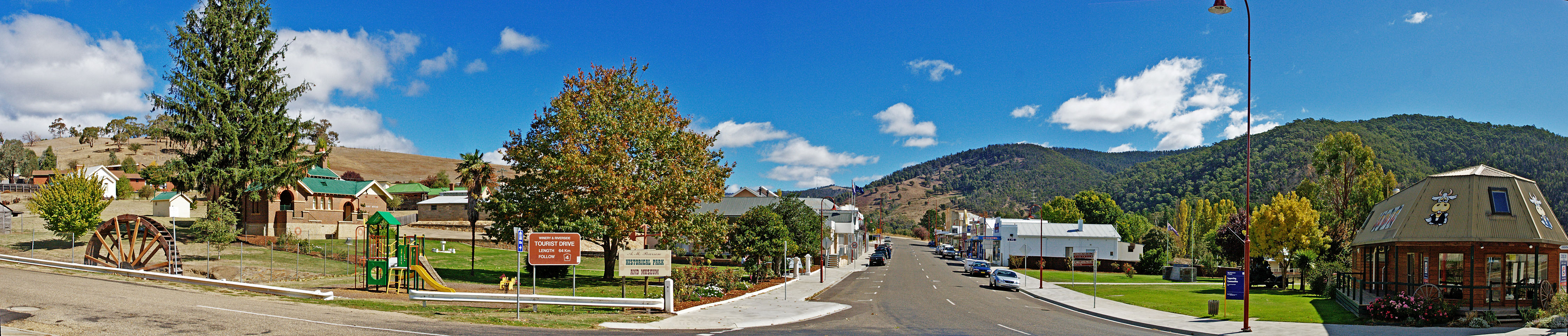
Omeo town centre from the Primary School

== See also ==
- Griffith Tunnel
