= Alpine National Park =

National park in Victoria, Australia

- IUCN category II (national park)
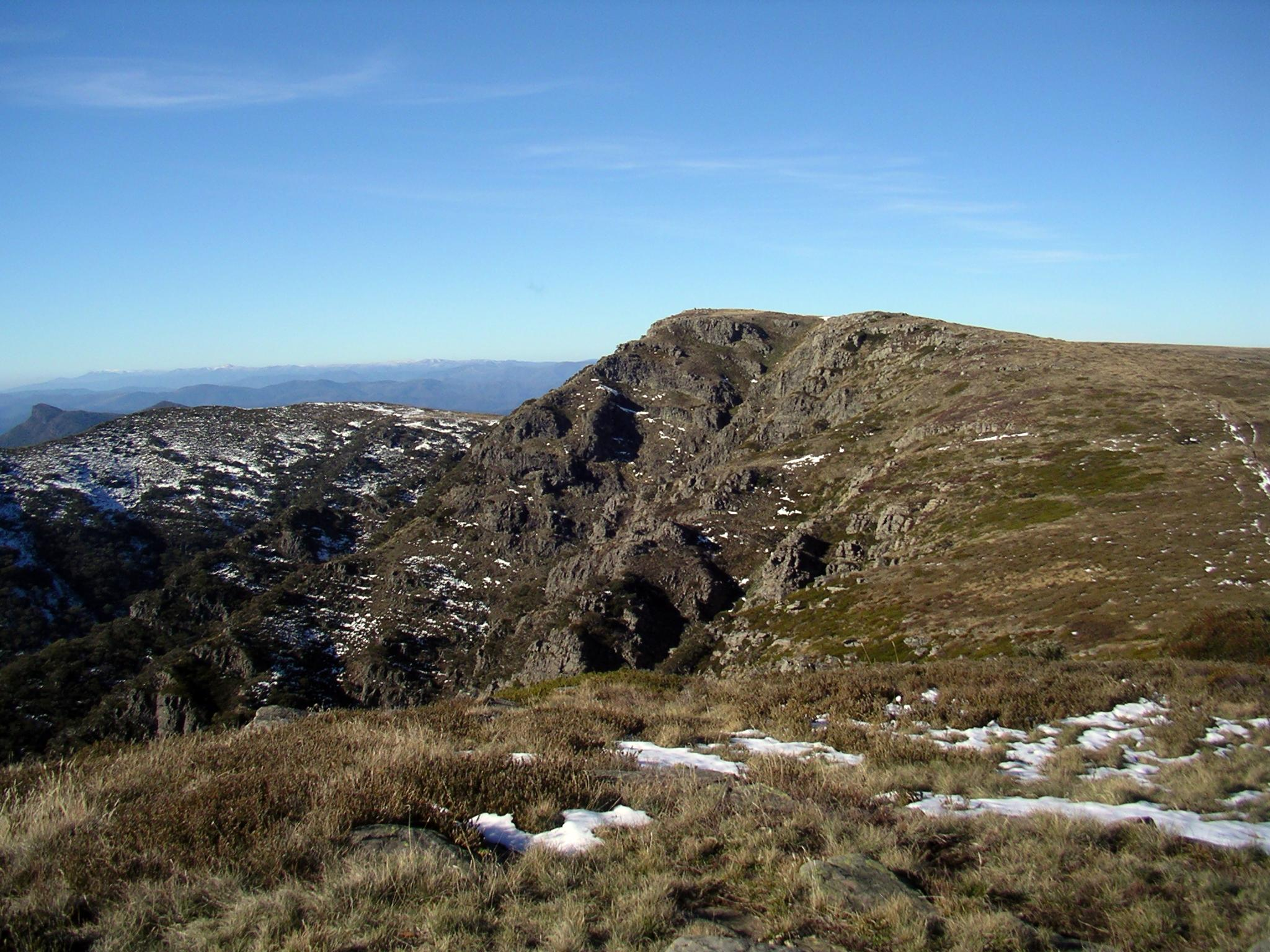
- The summit of Mount Howitt taken from West Peak

- Location within Victoria
- Location: Victoria
- Nearest city: Omeo
- Coordinates: m 37°20′15″S 146°45′24″E
- Area: 6,474 km^{2} (2,500 sq mi)
- Established: 1989
- Governing body: Parks Victoria
- Website: https://www.parks.vic.gov.au/places-to-see/parks/alpine-national-park

The Alpine National Park is a national park located in the Central Highlands and Alpine regions of Victoria, Australia. The 646,000-hectare (1,600,000-acre) national park is located northeast of Melbourne. It is the largest National Park in Victoria, and covers much of the higher areas of the Great Dividing Range in Victoria, including Victoria's highest point, Mount Bogong at 1,986 metres (6,516 ft) and the associated subalpine woodland and grassland of the Bogong High Plains. The park's north-eastern boundary is along the border with New South Wales, where it abuts the Kosciuszko National Park. On 7 November 2008 the Alpine National Park was added to the Australian National Heritage List as one of eleven areas constituting the Australian Alps National Parks and Reserves.

== Ecology ==
Ecologically, Alpine refers to areas where the environment is such that trees are unable to grow and vegetation is restricted to dwarfed shrubs, alpine grasses and ground-hugging herbs. In Victoria this is roughly those areas above 1,800 metres (5,900 ft) AHD. Below this is the sub-alpine zone, an area of open forest dominated by snow-gums, with significant areas of grasslands. This zone includes basins where cold air settles, restricting tree growth. In wetter areas these basins form Sphagnum bogs, which play an important role in the water cycle.

Water enters the alps as snow or rain. Bogs and frost hollows collect the water as snow melt and run off. A key element of these bogs is Sphagnum Moss, which acts as a sponge, absorbing up to twenty times its weight in water. These bogs then release the water over summer, ensuring creeks flow throughout most of the year maintaining the alps' creeks and streams. The greatest risk to this system is damage to the Sphagnum bogs. Trampling by feral animals (pigs, cattle, horses, humans) reduces their ability to absorb and then release water; instead of a steady release, water flows increase significantly in spring, leading to erosion and scouring of river beds, and ceases over summer and autumn, leading to localised drought. Fire can remove riparian vegetation, also increasing run-off and erosion. Alpine sphagnum bogs and associated fens are listed as endangered under the Environment Protection and Biodiversity Conservation Act 1999.

Below the sub-alpine zone is the montane zone. On the alps southern fall, this exists as wet forest and rainforest, a consequence of the higher rainfall on this side of the park. Tall forests of alpine ash and mountain ash grow in deep soils while species like mountain gum are found in shallower soils or drier sites. The understory is usually shrubby, with a dense ground-layer of grasses, lilies, ferns and the like.

Rainforests are areas where the canopy cover is high, greater than 70%. The tree species are often specialists, such as myrtle beech in cool temperate rainforest and lilly pilly in warm temperate rainforest. Rainforest species are shade tolerant and able to regenerate below an undisturbed canopy or in small gaps created when a tree falls. Rainforest often merges with the surrounding, usually damp or wet, eucalypt forests. These forests are home to a diverse bird life and many mammals, some of which are restricted to a particular ecological niche within the ecosystem. This can include particular vegetation for foraging, or the presence of older trees with their larger hollows, a requirement for some arboreal mammals and birds. Rainforest species regenerate without fire and may be intolerant to fire, while other eucalypt species require fire. Fire can also affect the breeding of some mammals. Fire in spring, for example, is considered to put juvenile spot-tailed quolls at risk. The montane zone on the alps drier, northern fall consists of dry forest and woodland with eucalypt species such as stringybarks, boxes and peppermints. Dry forest and woodlands also surround the wet forests on the southern side of the alps. These forests provide habitat for a wide range of species.

Dry forest and woodland abut private land in many areas and as a consequence have been subject to clearing, modification and fragmentation. Thus, the major threat in these areas is fire management (protection of private assets is a key objective and so past fire regimes may not reflect environmental needs), weed invasion and lack of connectivity between patches.

=== Fauna ===
The national park protects many threatened species, including the spotted tree frog, she-oak skink, smoky mouse, broad-toothed mouse and mountain pygmy possum.

Alpine Bogs and Associated Fens have now been listed as a threatened ecological community by the Australian government.

== Bushfires ==
The park has been affected by bushfires with lightning strikes starting large fires in January 2003 and again in December 2006, each fire burning over 10,000 square kilometres (3,900 sq mi) over a number of weeks. The largest previous fire was the Black Friday fires of 1939. While fire is a feature of most Australian ecosystems, some alpine ecosystems, such as Alpine Bogs and Fens, are susceptible due to the sensitivity of the component species. The 2003 fires created a mosaic of burnt and unburnt areas. In some areas where the 2006–07 fires burnt over the same ground, species and communities have struggled to recover. A lightning strike on the slopes of Mount Feathertop near Harrietville in January 2013 started a 35,000-hectare (86,000-acre) bushfire which burnt for around two months.

== Agriculture ==
For much of the European history of the national park, agricultural activity was conducted in the park, with quotas of cattle allowed to graze on the High Plains during summer. Australia's alpine area was first used for grazing around the 1840s. Concerns about the environmental effects led various governments to remove grazing from parts of the alps over the next century. Grazing was temporarily halted in Mount Buffalo National Park in the 1920s and stopped altogether in 1952. Cattle were taken out of Kosciuszko National Park in NSW during the 1950s and 1960s due to concerns about the effect of grazing on water quality for the Snowy River Scheme. Grazing was also removed from Mounts Feathertop, Hotham and Bogong around this time, from around Mount Howitt in the 1980s, and from the northern Bogong High Plains, the Bluff and part of Davies Plains in the early 1990s, leaving about one third of the Alpine National Park – over 200,000 hectares (490,000 acres) – available for grazing. In 2005, the Victorian Government made the decision that cattle grazing would be banned in the remaining area of the Alpine National Park; although allowing grazing in adjacent state forest areas. When the Bracks Labor Victorian Government announced plans to end this grazing, the Howard coalition Federal Government floated the idea of using national cultural heritage powers to preserve grazing on the basis of the cultural place given to the mountain cattleman, notably through The Man from Snowy River.

For a period of over five years cattle were banned from the park, a decision which angered representative bodies of the graziers. As of January 2011 a group of cattlemen was permitted by Parks Victoria to return small numbers of cattle to fenced areas in the Alpine National Park. By 2013, fuel loads and weeds in the high plains had increased significantly and the Victorian Government sought Federal Government approval to remove the bans and commence a three-year trial to reinstate alpine grazing.

== Attractions ==
This area is popular in summer for bushwalking, cross-country skiing, mountain biking, four wheel driving and fishing. The major drawcards are the cooler alpine weather and the stunning scenery created by the highest peaks in Victoria. Walking tracks lead to most peaks and many extended walks are possible. The Australian Alps Walking Track, which begins in Walhalla and extends 650 kilometres (400 mi) north to Tharwa, just outside Canberra, traverses the park. Bush camping is permitted within the park subject to Parks Victoria guidelines and seasonal restrictions.

In winter much of the area is snow-covered and only accessible on skis. Falls Creek and Mount Hotham are major downhill ski resorts adjacent to the national park from where cross-country skiers journey into the park to areas such as the Bogong High Plains and Mount Bogong.

Hunting is a popular winter activity, with the park open to stalking (hunting without dogs) of sambar deer from mid-February to mid-December.

=== Major peaks ===
The following major peaks are located within the Alpine National Park, in order of descending elevation above sea level:

Peak name	Elevation		Prominence		Source(s)
Peak name	m	ft	m	ft	Source(s)
Mount Bogong	1,986	6,516	1,233	4,045	
Mount Feathertop	1,922	6,306	562	1,844	
Mount Nelse West	1,893	6,211	543	1,781	
Mount Loch	1,887	6,191	277	909	
Mount Nelse North	1,885	6,184	40	130	
Mount Nelse	1,882	6,175	40	130	
Mount Hotham	1,862	6,109	147	482	
Mount Fainter South	1,861	6,106	261	856	
The Jaithmathangs (Note: Named Mount Niggerhead before 12 December 2008)	1,826	5,991	172	564	
Mount McKay	1,841	6,040	181	594	
Mount Cope	1,837	6,027	152	499	

== See also ==
- Australian Alps
- Australian Alps National Parks and Reserves
- Protected areas of Victoria
- Wilsons Promontory
- Mount Baw Baw
