= Rocky Valley Dam =

Dam and power station in Victoria, Australia

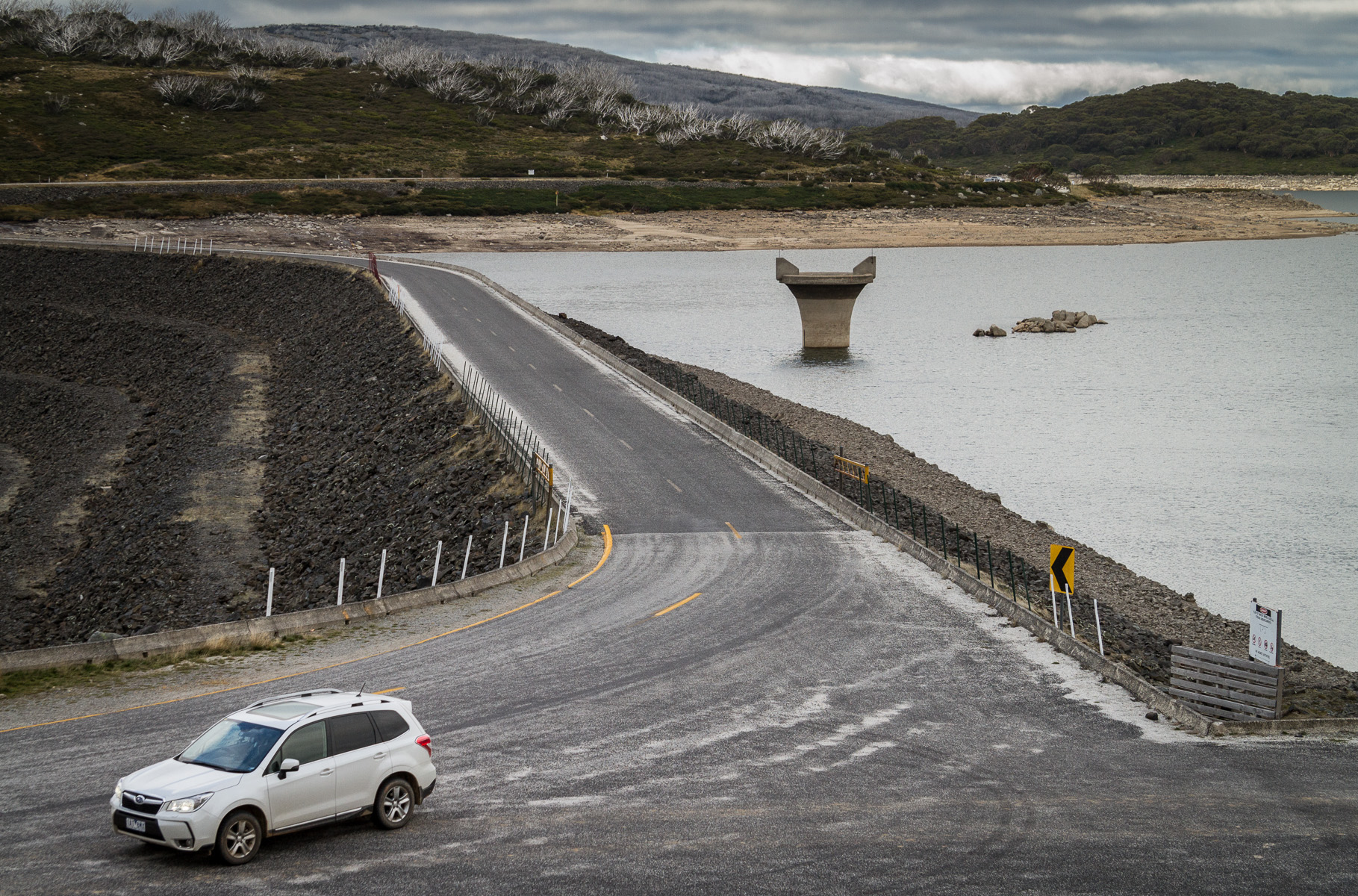
- The dam wall and reservoir, in April 2014. The reservoir water level is relatively low.

- Location of the dam in Victoria
- Interactive map of Rocky Valley Dam
- Country: Australia
- Location: Bogong High Plains, Victoria
- Coordinates: 36°52′27″S 147°17′38″E
- Purpose: Power
- Status: Operational
- Construction began: 1954
- Opening date: 1960
- Built by: State Electricity Commission of Victoria
- Operator: AGL Energy

Dam and spillways
- Type of dam: Rock-fill dam
- Impounds: East Kiewa River
- Height (foundation): 32 m (105 ft)
- Length: 518 m (1,699 ft)
- Dam volume: 459×10^{3} m^{3} (16.2×10^{6} cu ft)
- Spillway type: Uncontrolled
- Spillway capacity: 85 m^{3}/s (3,000 cu ft/s)

Reservoir
- Total capacity: 28.37 GL (23,000 acre⋅ft)
- Catchment area: 20 km^{2} (7.7 sq mi)
- Surface area: 265 ha (650 acres)
- Normal elevation: 1,594 m (5,230 ft) AHD

Mackay Creek Power Station
- Coordinates: 36°51′31″S 147°14′03″E
- Operator: AGL Energy
- Commission date: c. 1960
- Type: Conventional
- Turbines: 6 x 25 MW (34,000 hp) Pelton-type
- Installed capacity: 150 MW (200,000 hp)
- 2015 generation: 103 GWh (370 TJ)
- Website agl.com.au

The Rocky Valley Dam is a rock-filled embankment dam across the East Kiewa River, located on the Bogong High Plains, near Falls Creek, Victoria, Australia. Situated near the Falls Creek Alpine Resort, the dam is used for the generation of hydroelectricity for the Mackay Creek Power Station, one of the four conventional hydroelectric power stations that form part of the Kiewa Hydroelectric Scheme.

The dam and adjacent hydroelectric power station has been owned and operated by AGL Energy since 1991.

== Dam and reservoir overview ==
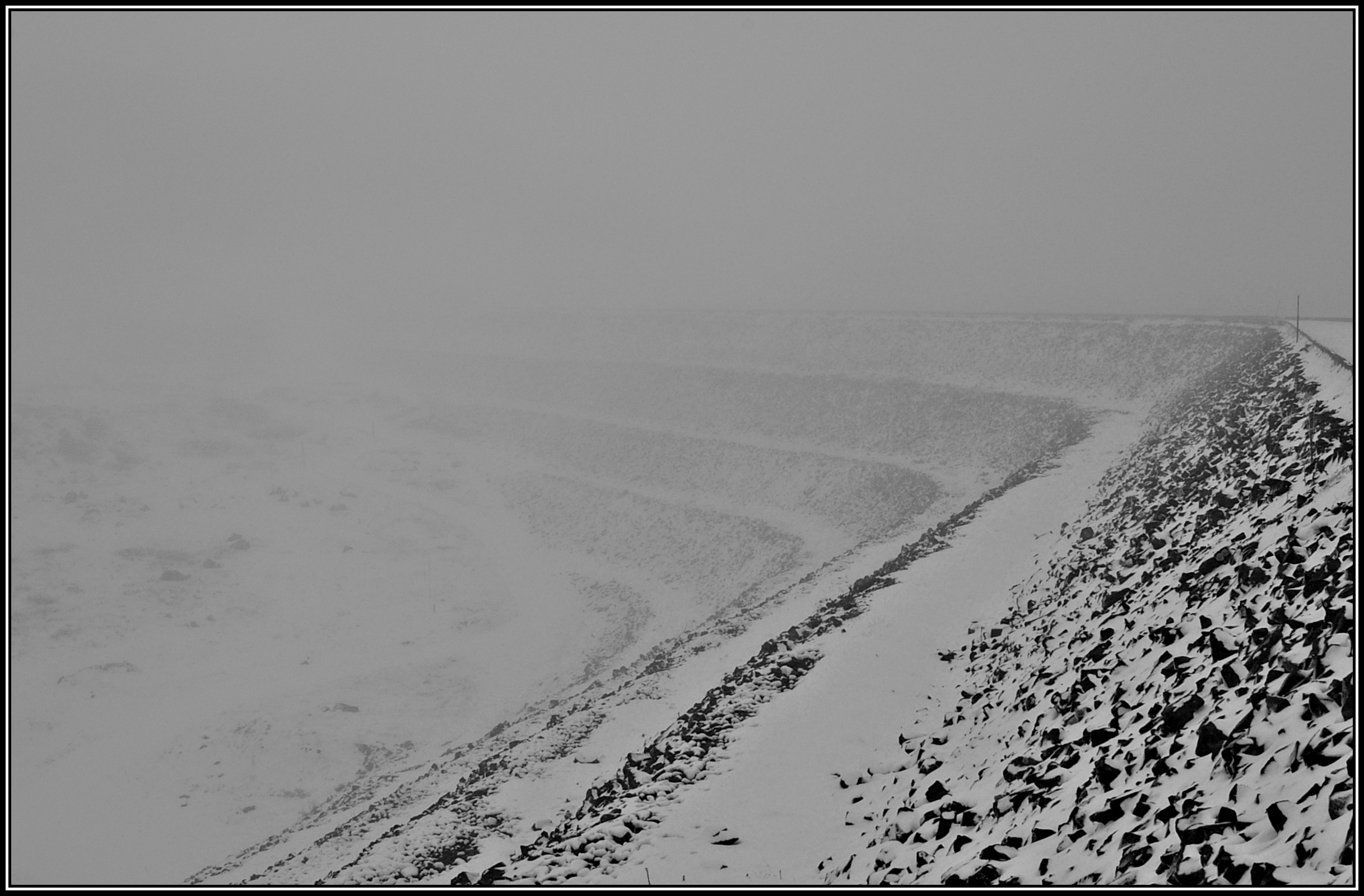
Snow on the embankment, May 2007

Funded and built by the State Electricity Commission of Victoria for the Kiewa Hydroelectric Scheme, construction of the dam begun in 1954 and was completed in 1960.

The rock-filled dam wall is 32 metres (105 ft) high and 518 metres (1,699 ft) long. When full, the resultant reservoir, with an elevation of 1,594 metres (5,230 ft) AHD, has a storage capacity of 28.37 gigalitres (23,000 acre⋅ft) and covers 26.5 hectares (65 acres), drawn from a catchment area of 20 square kilometres (7.7 sq mi). The controlled chute spillway has a discharge capacity of 85 cubic metres per second (3,000 cu ft/s).

The dam wall is traversable in all seasons. Water from the reservoir is used in snow making in winter for the Falls Creek Alpine Resort.

=== Hydroelectric Power Station ===
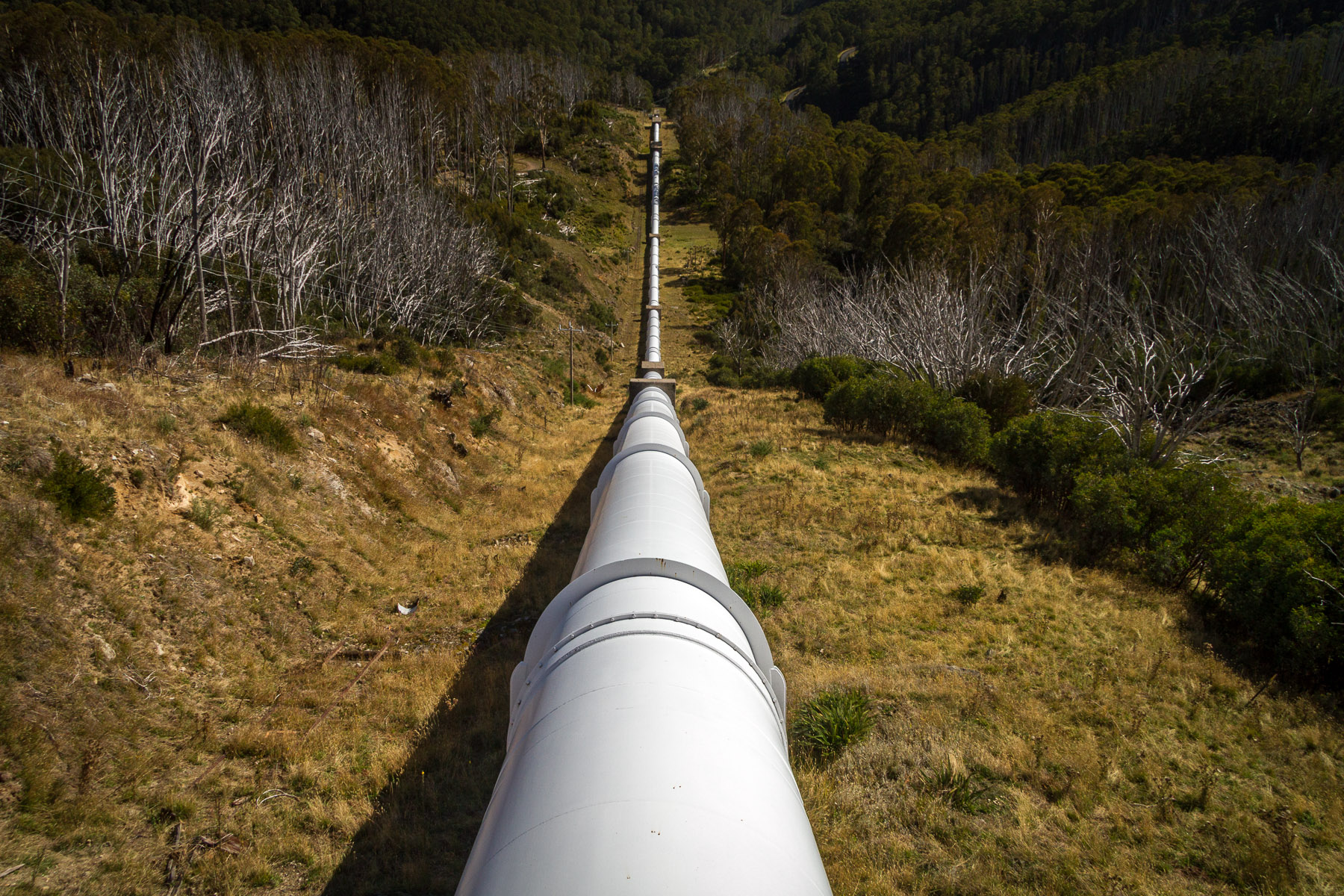
The above-ground pipeline

The McKay Creek Power Station is one of four conventional hydroelectric power stations that form part of the Kiewa Hydroelectric Scheme. The McKay Creek Power Station has six 25-megawatt (34,000 hp) generators driven by Pelton wheel turbines, with a total generating capacity of 150 megawatts (200,000 hp). The Mackay Creek Power Station is located 80 metres (260 ft) underground on the slopes of Mount McKay. The reservoir at Rocky Valley Dam and a diversion from the reservoir at Pretty Valley Dam, together supply water for the McKay Creek Power Station, via 5.5 kilometres (3.4 mi) of sub-terrainan tunnels, 1,250 metres (4,100 ft) of surface pipeline, and a steel-lined pressure tunnel.

Water discharged from the McKay Creek Power Station flows down the Pretty Valley branch of East Kiewa River to Bogong, and, since 2009, has been used by the Bogong Hydropower Project. The station has capacity for 150 megawatts (200,000 hp) and, in 2015, generated 103 gigawatt-hours (370 TJ) per annum.

== See also ==
- List of power stations in Victoria
  - Kiewa Hydroelectric Scheme
- List of conventional hydroelectric power stations
- List of reservoirs and dams in Victoria
