= Bogong High Plains =

Mountains in Australia

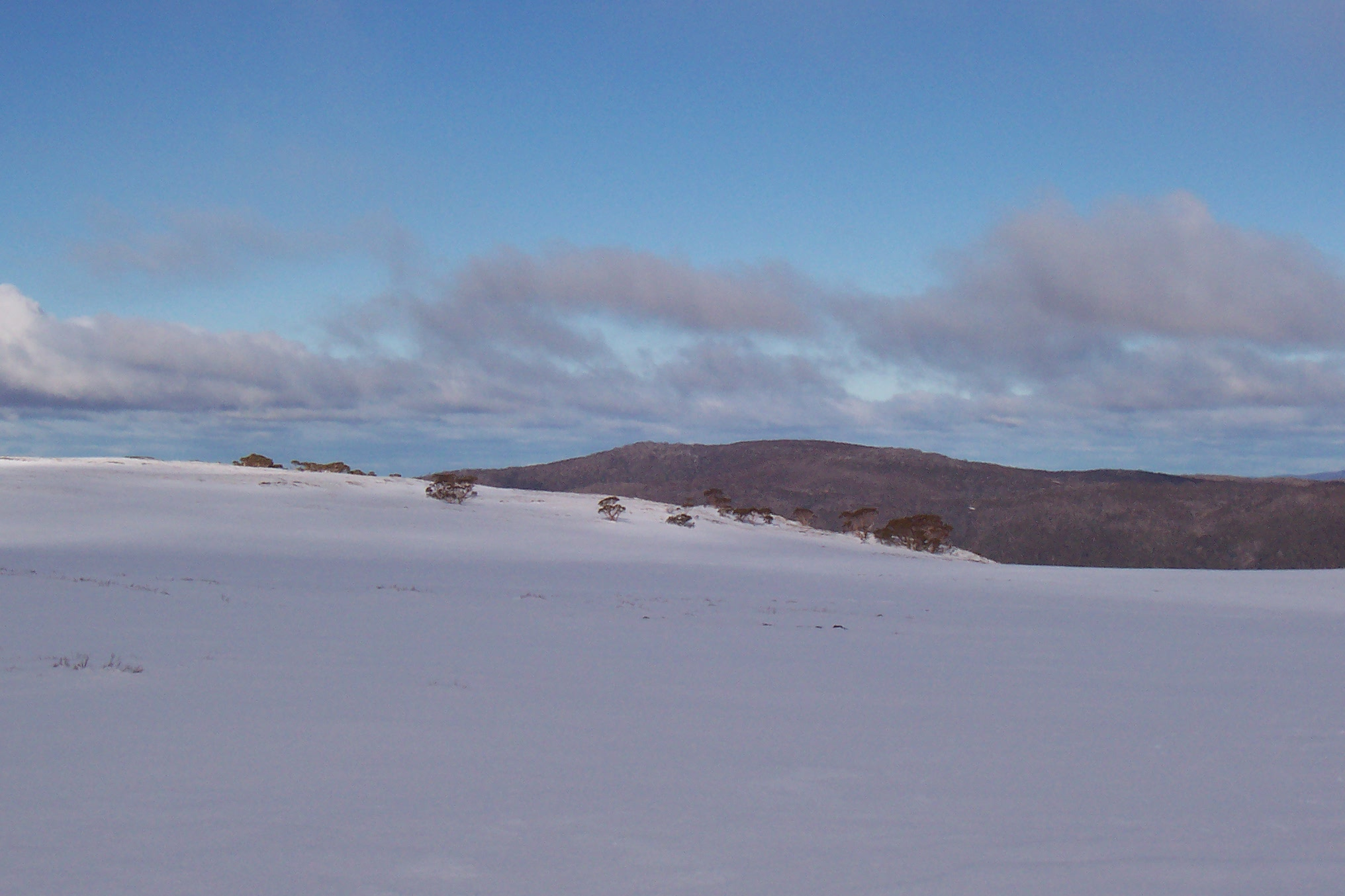
- Typical winter scene

Highest point
- Peak: Mount Nelse West, Alpine National Park
- Elevation: 1,893 m (6,211 ft); AHD
- Coordinates: 36°50′39″S 147°20′24″E

Geography
- Location within Victoria
- Country: Australia
- Region: Victoria
- Parent range: Victorian Alps, Great Dividing Range

Geology
- Rock age: Devonian
- Rock types: Igneous; Sedimentary; Metamorphic

The Bogong High Plains (/ˈboʊɡɒŋ/), part of the Victorian Alps of the Great Dividing Range, are a section of plains located in the Alpine National Park in the Australian state of Victoria and are situated south of Mount Bogong.

In winter this area is one of the largest snow-covered areas in Australia and can be easily accessed from the Hotham Alpine Resort and Falls Creek ski resort. The area is very popular for both summer and winter time activities. Ski touring and all types of cross-country skiing are possible through most winter months. A trail called Australian Alps Walking Track is popular for hiking in summer and cross-country skiing in winter. Mountain biking and bushwalking are common in summer. Local towns and villages provide the best possibility for exploring the areas, including Mount Beauty and Harrietville.

== History ==
The traditional custodians of the land surrounding the Bogong High Plains are the indigenous Australian Bidawal, Dhudhuroa, Gunai–Kurnai and Nindi–Ngudjam Ngarigu Monero peoples.

Europeans first explored and settled in the area as graziers sought pastoral land mainly for cattle. The biggest early development for the area was the Kiewa Hydroelectric Scheme which began construction in the 1940s. Two dams were constructed, Pretty Valley Pondage and Rocky Valley Dam, and a series of aqueducts built to capture streams and bring their flows across into the catchments of the Kiewa Scheme. McKay Creek and West Kiewa Power Stations supply most of the electricity generated. Since completion of the Scheme, the area has become much more based around tourism, particularly skiing.

=== Scientific research ===
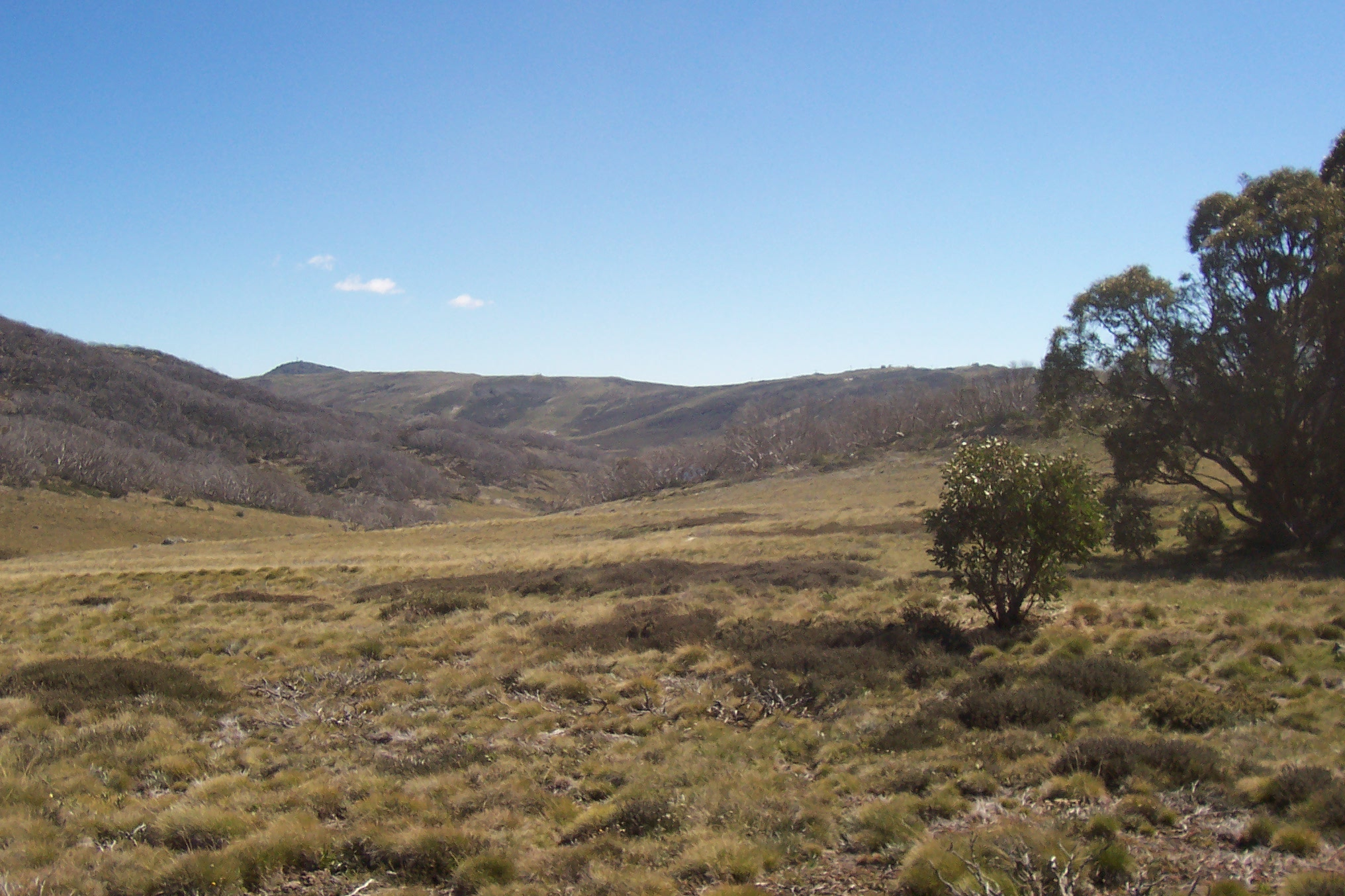
A view of Bogong High Plains in summer

Systematic scientific research began in 1947, when Miss Maisie Fawcett [later Mrs S.G.M. Carr] set up two grazing exclosures to directly investigate the impacts of animal grazing on Australian alpine and sub-alpine vegetation. These original plots have been monitored ever since, and represent the longest continuous series of ecological data of any site in Australia. All grazing was finally excluded from the area by the Victorian government in 2005, in part because of the compelling evidence provided by this particular experiment.

The Bogong High Plains continues to have an important place in scientific research. In summer, large numbers of scientists conduct research in the area, including studies of hydrology, vegetation change, fire response, weed invasions, occurrence of native animals (mountain pygmy possum, alpine skink) and introduced species (such as hares, horses and sambar deer). The area is also home to a component of the International Tundra Experiment (ITEX), which investigates aspects of global climate change. It is trying to predict the future impacts of temperature increases.

=== Bushfires ===
This area is prone to bushfires because of the large amount of native forest. The 2003 Eastern Victorian alpine bushfires devastated much of the areas of forest. Many well-known huts were destroyed. More recently the area was again threatened during the 2006-07 Australian bushfire season but due to favourable weather, damage appears to be minimal in comparison.

== Huts ==
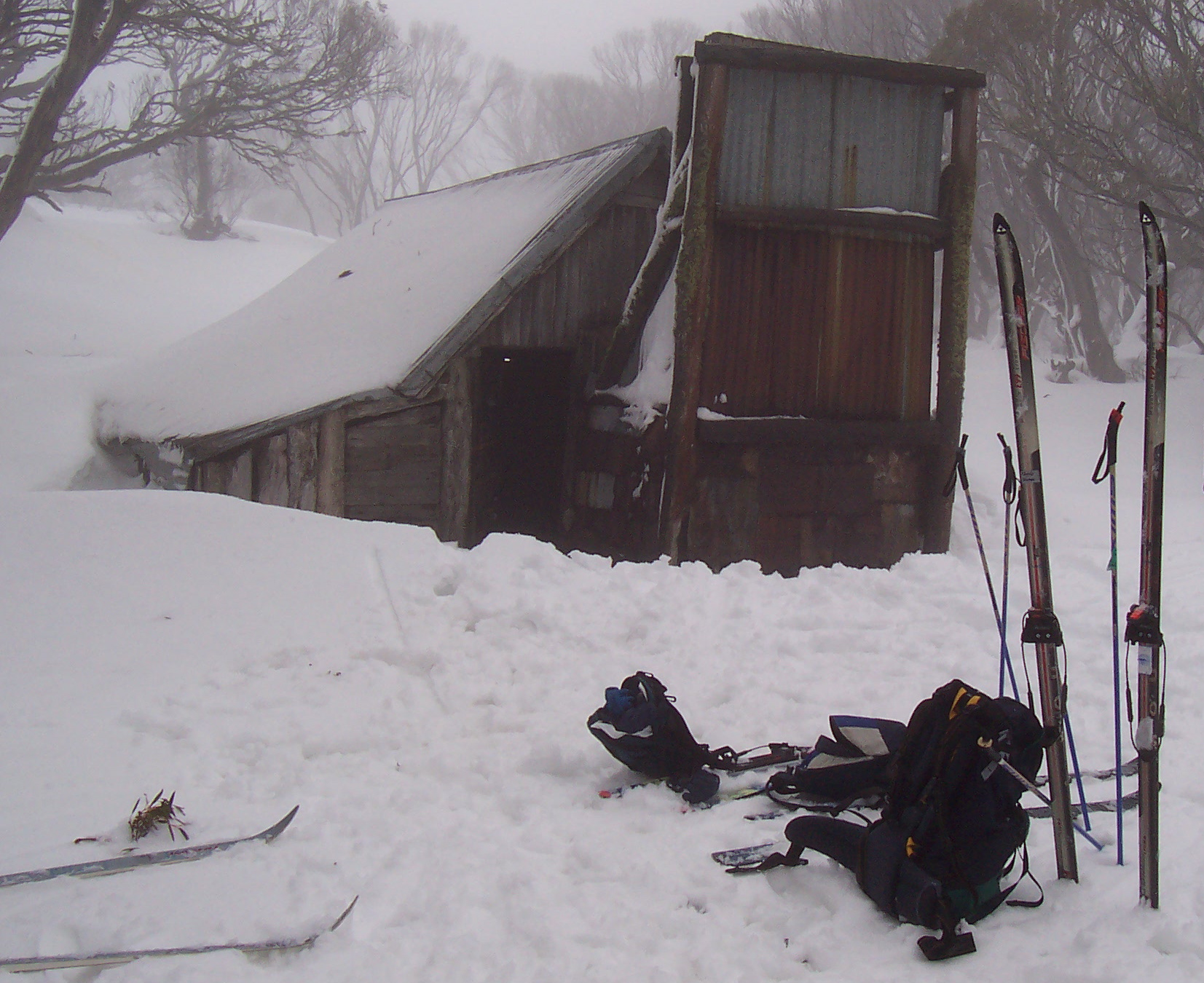
Wallace's Hut in winter

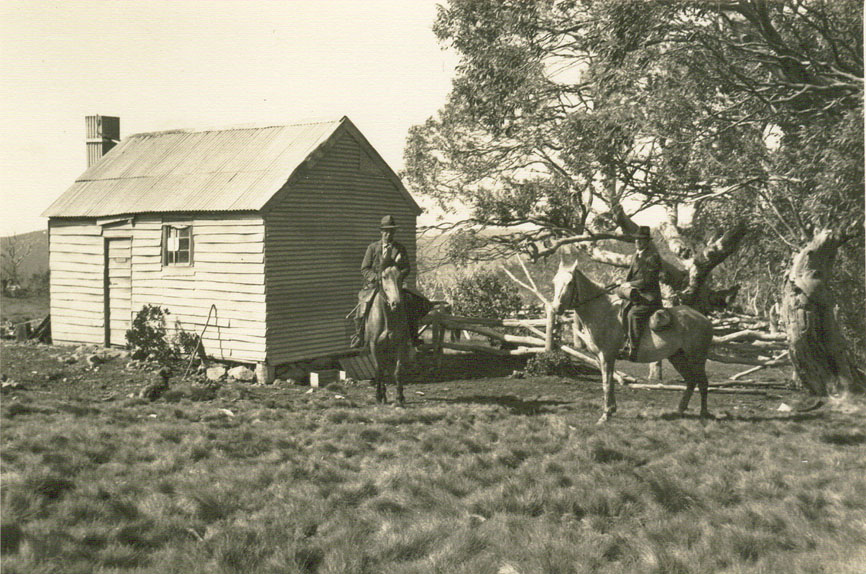
Fitzgeralds hut in 1940

Alpine huts in the area provide accommodation for people out in the winter ski touring and those interested in hiking or other activities in the summertime. There are tens of huts in this area, each different and equipped for different purposes. They were first built by European pastoralists moving in from New South Wales in the 1830s. They are no longer used by pastoralists. Many are run by ski clubs but some are not regularly used or maintained at all.

Wallace's Hut

This is the oldest on the high plains. Originally built in 1889 like most of the huts has been extended since. It has no modern facilities and so is not used for accommodation. It measures 4.5 metres (15 ft) by 3.7 metres (12 ft). The hut was used by the State Electricity Commission of Victoria for a period, during which repairs were made to the old hut. When the hut was surplus to SEC requirements, the chimney and tin roof the SEC had installed were purchased by Rover Scouts Victoria so they would not be removed. After this investment, the Rovers continued to maintain the property for many decades.

Bogong Rover Chalet

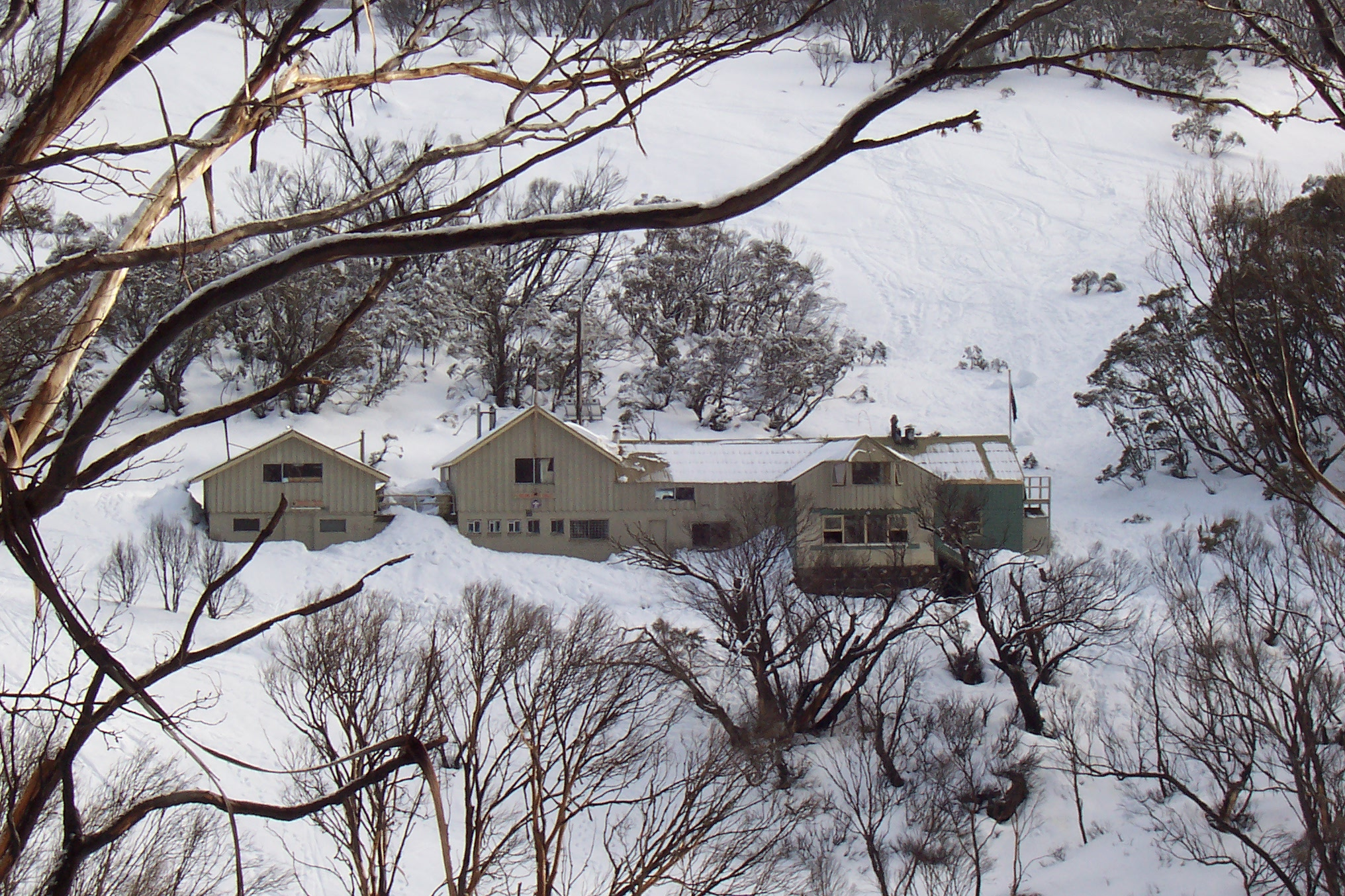
Bogong Rover Chalet.

This was the first lodge developed in the area, before the creation of the ski resorts in Australia. It was constructed in 1940 by Rover Scouts Victoria. The Bogong Rover Chalet is the largest alpine lodge in Australia outside of the alpine resorts, with full comforts and amenities for 35 people. It has been expanded and refurbished several times since it was built. It uses solar power, gas, wood heating and runs its own electricity generators using diesel. It has a full kitchen, showers and runs approximately 13 winter weeks for Rovers and Venturer Scouts.

Cope Hut

This hut was built by the Ski Club of Victoria in 1929. It contains bunk beds and a table, as well as a fireplace.

Fitzgerald Hut

This was one of the older huts. It was accidentally burnt down by a school group in 1991 and rebuilt in 1993.

Roper Hut

This was burnt down in the bushfire of 2003 and rebuilt in 2008.

Wilkinson Lodge

Affectionately known as Wilky, this hut was built by the State Electricity Commission as a hydrological survey hut prior to the construction of the Kiewa Hydroelectric Scheme. The hut was later sold to a ski club but this sale never included title to the land on which it sat. The hut was purchased in 1962 by members of the Melbourne Bushwalkers who then donated it to the club. The hut was renovated and maintained by the Melbourne Bushwalkers and used throughout the winter as a base for cross-country skiing. It was well-used throughout the year for research and outdoor activities by members and by many other groups. It survived the 2003 bushfires but burnt down one year later (January 2004) in a cooking accident, while being used by non-members. The woodshed still remains. The National Parks and Wildlife Service which administers the land has refused permission to rebuild.

Batty's Hut

This hut burnt down in the bushfires of 2006.

Cleve Cole Hut

This hut on Mount Bogong was built in 1938 as a memorial to Cleve Cole who died on a ski trip on Mount Bogong. Technically, Mount Bogong is not part of the Bogong High Plains.

Also on Mount Bogong are Michell Hut, on Eskdale Spur, which was rebuilt after the 2003 fires and Bivouac Hut on the Staircase Spur. Other huts in the area include Tawonga Huts, Young's Hut, Ryder's Huts, Cope Saddle Hut, Pretty Valley Hut, Edmondson Hut, Johnston's Hut, Buckety Plains Hut, Faithful's Hut, and Langford Gap Hut.

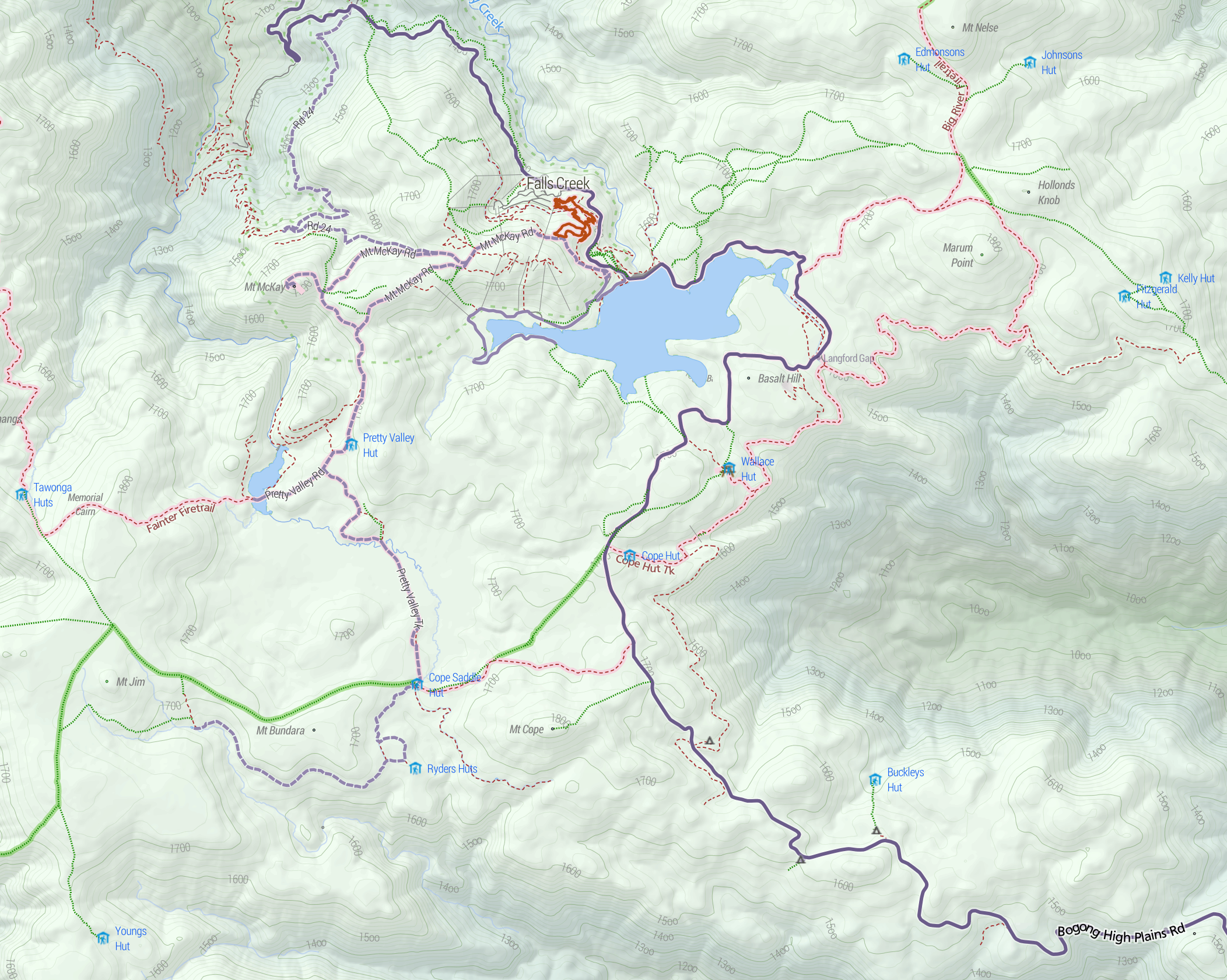
Topographic Map of the Bogong High Plains area, showing huts, hiking (green) and mountain biking (pink) paths

== Ecology ==
=== Vegetation ===
The Bogong High Plains contain a mixture of various types of vegetation. About 50% of the High Plains are heathlands, which cover some of the steeper and more wind protected areas in the high plains. The soils are typically shallow and rocky. Approximately 25% of the High Plains are grasslands, which occur in more exposed areas, on gentle slopes are typically more resistant to wind and frosts. Some of the best soils occur in wetlands, which cover about 10% of the high plains. These areas are defined as places where there is stationary water for at least one month per year. The presence of water typically leads to highly organic soils, from the decay of vegetable matter, and very little mineral matter. Snow patch herb fields occur in places where snow remains for a large portion of the summer and are very rare.

== Range peaks ==
Mountain	Elevation
Mount Nelse West	1,893 m (6,211 ft)
Mount Nelse North	1,885 m (6,184 ft)
Mount Fainter South	1,883 m (6,178 ft)
Mount Hotham	1,862 m (6,109 ft)
Mount McKay	1,842 m (6,043 ft)
Mount Cope	1,837 m (6,027 ft)
Spion Kopje	1,837 m (6,027 ft)
Mount Jim	1,818 m (5,965 ft)

Mount Bogong, the highest mountain in Victoria, is just north of the High Plains. Technically it is not part of the high plains because it is separated from them by the Big River. There are several huts on the mountain, the earliest of which was built following the death of a skier in 1936. Mount Feathertop is a much more foreboding summit in the west of the Bogong High Plains. It is a popular bushwalking destination due to its proximity to Mount Hotham but can also be approached from Harrietville.

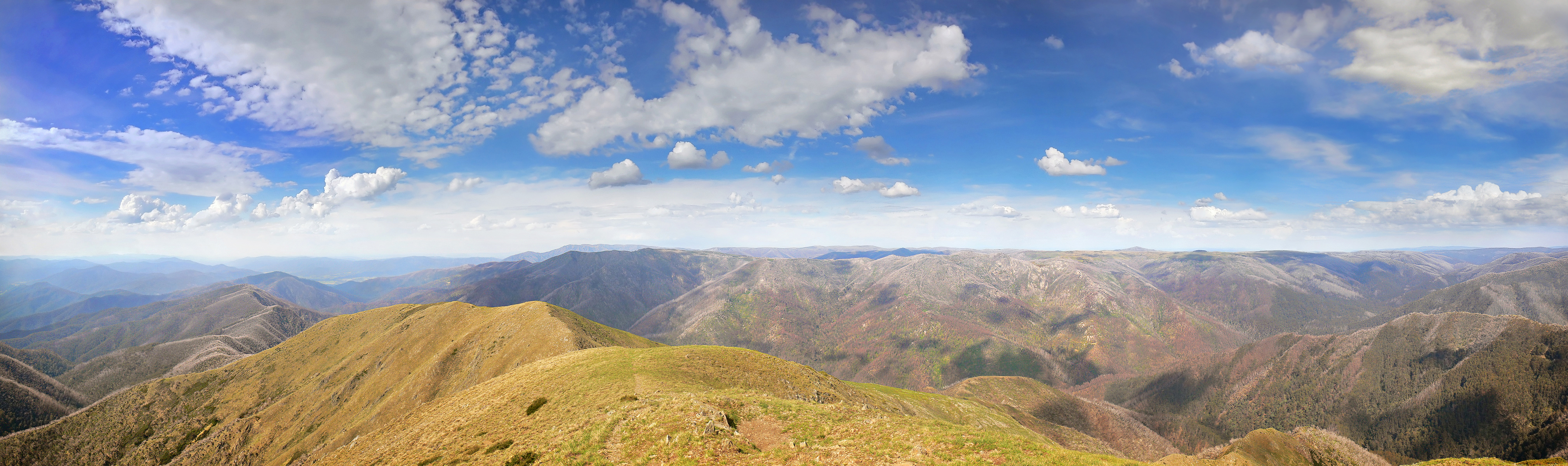
View of the Bogong plains from the west, taken from Mount Feathertop in spring

== Bogong High Plains Road ==
The Bogong High Plains Road runs from Mt Beauty, up to the ski resort of Falls Creek, up to an elevation of around 1,720 m (5,640 ft), before steeply descending through Trapyard Gap at gradients frequently exceeding 9%. The road was fully sealed in 2009, immediately gaining the interest of road cyclists as it allows a complete circuit through Nelse, Omeo, Mt Hotham, Harrietville and back to Mt Beauty. It is now used in the Peaks Challenge Falls Creek and Audax Alpine Classic ACE annual cycling events.

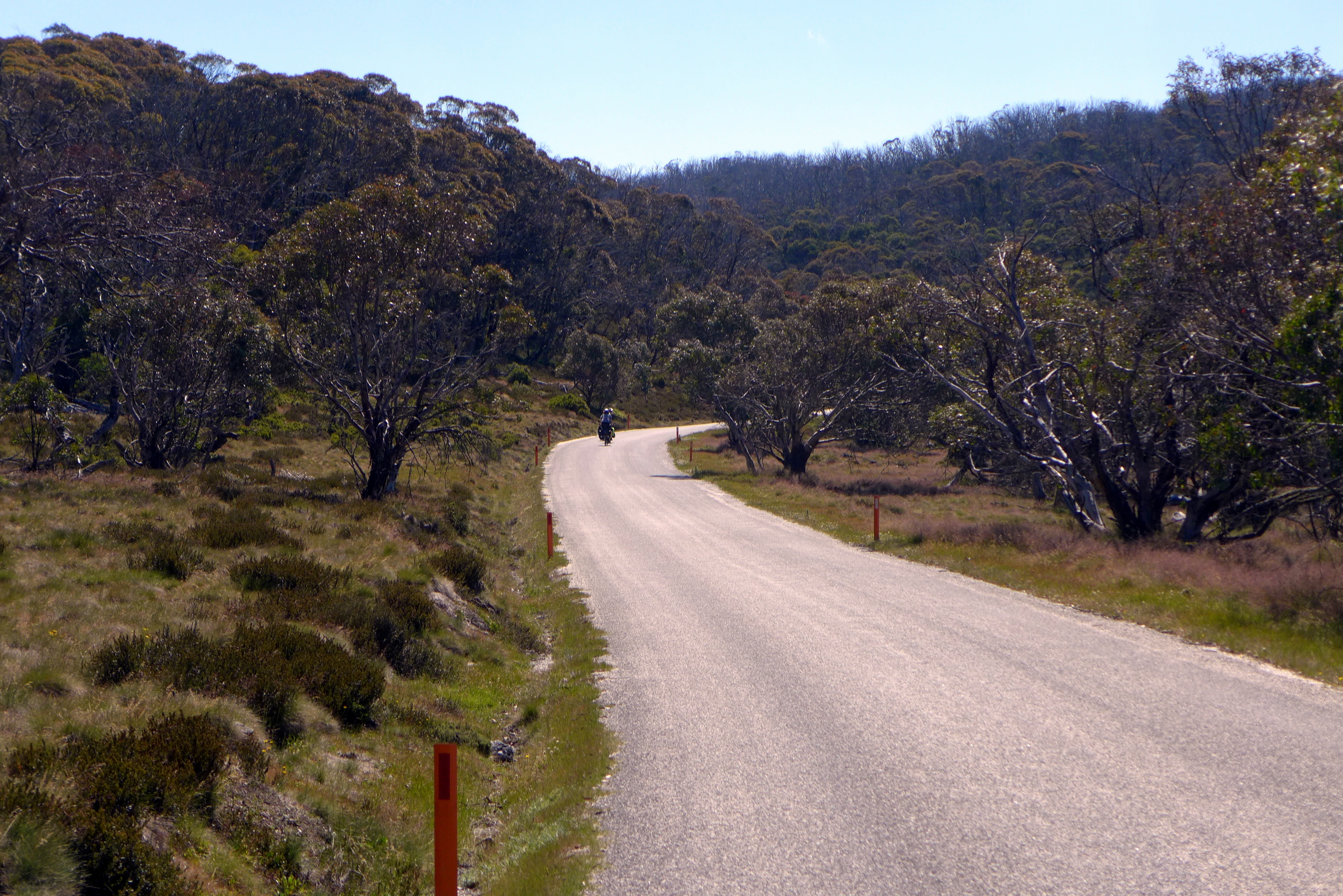

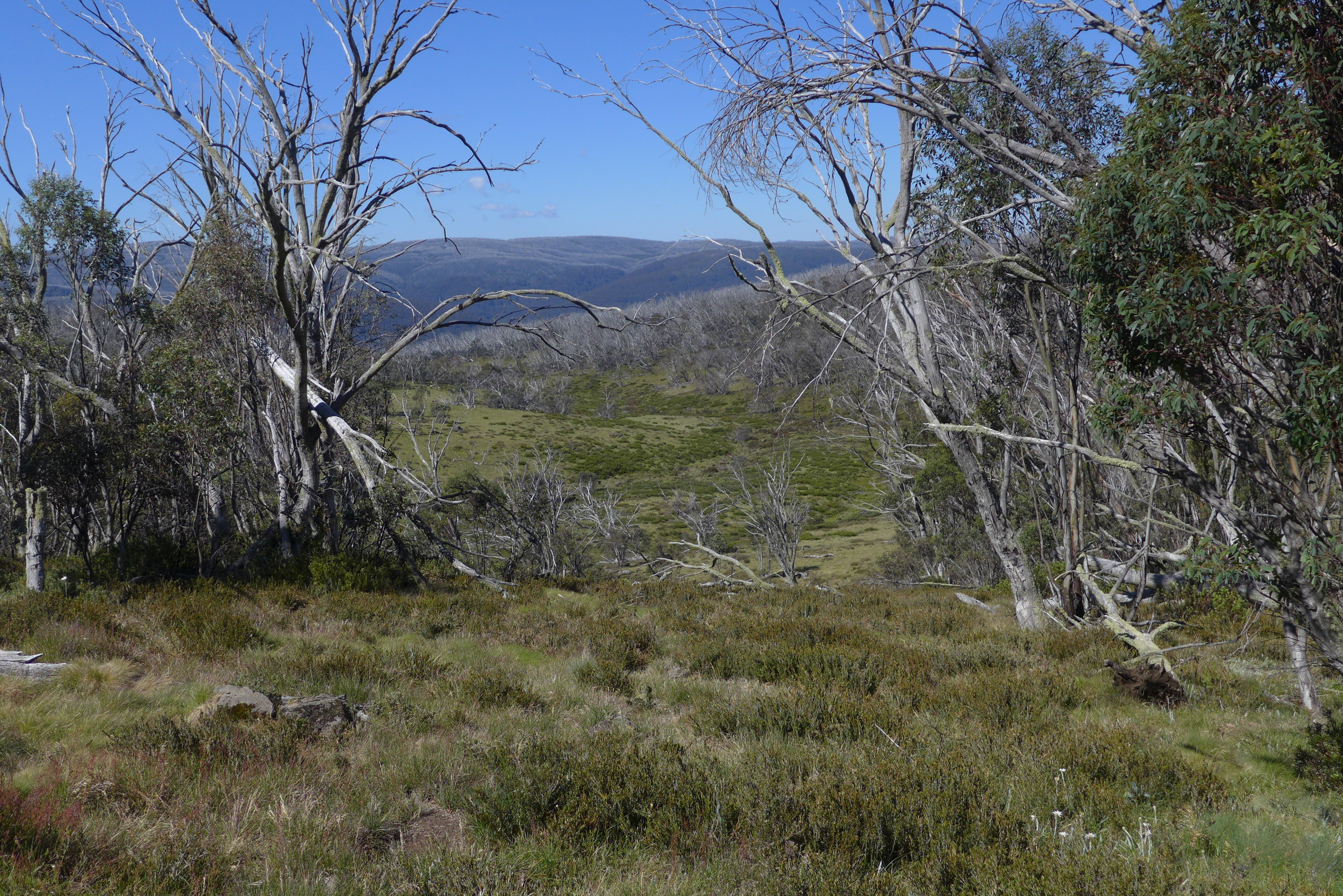

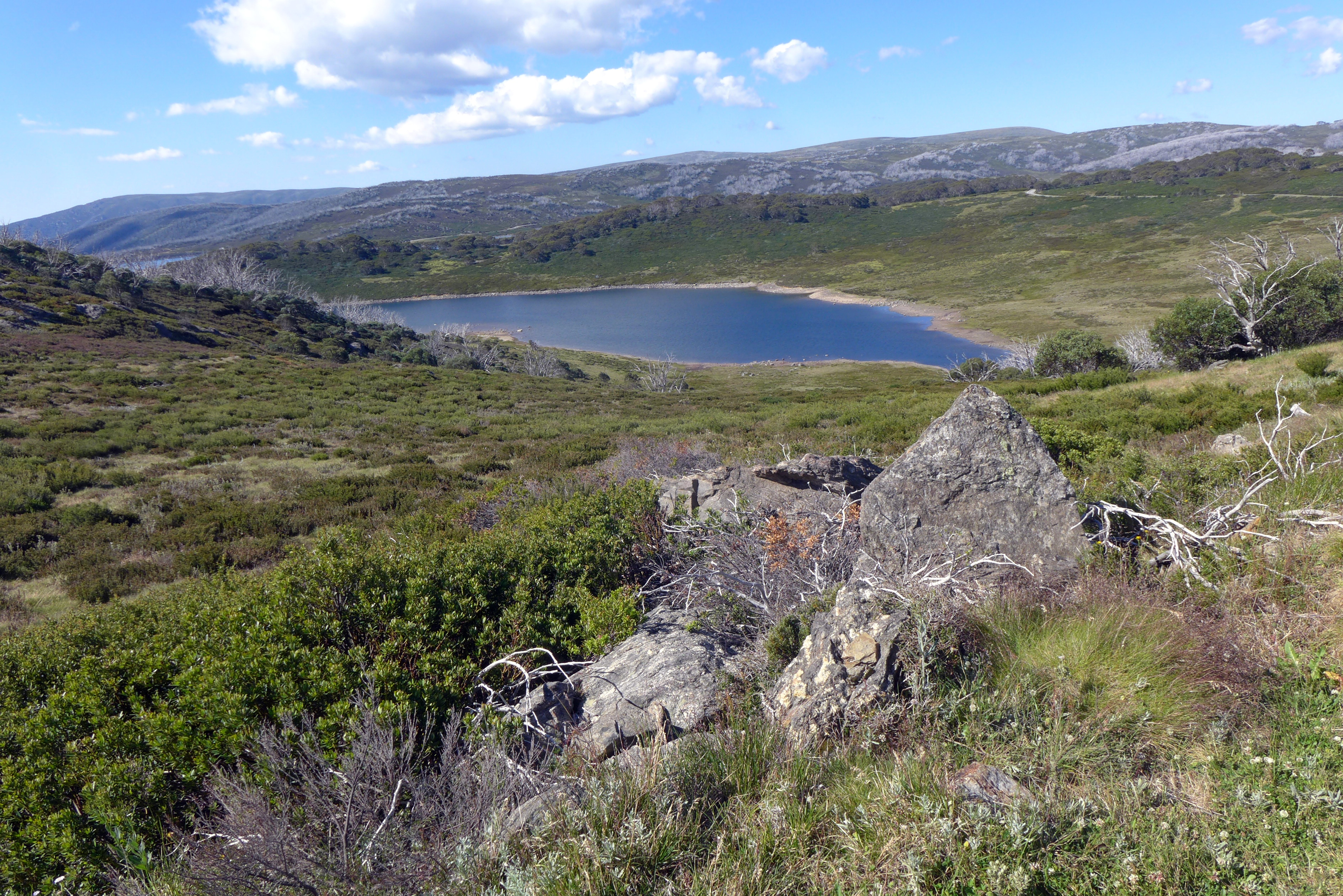
Rocky Valley Storage dam just southeast of Falls Creek.

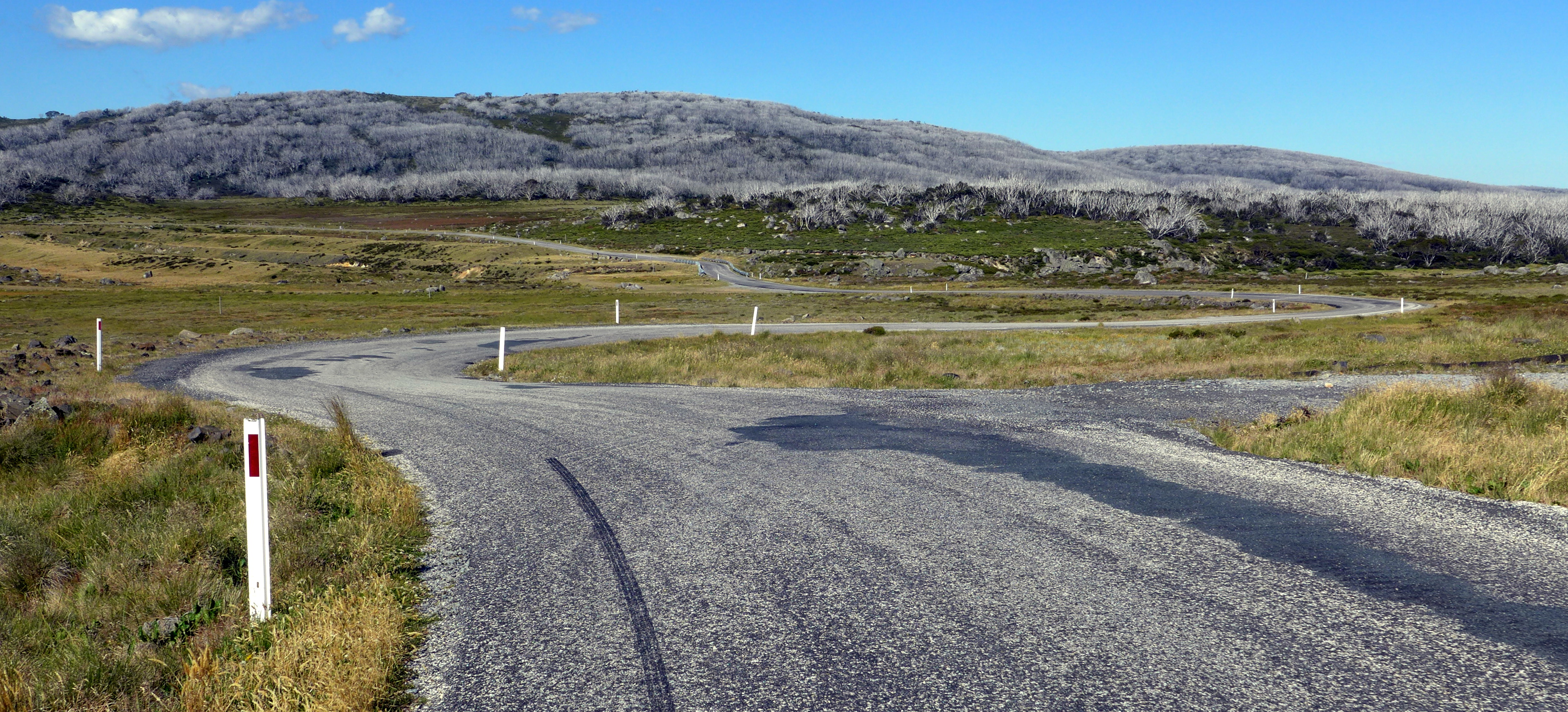

== See also ==
- List of mountains in Australia § Victoria
