= Falls Creek Alpine Resort =

Ski resort in Victoria, Australia

Falls Creek
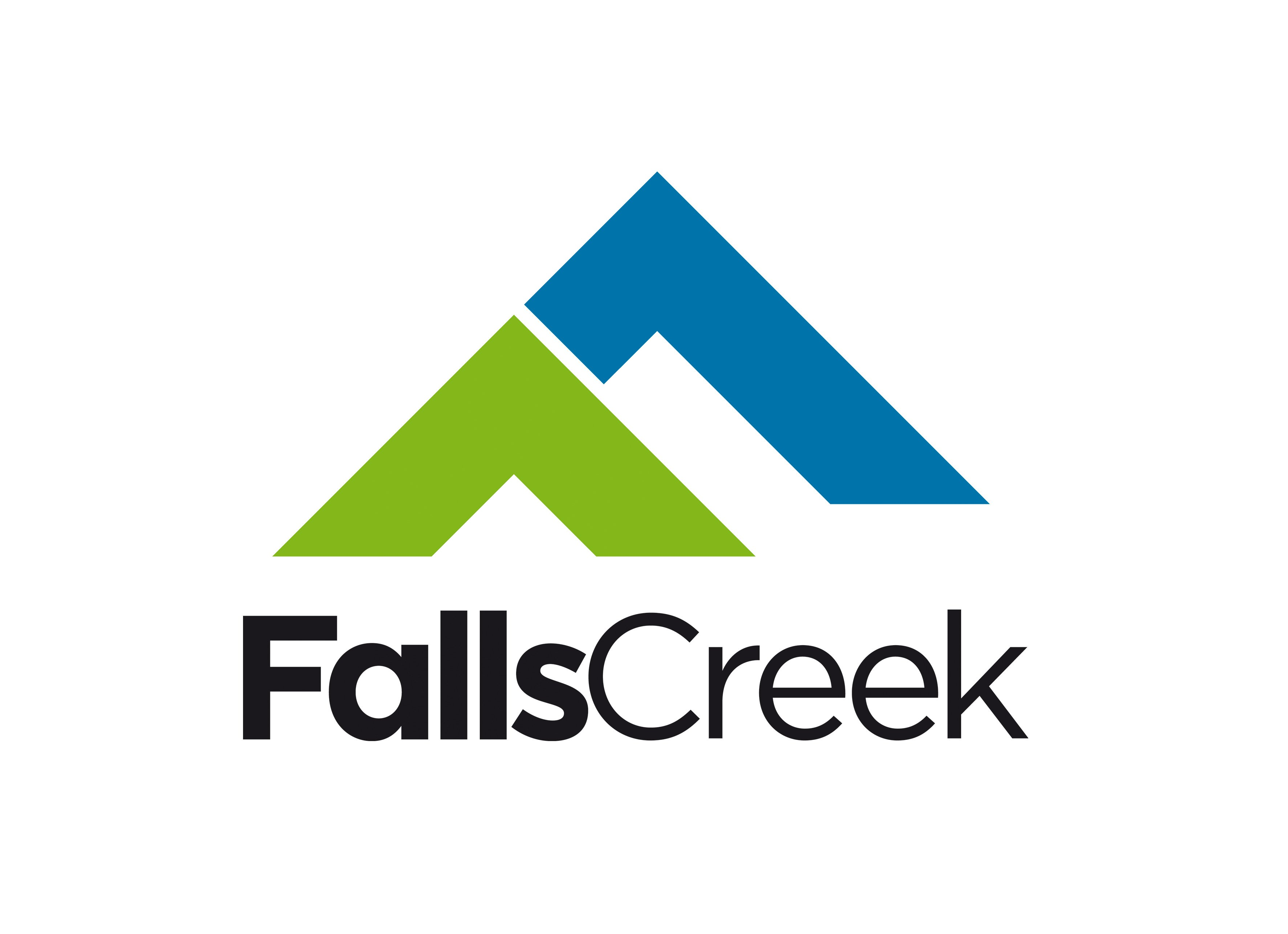

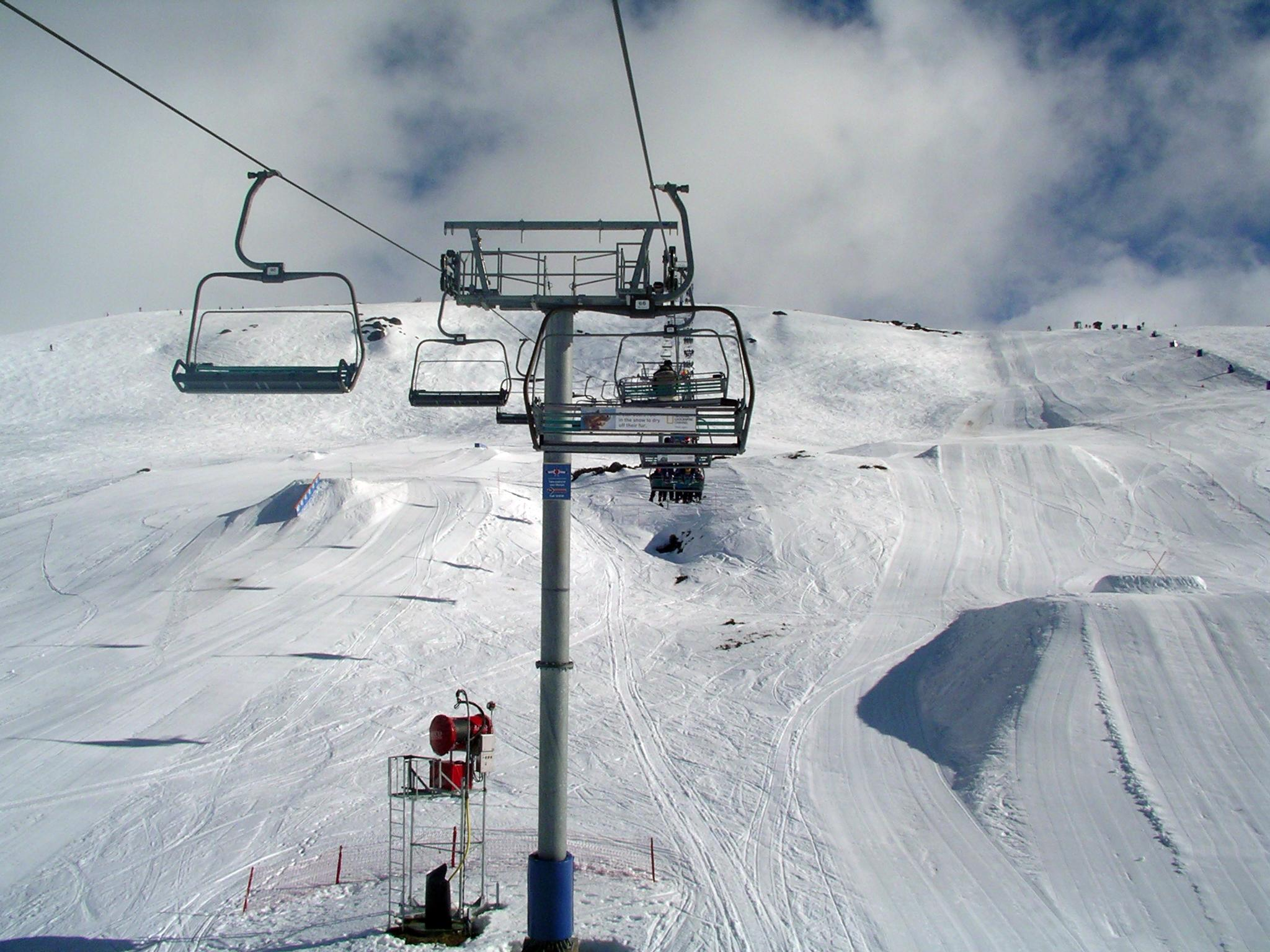
- The Ruined Castle chairlift and terrain park

- Location near Alpine Shire
- Location: Alpine National Park; Australian Alps; Victoria, Australia
- Nearest city: Mount Beauty – 30 km (20 mi); Wodonga
- Coordinates: 36.865°S 147.273°E
- Owner: Alpine Resorts Victoria (ARV)
- Vertical: 280 m (919 ft)
- Top elevation: 1,780 m (5,840 ft)
- Base elevation: 1,500 m (4,921 ft)
- Skiable area: 450 ha (1,100 acres)
- Trails: 76+ – 17% beginner – 60% intermediate – 23% advanced
- Longest run: 3 km (1.9 mi), Wishing Well
- Lift system: 16 lifts
- Terrain parks: 4
- Snowfall: 4 m (160 in) per year
- Snowmaking: ~30% of slopes have snowmaking capabilities
- Night skiing: Wed & Sat 6–9 pm
- Website: fallscreek.com.au

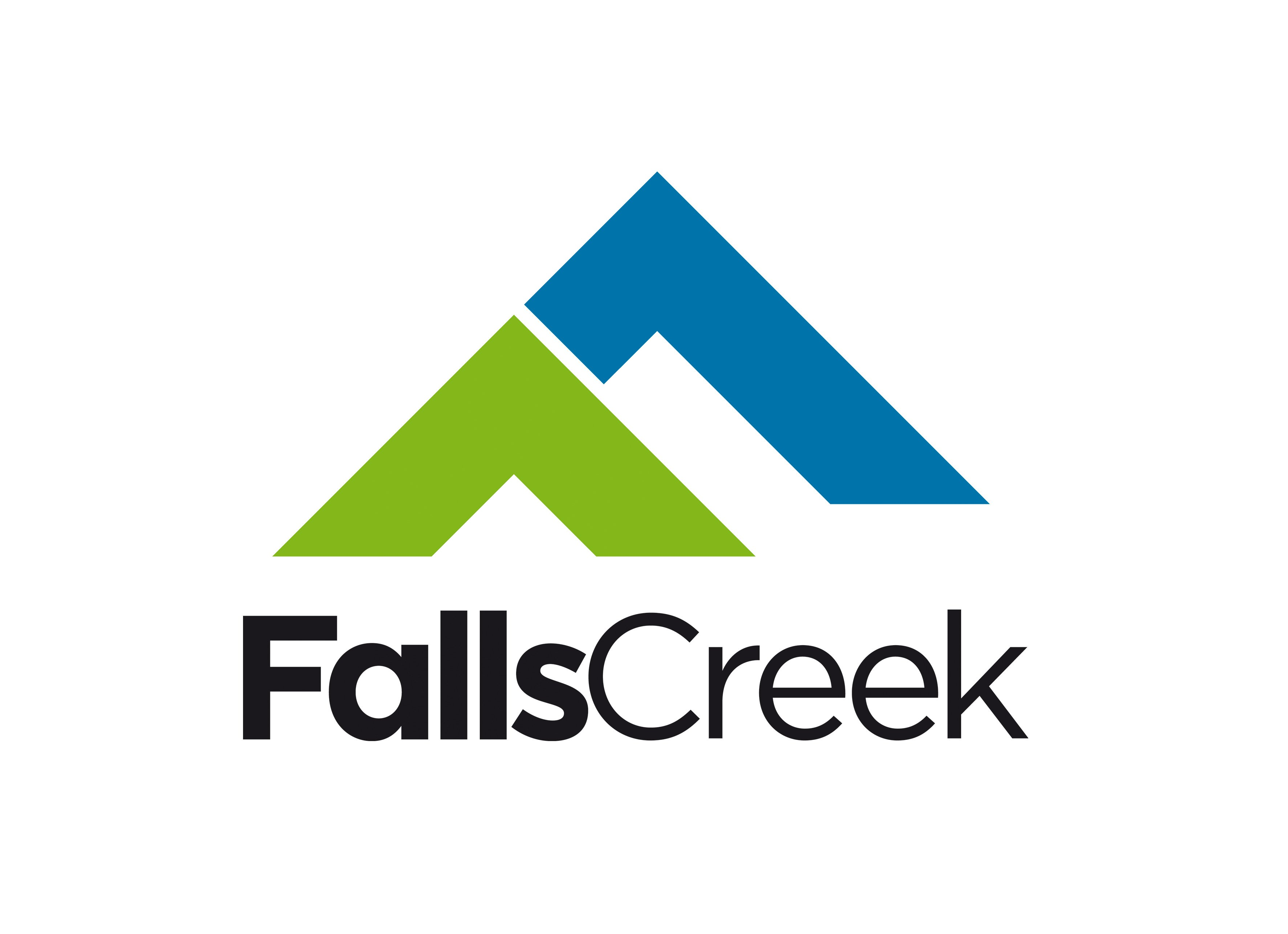
New logo for Falls Creek

The Falls Creek Alpine Resort is an alpine ski resort in the Hume region in northeastern Victoria, Australia. It is located in the Alpine National Park in the Victorian Alps, approximately 350 kilometres (220 miles) by road from Melbourne, with the nearest town being Mount Beauty, which is approximately 30 km (20 mi) away. The resort lies between an elevation of 1,500 and 1,830 m (4,921 and 6,004 ft) above sea level, with the highest lifted point at 1,780 m (5,840 ft). Skiing is possible on the nearby peak of Mount McKay at 1,842 m (6,043 ft), accessed by snowcat from the resort.

The resort is an unincorporated area, directly administered by the government of Victoria, and surrounded by the Alpine Shire.

== Alpine resort ==
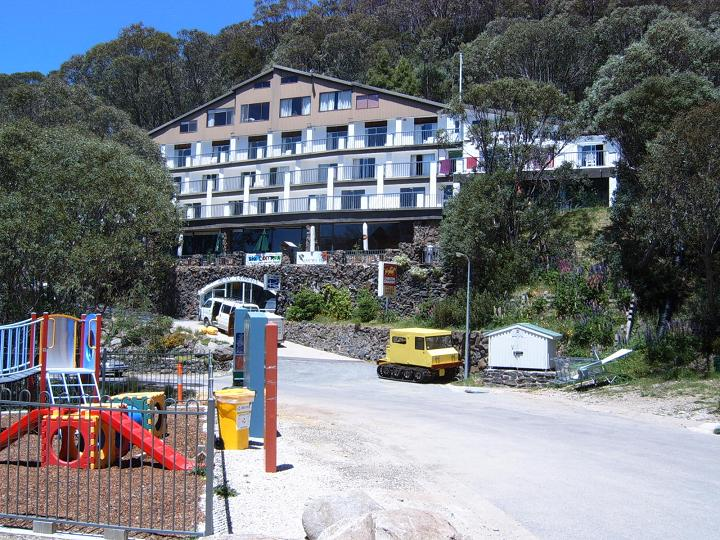
Falls Creek Hotel in summer (January)

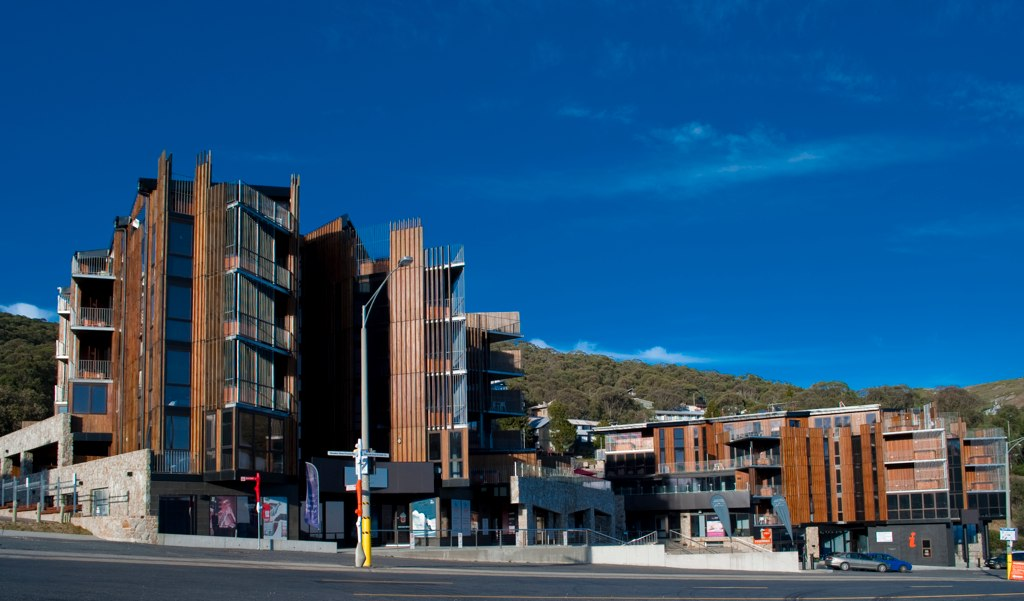
St Falls ski lodge

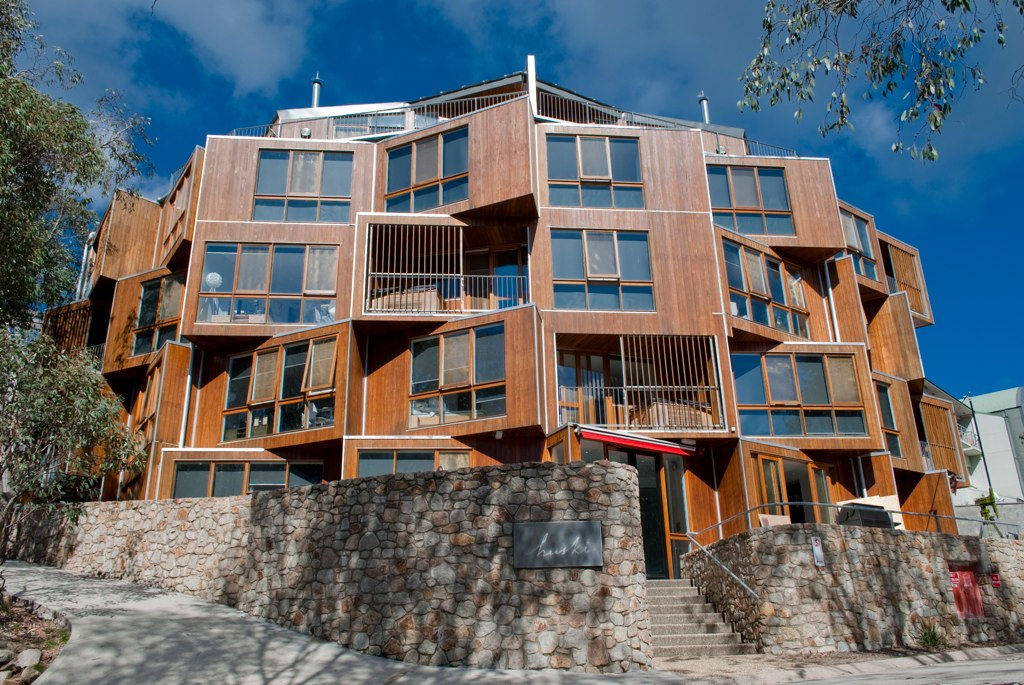
Huski Hotel

Falls Creek is beginner/intermediate friendly, with almost 80% of the resort dedicated to these types of skiers/snowboarders. However, Australia's notoriously fickle snow conditions ensure that snowmaking using the water from the nearby Rocky Valley Lake is sometimes, particularly early in the season, the main source of skiable snow. Consequently, like all Australian snowfields, Falls Creek's customer base is almost entirely domestic, however many international cross country skiers travel to Falls Creek for the Kangaroo Hoppet, Australia's Worldloppet event on the last Saturday of August and international snowboarders to Stylewars, The Australian Slopestyle Championships and Australia's highest sanctioned TTR World Tour event held in the first week of September.

The resort features 4500 accommodation beds, and consequently a large number of restaurants, bars and nightclubs to entertain guests at night. Some apartments are privately owned, but the resort's management requires that they must be available for hire when not occupied.

The resort also serves as a summer base to explore the national park surrounding the resort. The Falls to Hotham alpine crossing is a 37km three day hike that starts at Falls Creek and finishes at Mount Hotham. A planned expansion of the walk to make it 52km over 4 days with new huts being built has raised community concerns.

Falls Creek is accessible by the Bogong High Plains Road from Mount Beauty all year round, though like all of Australia's snow resorts snow chains must be carried during winter and fitted if directed. The road continues across the High Plains and descends to meet the Omeo Highway north of the hamlet of Anglers Rest, however the route from this side is closed during the snow season.

In summer both routes are popular with cyclists, and various cycling events are held that involve climbing to the resort, including the popular SCODY 3 Peaks Challenge (recently renamed to Falls Creek Peaks Challenge).

=== Quick Statistics ===
- Highest elevation: 1,842 m (6,043 ft)
- Highest lifted elevation: 1,780 m (5,840 ft)
- Village elevation: 1,600 m (5,250 ft)
- Number of lifts: 16

==== In winter ====
- Snowline elevation: 1,100 m (3,610 ft)
- Average yearly snowfall: 4 m (160 in)
- Average days open in winter: 128

==== Alpine ====
- Number of Runs: 76+
- Longest advanced run: Wishing Well, 3 km (1.9 mi)
- Longest beginner run: Wombats Ramble, 2.2 km (1.4 mi)
- Terrain mix: 17% beginner, 60% intermediate, 23% advanced
- Total lift length: 8.1km
- Lift capacity: 28,392 Passengers/hour

Cross country

- Number of trails: 21
- Groomed trail network: 65 km (40 mi)
- Longest trail: Rocky Valley Dam Loop, 21 km (13 mi)
- Terrain mix: Beginner 33%, Intermediate 48%, Advanced 19%

== Lift network ==
Lift Name	Lift Type	Manufacturer	Moving Capacity / Hour	Year built	Speed	Ride Time	Lift Length	Elevation Climb
Eagle Express	4 person chair, detachable	Leitner-Poma	2400 people	2018	5.1m/s	2:50 mins	800m	191m
Halley's Comet	4 person chair, detachable	Doppelmayr	2400 people	1986	5.0m/s	3:20 mins	900m	200m
Summit	4 person chair, fixed	Doppelmayr	2400 people	1992	2.0m/s	4:40 mins	587m	187m
International	1 person poma, detachable	Poma	1000 people	1969	2.0m/s	11:00 mins	1216m	278m
Gully	3 person chair, fixed	Poma	1500 people	1982	2.0m/s	6:00 mins	475m	76m
Drover's Dream	4 person chair, fixed	Leitner-Poma	2400 people	2004	2.2m/s	6:00 mins	710m	104m
Towers	4 person chair, fixed	Garaventa	2400 people	1999	2.0m/s	5:50 mins	634m	136m
Boardwalk	Conveyor lift	Sunkid	1500 people	2004	0.7m/s	2:10 mins	81m	-
Mouse Trap	Conveyor lift with enclosure	Sunkid	1500 people	2006	0.7m/s	3:30 mins	114m	-
Monkey Bar	1 person platter, fixed	Doppelmayr	792 people	2006	2.0m/s	2:30 mins	271m	33m
Lakeside	1 person poma, detachable	GMM	1000 people	1967	2.0m/s	7:20 mins	737m	140m
Scotts	4 person chair, fixed	Doppelmayr	2400 people	1989	2.3m/s	6:00 mins	760m	150m
Ruined Castle	4 person chair, fixed, with loading conveyor	Doppelmayr	2600 people	1995	2.0m/s	6:00 mins	651m	150m
The Tube	Conveyor lift	Sunkid	1500 people	2004	0.7m/s	-	-	-
Pete's Train	Conveyor lift	Sunkid	1500 people	2018	0.7m/s	-	-	-
Snowsports School	Conveyor lift	Sunkid	1500 people	-	0.7m/s	-	-	-

== History ==
After World War II, the Kiewa electrical scheme was started in the Kiewa River valley by the State Electricity Commission of Victoria. On land previously used only for summer cattle grazing in the natural alpine grasslands, the first ski lodge was built in 1948 by workers from the scheme. The first lift, a rope tow, was built in 1951 and the first chairlift in Australia was constructed there in 1957.

Falls Creek Post Office opened on 9 June 1958 (with telegraph and telephone facilities only until 1964).

The high plains in the area were used for summer cattle grazing from 1851 until 2005, when the Government of Victoria did not renew grazing licences due to concerns about the cattle's impact on the fragile alpine environment. Some of the cattlemen's huts still survive and are a tourist attraction in summer. Mount Bogong, Victoria's highest mountain, is nearby. The nearest town to Falls Creek is Mount Beauty.

In 2019, Vail Resorts announced the acquisition of Falls Creek and Hotham for AU$174 million, and today they operate three of the largest ski resorts in Australia, including Perisher Ski Resort in New South Wales.

== Climate ==
Falls Creek has a very cold Oceanic / Subpolar oceanic climate (Cfb / Cfc) under the −3 °C (27 °F) isotherm, or a Humid continental / Subarctic climate (Dfb / Dfc) under the 0 °C (32 °F) isotherm, with short, cool summers and cold, very snowy winters.

On 3 February 2023, Falls Creek reached a top of just 0.5 °C (32.9 °F). Falls Creek registered the lowest temperature recorded in Victoria (along with Omeo in June 1965); a reading of −11.7 °C (10.9 °F) on 3 July 1970.

Climate data for Falls Creek (1990–2023); 1,765 m AMSL; 36.87° S, 147.28° E
Month	Jan	Feb	Mar	Apr	May	Jun	Jul	Aug	Sep	Oct	Nov	Dec	Year
Record high °C (°F)	29.7 (85.5)	28.6 (83.5)	25.3 (77.5)	19.1 (66.4)	16.1 (61.0)	13.2 (55.8)	9.8 (49.6)	11.9 (53.4)	16.2 (61.2)	21.7 (71.1)	25.3 (77.5)	26.6 (79.9)	29.7 (85.5)
Mean maximum °C (°F)	24.6 (76.3)	23.2 (73.8)	20.3 (68.5)	15.5 (59.9)	12.1 (53.8)	8.9 (48.0)	6.3 (43.3)	7.4 (45.3)	11.7 (53.1)	16.8 (62.2)	19.9 (67.8)	22.3 (72.1)	25.5 (77.9)
Mean daily maximum °C (°F)	17.8 (64.0)	17.1 (62.8)	14.2 (57.6)	9.8 (49.6)	5.9 (42.6)	2.8 (37.0)	1.2 (34.2)	1.9 (35.4)	5.0 (41.0)	9.1 (48.4)	12.6 (54.7)	15.1 (59.2)	9.4 (48.9)
Daily mean °C (°F)	13.4 (56.1)	12.8 (55.0)	10.2 (50.4)	6.5 (43.7)	3.2 (37.8)	0.6 (33.1)	−0.9 (30.4)	−0.4 (31.3)	2.1 (35.8)	5.4 (41.7)	8.5 (47.3)	10.7 (51.3)	6.0 (42.8)
Mean daily minimum °C (°F)	8.9 (48.0)	8.5 (47.3)	6.2 (43.2)	3.2 (37.8)	0.5 (32.9)	−1.6 (29.1)	−2.9 (26.8)	−2.7 (27.1)	−0.8 (30.6)	1.6 (34.9)	4.4 (39.9)	6.3 (43.3)	2.6 (36.7)
Mean minimum °C (°F)	−0.1 (31.8)	−0.1 (31.8)	−1.7 (28.9)	−3.5 (25.7)	−5.1 (22.8)	−6.2 (20.8)	−6.6 (20.1)	−7.3 (18.9)	−6.5 (20.3)	−4.9 (23.2)	−3.8 (25.2)	−2.0 (28.4)	−7.9 (17.8)
Record low °C (°F)	−3.9 (25.0)	−3.9 (25.0)	−3.6 (25.5)	−6.9 (19.6)	−7.7 (18.1)	−8.6 (16.5)	−8.5 (16.7)	−9.6 (14.7)	−8.6 (16.5)	−7.0 (19.4)	−6.3 (20.7)	−4.8 (23.4)	−9.6 (14.7)
Average precipitation mm (inches)	114.5 (4.51)	91.5 (3.60)	107.1 (4.22)	101.1 (3.98)	103.8 (4.09)	143.9 (5.67)	96.2 (3.79)	106.2 (4.18)	119.9 (4.72)	142.3 (5.60)	134.3 (5.29)	104.9 (4.13)	1,366.6 (53.80)
Average precipitation days (≥ 0.2 mm)	10.6	10.4	11.0	11.1	11.9	14.4	15.1	15.2	14.4	13.2	12.7	10.4	150.4
Average afternoon relative humidity (%)	66	68	71	78	85	91	92	90	87	74	69	66	78
Source: Bureau of Meteorology

== Proposed developments ==
In 2009, the Falls Creek resort plan proposed replacing the Gully triple chair with a gondola, having a capacity of 1800 passengers per hour and a speed of up to 6 metres per second. This proposal also made its appearance in the 2016 masterplan, but nothing has resulted as of yet. It is worth noting that a gondola this short would be considerably expensive, where it would be much more cost effective to replace a much longer lift.

== Snowmaking ==
In 2021, Falls Creek invested AU$1.88 million into snowmaking machines. These new TechnoAlpin guns were placed along Wombats Ramble, Main Street and at the base of Drovers Dream. These snow machines now accompany the older snowmaking technology along Ruined Castle and Main Street.

== Notable seasons ==
2022 saw unusually large snowfalls in June, resulting in an established snowpack before the start of the ski season. As a result of this, Falls Creek and many other resorts opened to visitors one week early, with a snow depth of over 75cm at beginning of June.

== Notable racers ==
- Steven Lee, Olympic and World Cup alpine skier. Also a back-country tour guide for Falls Creek
- Malcolm Milne (born 1948), World Cup alpine racer, learned to ski at Falls Creek
- Ross Milne (1944–1964), learned to ski at Falls Creek.
- Britteny Cox (born 1994), Australian Mogul Skier and the youngest athlete to compete at the Vancouver 2010 Olympic Winter Games. 2017 – World Champion, World Cup Moguls Crystal Globe Winner, World Cup Freestyle Overall Crystal Globe Winner

== Notable snowboarders ==
- Scott James (born 1994), Australian Snowboarder, Australia's youngest male Olympian in 50 years and the youngest male competitor at the Vancouver Games. He won bronze in Men’s halfpipe at the 2018 Winter Olympics.

== See also ==
- Skiing in Australia
- Mt Hotham
- Perisher
