= Kiewa Hydroelectric Scheme =

Hydroelectric scheme in Victoria, Australia

The scheme as intended by the SECV in 1948

The Kiewa Hydroelectric Scheme is the largest hydro-electric scheme in the Australian state of Victoria and the second-largest in mainland Australia after the Snowy Mountains Scheme. The scheme is situated in the Australian Alps in north-eastern Victoria about 350 kilometres (220 miles) from Melbourne and is wholly owned by AGL Energy. In 2024, AGL studied the options of expanding the scheme with pumped-storage hydroelectricity.

The scheme was originally constructed between 1938 and 1961 by the State Electricity Commission of Victoria although it was privatised in the 1990s. The scheme was originally developed solely for electricity generation, unlike the Snowy Mountains Scheme, which was also intended to direct water west of the Snowy Mountains for purposes of irrigation.

== History ==
=== Inception ===
Work on the underground Power Station 4 (West Kiewa)

Hydroelectric power generation in the Mount Bogong–Feathertop–Hotham area was first proposed by a private company known as the Victorian Hydro-Electric Company (VHEC), established in 1911. The Kiewa River was the most desirable location for power generation.

In 1918 the Electricity Commissioners (later the State Electricity Commission of Victoria) was formed, and given a brief to investigate an alternate power-generation scheme to the burning of brown coal from the Latrobe Valley. In 1919 the Commissioners opposed the VHEC being allowed to generate power in the Upper Kiewa, but a Victorian Government found that the Kiewa scheme would produce 30 megawatts of power at a capital cost of $8 million. While the hydroelectricity was cheaper than burning brown coal, and would provide more energy than Melbourne then required, it was at a capital cost twice as much.

The SECV was formed on 10 January 1921, and allocated $2.86 million for power generation works at Yallourn. The SECV bought out the VHEC soon after, and in 1923 a series of technical investigations was undertaken into characteristics of rain and snowfall in the Australian Alps. It was found that local snow was more dense and soggier than that in Europe, and formed weighty blocks, but no further works were carried out by the SECV.

=== Work begins ===
Workers descend into Power Station 4

It was not until 1937 that the SECV recommended the Kiewa scheme proceed. The proposed works dwarfed those from 20 years earlier, with two large dams blocking saucer-shaped basins—Pretty Valley and Rocky Valley. The proposed generation capacity was 114.6 megawatts at peak load, with a 50% utilisation factor to cater for peak demand, rather than continuous load like the earlier plans. The scheme was approved, and a township at Bogong was established as the base camp for construction. Building materials for the scheme had been using the railway line via Everton Gap to Bright, then by road via Tawonga Gap.

World War II intervened, and drained men and materials from the scheme, and by 1940 there was little chance of the scheme operating by the planned date of winter 1942. Work was 12 months behind, and work was changed to focus on Clover Power Station (Number 3), work on the rest of the scheme being stopped in February 1942. It was not until 1943 that the associated Junction Dam was completed, the power station not producing power until 1944.

By 1945 only a small part of the scheme was complete, and power demand had risen during war. The SECV re-examined the scheme from 1947, and in 1948 an augmented program of work was approved. The size of the main reservoirs was expanded, and the catchment area was increased though the use of open aqueducts. Generation capacity was also increased, with a maximum output of 289 megawatts, double that of the 1937 scheme. The cost was to be $50.4 million (or 25.27 million pounds), and the generators would be located in a series of underground power stations, the first such installations in Australia. The town of Bogong was too restricted as a base camp, and the town of Mount Beauty was established at the foot of the mountains. The railhead for materials was moved to Bandiana, and the Kiewa Valley Highway was sealed and realigned for 50 miles (80 km) to Mount Beauty.

With fears of a new world war and a huge demand for electric power, by June 1951 works had reached full momentum, and the anticipated commissioning date of 1956 was considered achievable. Four thousand men were employed on the project, and works on went ahead with as much haste as funds could muster. Some in the SECV believed an equivalent quantity of power could be generated more cheaply from other sources, but abandonment was impossible in light of the need for additional capacity quickly.

=== Scaled back ===
Exterior of Clover Power Station (Number 3)

Junction Dam and Lake Guy in 1948, Bogong in the background

In 1952 a recession hit the Australian economy, with funds to the SECV from the Commonwealth Government were cut back, as was loan funding on the private market. The Victorian State Government provided its own funds to keep the scheme alive, but 1,500 men were still sacked on 27 September 1951, which slowed work to a snail's pace.

As the recession continued, then Prime Minister Robert Menzies was forced to cut spending on capital works. The Snowy Mountains Scheme, commenced in 1949 by the Commonwealth Government, was a source of national prestige and political advantage, and so the cuts were made to state government projects. Commonwealth loan funds were cut off to the Kiewa Scheme, and power from the Snowy Mountains Scheme would be provided to Victoria to fill the gap. Employment on Kiewa dwindled to one thousand men.

The Scheme was scaled back, with the major reservoir at Pretty Valley reduced to a minor diversion weir, and Number 5 Power Station in the West Kiewa Valley was abandoned.

By 1955 the West Kiewa Power Station (Number 4) commenced operation, in 1959 the Rocky Valley Dam was almost complete, and in 1960 the McKay Creek Power Station (Number 1) was commissioned, completing the scheme with 184 megawatts of generation capacity.

In 1957, the SECV publicly announced that the scheme should not be completed as originally proposed, and did not move to expand it for a decade afterwards, but still privately maintained that the scheme has never been finished.

=== Privatisation ===
With the privatisation of the State Electricity Commission of Victoria in the 1990s, the scheme passed to Southern Hydro, then acquired by AGL Energy in 2005.

AGL constructed the originally planned Bogong Power Station (Number 2), which was completed in November 2009 at a cost of $240 million. The work consisted of 5.7 km of a five-metre-diameter headrace tunnel, two vertical shafts, a 1 km steel-lined high-pressure tunnel, a power station to house twin 70 MW generators and a tailrace outfall into neighbouring Lake Guy.

The original Number 2 power station was to involve a dam below McKay Creek power station, and a surface power station of 95 MW capacity. However, due to environmental concerns the design was altered so that the McKay discharge would feed into the Bogong tunnel, leaving the river between them to run naturally.

The West Kiewa Power station is also being upgraded to a capacity of 74 MW.

== Components ==
The main reservoir of the scheme is the Rocky Valley Dam, which has a capacity of 28 billion litres and is situated at 1,600 metres above sea level. The scheme also contains a number of smaller dams and pondages. A great deal of the water in the dams comes from melting snow, which covers much of the area during cooler months.

Linking the reservoirs and power station are 11 miles (18 km) of tunnels, and 32 kilometres (20 mi) of aqueducts. The scheme consists of four power stations:

=== Power stations ===
No.	Power station	Max. capacity		Turbines	Completed	Coordinates
No.	Power station	MW	hp	Turbines	Completed	Coordinates
1	McKay Creek Power Station	150	200,000	6	1960	36°51′31″S 147°14′3″E
2	Bogong Power Station	140	190,000	2	2009	36°48′23″S 147°13′40″E
3	Clover Power Station	29	39,000	2	1944	36°47′8″S 147°13′14″E
4	West Kiewa Power Station	62	83,000	4	1955	36°45′36″S 147°11′10″E

=== Other components ===
Component	Location	Description	Notes
Rocky Valley Dam	36°52′27″S 147°17′38″E		
Rocky Valley Aqueduct	36°52′6″S 147°17′42″E	Diverts water south into Rocky Valley Dam	
Langford West Aqueduct	36°53′38″S 147°18′59″E	Diverts water north into Rocky Valley Dam from vicinity of Mt Cope	
Langford East Aqueduct	36°52′51″S 147°20′16″E	Diverts water east into Rocky Valley Dam	
Pretty Valley Pondage	36°53′56″S 147°14′19″E	Pondage for McKay Creek Power Station. Fed by tunnel from Rocky Valley Dam	
Cope East Aqueduct	36°55′57″S 147°16′8″E	Diverts water north through Cope Saddle into Pretty Valley Pondage	
Cope West Aqueduct	36°56′3″S 147°15′7″E	Diverts water north through Cope Saddle into Pretty Valley Pondage	
McKay Creek Power Station penstock	36°51′53″S 147°14′13″E	Carries water from Pretty Valley Pondage to McKay Creek Power Station	
Lake Guy	36°48′0″S 147°13′27″E	Pondage for Clover Power Station	
Clover Dam	36°46′52″S 147°13′7″E	Pondage for West Kiewa Power Station	
West Kiewa Power Station tailrace	36°44′40″S 147°10′4″E		
Mt Beauty Pondage	36°46′52″S 147°13′7″E	Regulation pondage below West Kiewa Power station	

== Gallery ==
Internal diagram of Clover Power Station (Number 3)

13-megawatt (17,000 hp) generators

12-megawatt (16,000 hp) turbines

== See also ==
- List of power stations in Victoria
- List of conventional hydroelectric power stations
