= Kiewa River =

River in Victoria, Australia

Kiewa River Kiewa River East branch, West Kiewa River (and various other forms)
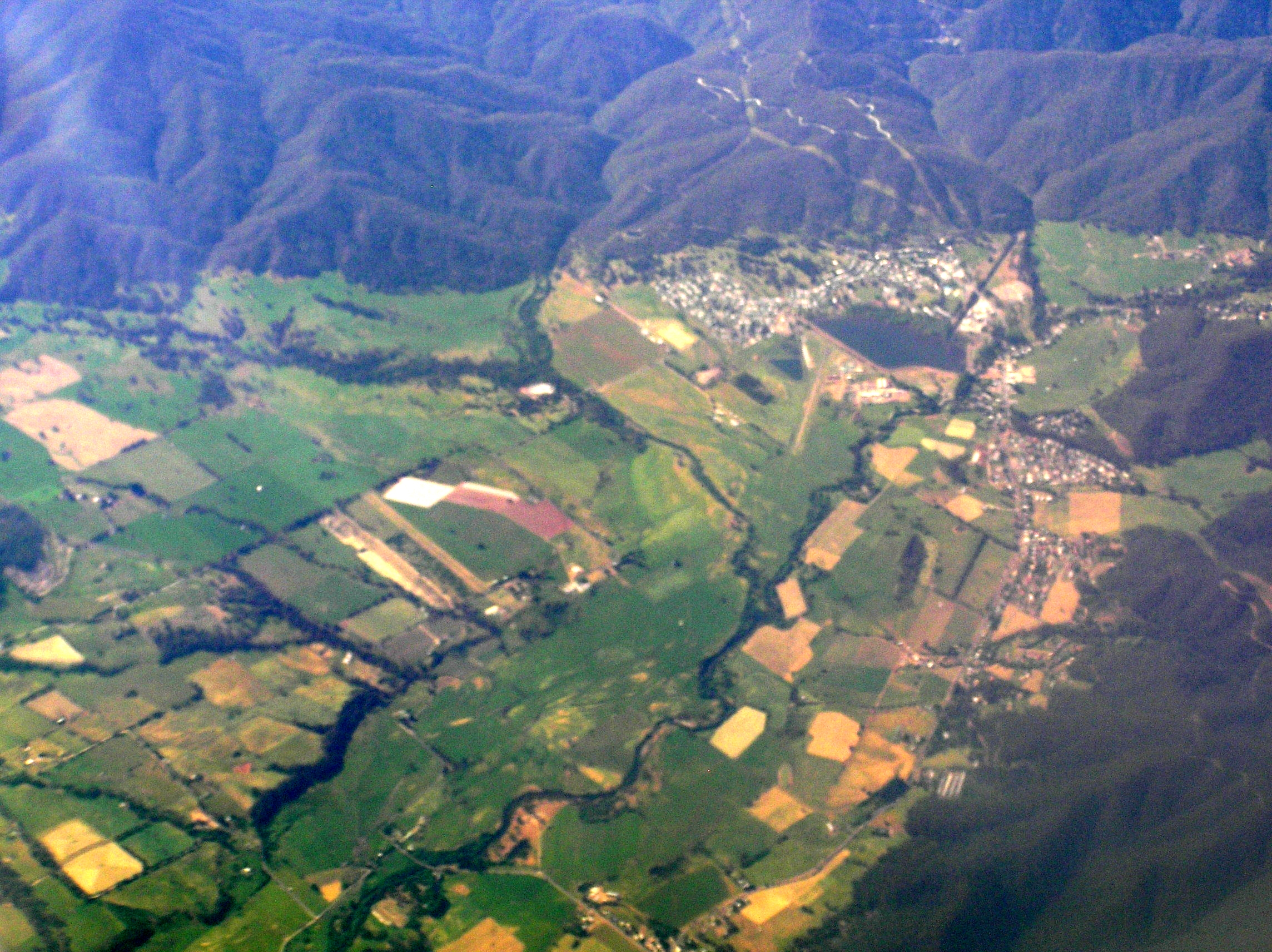
- Aerial view of Kiewa River, flowing through the town of Mount Beauty (upper right), 2009.

- Location of the Kiewa River mouth on the Victoria/New South Wales border
- Etymology: Aboriginal: cy-a-nun-a, sweet; wher-ra, water

Location
- Country: Australia
- State: Victoria
- Region: Victorian Alps (IBRA)
- Local government areas: Alpine, Indigo

Physical characteristics
- Source: Kiewa River East branch
  - location: below Mount Bogong, near Clover Power Station
  - coordinates: 36°47′57″S 147°13′28″E
  - elevation: 681 m (2,234 ft)
- Source confluence: West Kiewa River
  - location: below the town of Mount Beauty
  - coordinates: 36°43′00″S 147°9′29″E
- Mouth: confluence with the Murray River
  - location: southeast of Albury and east of Wondonga
  - coordinates: 36°6′49″S 146°56′51″E
  - elevation: 156 m (512 ft)
- Length: 109 km (68 mi)
- Basin size: 1,750 km^{2} (680 sq mi)

Basin features
- River system: North-East Murray catchment, Murray–Darling basin
- Tributaries
  - left: Pretty Valley Creek, Diamantina Creek, Running Creek (Victoria), Glen Creek (Victoria), House Creek (Victoria), Hellhole Creek, Yackandandah Creek
  - right: Rocky Valley Creek, Bogong Creek, Mountain Creek (Victoria), Gipsy Creek, Bay Creek, Mullagong Creek
- Reservoir: Lake Guy

Kiewa River, a perennial river that is part of the Murray catchment within the Murray-Darling basin, is located in the Alpine bioregion, in the Australian state of Victoria.

The Kiewa River is also known by several variations on its name in its upper reaches, variously named as Kiewa River East branch and West Kiewa River (or similar).

The name Kiewa is an Aboriginal word, derived from cy-a-nun-a, meaning sweet, and wher-ra, meaning water.

== Location and features ==
The river rises near Clover Power Station, on the slopes of Mount Bogong, the highest mountain in Victoria at 1,986 metres (6,516 ft). The main river is formed by the confluence of the Kiewa River East branch and West Kiewa River. The Kiewa River flows generally north northwest, joined by eleven minor tributaries, towards its confluence with the Murray River, southeast of Albury and east of Wodonga. The main river descends 525 metres (1,722 ft) over its 109 kilometres (68 mi) course, sedately through cleared farming country downstream of Mount Beauty; the West Kiewa River descends 850 metres (2,790 ft) over its 29 kilometres (18 mi) course, in near-pristine ash and peppermint forest country where the flow is swift, upstream of the town of Mount Beauty.

Snowfall is common in the upper reaches of the river during winter, with up to 230 centimetres (90 in) precipitation, mainly as snow.

The river is impounded by Lake Guy at 658 metres (2,159 ft) above sea level and other dams associated with the Kiewa Hydroelectric Scheme, which traps waters flowing from the Bogong High Plains. The McKay Creek and West Kiewa power stations are the major generating elements of the Scheme, which provides peak load to the Victorian electricity grid.

Within the Kiewa Valley are the towns of Mount Beauty, Tawonga, Tangambalanga/Kiewa Township, and Yackandandah. The river is crossed by the Murray Valley Highway at Killara, near its mouth. The Kiewa Valley Highway is located adjacent to much of the course of the river.

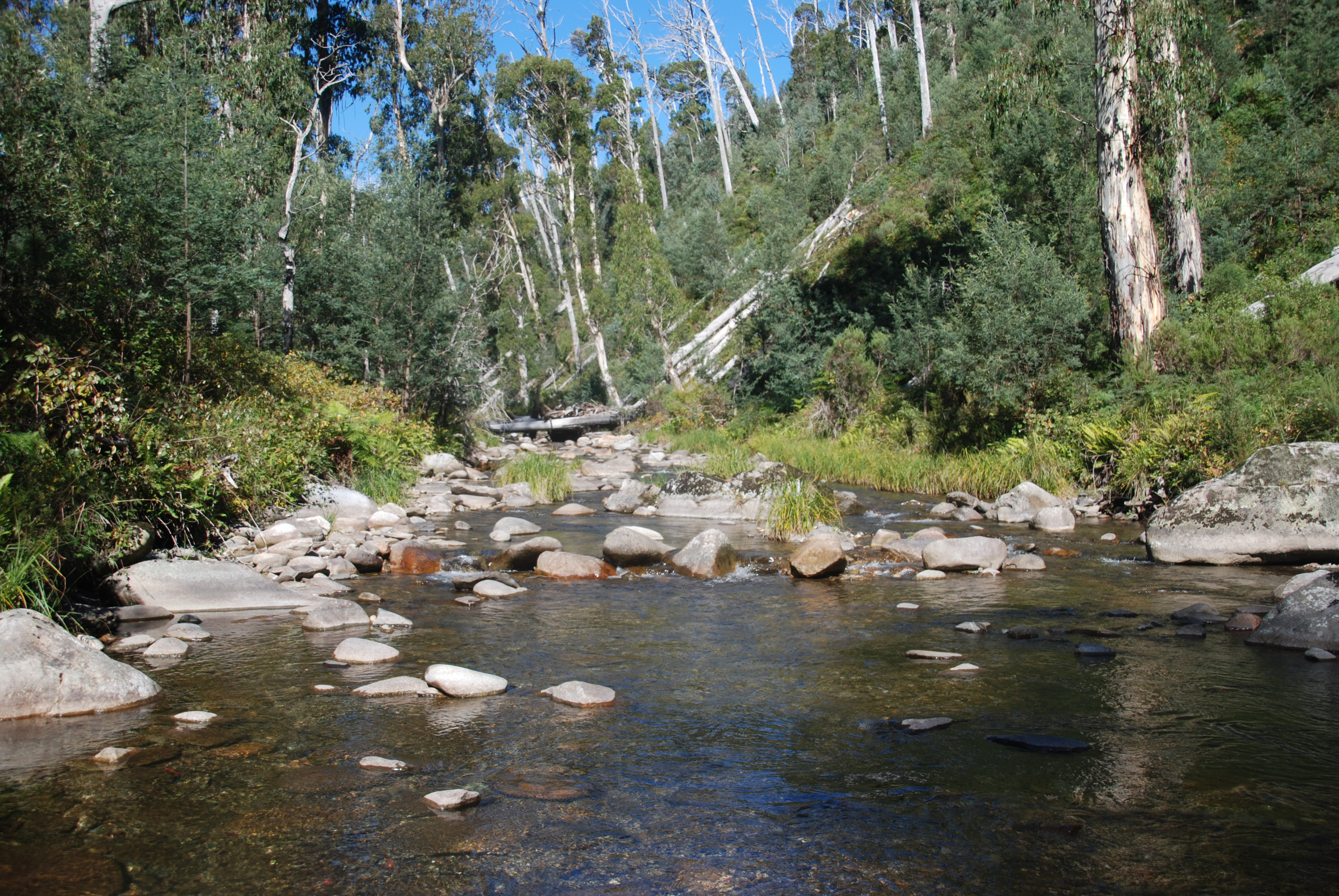
West branch of Kiewa River

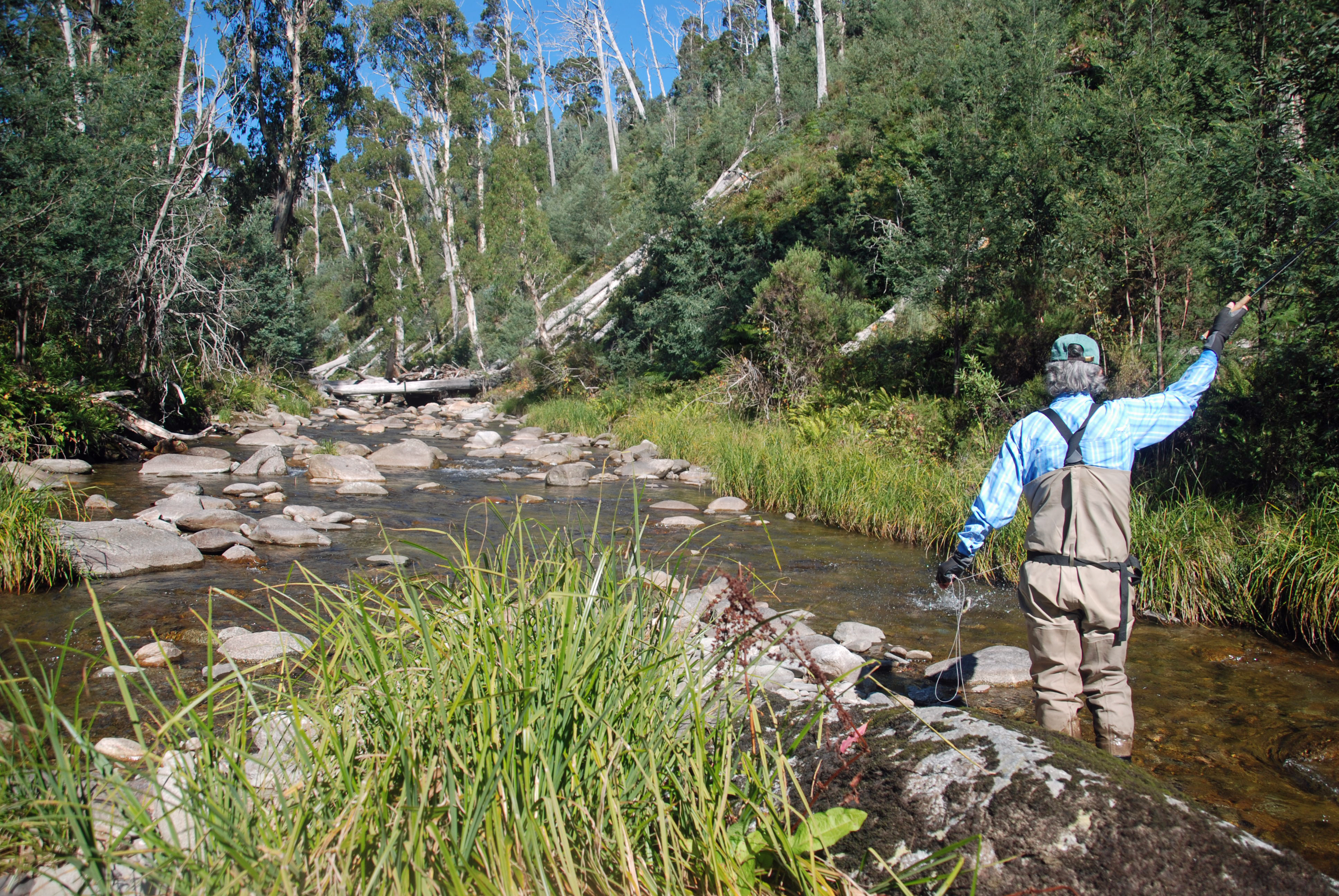
Fly fishing the west branch

== Recreation activities ==
Tawonga Huts, a series of huts and ruins, are located on the lower reaches of the West Kiewa River, within Alpine National Park and are accessible by experienced hikers. The Kiewa is a popular fly fishing stream for local anglers as it holds good populations of wild brown and rainbow trout. The East and West branches of the Kiewa provide important white water paddling opportunities for Victorian kayakers. The most reliable time to paddle is in spring during the snow melt. The upper reaches of the Kiewa River and the Bogong High Plains are a very popular area for cross-country skiing through winter and through to the early spring months.

== See also ==
- List of rivers of Australia § Victoria
- Skiing in Victoria, Australia
