= Peaks Challenge Falls Creek =

Challenging cycling event held in Australia

The Peaks Challenge Falls Creek (formerly 3 Peaks Challenge) is a challenging cycling event held in the Australian Alps region of Victoria in March each year.

It was launched by Bicycle Network in 2010, and aims to provide cyclists with one of the world’s toughest and most picturesque cycling challenges through Victoria’s Alpine region.

Starting and finishing at Falls Creek, the 235 km route incorporates more than 4,400 vertical metres with three major climbs – Tawonga Gap, Mount Hotham and Falls Creek. With climbs comparable to a stage in the Tour de France, riders must complete the circuit within 13 hours to receive a "Finisher’s Jersey". In 2013 a special jersey was introduced to recognise those cyclists who complete the event within 10 hours.

The cycling challenge attracts cyclists from around the world including countries such as the United Kingdom, Canada, United States, Hong Kong and New Zealand.

The event aims to provide a cycling experience inspired by European cycling challenges, while promoting the Falls Creek region and encouraging greater participation in cycling.

Event entry includes a controlled seeded wave start (descent down Falls Creek) with timed climbs, 85 km of road closures, mobile support teams – lead vehicle, SAG wagon, motorcycle marshals, mechanical support, seven rest areas with food, medical and mechanical support, post-ride food and celebration, food and clothing valet service.

The former fastest time ever at Peaks Challenge Falls Creek was set by Australian cyclist Ben Dyball in 2019, finishing with a time of 7:02:57. In 2024, Australian cyclist Mark O'Brien set the new course record - finishing in 6:43:13, becoming the first sub 7 finisher of the Peaks Challenge. The Strava segment can be found here.

== Course profile ==
The traditional route has little flat sections, with the majority of the ride either climbing or descending. The route starts at the top of Falls creek with a long descent to the valley floor of about 28 km. Immediately the first climb off Tawonga gap starts which is about 7 km long at an average gradient around 6%, rising just under 500 m from the start. Tawonga gap descends to Germantown at which point the main flat section of the route starts to Harrietville, a distance of 22 km rising no more than 200m along the length. At Harrietville the longest climb of the day starts to the top of Mount Hotham. This is a 30 km long climb broken into two 10 km steep sections averaging 6% gradient plus a flatter midsection at 2%. At the top of Mt Hotham a long descent to Omeo is started, which extends for some 50 km taking in Dinner plain along the way and a 4 km climb just before Omeo is reached. At Omeo a further 4 km climb is encountered along the road to the start of the climb to Falls Creek (known as "the back of Falls). The climb starts exactly on 200 km distance with the encounter of "WTF "corner", which is a 600 m section of road rising to 15% gradient. After this point is passed the rest of the climb for the next 9 km does not drop below 9% the whole way until Trapyard gap is reached. Here the road gets easier for the last 500 m vertical elevation to the summit, and the ride them is completed by a short descent into the township, around a mountain top reservoir.

== 2011 ==
More than 1,000 people participated in the 2011 ride. After more wet conditions, Nicholas Mitchell was the winner, with a time of 8:07:15.

3 Peaks Challenge 2011 Top 10
Place	Rider	Time
1	Nicholas Mitchell	8:07:15
2	Jason Spencer	8:48:32
3	Trevor Spencer	8:48:35
4	Piers Chamberlen	8:52:21
5	Dean Tonks	8:58:31
6	David Hatley	9:01:32
7	Jamin Hill	9:07:20
8	Warren Doyle	9:07:59
9	Alexandre Blanc	9:10:51
10	Joseph Krusec	9:12:28

== 2012 ==
In 2012 960 people started the event, 93% completed inside the time limit. The winner was Nicholas Mitchell with a time of 8:08:43.

3 Peaks Challenge 2012 Top 10
Place	Rider	Time
1	Nicholas Mitchell	8:08:43
2	James Nitis	8:29:57
3	Piers Chamberlen	8:31:36
4	Peter English	8:37:25
5	Olivier Pomie	8:37:30
6	Nathan Olsen	8:41:39
7	Gary Rubie	8:44:36
8	Peter Gleeson	8:44:44
9	Peter Reid	8:49:28
10	Fred Smith	8:49:53

== 2013 ==
In 2013 1300 started but only 83% finished. This year the route was changed due to the road to Mt Hotham subsiding as a consequence of bush fires and heavy rain. Instead the route was Tawonga gap, Mt Buffalo and the front of Falls Creek. The large number of people not finishing was mainly due to the extreme heat experienced in the day (in excess of 38 °C in the afternoon). The winner was Stephen Cunningham with a time of 7:23:28.

SCODY 3 Peaks Challenge 2013 Top 10
Place	Rider	Time
1	Stephen Cunningham	7:23:28
2	Alexander Davey	7:31:47
3	Connor Hughes	7:36:30
4	Alex Malone	7:41:47
5	Ronald Visser	7:43:11
6	Liam Kelly	7:43:58
7	David Evans	7:46:53
8	Ashley Hall	7:47:49
9	Tristan Bauer	7:49:42
10	Sam Walcher	7:54:02

== 2014 ==
In 2014 the event was sold out and 1781 riders started, 92% completing the ride inside the time limit. the course this year was the traditional route once more in ideal riding conditions. For the second year in a row, the winner was Stephen Cunningham with a time of 7:36:05.

SCODY 3 Peaks Challenge 2014 Top 10
Place	Rider	Time
1	Stephen Cunningham	7:36:05
2	Alex Davey	7:36:22
3	Steve Guy	7:42:27
4	Andrew Wagner	7:43:21
5	Andrew Bryant	7:54:30
6	Cameron Hughes	7:55:56
7	Simon Finch	8:02:12
8	Shawn Power	8:11:46
9	Matthew Payne	8:14:19
10	Ben Griffiths	8:14:29

== 2015 ==
The event has been renamed to "Falls Creek Peaks Challenge", and was again sold out. 1,895 started the event, with a 93% completion rate. The male winner was Andrew Bryant with a time of 7:13:00, which at the time was a new Peaks Challenge record. The female winner was Tanya Freschi with a time of 8:21:54.

== 2016-2018 ==
On Sunday 13 March, 2016, nearly 2,000 riders tackled Australia's toughest one-day challenge, Peaks Challenge Falls Creek. 88% of participants completed the course within the 13 hour deadline. In 2017 and 2018 over 1500 riders raced in Peaks Challenge Falls Creek.

== 2019 ==
On Sunday the 10th of March 2019, riders set off on the 10th anniversary of Peaks Challenge Falls Creek. At the time, this event saw the largest number of riders finish under the 8 hour mark. The first female to cross the line was Taryn Heather with a time of 7:50:34, at the time becoming the first ever female rider to finish under 8 hours. The first male finisher was Ben Dyball with a time of 7:02:57, the quickest time ever at Peaks Challenge Falls Creek.

== 2020 ==
In 2020 (the 11th edition) 1322 riders took on the course, with 1076 riders completing the course in under 13 hours. The first male finisher was Mark O'Brien with a time of 7:39:52, and the first female finisher was Justine Barrow with a time of 8:48:20.

Peaks Challenge 2020 Top 10
Place	Rider	Time
1	Mark O'Brien	7:39:52
2	Jay Vine	7:43:27
3	Carlos Domingues	7:46:52
4	Karl Ulbrich	8:02:55
5	Chris Ling	8:02:57
6	Francois Balland	8:05:38
7	Timothy Cameron	8:05:40
8	Leigh Phillips	8:08:38
9	Dylan McKenna	8:08:41
10	Stephen Lane	8:09:43

== 2021 ==
This year, King of the Peak (KOP, male), and Queen of the Peak (QOP, female) were introduced for the fastest time up Mount Hotham, Tawonga Gap (East), and Falls Creek (Omeo Side). Mark O'Brien won the King of Peaks by finishing all three climbs first, and he finished 12th overall. Justine Barrow won the Queen of Peaks by finishing first on all three of the climbs, and was also the first overall female finisher with a time of 7:34:21, a new course record.

Peaks Challenge 2021 Top 10
Place	Rider	Time
1	Stinus Kaempe	7:08:40
2	Francois Balland	7:11:09
3	Chris Hargreaves	7:11:28
4	Brendon Davids	7:13:46
5	Leigh Phillips	7:17:15
6	Chris Ling	7:20:46
7	Clint Perrett	7:20:53
8	Geoffrey Rickards	7:25:02
9	James Mortimer	7:25:43
10	Dylan McKenna	7:25:46

== 2022 ==
In 2022, 1426 riders finished Peaks Challenge Falls Creek within the time limit. The fastest male finisher was Jack Aitken with a time of 7:13:38, and the fastest female finisher was Emma Padovan with a time of 8:47:58.

Peaks Challenge 2022 Top 10
Place	Rider	Time
1	Jack Aitken	7:13:38
2	Angus Calder	7:27:59
3	Rob Redpath	7:33:11
4	Chris Ling	7:38:08
5	Daniel Forsythe	7:38:10
6	Daniel Potter	7:38:11
7	Clint Perrett	7:38:12
8	James Kelly	7:42:01
9	Michael O'Keeffe	7:43:12
10	Brent Ducker	7:44:11

== Awards ==
The event is recognised as Australia’s toughest single day cycling event, and in 2013 was named in Global Cycling Network’s Top 10 Best Sportives and Gran Fondos – one of only two events in the list outside of Europe.

In 2013, the ride was awarded as a finalist in the 'Adventure Tourism' category at the Victorian Tourism Awards.
