= Bogong, Victoria =

Bogong
- Town
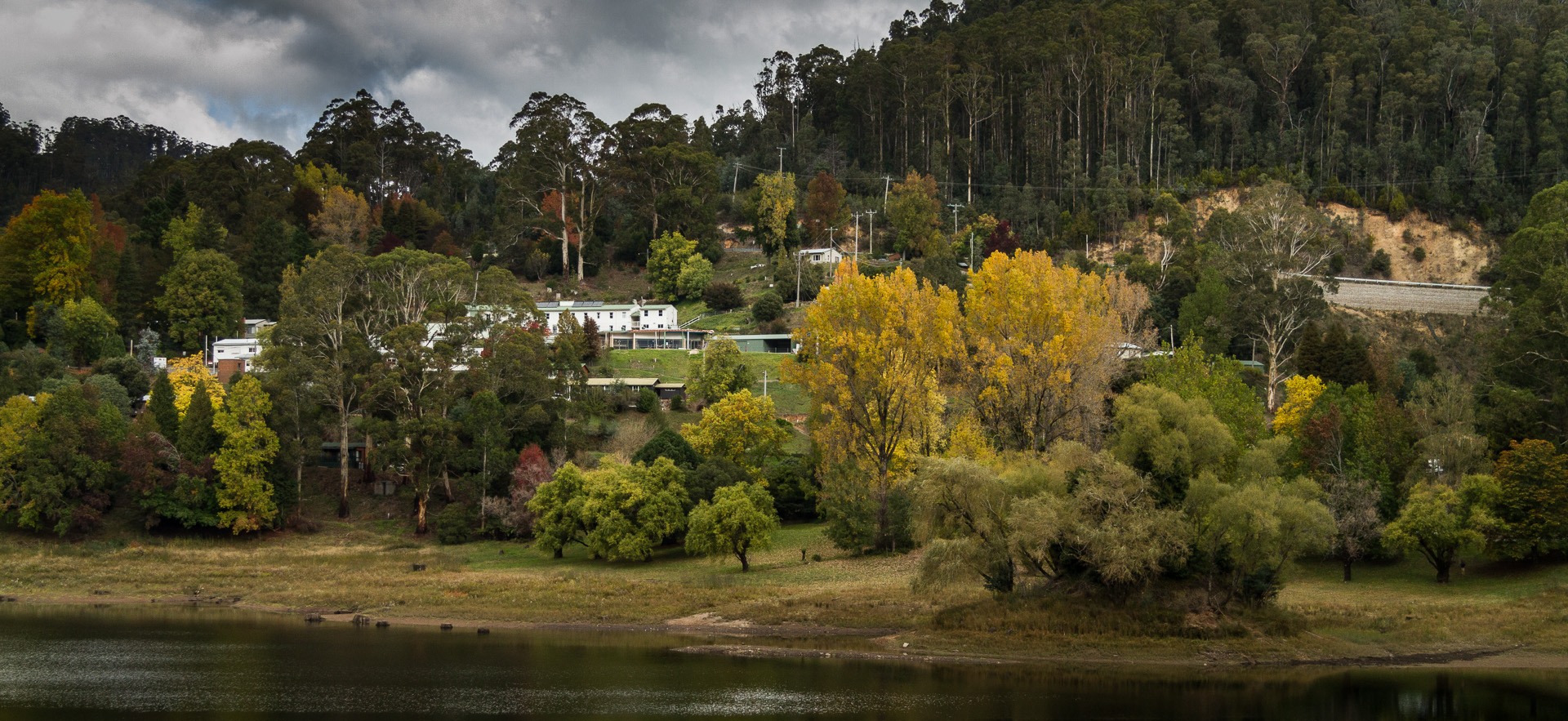
- Bogong, 2014

- Coordinates: 36°48′11″S 147°13′26″E
- Country: Australia
- State: Victoria
- Region: Hume
- LGA: Alpine Shire
- Location: 371 km (231 mi) NE of Melbourne; 100 km (62 mi) S of Wodonga; 15 km (9.3 mi) S of Mount Beauty

Government
  - State electorate: Ovens Valley
  - Federal division: Indi
- Elevation: 718 m (2,356 ft)

Population
  - Total: 0 (2021 census)
- Postcode: 3699
- Mean max temp: 17.4 °C (63.3 °F)
- Mean min temp: 5.8 °C (42.4 °F)
- Annual rainfall: 1,805.6 mm (71.09 in)

Bogong is a locality in north east Victoria, Australia. The locality is in the Alpine Shire local government area, 371 kilometres (231 mi) north east of the state capital, Melbourne.

At the 2016 census, Bogong had a population of 5.

== Bogong Football Club ==
The Bogong Football Club use to compete in the Yackandandah & District Football League from 1947 to 1953 and were runners up in 1948 and 1952 and won the 1950, 1951 and 1953 premierships and joined the Ovens & King Football League in 1954, then won 1955 O&KFL premiership. Bogong then played in the Tallangatta & District Football League from 1960 to 1963, then merged with Tawonga to form Bogong-Tawonga in 1964.

Bogong's Eric Tye won the 1960 Tallangatta & District Football League best and fairest award and was also deemed as the runner up in the 1961 award, under the old count back system. As of October 2025, Tye's 1961 medal "win" has never been acknowledged and Bogong FC have never received a retrospective medal from the T&DFL.

== Climate ==
Bogong is extraordinarily wet through the cooler months with snowfalls commonplace (averaging 5.7 snow days per annum), although maximum temperatures are not particularly low for its altitude due to its sheltered location in a valley (Tolmie has significantly lower maximum temperatures at only 120 metres higher). It is the wettest locality in Victoria and likewise mainland Australia's temperate zone, averaging 1,805.6 millimetres (71.09 in) per annum.

Climate data for Bogong (1938–1989); 718 m AMSL; 36.81° S, 147.22° E
| Month | Jan | Feb | Mar | Apr | May | Jun | Jul | Aug | Sep | Oct | Nov | Dec | Year |
|---|---|---|---|---|---|---|---|---|---|---|---|---|---|
| Record high °C (°F) | 38.3 (100.9) | 38.3 (100.9) | 33.9 (93.0) | 29.4 (84.9) | 22.8 (73.0) | 19.2 (66.6) | 17.1 (62.8) | 20.6 (69.1) | 22.2 (72.0) | 25.6 (78.1) | 31.1 (88.0) | 35.0 (95.0) | 38.3 (100.9) |
| Mean daily maximum °C (°F) | 26.0 (78.8) | 25.7 (78.3) | 23.5 (74.3) | 17.8 (64.0) | 13.2 (55.8) | 10.3 (50.5) | 8.9 (48.0) | 10.3 (50.5) | 13.7 (56.7) | 16.8 (62.2) | 19.8 (67.6) | 23.1 (73.6) | 17.4 (63.4) |
| Mean daily minimum °C (°F) | 10.8 (51.4) | 11.1 (52.0) | 9.5 (49.1) | 6.4 (43.5) | 3.8 (38.8) | 1.7 (35.1) | 0.9 (33.6) | 1.5 (34.7) | 3.0 (37.4) | 5.1 (41.2) | 6.9 (44.4) | 9.0 (48.2) | 5.8 (42.4) |
| Record low °C (°F) | 2.2 (36.0) | 2.2 (36.0) | 0.0 (32.0) | −0.6 (30.9) | −2.8 (27.0) | −4.4 (24.1) | −6.1 (21.0) | −6.0 (21.2) | −5.0 (23.0) | −3.3 (26.1) | −0.6 (30.9) | −1.1 (30.0) | −6.1 (21.0) |
| Average precipitation mm (inches) | 77.8 (3.06) | 71.3 (2.81) | 92.8 (3.65) | 127.5 (5.02) | 179.1 (7.05) | 193.6 (7.62) | 243.4 (9.58) | 242.5 (9.55) | 173.8 (6.84) | 171.4 (6.75) | 124.3 (4.89) | 101.3 (3.99) | 1,805.6 (71.09) |
| Average precipitation days (≥ 0.2 mm) | 7.5 | 6.6 | 7.9 | 9.7 | 13.8 | 14.6 | 16.9 | 17.3 | 14.5 | 14.4 | 11.9 | 9.3 | 144.4 |
| Average afternoon relative humidity (%) | 43 | 48 | 53 | 63 | 74 | 77 | 77 | 69 | 62 | 58 | 54 | 48 | 60 |
Source: Australian Bureau of Meteorology; Bogong
