= Mount McKay (Australia) =

Mountain in Victoria, Australia

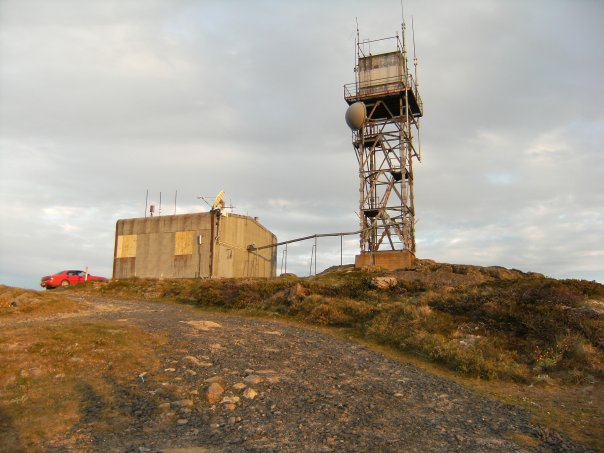
- Mount Mckay during summer

Highest point
- Elevation: 1,849 m (6,066 ft)AHD
- Prominence: 169 m (554 ft)
- Coordinates: 36°52′29″S 147°14′32″E

Geography
- Location within Victoria
- Location: Victoria, Australia
- Parent range: Australian Alps

Climbing
- Easiest route: Via Mount Beauty (town)

Mount McKay is a mountain in the Australian Alps region of Australia's Great Dividing Range. Skiing is possible during the winter. Nearby is the Falls Creek Alpine Village.

The summit is the highest drivable point in Australia at 1,848 m.

== See also ==
- Alpine National Park
- List of mountains in Australia § Victoria
