= Mount Beauty =

- Town
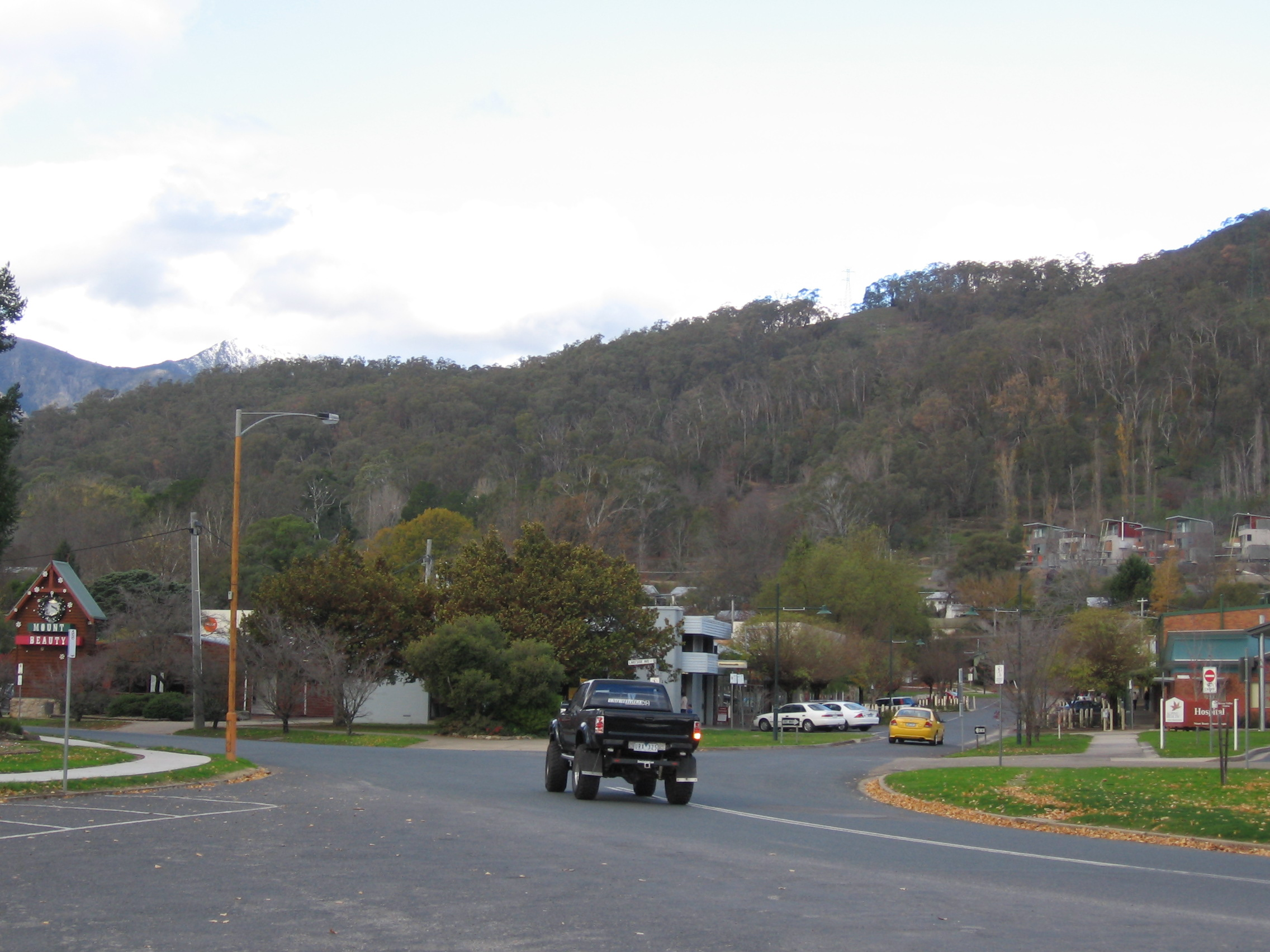
- Mount Beauty

- Interactive map of Mount Beauty
- Coordinates: 36°44′0″S 147°10′0″E
- Country: Australia
- State: Victoria
- Region: Hume
- LGA: Alpine Shire
- Location: 346 km (215 mi) from Melbourne; 133 km (83 mi) from Wangaratta; 32 km (20 mi) from Bright; 340 km (210 mi) from Bendigo

Government
  - State electorate: Ovens Valley
  - Federal division: Indi
- Elevation: 365.8 m (1,200 ft)

Population
  - Total: 910 (2021 census)
- Postcode: 3699
- Mean max temp: 20.0 °C (68.0 °F)
- Mean min temp: 7.3 °C (45.1 °F)
- Annual rainfall: 1,264.6 mm (49.79 in)

Mount Beauty is a town in north-eastern Victoria, Australia. The town lies alongside the Kiewa River, at the junction of the Kiewa Valley Highway and Bogong High Plains Road in the Alpine Shire local government area.

== History ==
The town was originally established by the State Electricity Commission of Victoria to house construction workers from the Kiewa Hydroelectric Scheme in 1949, passing to the control of the local shire council in 1967 after construction was completed.

Post Offices opened at Tawonga South (to the north) on 15 April 1943 and at Mount Beauty on 17 February 1947. Post Offices known as No 2 Camp, No 4 Camp, and No 5 Camp, Mount Beauty were open in the 1949–1953 period.

== Attractions ==
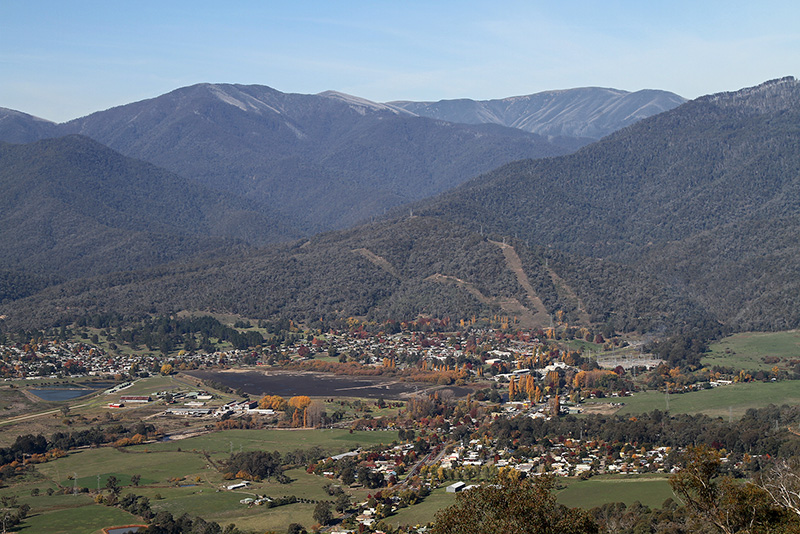
Mount Beauty township from Sullivans Lookout

The climate of Mount Beauty is truly seasonal, with chilling winters, cool wet springs, warm summers with blue skies and colourful autumns. Each season has its own attractions, including skiing, bushwalking, horse riding, gliding, bike riding (mountain and road) as well as fishing (river and lake). Mount Beauty has its own annual music festival, mountain bike competition and regular weekend markets on the first Saturday of each month. There are also many four wheel drive tracks in the local area.

The town is a launching point for trips to the Falls Creek ski resort, and to the Bogong High Plains. To this end there are several ski hire shops, eateries, and a bus company doing daily trips to and from the resort at Falls Creek, 32 km distant.

This town also has great views to the mountains, such as Mount Bogong and the peaks that are of interest to many of the tourists coming through the town.

== Climate ==
The town is quite wet with an average annual rainfall of 1,264.6 millimetres (49.79 in), falling largely in the winter months. It rains on 142 days of the year, with the majority of rain days between May and October. On account of its southern latitude there is a strong seasonal lag from springtime through to high summer (in line with its rainfall pattern). The site is at an elevation of 366 metres (1,201 ft) and it may snow on occasion.

Climate data for Mount Beauty (1948–1994, extremes 1965–1994); 366 m AMSL; 36.75° S, 147.16° E
Month	Jan	Feb	Mar	Apr	May	Jun	Jul	Aug	Sep	Oct	Nov	Dec	Year
Record high °C (°F)	41.1 (106.0)	42.5 (108.5)	37.6 (99.7)	31.1 (88.0)	25.0 (77.0)	20.5 (68.9)	20.0 (68.0)	21.7 (71.1)	27.2 (81.0)	29.7 (85.5)	38.0 (100.4)	39.0 (102.2)	42.5 (108.5)
Mean daily maximum °C (°F)	28.8 (83.8)	29.0 (84.2)	25.7 (78.3)	20.2 (68.4)	15.5 (59.9)	12.5 (54.5)	11.3 (52.3)	12.7 (54.9)	16.0 (60.8)	19.4 (66.9)	22.5 (72.5)	26.3 (79.3)	20.0 (68.0)
Mean daily minimum °C (°F)	12.5 (54.5)	13.1 (55.6)	10.8 (51.4)	7.5 (45.5)	4.9 (40.8)	2.7 (36.9)	2.1 (35.8)	3.0 (37.4)	4.6 (40.3)	6.9 (44.4)	8.6 (47.5)	11.0 (51.8)	7.3 (45.2)
Record low °C (°F)	2.0 (35.6)	2.6 (36.7)	0.0 (32.0)	−1.0 (30.2)	−2.2 (28.0)	−4.4 (24.1)	−6.7 (19.9)	−4.3 (24.3)	−2.8 (27.0)	−1.1 (30.0)	0.0 (32.0)	1.7 (35.1)	−6.7 (19.9)
Average precipitation mm (inches)	67.2 (2.65)	52.5 (2.07)	70.9 (2.79)	91.0 (3.58)	119.6 (4.71)	115.1 (4.53)	151.7 (5.97)	160.9 (6.33)	127.3 (5.01)	134.3 (5.29)	90.9 (3.58)	83.2 (3.28)	1,264.6 (49.79)
Average precipitation days (≥ 0.2 mm)	7.1	6.0	8.1	9.2	13.3	14.5	17.0	17.8	14.2	14.0	11.6	9.4	142.2
Average afternoon relative humidity (%)	39	43	49	56	66	71	69	64	59	55	50	48	56
Source: Australian Bureau of Meteorology; Mount Beauty

== Sports ==
The town in conjunction with neighbouring township Dederang has an Australian rules football team, Dederang-Mount Beauty, competing in the Tallangatta & District Football League.

Golfers play at the Mount Beauty Golf Club on Tawonga Crescent.

A hang gliding competition, the Bogong Cup, is held in January each year.

Mount Beauty also sport a Dragon Boat team, who train on one of local pondage lakes.

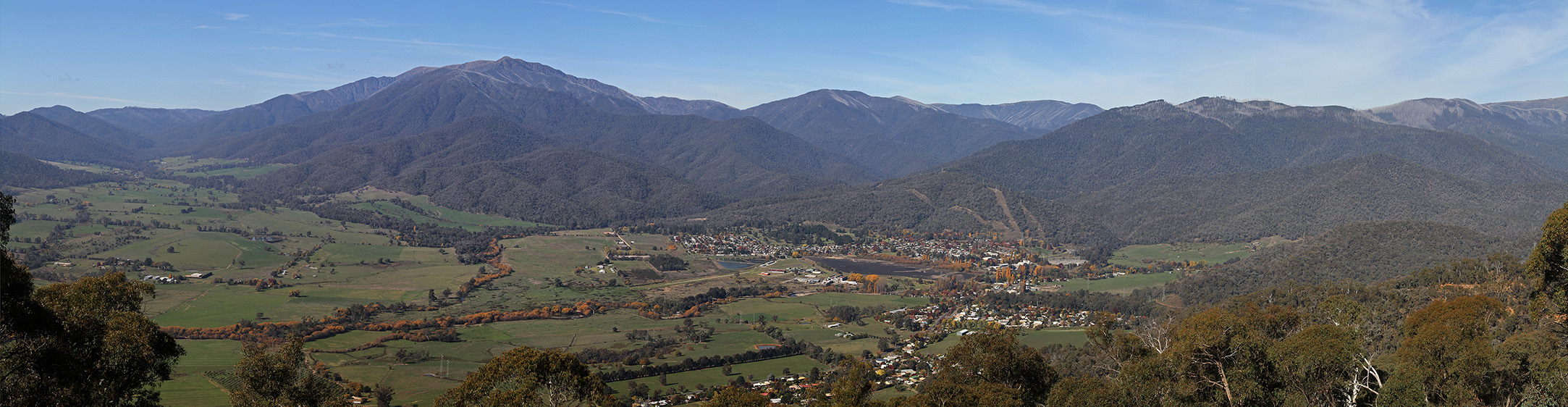
The town of Mount Beauty in the Kiewa Valley, nestled at the foot of Mount Bogong, Victoria's highest mountain at 1,986 metres (6,516 ft)
