= Victorian Alps =

Mountains in Victoria, Australia

- Victoria Alps, High Plains, High Country, The Alps
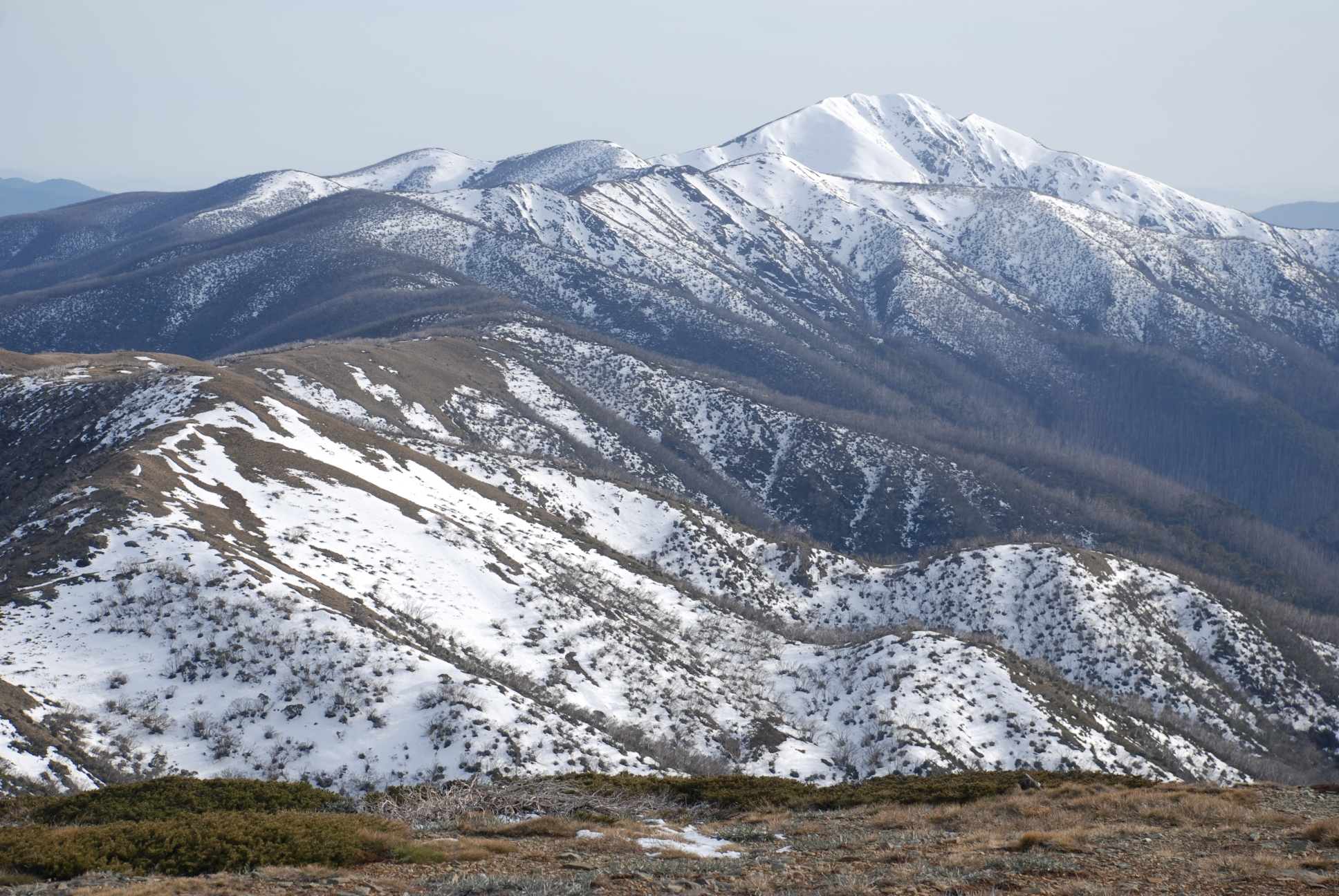
- Mount Feathertop and the Razorback

Highest point
- Peak: Mount Bogong
- Elevation: 1,986 m (6,516 ft); AHD
- Coordinates: 36°43′56″S 147°18′21″E

Dimensions
- Length: 400 km (250 mi) NE-SW (approx)
- Width: 200 km (120 mi) E-W (approx)
- Area: 5,199 km^{2} (2,007 mi^{2})

Geography
- Location within Victoria
- Country: Australia
- Region: Victoria
- Range coordinates: 36°44′S 147°18′E
- Parent range: Great Dividing Range
- Borders on: New South Wales

Geology
- Rock age: Devonian
- Rock types: Igneous; Sedimentary; Metamorphic

The Victorian Alps, also known locally as the High Country, is a large mountain system in the southeastern Australian state of Victoria. Occupying the majority of eastern Victoria, it is the southwestern half of the Australian Alps (the other half being the Snowy Mountains), the tallest portion of the Great Dividing Range. The Yarra and Dandenong Ranges, both sources of rivers and drinking water for Melbourne (Victoria's capital, largest city and home to three quarters of the state's population), are branches of the Victorian Alps.

The promise of gold in the mid-1800s, during the Victorian gold rush, led to the European settlement of the area. The region's rich natural resources brought a second wave of agricultural settlers; the foothills around the Victorian Alps today have a large agrarian sector, with significant cattle stations being sold in 2019 for over thirty million dollars. The Victorian Alps is also the source of many of Victoria's water ways, including Murray and Yarra Rivers and the Gippsland Lakes. The valleys beneath the high plains are surrounded by wineries and orchards because of this abundance of water. The region is also home to Victoria's largest national park, the Alpine National Park, which covers over 646,000 hectares (1,600,000 acres). The establishment of the Alpine National Park has meant that economic activities such as mining, logging and agriculture are limited, to preserve the natural ecosystem for visitors. Tourism within the region centres around snow sports in winter and various outdoor activities during the summer months.

The Australian Alps is an Interim Biogeographic Regionalisation for Australia sub-bioregion of approximately 519,866 hectares (1,284,620 acres), and an administrative sub-region of Victoria bordering the Gippsland and Hume regions.

== History ==
=== Indigenous heritage ===
The Victorian Alps were a significant meeting place for multiple Indigenous tribes from all-over South-east Australia. Seasonally Indigenous peoples from many tribes would meet at the highest peaks for trade, settling of disputes, marriage and initiation ceremonies. Whilst on the high plains the tribes would feast upon the bogong moth, a moth that migrates from breeding grounds in Queensland to the Victorian Alps during the summer months.

=== European exploration and settlement ===
Baron Ferdinand von Mueller, Angus McMillan and Alfred Howitt were some of the first Victorian settlers to explore the Victorian Alps in the early 1850s. Gold was found in the region in 1852 and brought thousands to the high plains. In search of grazing pastures men such as John Mitchell, George Gray, James Brown and John Wells travelled from central Victoria in what is now the Hume region to the Bogong high plains, settling in the area because of its abundance of natural grass fields. These early settlements were often seasonal as the harsh winter made grazing and mining impractical. The communities in the Victorian Alps were disconnected from Australian civilisation, which bred a distinctive way of life epitomised in the famed poem by Banjo Patterson, "The Man from Snowy River". After the Second World War a growing population increased the demand for timber from the Victorian Alps. This added growth to the economy of the area with the building of a series of roads, train-lines and bridges, the most prominent of these being the Great Alpine Road, a 308 km fully paved mountain pass that connects Bairnsdale in East Gippsland, to Wangaratta in Central Victoria. The road reaches an altitude of 1,845 metres (6,053 ft) AHD at a site called the cross, which is the highest section of sealed road in Australia; the site was a popular tourist destination with motorists in the 1920s and 1930s.

The introduction of snow-sports to Victoria began in the 1910s, with the government-funded building of the Mount Buffalo chalet. The chalet is the largest wooden building in Australia and was for many years the only ski field in the Victorian Alps. In the decades following skiing in the Alps grew slowly, predominantly centred around ski clubs such as the University Ski club which was founded in 1929 under the name Melbourne University Ski Club. In the early 1960s skiing began to evolve as ski fields started to install tow ropes and Austrian immigrants like Hans Grimus at Mount Buller and Peter Zirknisker at Mount Hotham, opened ski rental businesses and lodges at their respected mountains.

== Location and features ==
Comprising the Bogong High Plains, Bowen Range, Cathedral Range, Cobberas Range, and numerous other smaller ranges, the Victorian Alps include the Alpine Shire, parts of the East Gippsland Shire, and some parts of the Mansfield Shire local government areas. The Alps are sometimes called the High Plains or High Country. The 2016 Australian Bureau of Statistics census showed that the Alpine Shire had 12,337 permanent residents with 49.2% male and 50.8% female, and a median age of 49.

The highest peak in the range is Mount Bogong at an elevation of 1,986 metres (6,516 ft) AHD, which is also the highest peak in Victoria. Other prominent peaks within the region are as follows; Mount Feathertop at an elevation of 1,922 metres (6,306 ft) AHD, Mount Hotham at an elevation of 1,862 metres (6,109 ft) AHD and Mount Buffalo at an elevation of 1,723 metres (5,653 ft) AHD.

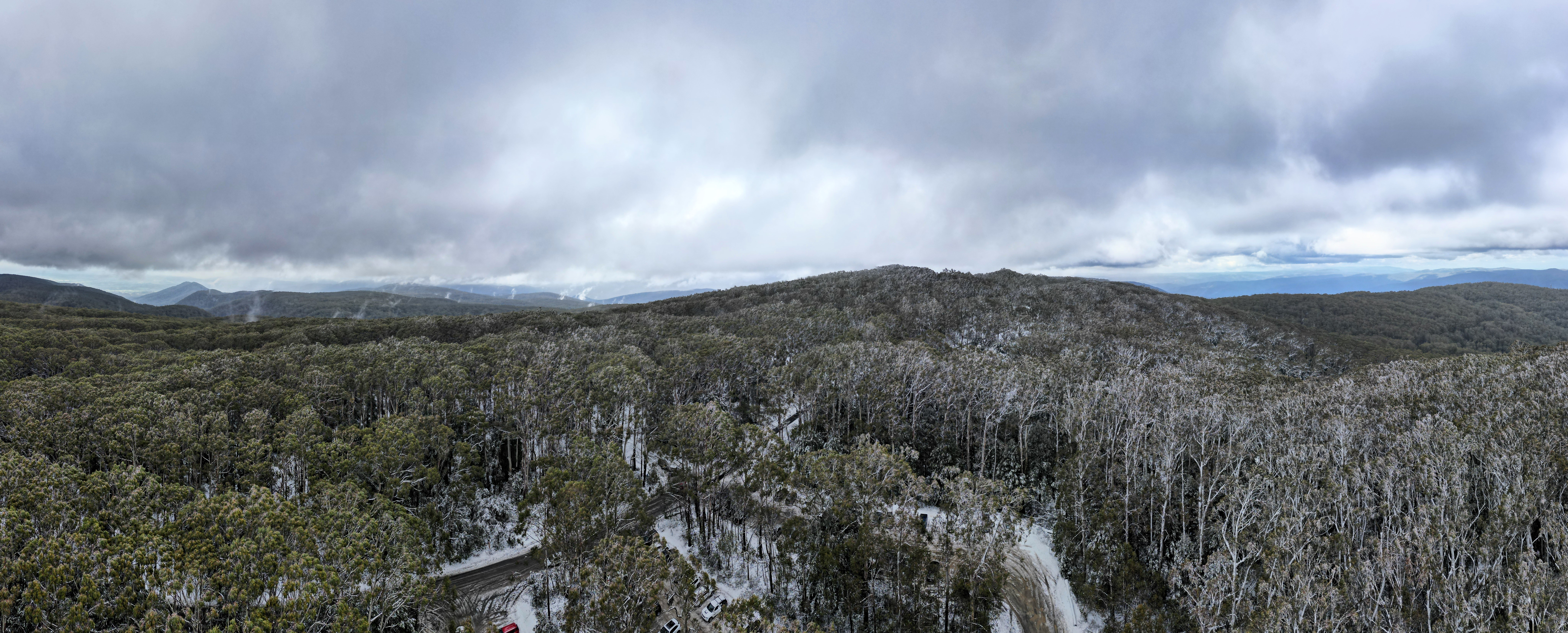
Aerial panorama of Mount Donna Buang. Flurry of snow in early spring. Shot on 9 September 2023.

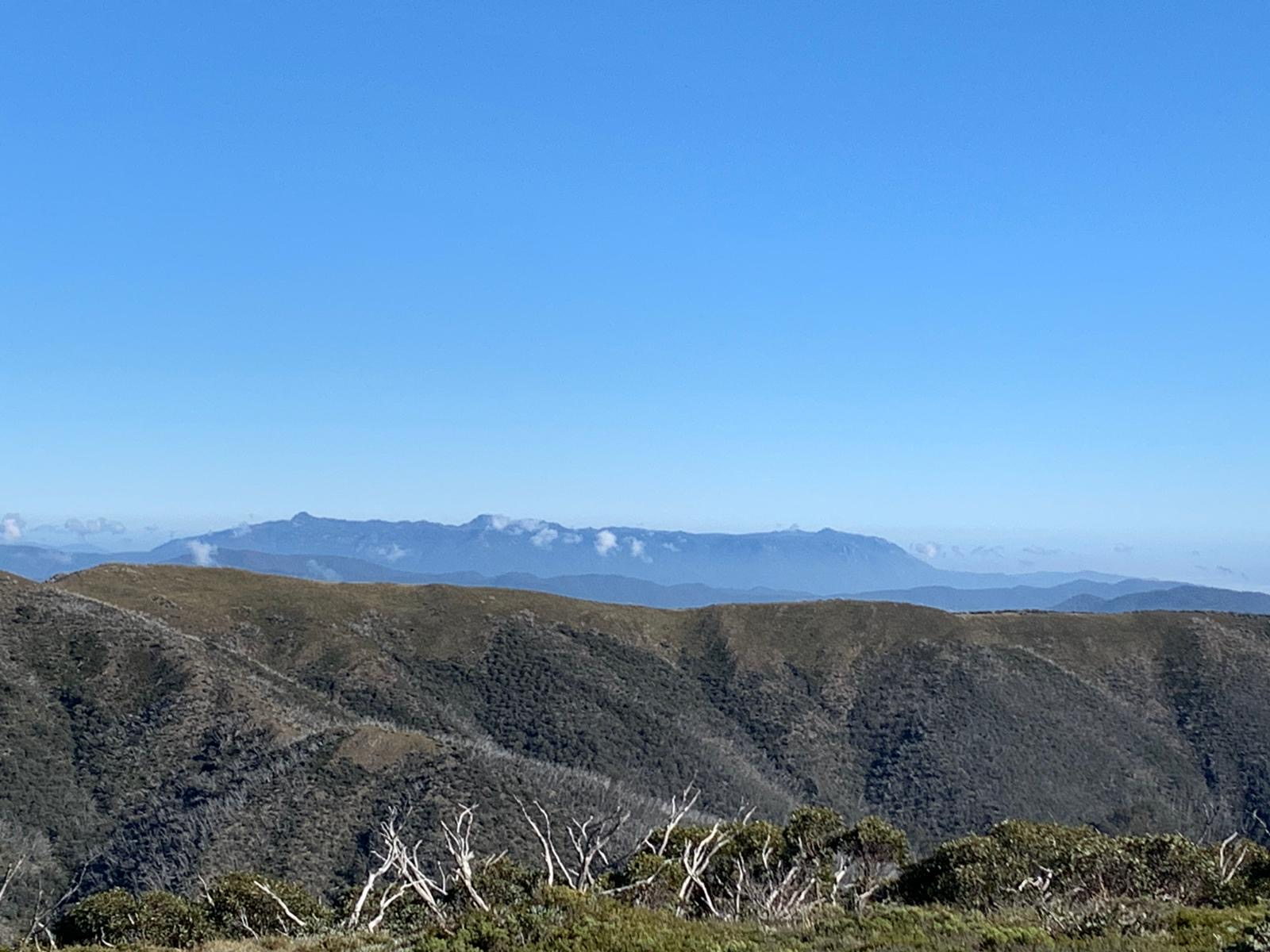
View of Mount Buffalo from Mount Hotham, in summer.

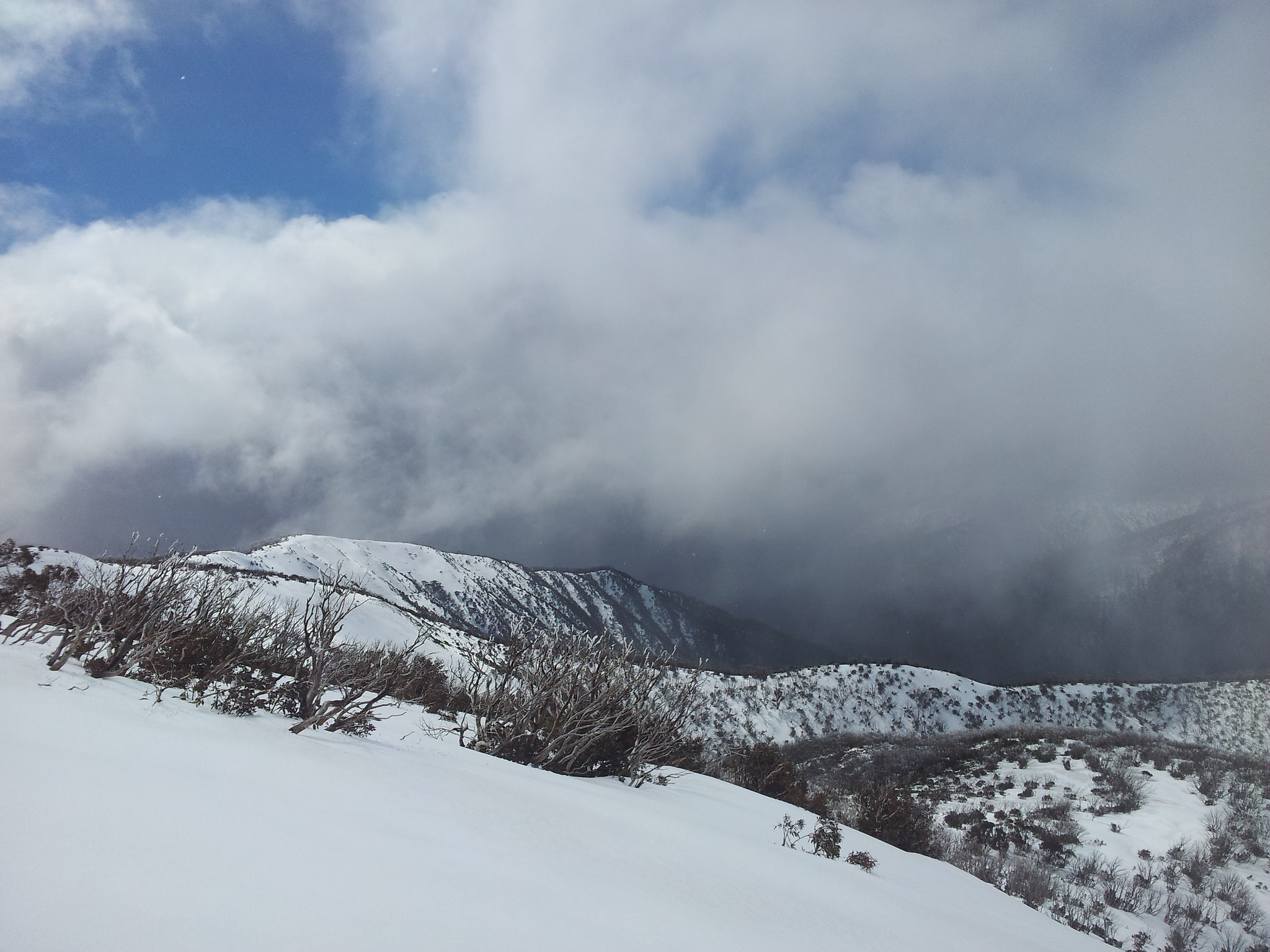
Mount Hotham in winter
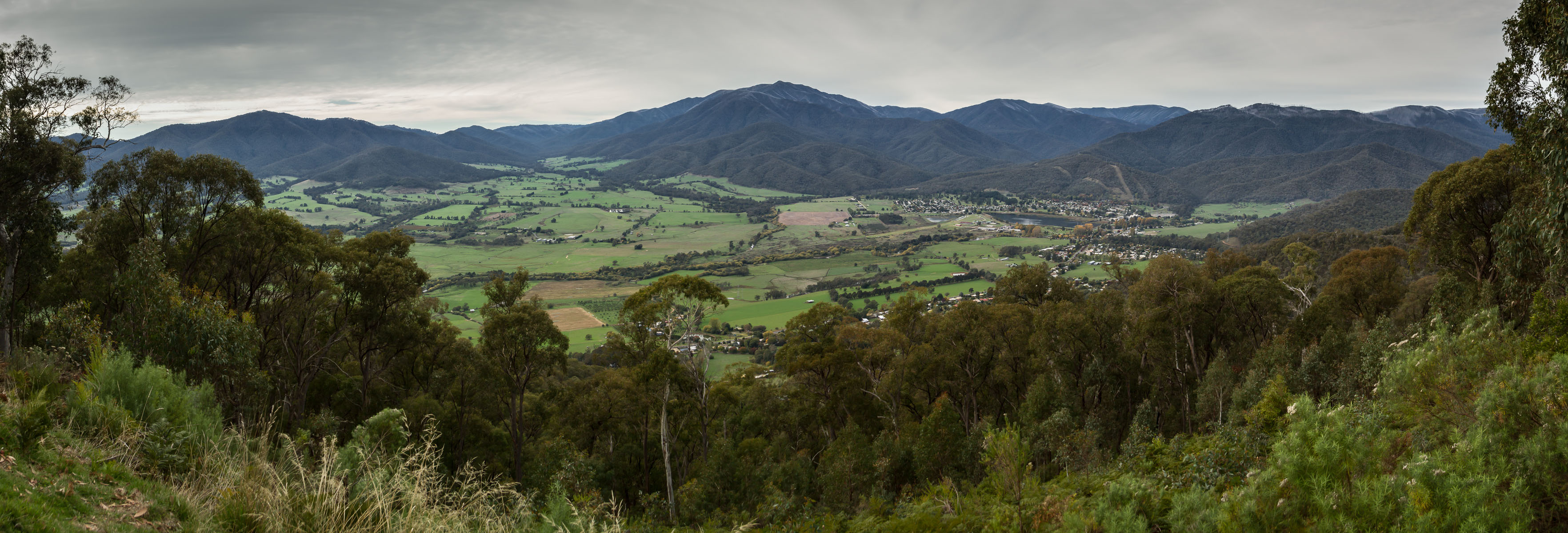
View of Mount Bogong above Mount Beauty, in summer.

== Flora and fauna ==
=== Flora ===
The majority of unique flora is found above the timberline at 1,500 metres (4,900 ft) AHD, the region above the forest of Eucalyptus (ADH). The unique flora includes the largest range of Tussock Grasses (Poa spp.), Herbaceous Daisies, Eyebrights and Carexes (small sedges) in Australia. Many other small vegetation ecosystems appear on the High Plains, including but not limited to Tussock grassland, Alpine shrubby heathland, Subalpine woodland and Tall Alpine herb field. Important or notable species within the Victorian alps include:

- Snow gum (Eucalyptus pauciflora)
- Snow daisies (Celmisia spp)
- Pineapple grass (Astelia alpina)
- Alpine trachymene (Trachymene humilis)
- Billy buttons (Craspedia spp.)
- Leafy bossiaea (Bossiaea foliosa)
- Grevillea (Grevillea australis)

=== Fauna ===
==== Mammals ====
The Victorian alps is home to a variety of small marsupials and mammals, many of which are found nowhere else on earth. The Mountain pygmy possum is a prime example of this endemism as it can only be found within the alpine regions of Victoria and NSW. Thought to be extinct until they were rediscovered in the 1960s at Mount Hotham, the Mountain pygmy possum is now on the critically endangered species list due to introduced predators like the fox, reduction in habitat and lowering number of the bogong moth. The region is also home to echidna, common wombat, wallaby, kangaroo and bush rat.

==== Other vertebrates ====
Other vertebrates found within the region include common native woodland bird species such as robins, sparrows, rosellas, fantails, currawongs and honeyeaters; as well as six species of frog and several variants of skink. The Alpine she oak Skink is on the endangered species list due to the severe fires in the region over the past decades. The Baw Baw frog is critically endangered with estimated number being below 1,000, the major threat to this species is a disease from the fungus Amphibian Chytrid called Chytridiomycosis. Mountain streams are also populated by species of small fish such as the mountain galaxias. There is very limited fauna diversity within the Victorian alps, due to the climate, and exposed conditions.

==== Introduced species ====
Introduced species are considerably dangerous to the delicate ecosystem that is the Victorian Alps. Red foxes are the fourth most common species found in the area due to the abundance of other introduced species such as rabbit and hare. Brumbies/wild Australian horses are also a major pest in the Victorian High Plains. The horse's hard hooves trample the local flora, because of this the Victorian Government has extended efforts to cull the wild horses from the national park. However initiatives to block the culling of brumbies, claiming they are "national icon", gained traction in May 2020, leading to the 2020 seasonal cull being put on hold. A supreme-court injunction led by Phillip Maguire has caused this halting of the cull, since petitions on Change.org, led by OCEAN LEGAL, have gathered more than 100,000 signatures in support of preventing the cull.

Other introduced species within the region include deer, pigs, goats, cats, trout and dogs. The Victorian Government's response to these “pests” in the national park involves extensive trapping and baiting schemes run by the Parks managers.

As well as wild pests, domesticated animals such as cattle and sheep were previously also found in the Victorian Alps. Cattle grazing can cause major disturbances to the natural flora and rare grass species found above the tree line, 1,500 metres (4,900 ft) AHD. The effect the cattle have on the environment is amplified through the short growing season for alpine flora, which means that once they are disturbed it can take a long time to recover. Because of the severity of damage to the Alpine national park flora the Victorian government banned cattle grazing in the park in 2015 as a part of the National Parks Amendment (Prohibiting Cattle Grazing) Bill 2015. Cobungra station, however, continues the tradition of alpine cattle grazing, without damaging the flora above the tree line as it is located between 1,500 m (4,900 ft) and 1,000 m (3,300 ft) in the foothills below Mount Hotham. Cobungra station is a significant staple of the Victorian alpine region since it boasts the largest wagyu station in the state.

== Geology ==
In the Victorian Alps, bedrock is exposed along the entire range. Because of the exposed bedrock, Geologists have been able to determine that the rock types at surface of the range today were formed in an ancient ocean, between 530 and 400 million years ago. The Mountains in the range are flat and round when compared other prominent ranges around the world, this is due to two main factors. Firstly the Victorian Alps originated through continental splitting; secondly the Victorian Alps were never tall enough to develop large glaciers, and it is the erosion from ice that produces jagged peaks. The Victorian Alps are still being influenced by plate tectonics today, as continental collision with New Zealand drives the range up each year. This contradicts earlier theories about the range, which assumed the mountains size was due to years of erosion, in fact it is now believed that the Australian Alps are a relatively young range, forming their current peaks in the last 10 million years.

== Water catchment ==
The Victorian Alps receive some of the most rainfall in Victoria with locations such as Falls Creek elevation 1,765 metres (5,791 ft) AHD receiving an average of 12,273 millimetres (40.266 ft) annually from 1990 to 2020. The high volumes of water that fall within the region, feed waterways such as the Yarra river, and Gippsland lakes. The Murray River is also fed by the Victorian Alps, and although the region only accounts for 1% of the Murray's catchment area it is estimated to provide over 29% to the annual flow. This is due to the high amounts of snow, and the unique alpine vegetation which has the ability to hold water and regulate its release throughout the year. Water from the Victorian Alps is also used for power generation at the Kiewa Hydroelectric scheme, which generates 241MW of power.

== Recreation ==
=== Winter recreation ===
In the winter the main attraction in the Victorian Alps is the ski fields, the largest of which by number of lifts is Mount Buller and the largest of which by skiable terrain is Mount Hotham. Other Victorian ski fields include Mount Baw Baw, Mount Stirling, Lake Mountain, Falls Creek and previously Mount Buffalo. Ski touring within the Victorian Alps is also very popular with famed routes such as the Twin Valleys, Mount Bogong, Feathertop Ridge and other Mount Hotham side country routes. There are many converted cattleman's huts that litter the alpine landscape to accommodate such activities. On the whole the snow-sports industry brought over $911 million of gross state profit to the Victorian economy in the 2016/2017 financial year. Over the same period the region saw over 762,981 visitors across ski season which produced almost 1.4 million visitor nights.

=== Summer recreation ===
Summer recreation brings in lower annual visitor numbers as seen over the summer months in 2016/2017, when the region received 348,366 tourist for a total of 485,722 visitor days. Large events such as the Peaks Challenge which sees cyclists ride 235 km through the High Plains, contribute to these numbers. The Dinner Plain Polo is another yearly event that sees a rise in tourist numbers in the area. Founded 31 years ago, the Dinner Plain Polo is the longest, and highest in altitude running polo competition in Australia. Bushwalking is also a large part of summer recreation in the Victorian Alps. The recently finished Mount Hotham to Falls Creek overnight walking track spans some of the highest regions of the Victorian Alps, with overnight stops at both Cope and Dibbins hut; the walk is 37 kilometres in total. Other summer activities that draw visitors to the Victorian Alps include mountain biking (at Lake Mountain, Mount Baw Baw, Mount Beauty, Mount Buller, Bright, Falls Creek, Dinner Plain amongst others), rock climbing (particularly at Mount Buffalo), trout fishing and horse riding.

== See also ==
- Skiing in Australia
- Geography of Victoria
- List of mountains in Australia
