= G. australis =

G. australis may refer to:

- Gallirallus australis, the weka or woodhen, a flightless bird species endemic to New Zealand
- Grevillea australis, a plant species found in Tasmania

== See also ==
- Australis (disambiguation)
