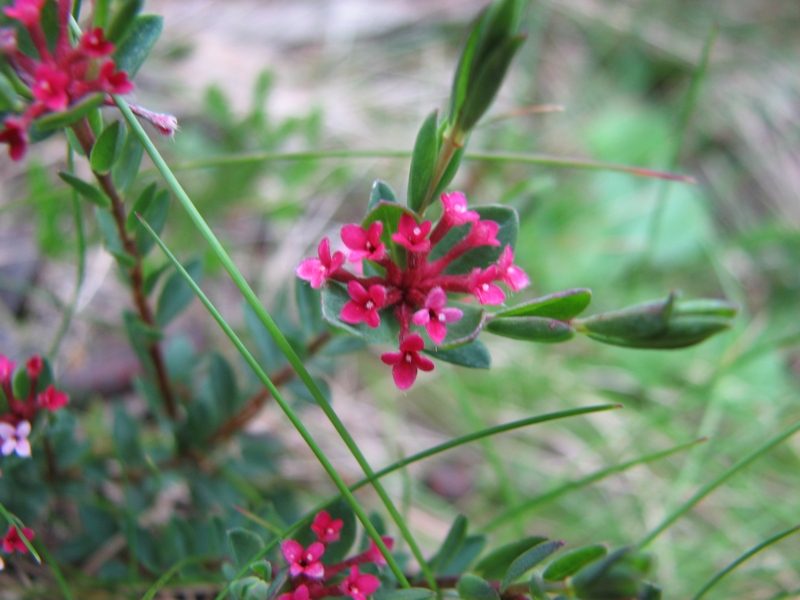

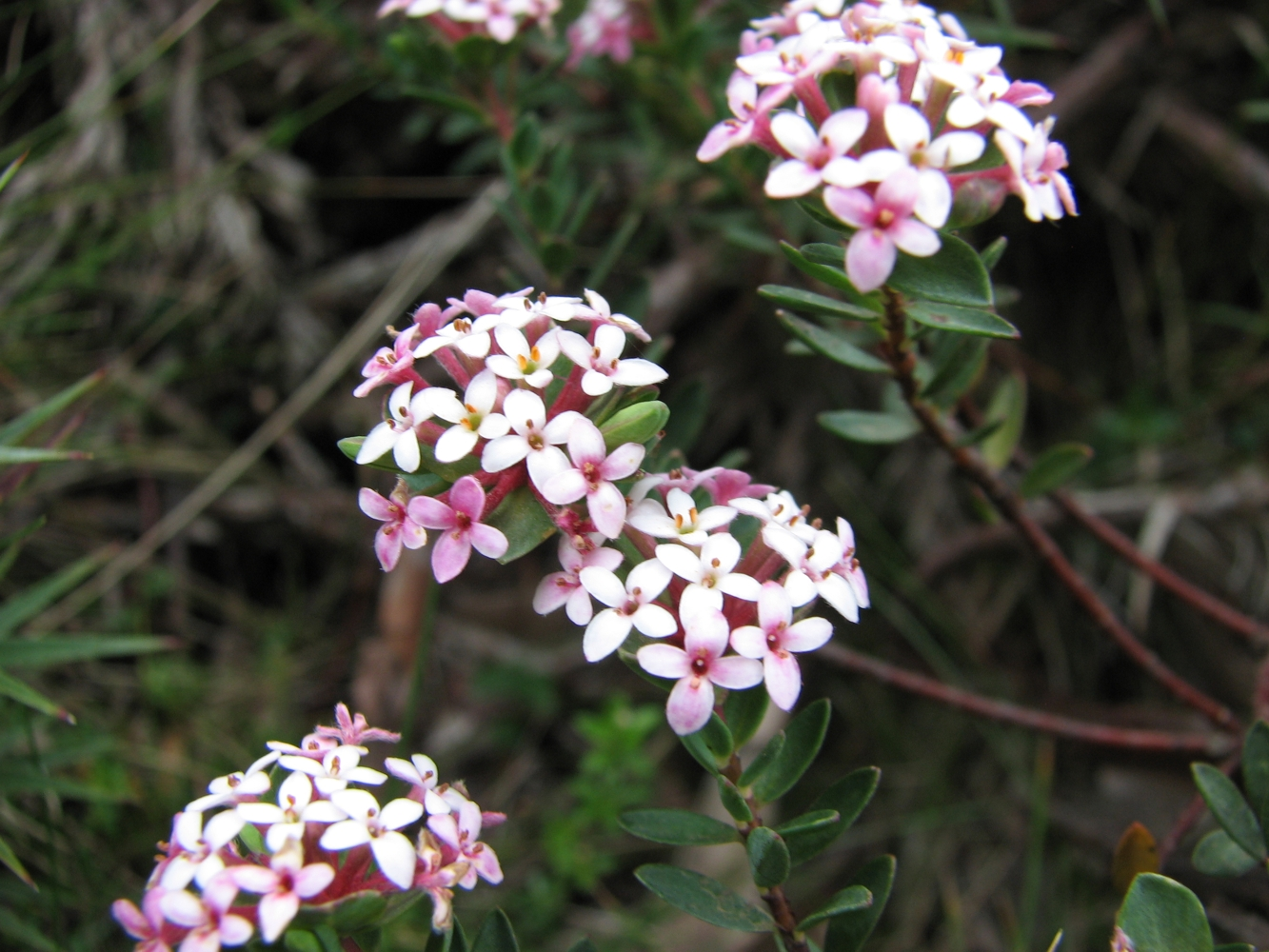
- Colour variation at Baw Baw National Park

Scientific classification
- Kingdom: Plantae
- Clade: Tracheophytes
- Clade: Angiosperms
- Clade: Eudicots
- Clade: Rosids
- Order: Malvales
- Family: Thymelaeaceae
- Genus: Pimelea
- Species: P. alpina

Binomial name
- Pimelea alpina F.Muell. ex Meisn.

Synonyms
- Banksia alpina (Meisn.) Kuntze

= Pimelea alpina =

Species of shrub

Pimelea alpina, the alpine rice-flower, is a species of flowering plant in the family Thymelaeaceae and is endemic to south-eastern continental Australia. It is an erect, prostrate or spreading shrub or undershrub with narrowly elliptic leaves crowded at the ends of branches and heads of pinkish red or white flowers.

== Description ==
Pimelea alpina is an erect, or prostrate or spreading shrub or undershrub that typically grows to a height of 15–30 cm (5.9–11.8 in) and has glabrous stems. The leaves are arranged in opposite pairs, mostly crowded at the end of branches, and are narrowly elliptic, 3–13 mm (0.12–0.51 in) long and 1–5 mm (0.039–0.197 in) wide. The flowers are borne in heads of 5 to 18 on a peduncle up to 2.5 mm (0.098 in) long with four elliptic to egg-shaped bracts 5–7 mm (0.20–0.28 in) long at the base of the head. The flowers are usually pinkish red, rarely white, the floral cup 3.5–6.0 mm (0.14–0.24 in) long and the sepals about 2 mm (0.079 in) long, the stamens shorter than the sepals. Flowering occurs from July to March, the fruit is 3–4 mm (0.12–0.16 in) long and green, enclosed in the remains of the floral cup.

== Taxonomy ==
Pimelea alpina was first formally described in 1857 by Carl Meissner in Prodromus Systematis Naturalis Regni Vegetabilis from an unpublished description by Ferdinand von Mueller of specimens he collected in the Cobberas Range.

== Distribution and habitat ==
Alpine rice-flower occurs in woodland, heath or grassland in alpine and sub-alpine areas at altitudes between 1,500 and 2,000 m (4,900 and 6,600 ft) in the Snowy Mountains of New South Wales and the eastern highlands of Victoria.
