= Cobberas Range =

Mountain range in Victoria, Australia

- Location within Victoria

Highest point
- Peak: Cobberas No. 1, Alpine National Park
- Elevation: 1,810 m (5,940 ft); AHD
- Coordinates: 36°51′44″S 148°09′05″E

Geography
- Country: Australia
- State: Victoria
- Parent range: Great Dividing Range

The Cobberas Range, a mountain range that is part of the Great Dividing Range within the Victorian Alps, is located in north-eastern Victoria in Australia. The range is located in the Cobberas Wilderness area of the Alpine National Park.

Peaks include:

- Mount Cobberas No. 1, at 1,810 metres (5,940 ft)
- Mount Cobberas No. 2
- Moscow Peak
- Middle Peak
- Cleft Peak

In January 1854, Victorian Government Botanist Ferdinand von Mueller passed through the area on the second of his three expeditions to the Alps. He collected many plants, many of which had not been previously recorded.

== See also ==
- Alpine National Park
- List of mountains in Australia § Victoria
