= Mount Feathertop =

Mountain in Victoria, Australia

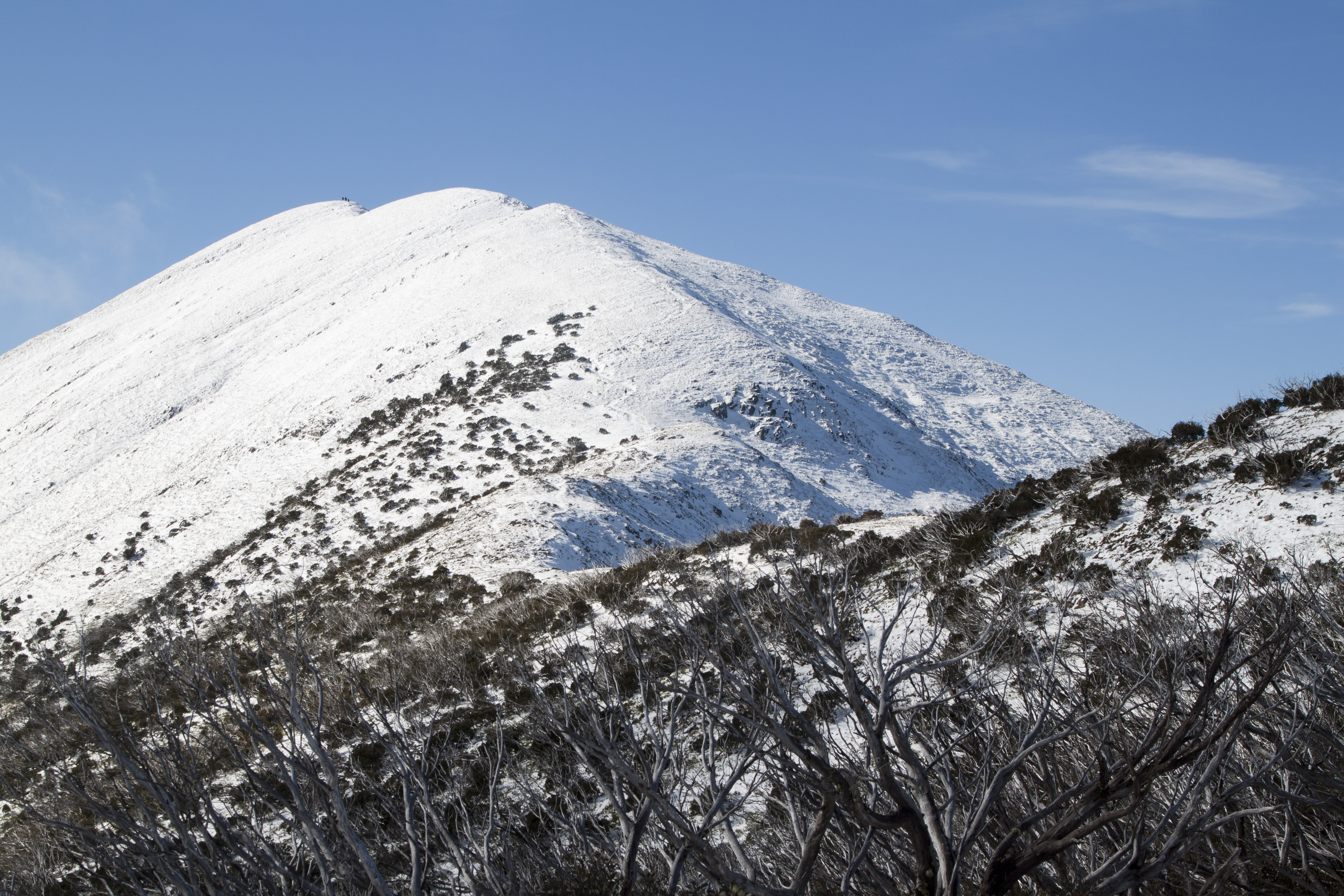
- Mount Feathertop as seen from the summit track

Highest point
- Elevation: 1,922 m (6,306 ft) (AHD)
- Prominence: 562 m (1,844 ft) (AHD)
- Coordinates: 36°53′39″S 147°8′18″E

Geography
- Location within Alpine Shire
- Location: Alpine National Park, Victoria, Australia
- Parent range: Victorian Alps, Great Dividing Range

Climbing
- First ascent: 1853: von Mueller (European)
- Easiest route: Hike / ski: North Razorback track

Mount Feathertop is the second-highest mountain in the Australian state of Victoria. It is part of the Australian Alps and is located within the Alpine National Park. It rises to 1,922 metres (6,306 ft) and is usually covered in snow from June to September. Unlike most mountains in the Victorian part of the Australian Alps, Mount Feathertop has steep summit slopes instead of a rounded summit dome. Snow remaining in the summit gullies until late spring gives the appearance of feathers, hence the name.

Mount Feathertop's proximity to the Mount Hotham ski resort has led to it becoming a popular backcountry skiing destination. A large and highly dangerous snow cornice usually forms along the summit ridge in winter and early spring; the collapse of which has claimed the lives of several people who have (usually unwittingly) stood on it or too close to it. It is also known for its often dangerously icy slopes on which skiers and walkers have lost their footing with fatal results.

== History ==
Mount Feathertop was sighted and named in early 1851 by Jim Brown and Jack Wells, stockmen from Cobungra Station. Whilst looking for summer pastures, they became the first non-Aboriginal people to systematically explore and name locations around the Bogong High Plains. They named the mountain after the feather-shaped plume of cloud that is often seen downwind from the summit. They dubbed nearby Mount Hotham "Baldy".

In the 19th and early 20th centuries, the mountain hosted gold mines and mountain cattlemen, but as the gold ran out, the activity it provided on Feathertop was replaced by tourism. The Feathertop Bungalow operated as a commercial ski lodge from 1925 to 1939 and the mountain almost became a major ski resort. Today it has reverted to a relatively isolated and undeveloped peak with only two refuge huts.

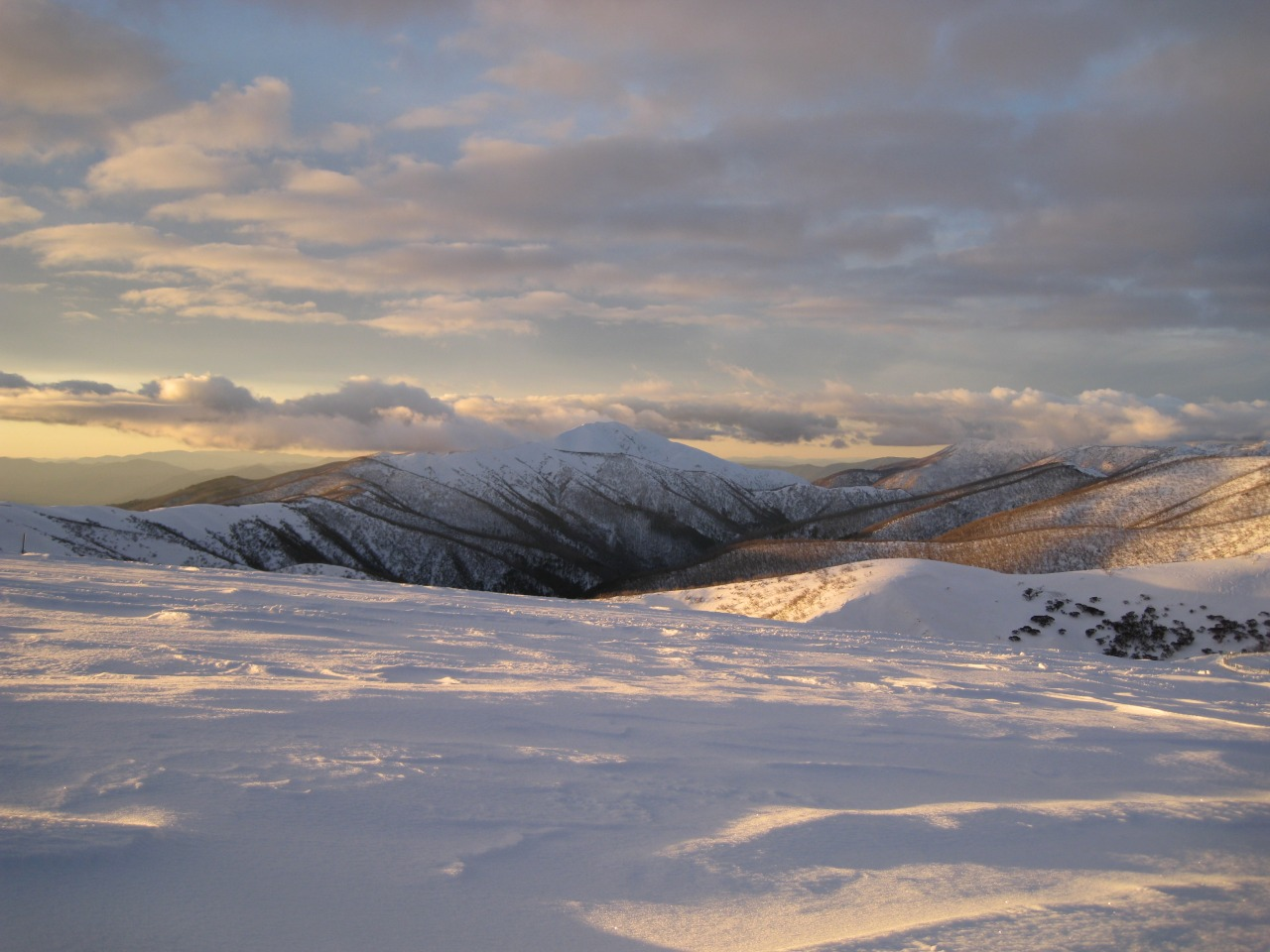
Mount Feathertop as seen from Mount Hotham

Ferdinand von Mueller achieved the first recorded ascent of Mount Feathertop. Unaware that the peak had already been named, he proposed that it might be named Mount La Trobe after Charles La Trobe who was Victoria's lieutenant-governor at the time. Members of the Bright Alpine Club made the first winter ascent in September 1889.

A track from Harrietville was cut in 1906 along a similar route to the current Bungalow Spur track, and a rough shelter was built near a spring on a flat area below the treeline. The shelter was replaced by Feathertop Hut in 1912.

In 1925, the Feathertop Bungalow was built, with materials and prefabricated sections transported by packhorse and sled. It had 24 guest beds and provided commercial accommodation on the mountain before being destroyed in the Black Friday bushfire of 1939.

== Vegetation ==
Forests of mountain ash cover the lower slopes of Mount Feathertop up to an altitude of about 1,000 metres (3,300 ft) where snow gums begin to dominate. Above the treeline at around 1,700 metres (5,600 ft), vegetation consists of alpine shrubland and grassland.

== Access routes ==
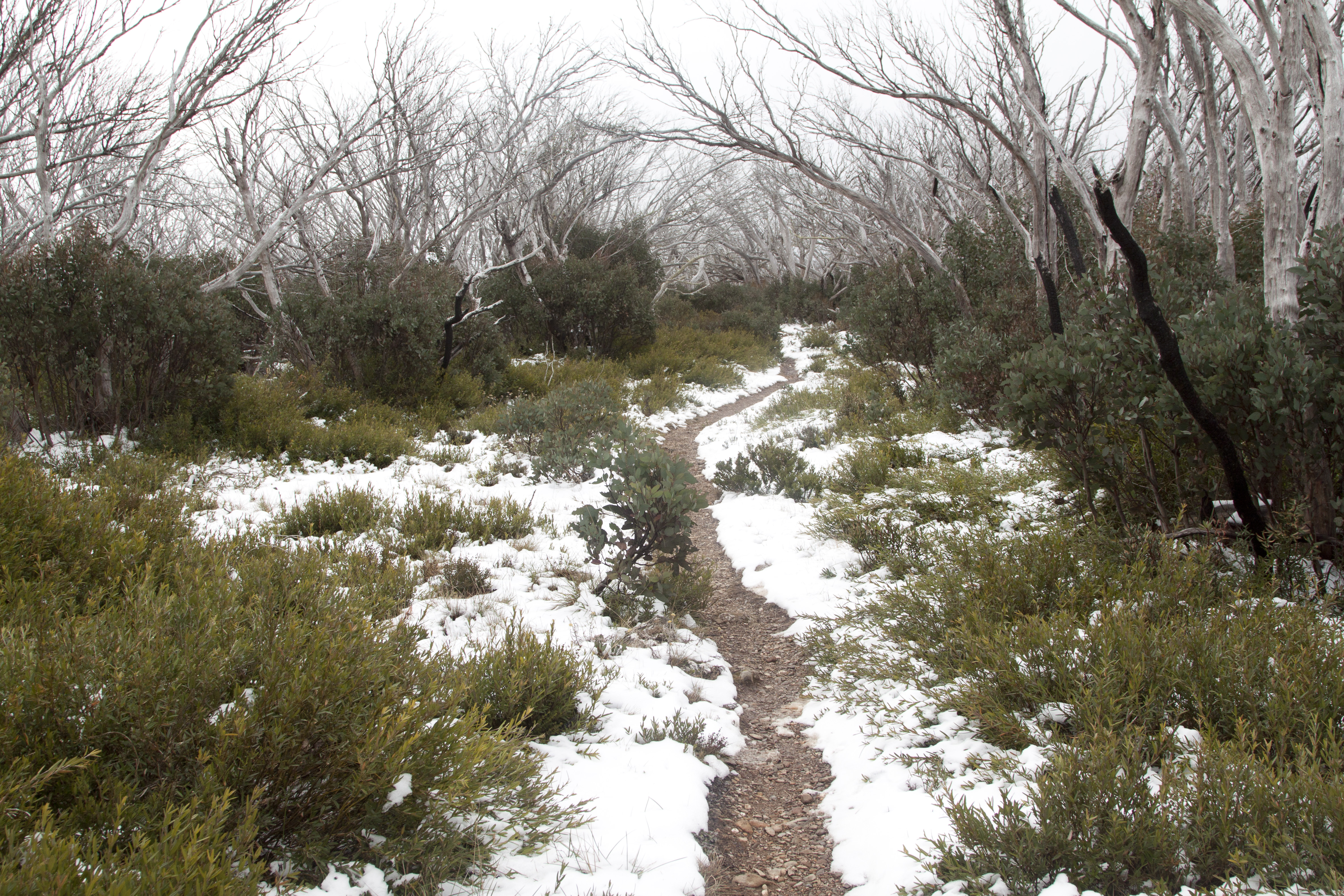
Snow on the Bungalow Spur track near Federation Hut

The main access routes on Mount Feathertop are the Razorback (north and south), Bon Accord Spur, Bungalow Spur, North-west Spur, and Diamantina Spur. Hiking on the East Ridge, North-east Spur, and Champion Spur has been possible at times after fires but the routes are now overgrown and rarely used.

The North Razorback track is the shortest and easiest route to Mount Feathertop, but it is along a ridgeline and can be very exposed during bad weather. It is possible to drive to within 4 kilometres (2.5 mi) of the summit during summer, but a winter road closure leaves a walk or ski of 7.3 kilometres (4.5 mi).

The South Razorback is a very popular walk in summer, and it is a spectacular ski tour in winter. It starts at Diamantina Hut on the Great Alpine Road near the Mount Hotham ski resort and is relatively flat but is also very exposed during bad weather. The South Razorback Track covers a distance of 11 kilometres (6.8 mi) from its start to the summit.

The Bon Accord Spur track starts in Harrietville and climbs up to the Razorback to join the South Razorback track near the Big Dipper, approximately 1.5 kilometres (0.93 mi) from Diamantina Hut.

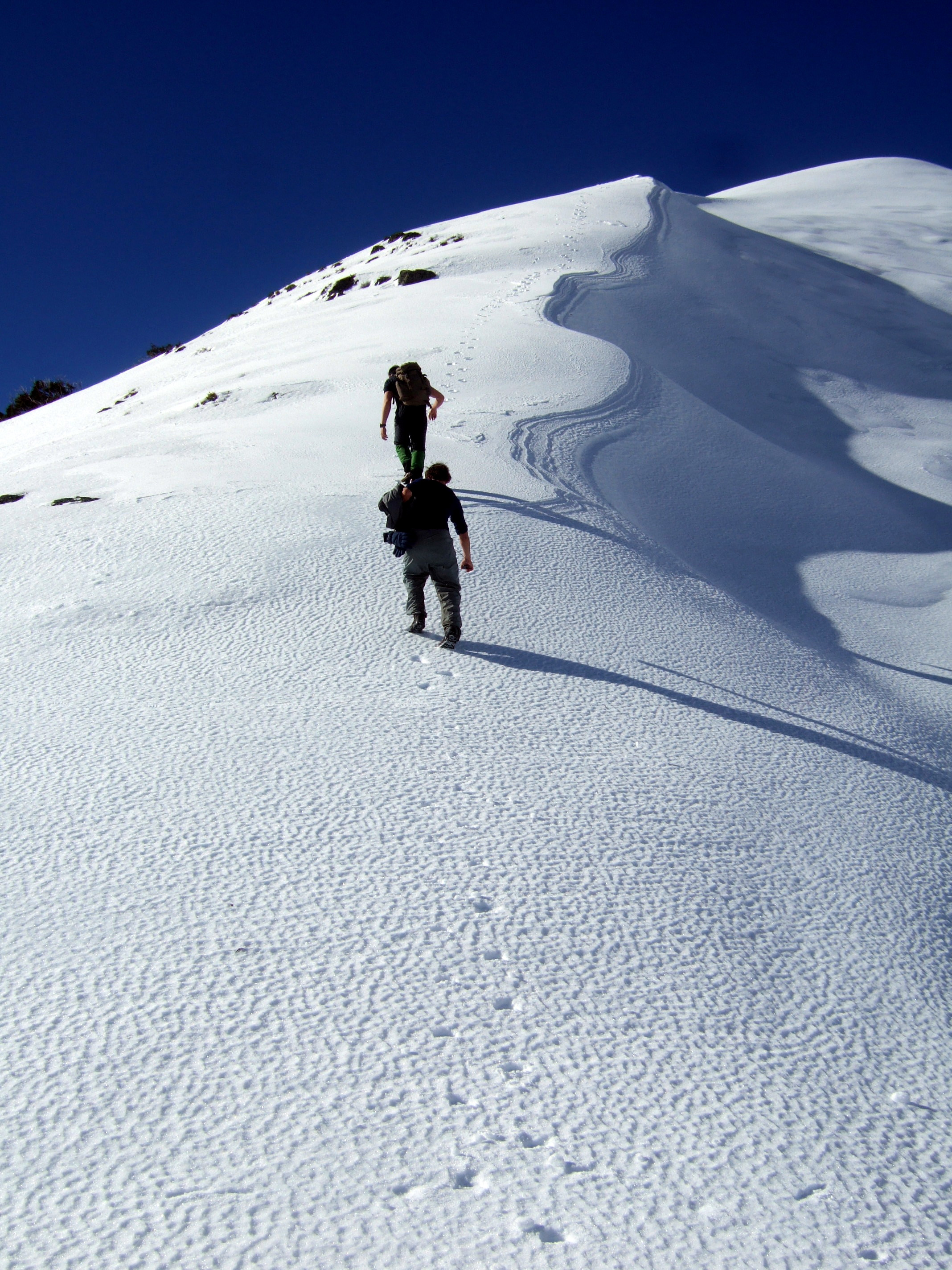
Ascending the peak from the MUMC hut

The Bungalow Spur track also starts near Harrietville at an elevation of 480 metres (1,570 ft). It was built for pack horses servicing the former Feathertop Bungalow and climbs gradually but continually for 9 kilometres (5.6 mi) until it reaches Federation Hut. The track then continues for another 2 kilometres (1.2 mi) until reaching the summit, joining the Razorback and North West Spur tracks along the way.

The Tom Kneen track along the North West Spur is a steep and hard climb starting near Stony Creek and reaching the Melbourne University Mountaineering Club hut after 7.5 kilometres (4.7 mi). From the hut, it continues across Feathertop's west face to join the track from Federation Hut to the summit. This route was named after a skier who died in an avalanche on Feathertop during 1985.

The Diamantina Spur track climbs from the Kiewa River West Branch for 4 kilometres (2.5 mi) before joining the South Razorback track about 3 kilometres (1.9 mi) from Mount Feathertop's summit. It offers great views of Mount Feathertop but climbs steeply (very in places) and involves some scrambling over loose shale.

== Mountain huts ==
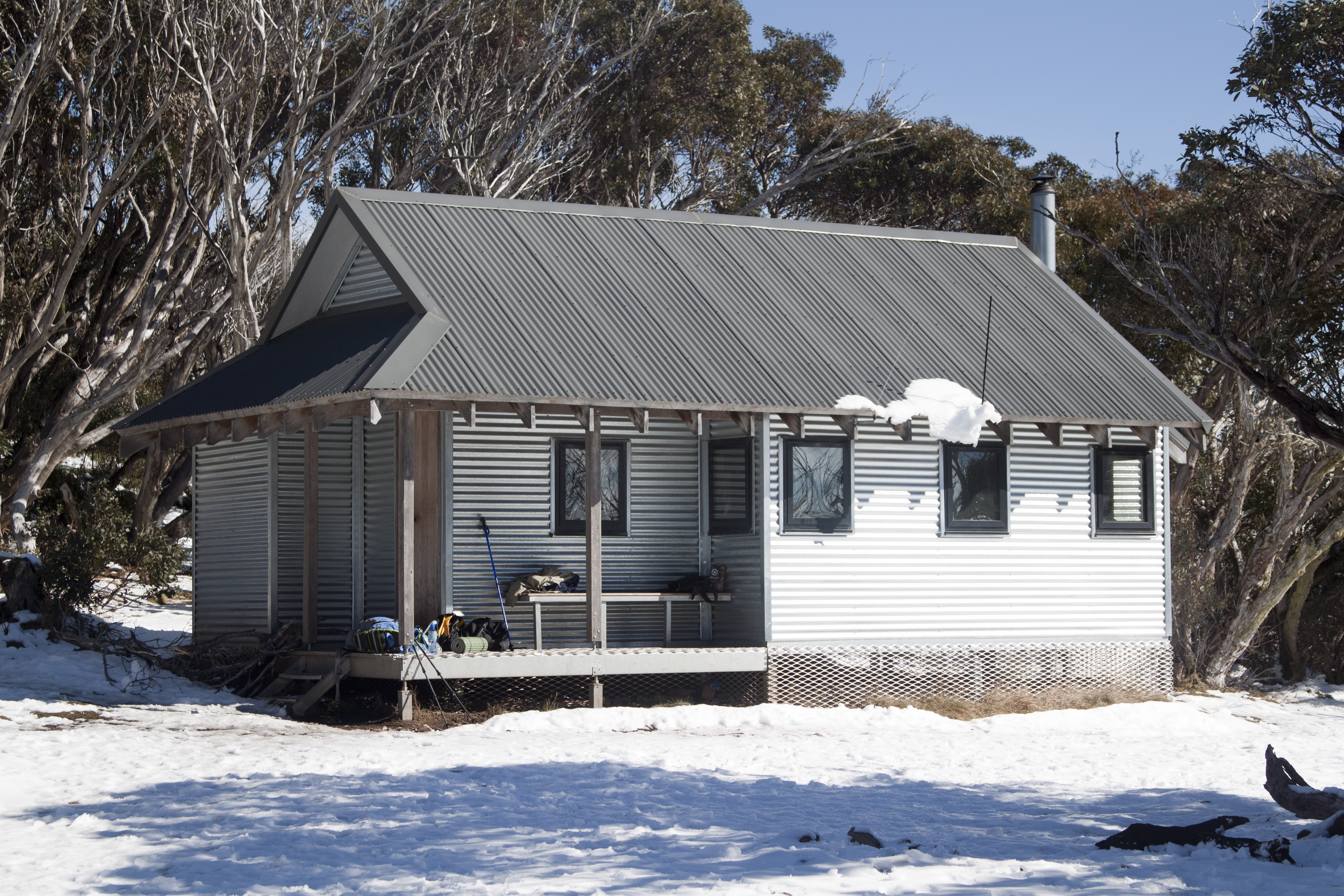
Federation Hut after an early May snowfall

There are two intact huts on the mountain and the ruins of several more.

In 1906, at the instigation of Jim Tobias and the Harrietville Progress Society, a rough track to the mountain from Harrietville was cut, running close to the present track up Bungalow Spur. A "shelter shed" was also built near a spring on a flat area below the treeline. In 1912 it was replaced by Feathertop Hut. The hut was mainly used as a base for summer excursions, but was occasionally used for climbing and snow walks. The hut survived the 1939 bushfires, but by the 1960s it was in poor condition. Federation Hut was built higher up the hill to replace it, and Feathertop Hut collapsed in the late 1970s.

The Feathertop Bungalow was built in 1925 and operated successfully as a 26-bed hotel for two years before problems with land tenure forced the owners to sell it to the railways at a knock-down price. After a few years of neglect, the railways realised its potential and operated it successfully for a decade before it burnt down in the Black Friday bushfires of 1939 and was never rebuilt. The site is visible on the Bungalow Spur track, but few signs of the Bungalow remain.

Razorback Hut was strategically placed halfway between Diamantina Hut and the Feathertop Bungalow. It appears to have been built after the First World War. It was a fairly basic refuge hut measuring 14' x 10' with a dirt floor and a single window. It was burnt in the 1939 bushfires and never replaced

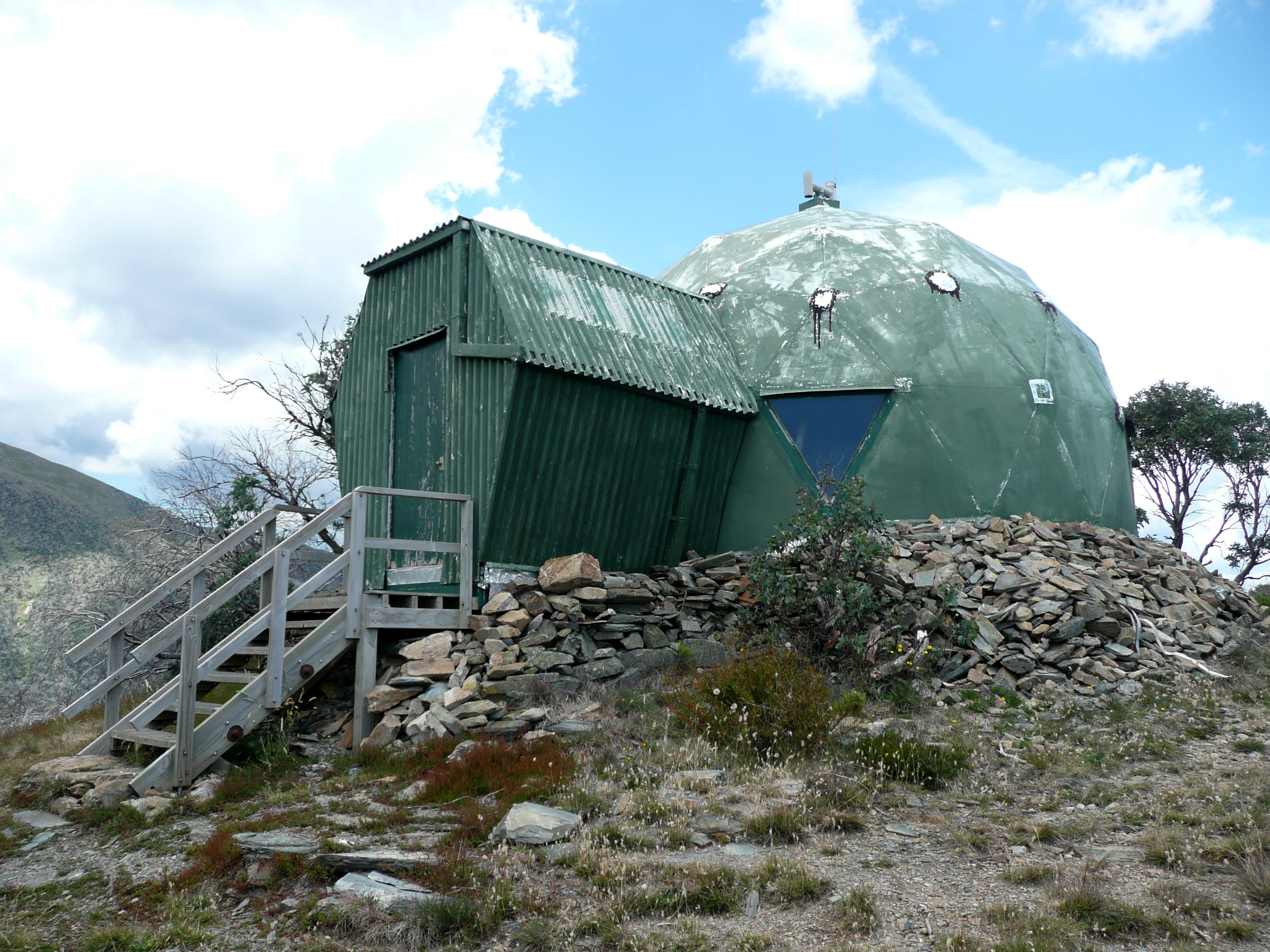
MUMC hut on Mount Feathertop

In 1966, the Melbourne University Mountaineering Club built a large hut at the top of the North-West Spur to serve as a base for winter alpine activities in memory of two club members who had died in a climbing accident in New Zealand. The hut was designed by Peter Kneen, a final-year civil engineering student at Melbourne University. It is a geodesic dome clad with aluminium sheeting and includes a spacious upstairs sleeping area. Materials were carried to the site from the roadhead on the North Razorback track. The silver aluminium cladding was painted its current drab green in March 1977.

Federation Hut was originally built in 1968-69 by the Federation of Victorian Walking Clubs and is situated on the treeline at the top of Bungalow Spur near Little Feathertop. The hut was renovated and reclad in timber by Ian Stapleton in 1988, and destroyed by the 2003 Eastern Victorian alpine bushfires before being rebuilt in 2005 by Parks Victoria.

== Accidents ==
Victorian government minister Tim Holding disappeared on the mountain on 31 August 2009 when he failed to return from his solo hiking journey. Sixty searchers were deployed in the field by Monday evening, 31 August 2009, including Victorian Police Search and Rescue, Mount Hotham Ski Patrol, Bush Search and Rescue and the State Emergency Service. He was found during the morning on Tuesday 1 September, one day after searchers were deployed on Monday. Uninjured, he reported that he had lost his footing on an icy slope and slid down into a gully. Disoriented and with poor visibility, he waited for rescue, using a reflective space blanket to attract attention.

Graeme Nelson, a 56-year-old doctor from Eden in south-eastern New South Wales, a longtime regular visitor of the mountain, died on 24 August 2011 while skiing with friends in Avalanche Gully on Mount Feathertop. Nelson is believed to have slipped in icy conditions and fell 700 metres down an icy slope, dying before his skiing companions could climb down to reach him.

Tom Kneen, cousin of Peter Kneen who designed the MUMC Hut, died in August 1985 when he and three companions strayed onto the snow cornice in a whiteout near the summit.

Steven Galland died on Feathertop in 1983 when he fell whilst digging a snow cave on an MUMC trip.

James Flitcroft was a European traveller who decided to climb Mount Feathertop in September 1996 but died from dehydration, having forgotten to pack some water.

South of the summit pyramid at the start of the Razorback there is a hill with a small cairn and a plaque in remembrance of Molly Hill, who may have been the first skier to die in Victoria. Mary (Molly) Ann Hill was with a group from the Ski Club of Victoria that was stuck at the Feathertop Bungalow during six days of poor weather. On Friday 2 September 1932 a group of six set out for Hotham Heights. After they climbed to the Razorback, Hill slipped on a steep patch of ice and slid over 60 metres down a steep slope before hitting a tree. A rescue party was quickly organised and she was stretchered to Harrietville from where she was driven to hospital in Bright. Hill died of head injuries later that night and was buried in the Cheltenham Pioneer Cemetery.

== Gallery ==
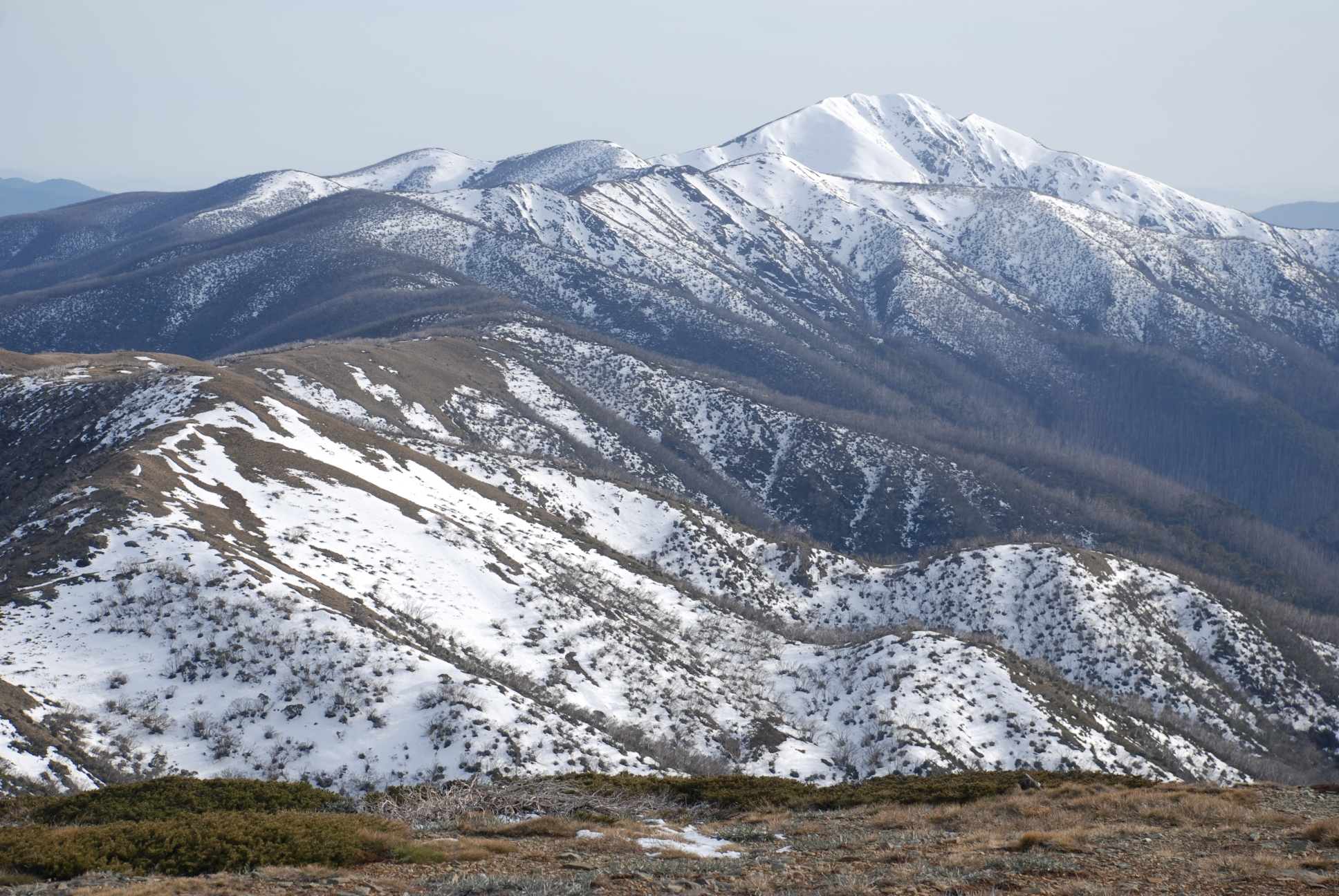
Mount Feathertop and Razorback during the spring melt

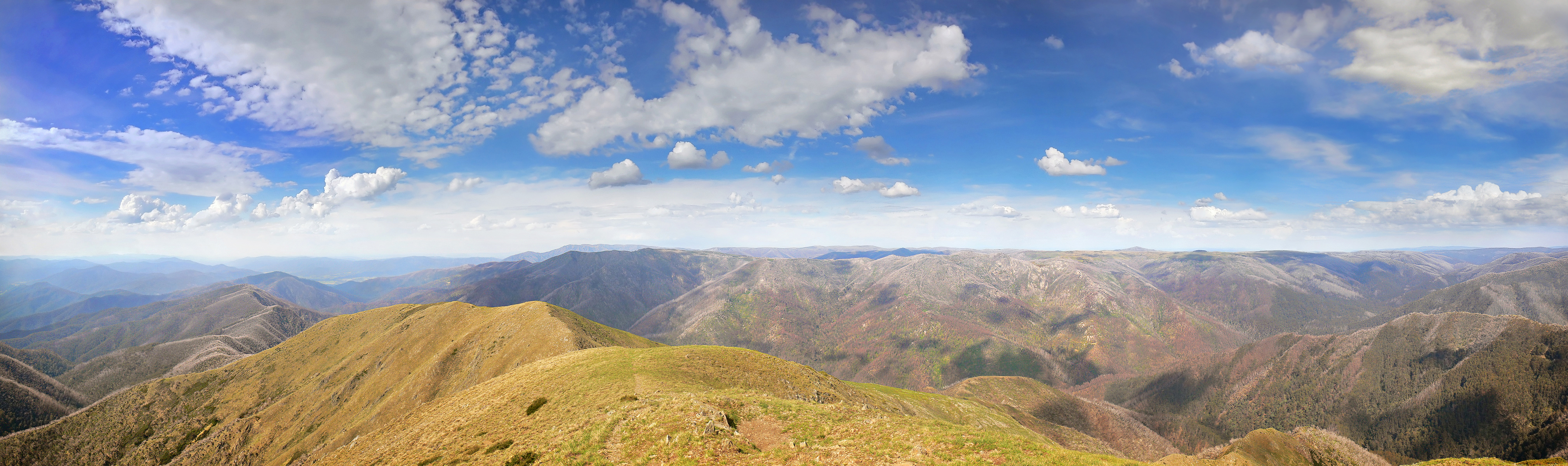
Easterly view from the peak in late spring

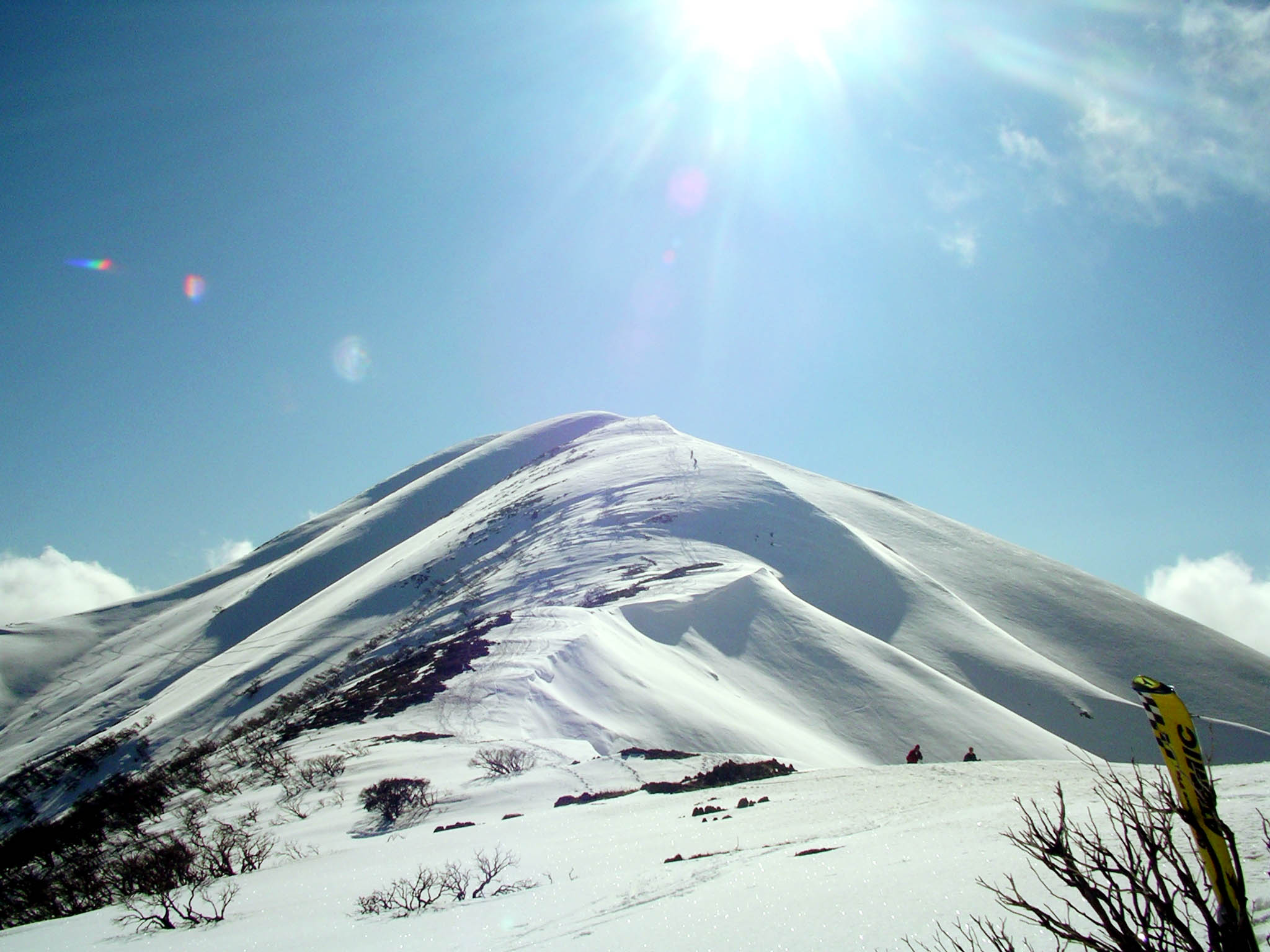
Mount Feathertop as seen from the saddle to the south in early spring

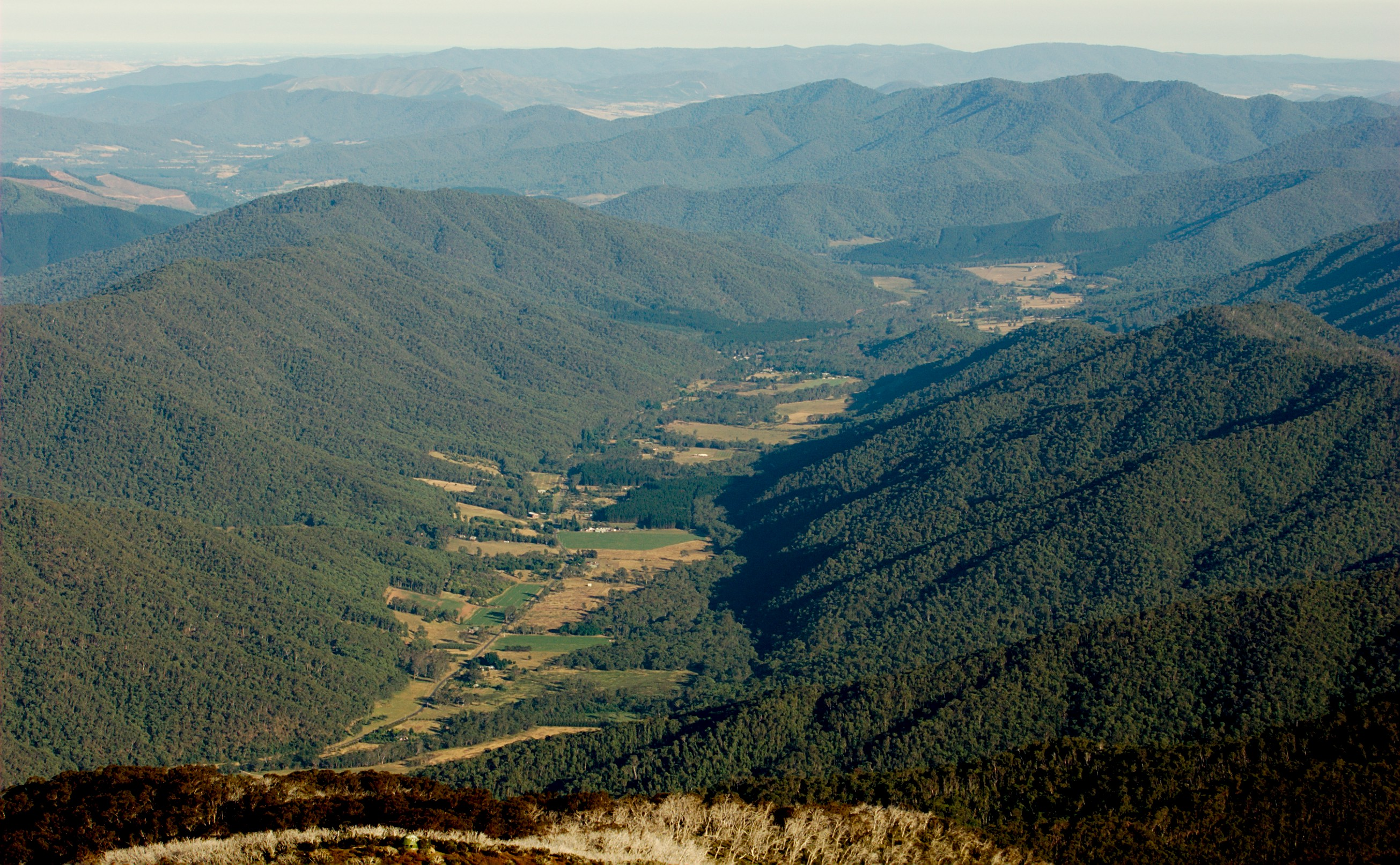
View from the summit of the Ovens Valley and MUMC hut (extreme bottom of frame)

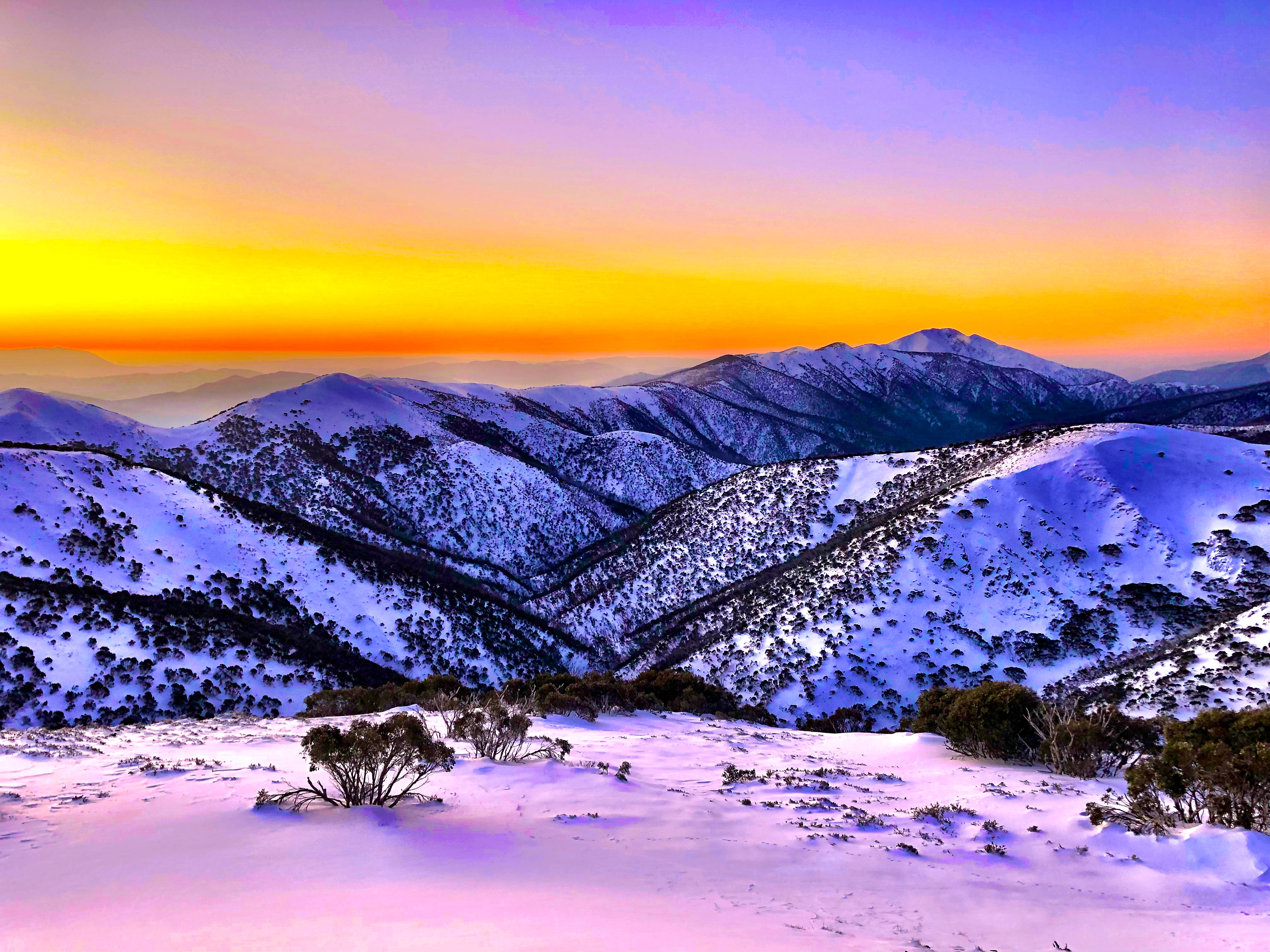
Mount Feathertop as seen from Mount Hotham

== See also ==
- Alpine National Park
- List of mountains in Australia § Victoria
