= Great Dividing Range =

Mountain range in Australia

- Eastern Highlands; Great Divide
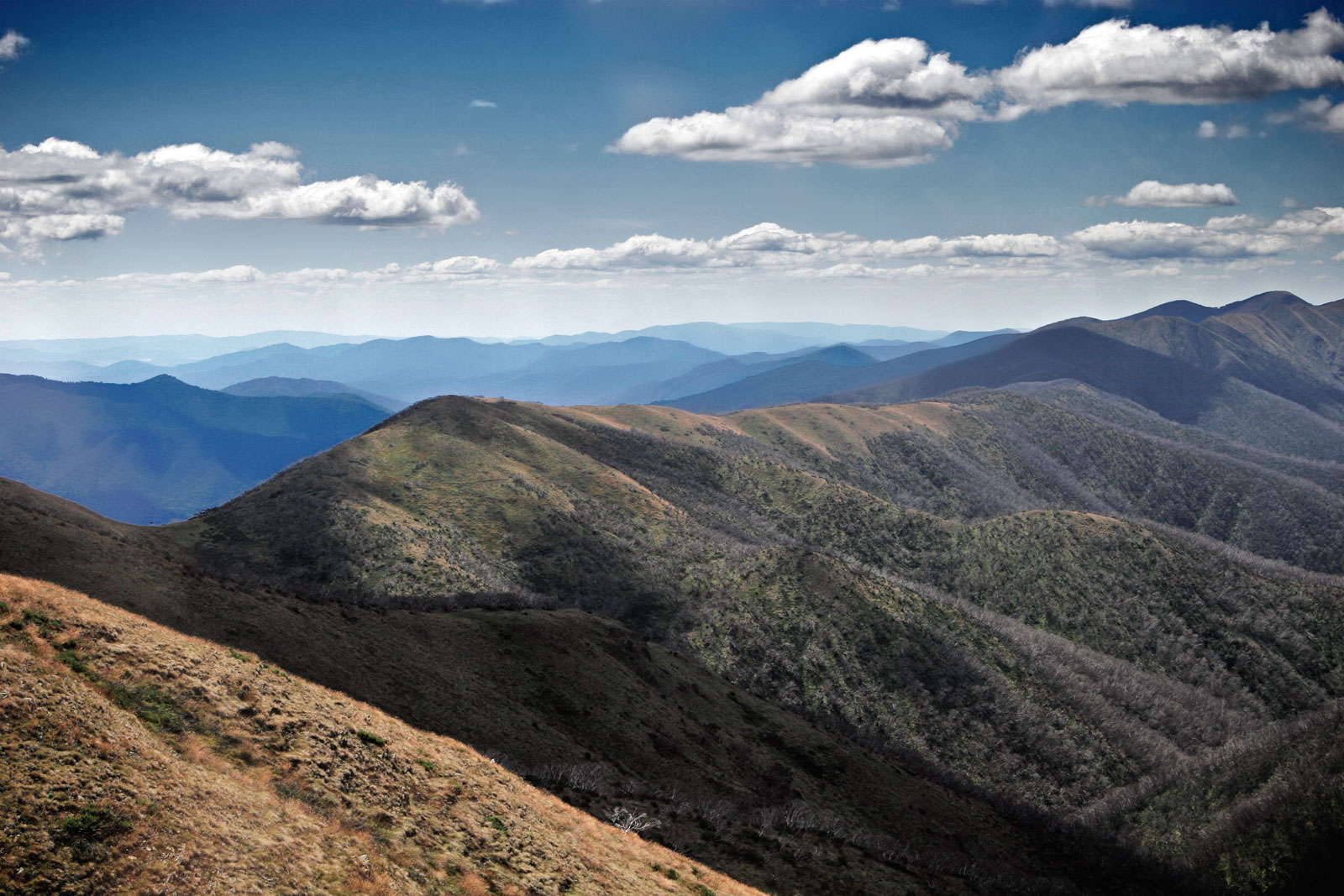
- Great Dividing Range

Highest point
- Peak: Mount Kosciuszko, Snowy Mountains
- Elevation: 2,228 m (7,310 ft)
- Coordinates: 36°27′21″S 148°15′49″E

Dimensions
- Length: 3,500 km (2,200 mi) North–South

Geography
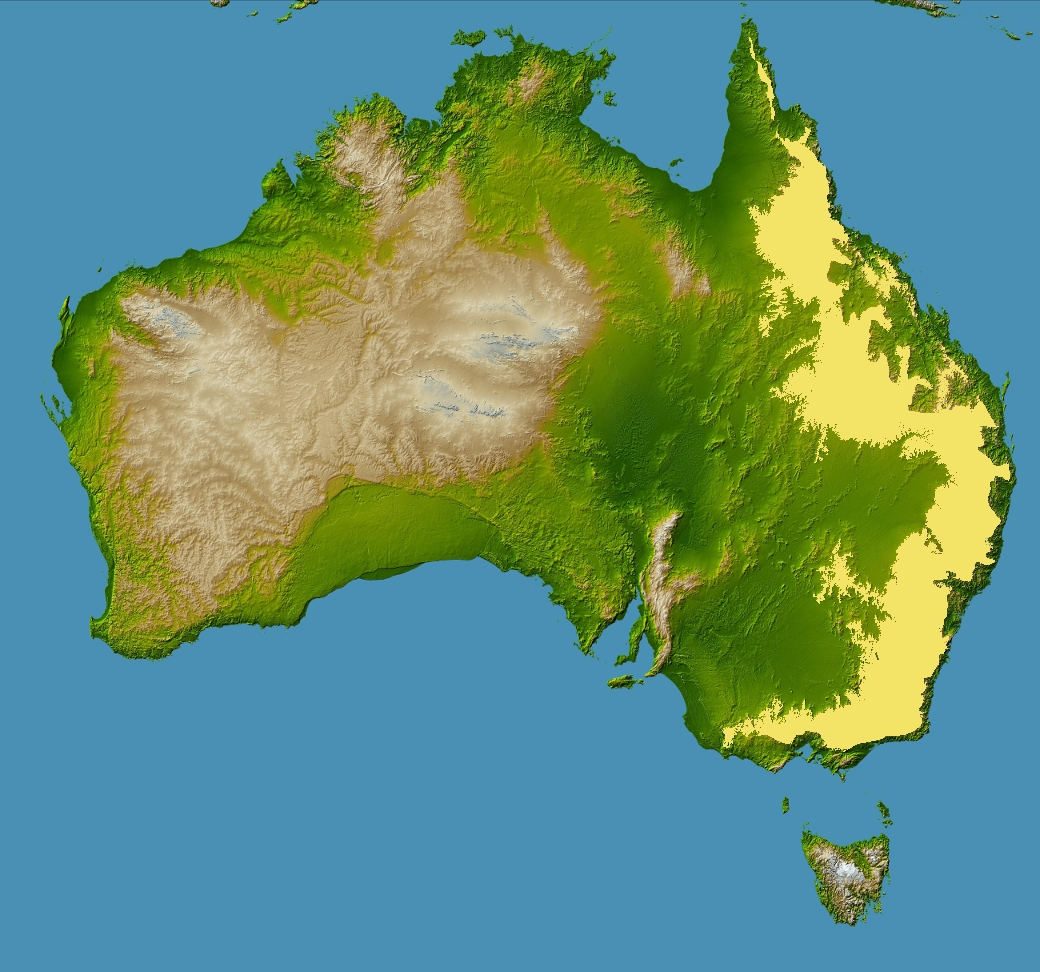
- The Great Dividing Range consists of a complex of mountain ranges, plateaus, upland areas and escarpments.
- Country: Australia
- States/Districts: New South Wales; Queensland; Victoria; Australian Capital Territory
- Range coordinates: 25°S 147°E

Geology
- Rock age: Carboniferous

The Great Dividing Range, also known as the East Australian Cordillera or the Eastern Highlands, is a cordillera system in eastern Australia consisting of an expansive collection of mountain ranges, plateaus and rolling hills. It runs roughly parallel to the east coast of Australia and forms the fifth-longest land-based mountain chain in the world, and the longest entirely within a single country. It is mainland Australia's most substantial topographic feature and serves as the definitive watershed for the river systems in eastern Australia, hence its name.

The Great Dividing Range stretches more than 3,500 kilometres (2,175 mi) from Dauan Island in the Torres Strait off the northern tip of Cape York Peninsula, running the entire length of the eastern coastline through Queensland and New South Wales, then turning west across Victoria before finally fading into the Wimmera plains as rolling hills west of the Grampians region. The width of the Range varies from about 160 km (100 mi) to over 300 km (190 mi). The Greater Blue Mountains Area, Gondwana Rainforests and Wet Tropics of Queensland World Heritage Areas are located in the Range. The highest place in Australia, the 2,228 m (7,310 ft) Mount Kosciuszko, resides in the Snowy Mountains portion of southern Great Dividing Range.

== Geography ==
The Dividing Range does not consist of a single continuous mountain chain, but is rather a combined complex (cordillera) of mountain ranges, plateaus, hilly upland areas and escarpments with an ancient and complex geological history. The physiographic division name for the landmass is called the East Australian Cordillera. In some places the terrain is relatively flat, consisting of very low hills. Typically the highlands range from 300 to 1,600 metres (980 to 5,250 ft) in height. The mountains and plateaus, which consist of limestones, sandstone, quartzite, schists and dolomite, have been created by faulting and folding processes.

The crest of the Great Dividing Range is defined by the watershed boundary between the drainage basins of river systems east (the coastal or rainward side) and west (the inland or leeward side) of it. The higher and more rugged parts of the "range" do not necessarily form part of the crest of the range, but may be branches and offshoots from it. The term "Great Dividing Range" may refer specifically to the watershed crest of the range, or to the entire upland complex including all of the hills and mountains between the east coast of Australia and the central plains and lowlands. At some places it can be up to 400 km (249 mi) wide. Notable ranges and other features which form part of the range complex have their own distinctive names.

As a rule of thumb, rivers east/southeast of the Dividing Range drain directly eastward into the South Pacific and the Tasman Sea, or southward into the Bass Strait. Rivers west of the Dividing Range drain in various westerly directions according to latitudes: the Murray–Darling basin in southeastern Australia (Darling Downs/eastern South West Queensland, West/Central New South Wales, Northern Victoria and the Murraylands/Riverland region of southeastern South Australia) drain southwestwards into the Great Australian Bight via the coastal Lake Alexandrina; the eastern half of the Lake Eyre basin in east central Australia (the Cooper Creek and Warburton River systems in Central/western South West Queensland and eastern Far North of South Australia) drain southwestwards into the endorheic Kati Thanda–Lake Eyre; the numerous rivers of western Cape York Peninsula in northeastern Australia (North/Far North Queensland) drain westwards or northwestwards directly into the Gulf of Carpentaria.

== Climate ==
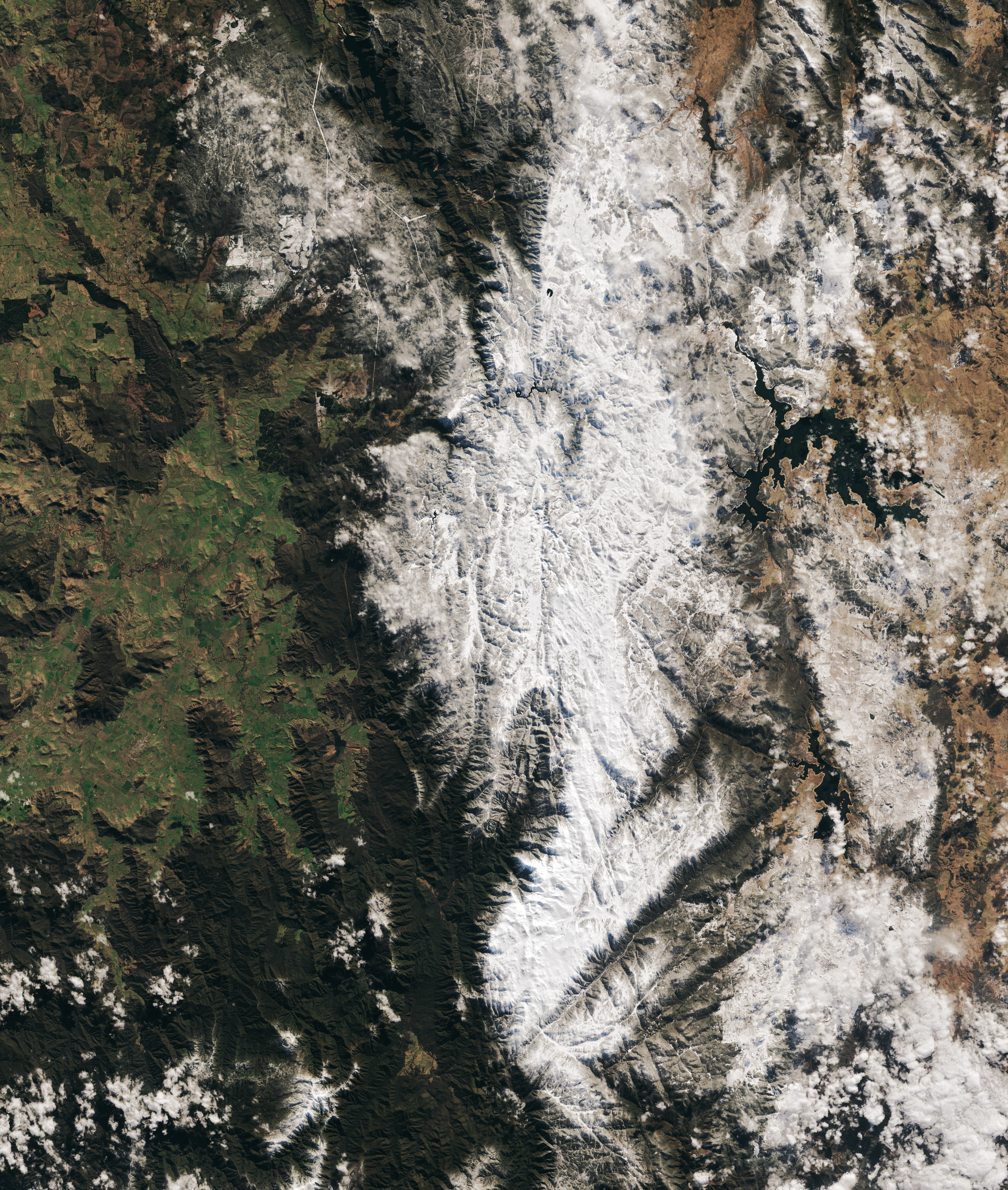
The Monaro Plains (right) are drier than the verdant western upslopes (left) as they lie in a rain shadow. (View of the Snowy Mountains region)

The sharp rise between the coastal lowlands and the eastern uplands has affected Australia's climate, mainly due to orographic precipitation, and these areas of highest relief have revealed an impressive gorge country. Areas to the east of the mountain range in southern NSW usually experience a Föhn effect, which is a dry wind originating from the Great Dividing Range that abruptly raises the air temperature in the lee of that mountain range and reduces atmospheric moisture. This dry wind, which elevates fire danger in the warm months, occurs because of the partial orographic obstruction of relatively damp low-level air and the subsiding of drier upper-level air in leeward of the mountains. The drier air is then heated more because of the adiabatic compression as it comes down the lee slopes, forming a rain shadow.

In the cool season, the Great Dividing Range would shield much of the southeast (i.e. Sydney, Central Coast, Hunter Valley, Illawarra, the ACT, the Monaro and South Coast) from south-westerly cold fronts that originate from the Southern Ocean, which bring chilling rains, sleet and snow to the upwind side of the ranges, such as on the western Central Tablelands, South West Slopes and Snowy Mountains regions – all which have relatively wetter winters. Upwind locations include Crookwell, Batlow, Tumut, Corryong, Bright, Beechworth, Eildon, Tolmie and those in West Gippsland (namely the Latrobe Valley and Wilsons Promontory). Whereas on the downwind (eastern) slopes, Cooma, Omeo, Goulburn, Bowral, Bombala, Nimmitabel, and Canberra, are warmer and drier relative to altitude.

Moreover, Oberon, Shooters Hill and Sunny Corner are on the crest of the ranges and thus exposed from all directions, hence their evenly spread rainfall. The main ski resorts in New South Wales, such as Thredbo Village, Perisher and Charlotte Pass, lie transitionally between the leeward and windward side (the former town being more leeward and the latter more windward). Although they receive substantial precipitation from over the crest of the ranges, they lack the persistent cloud cover which characterises truly windward locations on the western face, which are; Cabramurra, Kiandra, Mount Buller, Falls Creek, Mount Hotham, Mount Buffalo and Mount Baw Baw.

== History ==
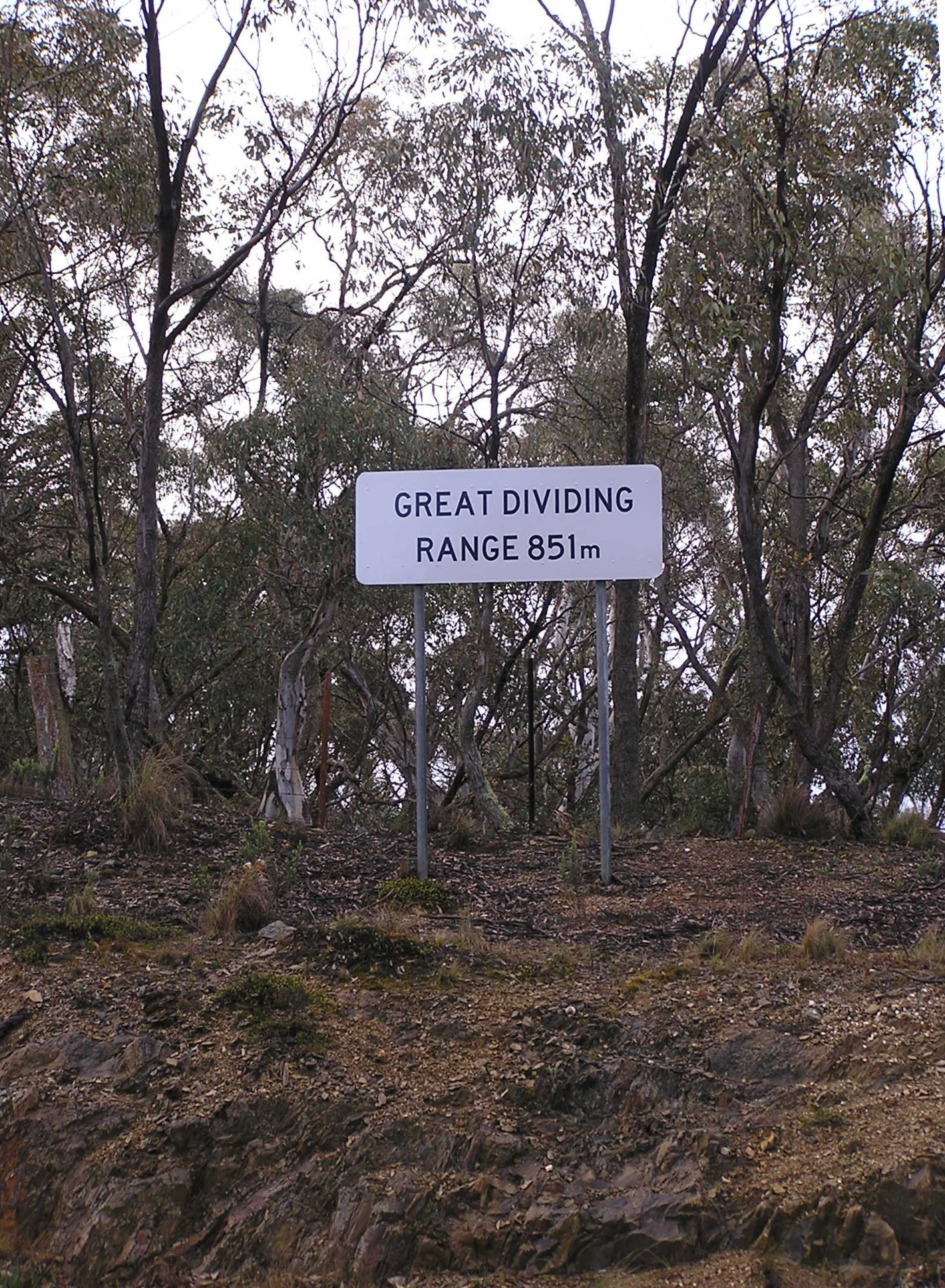
Great Dividing Range sign on the Kings Highway between Braidwood and Bungendore, New South Wales

The Great Dividing Range was formed during the Carboniferous period—over 300 million years ago—when Australia collided with what are now parts of South America and New Zealand. The range has experienced significant erosion since. (See Geology of Australia.)

For tens of thousands of years prior to British colonisation the ranges were home to various Aboriginal Australian peoples. Evidence remains in some places of their traditional way of life including decorated caves, campsites and trails used to travel between the coastal and inland regions. Many descendants of these early inhabitants still exist today, and some remain the traditional owners and custodians of their lands.

After British colonisation in 1788, the ranges were an obstacle to exploration and settlement by European settlers. Although not high, parts of the highlands were very rugged. Crossing the Blue Mountains was particularly challenging due to the mistaken idea that the creeks should be followed rather than the ridges, and almost impenetrable, labyrinthine, sandstone mountains. The Blue Mountains actually lie to the east of the watershed that divides the Hawkesbury–Nepean system and the Murray–Darling system, the true Great Dividing Range. The watershed in this area lies to the west of Lithgow, passing near the locality of Mt Lambie and village of Capertee. There, as in some other places in New South Wales, the Great Divide is only a slight rise in the surrounding topography.

Knowing that local Aboriginal people had already established routes crossing the range and by making use of Aboriginal walking trails, a usable ridge-top route was discovered by Europeans directly westward from Sydney across the Blue Mountains to Bathurst by an expedition jointly led by Gregory Blaxland, William Lawson and William Charles Wentworth. Towns in the Blue Mountains were later named after each of these men. This was the start of the development of the agricultural districts of inland New South Wales. A road was built to Bathurst by convicts within six months. Easier routes to inland New South Wales were discovered towards Goulburn to the southwest, and westwards from Newcastle.

Subsequent explorations were made across and around the ranges by Allan Cunningham, John Oxley, Hamilton Hume, Paul Edmund Strzelecki, Ludwig Leichhardt and Thomas Mitchell. These explorers were mainly concerned with finding and appropriating good agricultural land.

By the late 1830s, the most fertile rangelands adjacent to the mountain ranges had been explored, appropriated from the traditional inhabitants and some settled. These included the Gippsland and Riverina regions in the south, up to the Liverpool Plains and the Darling Downs in the north.

Various road and railway routes were subsequently established through many parts of the ranges, although many areas remain remote to this day. For example, in eastern Victoria there is only one major road crossing the highlands from north to south, the Great Alpine Road.

== Natural components ==
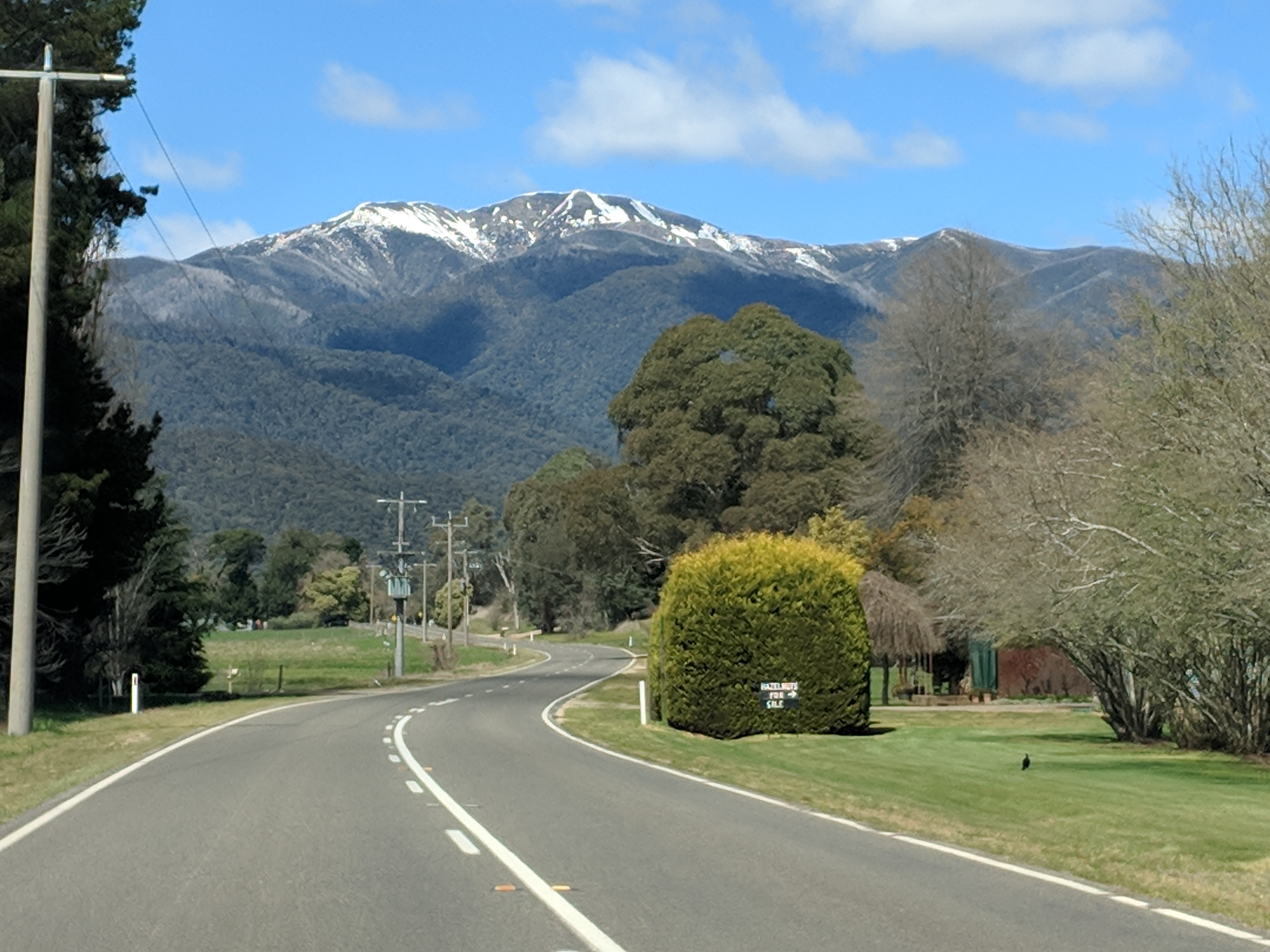
Mt Feathertop viewed from Smoko

Parts of the highlands consisting of relatively flat and, by Australian standards, well-watered land were developed for agricultural and pastoral uses. Such areas include the Atherton Tableland and Darling Downs in Queensland, and the Northern Tablelands, Southern Highlands and Southern Tablelands in New South Wales. Other parts of the highlands are too rugged for agriculture and have been used for forestry. Many parts of the highlands which were not developed are now included in National Parks.

All of mainland Australia's alpine areas, including its highest mountain, Mount Kosciuszko (2,228 metres or 7,310 feet AHD), are part of this range, called the Main Range. The highest areas in southern New South Wales and eastern Victoria are known as the Australian Alps.

The central core of the Great Dividing Range is dotted with hundreds of peaks and is surrounded by many smaller mountain ranges or spurs, canyons, valleys and plains of regional significance. Some of the major plains include the High Plains of South-Eastern Australia, the Southern Highlands, the Central Highlands and Bogong High Plains of Victoria. Other tablelands considered part of the Great Dividing Range are the Atherton Tableland, Canberra wine region and the Southern Tablelands.

The Dandenong Ranges, Barrington Tops, Bunya Mountains, Blue Mountains, Liverpool Range, McPherson Ranges and the Moonbi Range are some of the smaller spurs and ranges that make up the greater dividing range. Other notable ranges and tablelands which form part of the Great Dividing Range include the Liverpool Range, Mount Royal Range and the Monaro District. Whilst some of the peaks of the highlands reach heights of a little over 2,000 metres (6,600 ft), the age of the range and its erosion mean that most of the mountains are not very steep, and virtually all peaks can be reached without mountaineering equipment.

In some areas, such as the Snowy Mountains, Victorian Alps, the Scenic Rim and the eastern escarpments of the New England region, the highlands form a significant barrier. The eastern escarpment is the site of many spectacular waterfalls which were formed by rivers plunging off the tablelands. In other areas the slopes are gentle and in places the range is barely perceptible.

Well known passes on the range include Coxs Gap, Cunninghams Gap, Dead Horse Gap, Nowlands Gap, and Spicers Gap.

Major cities located on the upland areas of the range include Canberra, Toowoomba and the outer suburbs of Sydney, Melbourne, Brisbane, Gold Coast and Cairns in north Queensland. Many towns and cities are located on the range, and also in lowland areas and foothills adjacent to the highlands. There is a strong natural history and cultural attachment to the Dividing Range region in towns and on many, sometimes remote, landholdings. Some of the towns/cities located on or near the range include:

- Canberra – ACT
- Albury – NSW
- Queanbeyan – NSW
- Goulburn – NSW
- Cooma – NSW
- Jindabyne – NSW
- Katoomba – NSW
- Lithgow – NSW
- Oberon – NSW
- Bowral – NSW
- Yass – NSW
- Crookwell – NSW
- Cowra – NSW
- Young – NSW
- Bathurst – NSW
- Orange – NSW
- Wellington – NSW
- Blayney – NSW
- Mudgee – NSW
- Cessnock – NSW
- Wauchope – NSW
- Casino – NSW
- Grafton – NSW
- Inverell – NSW
- Glen Innes – NSW
- Gunnedah – NSW
- Singleton – NSW
- Armidale – NSW
- Tamworth – NSW
- Narrabri – NSW
- Coonabarabran – NSW
- Scone – NSW
- Gloucester – NSW
- Dorrigo – NSW
- Walcha – NSW
- Guyra – NSW
- Tenterfield – NSW
- Roma – Qld
- Gatton – Qld
- Dalby – Qld
- Goondiwindi – Qld
- Beaudesert – Qld
- Toowoomba – Qld
- Pittsworth – Qld
- Stanthorpe – Qld
- Warwick – Qld
- Kingaroy – Qld
- Biloela – Qld
- Emerald – Qld
- Moranbah – Qld
- Blackwater – Qld
- Clermont – Qld
- Charters Towers – Qld
- Atherton – Qld
- Mareeba – Qld
- Omeo – Vic
- Healesville – Vic
- Gisborne – Vic
- Ballarat – Vic
- Beaufort – Vic
- Bendigo – Vic
- Ararat – Vic
- Heathcote – Vic
- Stawell – Vic
- Seymour – Vic
- Benalla – Vic
- Castlemaine – Vic
- Kilmore – Vic
- Kyneton – Vic
- Maryborough – Vic
- Shepparton – Vic
- Wallan – Vic
- Wodonga – Vic
- Wangaratta – Vic

=== Water catchments ===
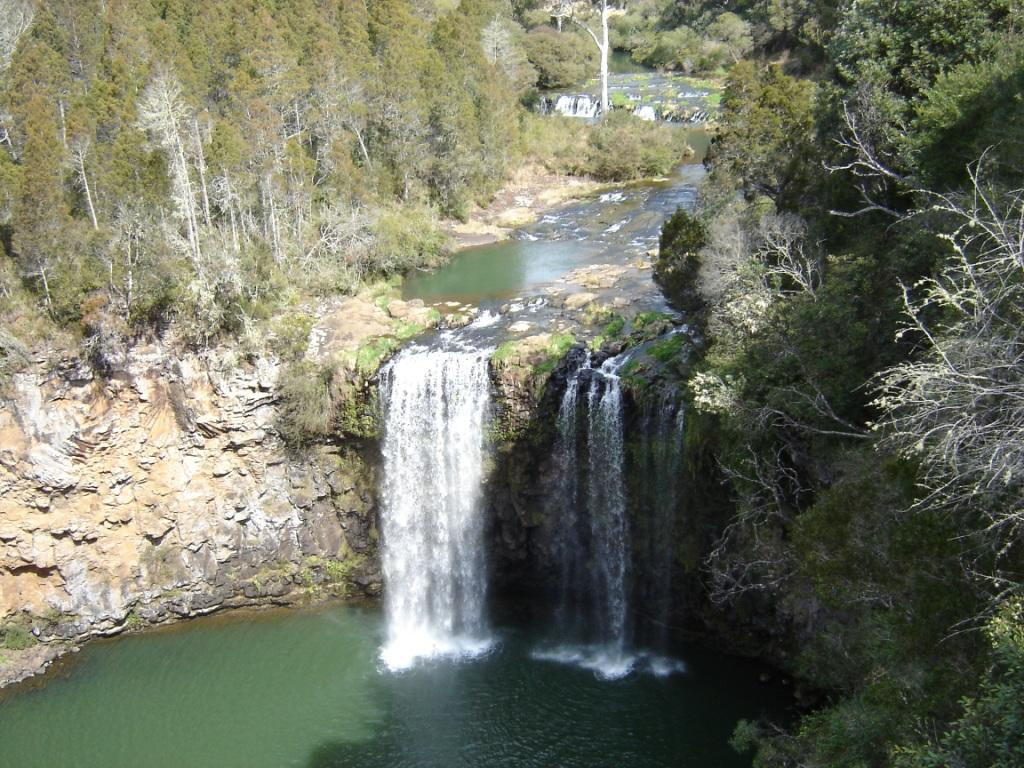
Some of the most spectacular waterfalls in Australia, such as Dangar Falls at Dorrigo, New South Wales, are located along the Great Dividing Range.

The lower reaches are used for forestry, an activity that causes friction with conservationists. The range is also the source of virtually all of eastern Australia's water supply, both through runoff caught in dams, and throughout much of Queensland, through the Great Artesian Basin.

Valleys along the chain of mountains have yielded a water source for important reservoirs and water supply projects such as the Upper Nepean Scheme, Snowy Mountains Scheme and Warragamba Dam.

The Bradfield Scheme has been mooted as a way to transport water from the Wet Tropics of Queensland in the coastal northeast of Far North Queensland via a series of Dams & Tunnels, southwest to inland dryer regions, including a tunnel through the Great Dividing Range into the Flinders River then a tunnel into the Torrens Creek in the White Mountains National Park then flows south into Thompson River / Cooper Creek, part of the Eyre Basin. Many other variations have been proposed.

The Great Dividing Range creates the drainage basins of the Australian south-east coast drainage division and the Australian north-east coast drainage division, whose water flows to the east coast and into the Pacific Ocean, Tasman Sea, and Bass Strait with the westerly Murray–Darling basin which flow inland, away from the coast into the interior plains.

Some of the rivers which flow west of the ranges includes the Condamine River, Flinders River, Herbert River, Lachlan River, Macdonald River, Macintyre River and Namoi River. Rivers that flow north into the Murray–Darling Basin from Victoria include the Goulburn, Mitta Mitta, Kiewa, Ovens, King, Loddon and Campaspe rivers. Rivers that flow east into the Pacific Ocean include the Annan River, Barron River, Brisbane River, Burdekin River, Burnett River, Clarence River, Daintree River, Fitzroy River, Hastings River, Hawkesbury River, Hunter River, Karuah River, Macleay River, Mary River, Pascoe River, Richmond River and the Shoalhaven River. Those that flow south, primarily through Victoria, include the Snowy, Cann, Tambo, Mitchell, Latrobe, Thomson, Yarra, Werribee, Hopkins and Glenelg rivers.

== Features ==
At some high hill passes the range provides cool sites appropriate for vineyards.

=== Railways ===
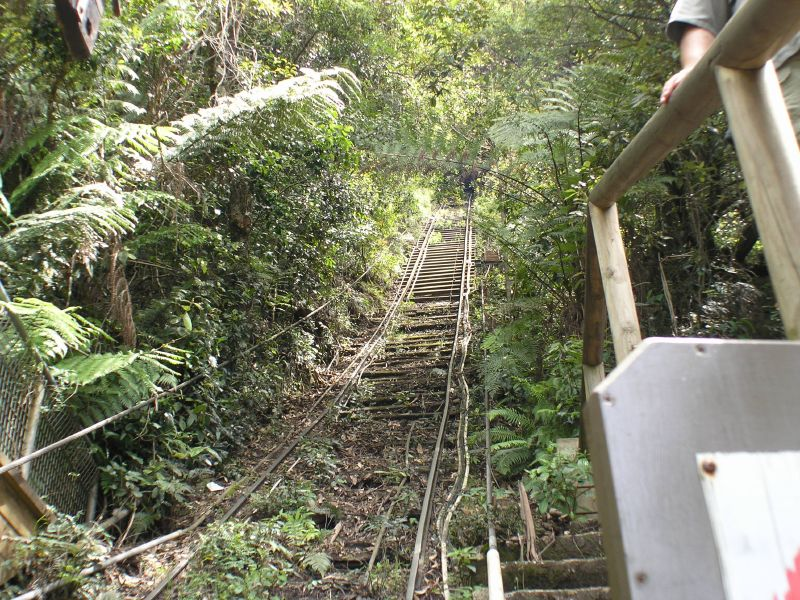
A number of scenic railways, such as this one at Scenic World, Katoomba, climb various shorter routes along the range

The engineers of early rail passages across the Great Dividing Range needed to find low sections of the range to cross, as well as suitable, "low" gradient paths up the mountains on either side. Rail passages include:

- Townsville–Mt Isa
- Rockhampton–Winton
- Brisbane–Toowoomba (1867) (2.0% gradient)
- Newcastle–Tamworth (c. 1870), summit at Ardglen Tunnel (2073' HASL)
- Sandy Hollow–Gulgong railway line started in the 1930s to Maryvale (Main Western railway line), completed the 1980s to Gulgong, summit just west of Ulan – (500M / 1640') The lowest, 4th & last crossing in NSW.
- Sydney–Lithgow (1869), crossing the range via the Blue Mountains (summit near Bell 3507' HASL) (3.00% gradient)
- Sydney–Goulburn (1869), though the divide is actually a few kilometres further west near the crossing with Parkesbourne Road near Cullerin. The next 300 km descending to Wagga Wagga was originally fast, but regrading in the 1920s introduced many curves.
- Melbourne–Seymour, crossing the range near Heathcote Junction (1872) (2.08% gradient)
- Melbourne–Bendigo, crossing the range near Woodend (1862) (1093' HASL)
- Melbourne–Ararat (1875) via Ballarat

=== Road transport ===
Many of Australia's highways such as the Alpine Way, Great Alpine Road, Snowy Mountains Highway, Hume Highway, Illawarra Highway, Northern Highway, Melba Highway, Maroondah Highway, Midland Highway, Pyrenees Highway, Sunraysia Highway, Monaro Highway, Olympic Highway, Newell Highway, Lachlan Valley Way, Barton Highway, Federal Highway, Kings Highway, Great Western Highway, Mitchell Highway, Mid-Western Highway, Castlereagh Highway, Mulligan Highway, Capricorn Highway, Cunningham Highway, Gore Highway, Flinders Highway, Gregory Highway, Peak Downs Highway, Dawson Highway, New England Highway, Golden Highway, Bruxner Highway, Gwydir Highway, Oxley Highway, Warrego Highway, Summerland Way, Waterfall Way, Thunderbolts Way, the Calder Highway, the Western Highway, and the Murray Valley Highway traverse parts of the range.

=== Protected areas ===
Much of the range lies within a succession of national parks and other reserves. Most of the national parks are listed below, and there are almost double that amount of state forests.

- Alpine National Park – Vic
- Annan River National Park – Qld
- Apudthama National Park – Qld
- Bago Bluff National Park – NSW
- Bald Rock National Park – NSW
- Barrington Tops National Park – NSW
- Baw Baw National Park – Vic
- Bellinger River National Park – NSW
- Blackbraes National Park – Qld
- Blackdown Tableland National Park – Qld
- Blue Mountains National Park – NSW
- Border Ranges National Park – NSW
- Brindabella National Park – NSW
- Brisbane Ranges National Park – Vic
- Budawang National Park – NSW
- Budderoo National Park – NSW
- Bunya Mountains National Park – Qld
- Burrowa-Pine Mountain National Park – Vic
- Cape Melville National Park – Qld
- Carnarvon National Park – Qld
- Cathedral Rock National Park – NSW
- Conimbla National Park – NSW
- Conondale National Park – Qld
- Cottan-Bimbang National Park – NSW
- Cunnawarra National Park – NSW
- Daintree National Park – Qld
- Dandenong Ranges National Park – Vic
- Deua National Park – NSW
- Dharug National Park – NSW
- Dipperu National Park – Qld
- Forty Mile Scrub National Park – Qld
- Gibraltar Range National Park – NSW
- Girraween National Park – Qld/NSW
- Girringun National Park – Qld
- Goobang National Park – NSW
- Goulburn River National Park – NSW
- Grampians National Park – Vic
- Greater Bendigo National Park – Vic
- Guy Fawkes River National Park – NSW
- Hann Tableland National Park – Qld
- Heathcote-Graytown National Park- Vic
- Humboldt National Park – Qld
- Kanangra-Boyd National Park – NSW
- Kara Kara National Park – Vic
- Koreelah National Park – NSW
- Kosciuszko National Park – NSW
- Kroombit Tops National Park – Qld
- Kulla National Park – Qld
- Kumbatine National Park – NSW
- Kuranda National Park – Qld
- Lake Eildon National Park – Vic
- Lamington National Park – Qld
- Lockyer National Park – Qld
- Macalister Range National Park – Qld
- Main Range National Park – Qld
- Morton National Park – NSW
- Mount Buffalo National Park – Vic
- Mount Kaputar National Park – NSW
- Mount Lewis National Park – Qld
- Mowbray National Park – Qld
- Mummel Gulf National Park – NSW
- Namadgi National Park – ACT
- Nattai National Park – NSW
- New England National Park – NSW
- Nowendoc National Park – NSW
- Nymboida National Park – NSW
- Oxley Wild Rivers National Park – NSW
- Oyala Thumotang National Park – Qld
- Paluma Range National Park – Qld
- Ravensbourne National Park – Qld
- Snowy River National Park – Vic
- South East Forests National Park – NSW
- Springbrook National Park – Qld
- Starcke National Park – Qld
- Sundown National Park – Qld
- Tapin Tops National Park – NSW
- Towarri National Park – NSW
- Toonumbar National Park – NSW
- Ulidarra National Park – NSW
- Undara Volcanic National Park – Qld
- Wadbilliga National Park – NSW
- Warrabah National Park – NSW
- Warrumbungle National Park – NSW
- Washpool National Park – NSW
- Werrikimbe National Park – NSW
- White Mountains National Park – Qld
- Willi Willi National Park – NSW
- Woko National Park – NSW
- Wollemi National Park – NSW
- Wollumbin National Park – NSW
- Woomargama National Park – NSW
- Wooroonooran National Park – Qld
- Yarra Ranges National Park – Vic
- Yengo National Park – NSW

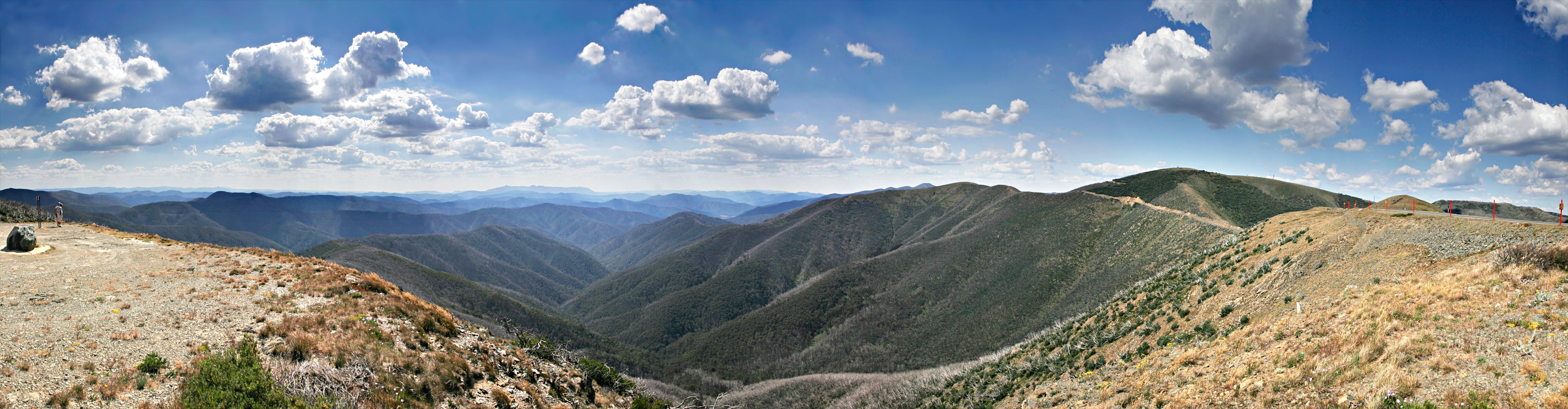
The Great Dividing Range, as seen from near Mount Hotham, Victoria

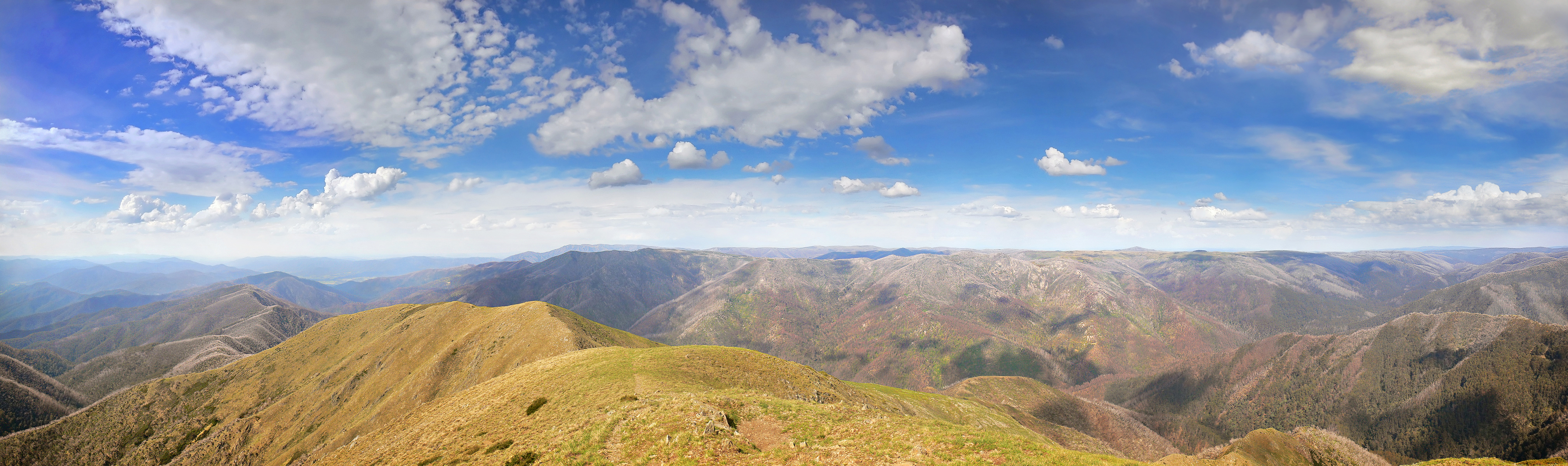
View from the peak of Mount Feathertop, facing north-east, showing the Fainters and other mountains

== Awards ==
In 2009 as part of the Q150 celebrations, the Great Dividing Range was announced as one of the Q150 Icons of Queensland for its role as a "location".

== See also ==
- List of mountain ranges
- List of mountains in Australia
- Great Escarpment, Australia
- Hume's Pass, a low pass on the Great Dividing Range
