= High Plains (Australia) =

Sub-region adjacent to the Great Dividing Range, Australia

The High Plains of south-eastern Australia are a sub-region, or more strictly a string of adjacent areas, in and adjacent to the Australian Alps, part of the Great Dividing Range. They were long used for summer grazing, in some cases since the 1830s. Much of the sub-region is now national parks.

== Location and features ==
Consisting of a weathered plateau divided by deep gorges, the High Plains region provided natural paddocks. The higher areas were natural grassed pastures, and lower areas were cleared of the native forest by settlers, some of whom had grazing licenses while others were merely squatters. Fences were necessary only for stockyards, as during summer the cattle had no incentive to wander into the forests or down the steep gorges. However it was essential to muster the cattle in autumn before colder weather, and even snowfalls, drove them down into the gorges. If this happened because of unseasonably early snow, or other factors, the cattle might be lost or might go feral.

== European history ==
Droving cattle to and from these summer pastures (a practice known as yaylag pastoralism) presented enormous challenges of horsemanship. In this part of the world, the easiest trails normally follow the ridges, not the valleys. Attempts by early explorers to follow the valleys ended in sheer cliffs. However, persuading cattle to climb a narrow spur in order to follow a ridge route required skill and courage. Such routes were also unsuitable for all but the strongest wheeled vehicles, and slow and risky even for bullock drays, so pack horses were the more common way of transporting freight.

Some of Australia's favourite stories and poems originated in this area, notably "The Man from Snowy River" by Banjo Paterson.
