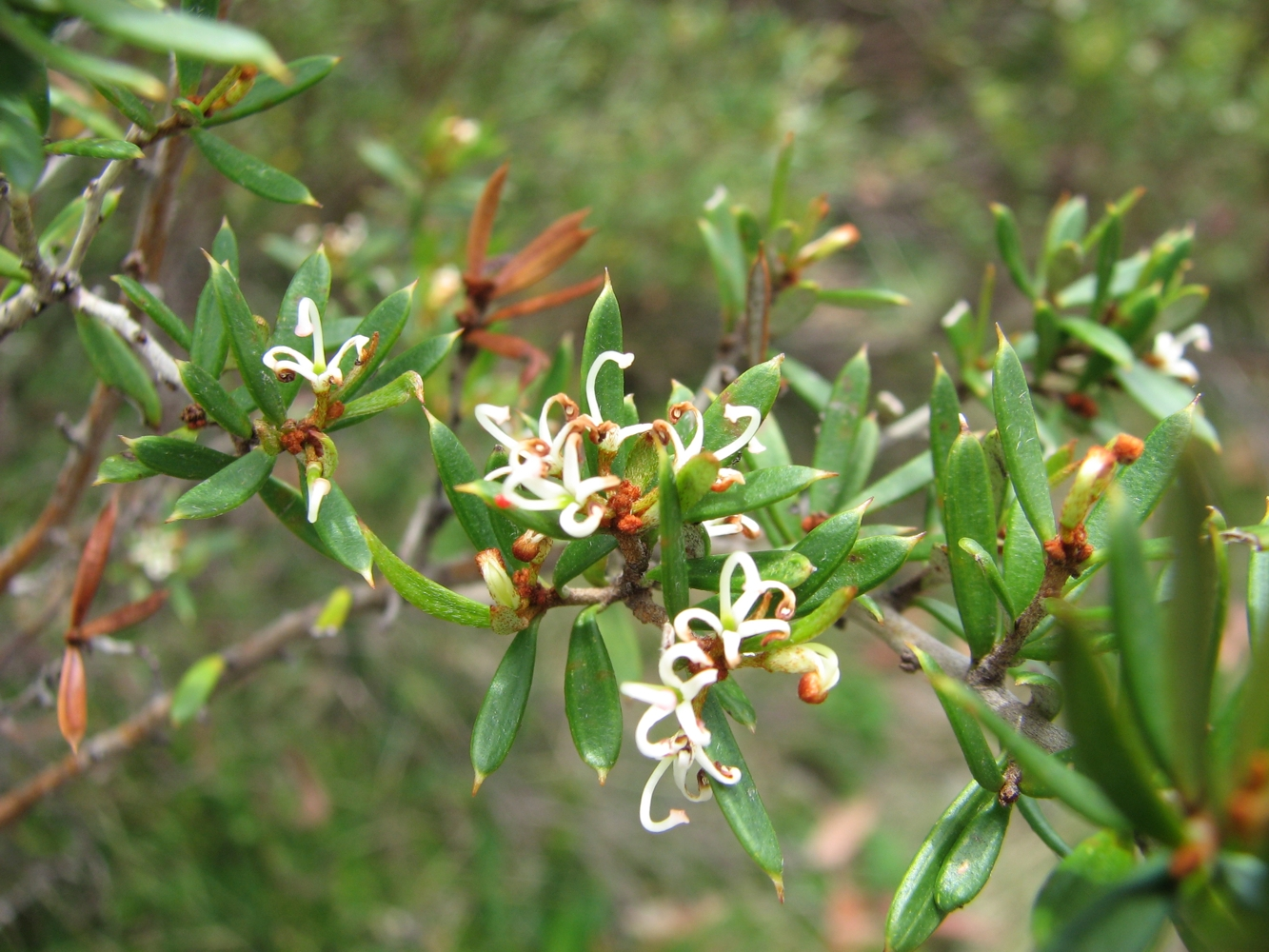
- Grevillea australis Baw Baw National Park, Victoria

Conservation status
- Least Concern (IUCN 3.1)

Scientific classification
- Kingdom: Plantae
- Clade: Embryophytes
- Clade: Tracheophytes
- Clade: Spermatophytes
- Clade: Angiosperms
- Clade: Eudicots
- Order: Proteales
- Family: Proteaceae
- Genus: Grevillea
- Species: G. australis

Binomial name
- Grevillea australis R.Br.

Synonyms
- List: Grevillea amplicifolia Meisn. nom. inval.; Grevillea amplifica F.Muell. ex Meisn. nom. inval., pro syn.; Grevillea australis R.Br. var. australis; Grevillea australis var. brevifolia Hook.f.; Grevillea australis var. erecta Hook.f.; Grevillea australis var. linearifolia Hook.f.; Grevillea australis var. montana Hook.f.; Grevillea australis var. planifolia Hook.f.; Grevillea australis var. subulata Hook.f.; Grevillea australis var. tenuifolia (R.Br.) Meisn.; Grevillea stuartii Meisn.; Grevillea tenuifolia R.Br.

= Grevillea australis =

Alpine grevillea

Species of plant endemic to Australia

Grevillea australis, commonly known as alpine grevillea or southern grevillea, is a species of flowering plant in the family Proteaceae and is endemic to south-eastern Australia. It is a spreading to prostrate shrub with simple, narrowly egg-shaped leaves and groups of white to pale pink flowers with a glabrous ovary.

== Description ==
Grevillea australis is a densely-foliaged, erect to spreading or prostrate shrub that grows to a height of 0.3–1.2 m (1 ft 0 in – 3 ft 11 in). Its leaves are simple, narrowly egg-shaped with the narrower end towards the base or linear, 5–30 mm (0.20–1.18 in) long and 0.5–5.5 mm (0.020–0.217 in) wide with the edges turned down or rolled under. The flowers are arranged in groups near the ends of braches along a rachis 1.0–2.5 mm (0.039–0.098 in) long, and are white or pale pink. The pistil is 6.0–7.5 mm (0.24–0.30 in) long and cream-coloured, the style is hooked near the tip, the ovary stalked and glabrous. Flowering mostly occurs from December to February and the fruit is a glabrous follicle.

== Taxonomy ==
Grevillea australis was first formally described in 1810 by Robert Brown in Transactions of the Linnean Society of London. The specific epithet (australis) means "southern".

== Distribution and habitat ==
Alpine grevillea grows heath and woodland, usually in moist, rocky places in mountain and alpine areas south from the Brindabella Range in the Australian Capital Territory, through southern New South Wales to Mount Buller and Mount Baw Baw in Victoria. It is also common in Tasmania, especially on the Central Plateau, and is the only grevillea species in that state.

== Conservation status ==
Grevillea australis has been listed as least concern on the IUCN Red List of Threatened Species. This species is common and occurs over a large distribution. Its known, current threats are currently not impacting the species to a great enough extent to warrant a threatened or near threatened category. Threats include impacts from climate change and altered hydrological regimes.

== Use in horticulture ==
Grevillea australis grows best in cool to cold climates. It grows best in sunny locations in well-drained soil.
