= Mitta Mitta =

Mitta Mitta is the name of several places in Australia:

- Mitta Mitta, New South Wales, a farming community
- Mitta Mitta, Victoria, a small town
  - Mitta Mitta Airport, Victoria
- Mitta Mitta River, a major tributary of the Murray River in Victoria, Australia

== See also ==
- Mitta (disambiguation)
