= Mitta =

Mitta may refer to:

- Alexander Mitta (1933–2025), Soviet and Russian film director, screenwriter and actor
- Mitta, an old Anglo-Saxon measure of capacity
- Mitta River, major tributary of the Murray River in Victoria, Australia
- Mitta United Football Club, Australian Rules Football club in Mitta Mitta, Victoria

== See also ==
- Mitta Mitta (disambiguation)
