= Gordon Yea =

Australian rules footballer (1924–2020)

Personal information
- Full name: Gordon Albert Yea
- Born: 13 November 1924; Mitta Mitta, Victoria
- Died: 12 August 2020 (aged 95)
- Original team: Mitta Mitta
- Height: 179 cm (5 ft 10 in)
- Weight: 73 kg (161 lb)
- Position: rover

Playing career^{1}
Years	Club	Games (Goals)
1948	North Melbourne	2 (2)
- ^{1} Playing statistics correct to the end of 1948.

Gordon Albert Yea (13 November 1924 – 12 August 2020) was an Australian rules footballer who played with North Melbourne in the Victorian Football League (VFL).

Yea was recruited from Mitta Mitta and played with Essendon's Reserves in 1947 prior to playing with North Melbourne in 1948.

Yea made his debut with Brunswick in July 1949.

He died in August 2020 at the age of 95.
