= Dart River (Victoria) =

River in Victoria, Australia

Dart
- Location of the Dart River mouth at Lake Dartmouth in Victoria

Location
- Country: Australia
- State: Victoria
- Region: Australian Alps (IBRA), Victorian Alps
- Local government area: Towong

Physical characteristics
- Source: Victorian Alps
  - location: Wabba Wilderness Park
  - coordinates: 36°33′21″S 147°38′58″E
  - elevation: 898 m (2,946 ft)
- Mouth: confluence with the Mitta Mitta River
  - location: Lake Dartmouth
  - coordinates: 36°27′15″S 147°46′32″E
  - elevation: 451 m (1,480 ft)
- Length: 29 km (18 mi)

Basin features
- River system: North-East Murray catchment, Murray-Darling basin
- Tributaries
  - left: Brown Creek, McKay Creek (Victoria)
  - right: Thilluna Creek, Raymond Creek, Vincent Creek (Victoria), Shady Creek
- Reservoir: Dartmouth (452 m (1,483 ft))

The Dart River, a perennial river of the North-East Murray catchment of the Murray-Darling basin, is located in the Alpine region of Victoria, Australia. It flows from the northwestern slopes of the Alpine National Park in the Australian Alps, south and joins with the Mitta Mitta River within Lake Dartmouth.

== Course ==
The river rises in remote state forestry land within the Wabba Wilderness Park, below the Great Dividing Range. The river flows generally south by southwest, joined by six minor tributaries before reaching its confluence with the Mitta Mitta River at Lake Dartmouth, formed by the Dartmouth Dam. The river descends 447 metres (1,467 ft) over its 29-kilometre (18 mi) course.

== Recreation ==
The river is popular for fishing, with abundant brown trout to 400 grams (14 oz), some rainbow trout to 200 grams (7.1 oz), numerous river blackfish to 80 grams (2.8 oz) and a few small redfin and Macquarie perch at some times of the year.

An area of approximately 35,000 hectares (86,000 acres) located adjacent to where the Dart River empties into Lake Dartmouth, named the Dart River Goldfields Area, is listed as an indicative area on the Register of the National Estate. The area is considered historically significant due to its relatively undisturbed setting of the history of gold mining, with many machinery relics from the 1870s.

== See also ==
- List of rivers of Australia § Victoria
