= Jack Scales =

Australian rules footballer

Personal information
- Full name: Isaac Larsen Scales
- Born: 2 September 1897; Mitta Mitta, Victoria
- Died: 13 March 1973 (aged 75); Mitta Mitta, Victoria
- Original team: Mitta Mitta FC
- Height: 191 cm (6 ft 3 in)
- Weight: 87 kg (192 lb)

Playing career^{1}
Years	Club	Games (Goals)
1923–24	Fitzroy	12 (3)
- ^{1} Playing statistics correct to the end of 1924.

Isaac Larsen "Jack" Scales (2 September 1897 – 13 March 1973) was an Australian rules footballer who played with Fitzroy in the Victorian Football League (VFL).

Scales was the younger brother of Fitzroy player Joe Scales.
