= Banimboola Hydroelectric Power Station =

- Interactive map of Banimboola Hydroelectric Power Station
- Official name: Banimboola Power Station
- Country: Australia
- Location: Victoria
- Coordinates: 36°32′3″S 147°27′35″E
- Status: Operational
- Opening date: December 2005
- Construction cost: A$23 million
- Operator: AGL Hydro

Upper reservoir
- Creates: Dartmouth Reservoir

Lower reservoir
- Creates: Banimboola Pondage

Power Station
- Turbines: 3 x Kaplan-type turbo generators
- Installed capacity: 12.2 MW (16,400 hp)
- Annual generation: 35 GWh (130 TJ)
- Website; Banimboola Power Station at AGL Energy

Banimboola Power Station is a hydroelectric power station on the Dartmouth Dam Regulating Pond (or Banimboola Pondage), downstream of Dartmouth Dam on the Mitta Mitta River in Victoria, Australia. Banimboola has three turbo generators, with a generating capacity of 12.2 megawatts (16,360 hp) of electricity. It is owned and operated by AGL Energy.
