= Ben Paton =

Ben Paton may refer to:

- Ben Paton (Australian footballer), Australian rules footballer
- Ben Paton (soccer), Canadian soccer player
