= Mount Hotham Alpine Resort =

Alpine resort in Victoria, Australia

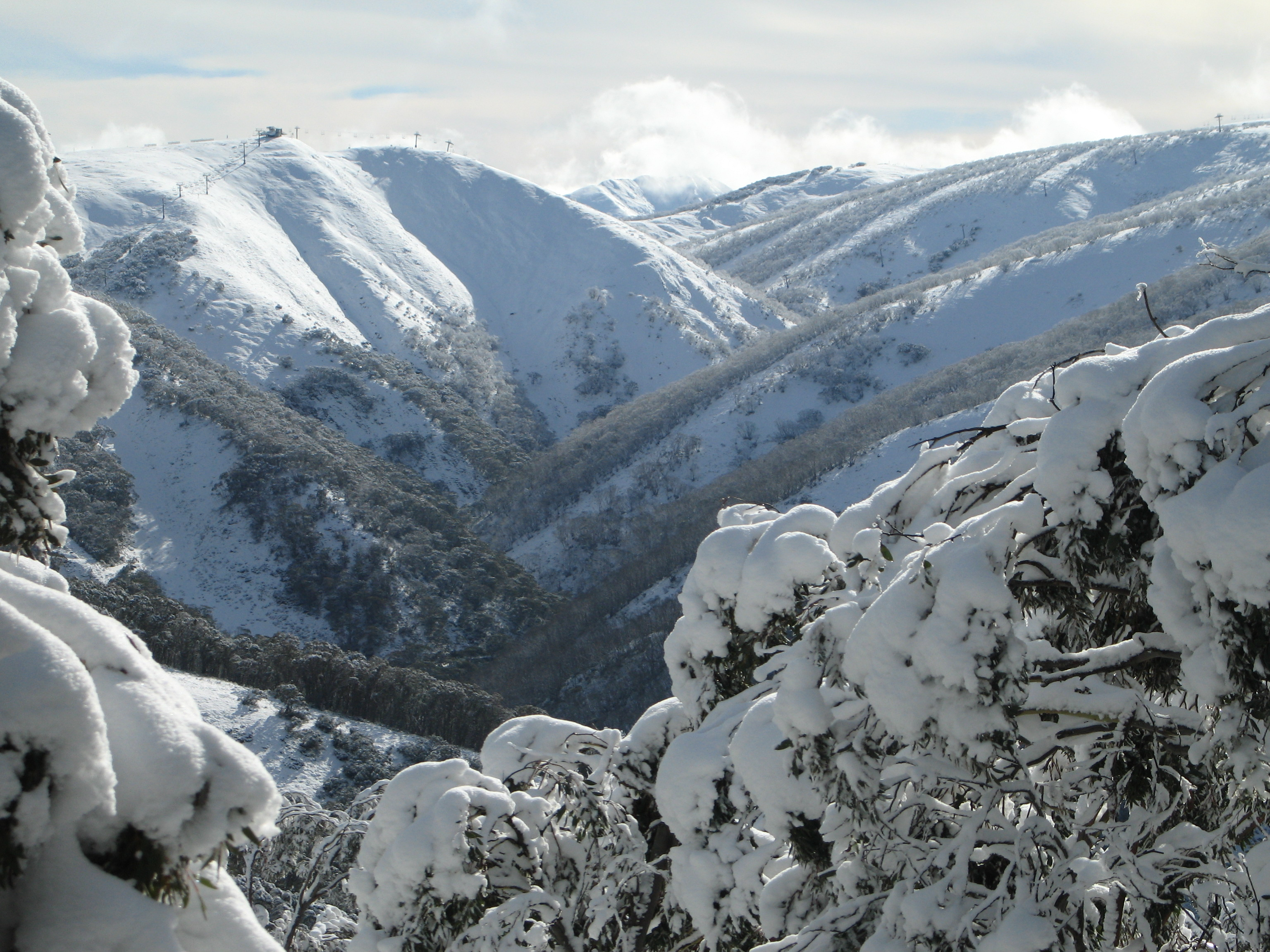
- Mary's Slide ski run
- Interactive map of Mount Hotham Alpine Resort
- Location: Victoria, Australia
- Mountain: Mount Higginbotham, Mount Hotham, Mount Loch
- Nearest city: Melbourne
- Coordinates: 36°59′S 147°8′E
- Status: Operating
- Owner: Vail Resorts
- Vertical: 395 metres (1,296 ft)
- Top elevation: 1,845 metres (6,053 ft) AHD
- Base elevation: 1,450 metres (4,760 ft) AHD
- Skiable area: 320 hectares (790 acres)
- Trails: 72
- Longest run: Spargo's, 2.5 kilometres (1.6 mi)
- Lift system: 14 lifts
- Lift capacity: 24,485 passengers/hr
- Terrain parks: 4 (snow dependent)
- Snowfall: 300 centimetres (120 in)
- Snowmaking: Yes, 25 hectares (62 acres)
- Night skiing: Yes, Wednesday & Saturday
- Website: www.mthotham.com.au

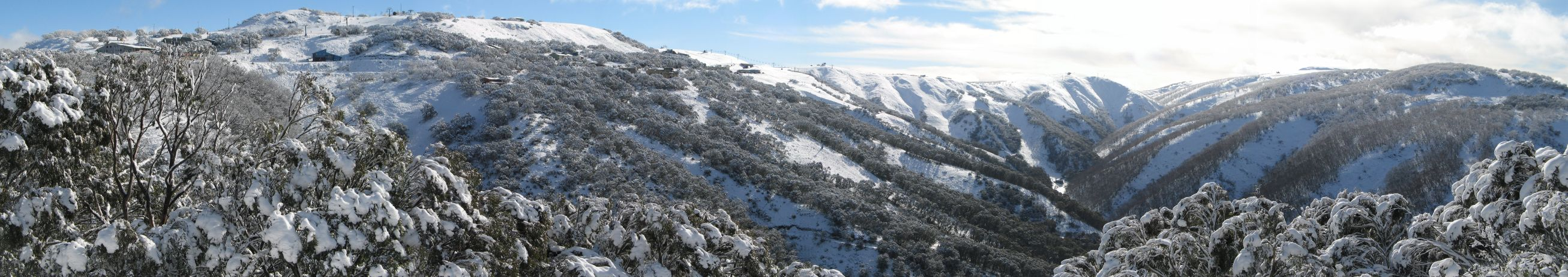
The ski fields of Mount Hotham from Mount Higginbotham (left) across to Mount Loch (right) and beyond.

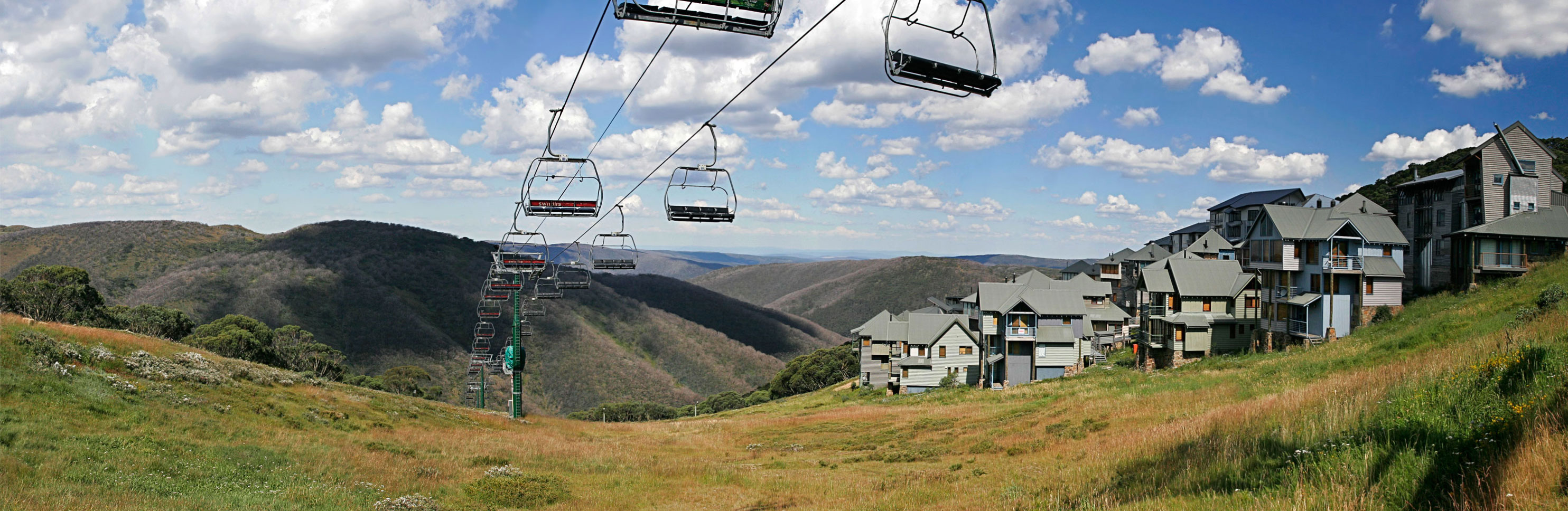
Mount Hotham's Village Chair in the summer.

Mount Hotham Alpine Resort is an Australian alpine resort, is located in the Alpine region of Victoria. Set on the slopes of Mount Hotham, the ski resort comprises an alpine village, situated at an altitude of 1,750 metres (5,740 ft) AHD, making it the second highest resort village in Australia after Charlotte Pass village, in New South Wales.

The alpine resort operations are located within an unincorporated area (statutory authority) of Victoria surrounded by the locality of Hotham Heights in the Alpine Shire. Road access to the resort is via the Great Alpine Road. It is located approximately 11 kilometres (6.8 mi) west of Dinner Plain and 31 kilometres (19 mi) south of Bright. Hotham Alpine Resort is located approximately 226 kilometres (140 mi) northeast of Melbourne.

Mount Hotham is host to a number of historic sites, namely the Zirky's Mount Hotham Hotel, Snake Gully and Arlberg Chalet.

== Ownership and operation ==
The land of the resort is operated by Alpine Resorts Victoria, the statutory authority, and the skifields and lift infrastructure are operated by Vail Resorts (leaseholder), who purchased the Mount Hotham Skiing Company from Merlin Entertainments. Vail Resorts' operating company is Mount Hotham Skiing Company (MHSC), that was granted a lease from the Government of Victoria via the Mt Hotham Resort Management Board. A subsidiary company of MHSC operates the Mount Hotham Airport.

== Winter sports ==
Hotham has 320 hectares (790 acres) of ski area including 35 kilometres (22 mi) of cross-country trails and a network of fourteen lifts.

The longest run at Hotham is 2.5 kilometres (1.6 mi). The resort includes runs for skiers and boarders of all standards.

The resort is home to one of Australia's most difficult runs, the steep Mary's Slide. It is also home to Australia's only biathlon range, which is used for professional competition and training, including by Australian Olympian Darcie Morton.

== Summer activities ==
In summer the main activities are cycling and bushwalking with alpine wildflowers being prolific from December to February. The Falls to Hotham alpine crossing is a 37km three day hike that starts at Falls Creek and finishes at Mount Hotham. A planned expansion of the walk to make it 52km over 4 days with new huts being built has raised community concerns.

== Climate ==
As with most of the Australian Alps, Mount Hotham's climate is, compared to the bulk of Australia, cold throughout the year; with particularly cold maximum temperatures, and Mount Hotham is one of very few areas in Australia that frequently records maximum temperatures below freezing. Mount Hotham is also one of the only places in Australia to have never recorded a temperature above 30 °C (86 °F); during the early 2009 southeastern Australia heat wave, whilst most of the state sweltered above 45 °C (113 °F), the mountain's peak temperature was a mild 28.1 °C (82.6 °F).

Snow occurs frequently and heavily, and sub-freezing maximum temperatures can be recorded throughout the year—even in high summer. However, due to frequent winter cloud and the mountain's exposed position, a temperature below −10 °C (14 °F) has only once-occurred since records began in 1990. Mount Hotham receives an average of 66.1 snowy days annually.

Owing to its short, cool summers and long, cold winters, Mount Hotham has a Subpolar oceanic climate (Cfc) bordering on Tundra (ET).

Climate data for Mount Hotham (1991–2020, extremes 1977–2025); 1,849 m AMSL; 36.98° S, 147.13° E
Month	Jan	Feb	Mar	Apr	May	Jun	Jul	Aug	Sep	Oct	Nov	Dec	Year
Record high °C (°F)	28.2 (82.8)	28.2 (82.8)	26.8 (80.2)	21.0 (69.8)	19.8 (67.6)	11.6 (52.9)	8.7 (47.7)	10.7 (51.3)	15.3 (59.5)	19.6 (67.3)	25.5 (77.9)	26.3 (79.3)	28.2 (82.8)
Mean maximum °C (°F)	23.8 (74.8)	22.2 (72.0)	19.2 (66.6)	13.9 (57.0)	11.1 (52.0)	7.4 (45.3)	4.7 (40.5)	6.0 (42.8)	10.2 (50.4)	15.2 (59.4)	18.8 (65.8)	21.2 (70.2)	24.6 (76.3)
Mean daily maximum °C (°F)	16.6 (61.9)	15.9 (60.6)	13.1 (55.6)	8.5 (47.3)	4.6 (40.3)	1.5 (34.7)	−0.1 (31.8)	0.5 (32.9)	3.5 (38.3)	7.7 (45.9)	11.4 (52.5)	14.0 (57.2)	8.1 (46.6)
Daily mean °C (°F)	12.4 (54.3)	12.0 (53.6)	9.5 (49.1)	5.6 (42.1)	2.3 (36.1)	−0.5 (31.1)	−1.9 (28.6)	−1.5 (29.3)	1.0 (33.8)	4.3 (39.7)	7.6 (45.7)	9.9 (49.8)	5.1 (41.1)
Mean daily minimum °C (°F)	8.2 (46.8)	8.0 (46.4)	5.8 (42.4)	2.7 (36.9)	−0.1 (31.8)	−2.4 (27.7)	−3.6 (25.5)	−3.5 (25.7)	−1.6 (29.1)	0.9 (33.6)	3.8 (38.8)	5.8 (42.4)	2.0 (35.6)
Mean minimum °C (°F)	−0.8 (30.6)	−0.7 (30.7)	−2.2 (28.0)	−3.9 (25.0)	−5.6 (21.9)	−6.9 (19.6)	−7.1 (19.2)	−7.8 (18.0)	−7.0 (19.4)	−5.8 (21.6)	−4.3 (24.3)	−3.0 (26.6)	−8.5 (16.7)
Record low °C (°F)	−3.7 (25.3)	−5.4 (22.3)	−6.8 (19.8)	−8.2 (17.2)	−7.4 (18.7)	−9.1 (15.6)	−10.0 (14.0)	−10.4 (13.3)	−9.1 (15.6)	−8.4 (16.9)	−7.0 (19.4)	−6.8 (19.8)	−10.4 (13.3)
Average precipitation mm (inches)	102.1 (4.02)	99.9 (3.93)	116.7 (4.59)	104.1 (4.10)	138.4 (5.45)	121.4 (4.78)	128.1 (5.04)	103.2 (4.06)	121.9 (4.80)	129.3 (5.09)	138.7 (5.46)	124.4 (4.90)	1,428.2 (56.22)
Average precipitation days (≥ 0.2 mm)	11.0	10.8	12.3	12.6	14.6	14.3	18.3	16.0	15.1	13.0	12.5	11.3	161.8
Average afternoon relative humidity (%) (at 3 pm)	63	65	67	76	82	89	89	88	84	75	69	64	76
Source: Bureau of Meteorology

== See also ==
- Mount Hotham Airport
- Great Alpine Road
- Skiing in Australia
