= Cobungra River =

Cobungra
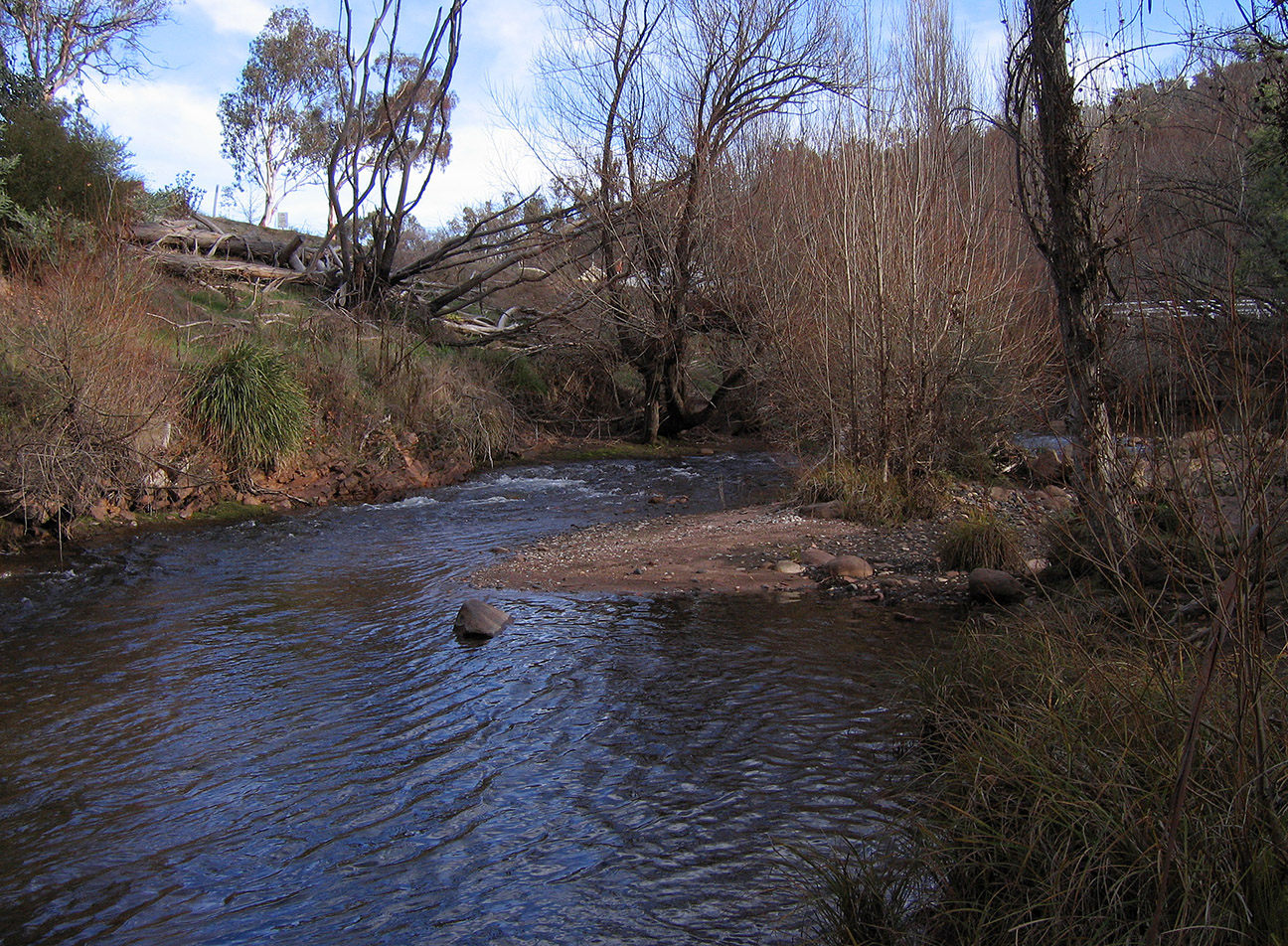
- Cobungra River at Anglers Rest

- Location of the Cobungra River mouth in Victoria
- Native name: Karbungerer (Dhudhuroa)

Location
- Country: Australia
- State: Victoria
- Region: Victorian Alps (IBRA), East Gippsland
- Local government area: East Gippsland Shire

Physical characteristics
- Source: Victorian Alps
  - location: below Mount Hotham and Mount Loch
  - coordinates: 36°58′S 147°9′E
  - elevation: 1,400 m (4,600 ft)
- Mouth: confluence with the Big River to form the Mitta Mitta River
  - location: Anglers Rest
  - coordinates: 36°59′23″S 147°30′40″E
  - elevation: 694 m (2,277 ft)
- Length: 55 km (34 mi)

Basin features
- River system: North-East Murray catchment, Murray-Darling basin
- Tributaries
  - left: Victoria River (Victoria)
  - right: Swindlers Creek
- National park: Alpine National Park

The Cobungra River, a perennial river of the North-East Murray catchment of the Murray-Darling basin, is located in the East Gippsland and Alpine regions of Victoria, Australia.

== Location and features ==
The Cobungra River rises below the slopes of the ski resort at Mount Hotham and Mount Loch and flows generally east and then north, joined by two tributaries including the Victoria River. At its confluence with the Big River in the Alpine National Park, near Anglers Rest on the Omeo Highway, the two rivers become the Mitta Mitta River, itself a tributary of the Murray River. The Cobungra River descends 743 metres (2,438 ft) over its 55-kilometre (34 mi) course.

The current historical Omeo Highway bridge at Anglers Rest stands on the site of the former river ford known as Jack's Crossing, named for an overseer at the nearby Mount Wills station who drowned while leading a team of packhorses across the flooded river in 1856.

The Cobungra River is particularly noted as being good for trout fishing, in particular brown trout. It was one of thirteen locations worldwide featured on the fly fishing documentary television series A River Somewhere.

== See also ==
- List of rivers of Australia § Victoria
