= Joe Scales =

Australian rules footballer

Personal information
- Full name: Joseph Lindley Scales
- Born: 25 July 1895; Mitta Mitta, Victoria
- Died: 29 July 1967 (aged 72); Macleod, Victoria
- Original team: Mitta Mitta FC
- Height: 178 cm (5 ft 10 in)
- Weight: 81 kg (179 lb)

Playing career^{1}
| Years | Club | Games (Goals) |
| 1921–23 | Fitzroy | 25 (0) |
| 1924 | St Kilda | 15 (5) |
| Total | | 40 (5) |
- ^{1} Playing statistics correct to the end of 1924.

Joseph Lindley Scales, DSO, MM (25 July 1895 – 29 July 1967) was an Australian soldier and Australian rules footballer who played with Fitzroy and St Kilda in the Victorian Football League (VFL).

Scales was appointed as Prahan's captain-coach in the VFA in 1925, when Howell's engagement was terminated.

Born in Mitta Mitta, Victoria, Scales joined the Australian Imperial Force on 1 February 1915 for service in the First World War. He was awarded the Military Medal for leading a daylight patrol and gathering valuable intelligence at Bapaume in March 1917 and was commissioned a second lieutenant the following month. At Poelcappelle in October, he led a platoon with "conspicuous gallantry" and singlehandedly cleared a German machine-gun post, for which he was recommended for the Victoria Cross. He was instead awarded the Distinguished Service Order.

Scales was subsequently Mentioned in Despatches and, with the war over, returned to Australia in July 1919 and soon after relinquished his commission. He returned to service in the Second World War, rising to the rank of captain while posted to Headquarters, Australian Military Forces.

Older brother of Jack Scales.
