= Prairie Branch =

Stream in the American state of Missouri

Coordinates: 39.2411535°N 91.3270946°W

Prairie Branch is a stream in Pike County in the U.S. state of Missouri. It is a tributary of Indian Creek.

Prairie Branch took its name from West Prairie, a prairie along its course.

== See also ==
- List of rivers of Missouri
