= Mitta United Football Club =

Australian rules football club

Mitta United

Names
- Full name: Mitta United Football Netball Club
- Nickname(s): Mountain Men, Blues

2026 season
- Home-and-away season: 9th of 12
- Leading goalkicker: Lincoln Reed
- Best and fairest: Tom Gibbs

Club details
- Founded: 1952; 74 years ago
- Colours
- Competition: Tallangatta & DFL
- President: Laurence Hodgkin & Justin McInnes
- Coach: Beau Packer
- Captain: Jesse Kennett
- Premierships: 22
- Ground: Eskdale reserve/Mitta Football Ground

Uniforms
Home

The Mitta United Football Netball Club, nicknamed the Mountain Men or the Blues, is an Australian rules football and netball club playing in the Tallangatta & District Football League. The club is based in Mitta Mitta, Victoria and Eskdale, Victoria.

== History ==
The club is a merger of Mitta Town and Eskdale football teams, which initially occurred in 1940, then again in 1945, after World War Two

The club then was de-merged in 1947, into Mitta Town and Mitta Valley Football Club's.

The club's then remerged in 1952 as a merger of Mitta Town and Eskdale (formerly Mitta Valley).

A Gard won the club's inaugural best and award in 1952.

Mitta Mitta Football Club - Timeline

- 1883–1898: – local games
- 1899: Benambra Football Association
- 1900 - 1901: Nobel's Hamburg Trophy
- 1902 - 1906: Local games ?
- 1907: Mitta Mitta Football League
- 1908: Tallangatta & District Football League
- 1909–1923: Club in Recess
- 1924–1926: Mitta Mitta Football League
- 1927–1931: Club in Recess
- 1932: Yackandandah & District Football League
- 1933: Tallangatta & District Football Association
- 1934–1935: Club in Recess
- 1936: Chiltern & District Football Association
- 1937 & 1938: Club in Recess. Mitta applied to join the Dederang & District Football League in 1937, but were refused and went into recess in 1937 & 1938
- 1939: Mitta Mitta Junior FC active playing matches against other local teams.
- 1940: Kiewa & Mitta Football League as Mitta Valley
- 1944: Mitta Valley Patriotic Football Association

Premierships

- Benambra Football Association
  - 1899: 1st - Mitta FC
- Nobel's Hamburg Football Trophy
  - 1900 - Mitta Mitta d Eskdale
- Kiewa & District Football Association
  - 1928 - Mitta Valley: 12.8 - 80 d Granya: 4.11 - 35
- Tallangatta & District Football Association
  - 1930 - Mitta Mita: 5.11 - 41 defeated Granya: 4.14 - 38
  - 1931 - Mitta Mitta: 8.17 - 65 d Tallangatta: 2.1 - 13
- Yackandandah & District Football League
  - 1932: Mitta Mitta: 12.9 - 81 defeated Tallangatta: 8.4 - 52

Eskdale Football Club - Timeline

- 1907: Mitta Mitta Football League
- 1908: Tallangatta & District Football League
- 1913: Mitta Valley Football Association
- 1935–1939: Dederang District Football Association
- 1940: Kiewa & Mitta Football League as Mitta Valley
- 1944: Mitta Valley Patriotic Football Association
- 1945–1946: Tallangatta & District Football League as Eskdale-Mitta
- 1947–1950: Tallangatta & District Football League as Mitta Valley
- 1951: Tallangatta & District Football League as Eskdale

Premierships

- Dederang & District Football Association
  - 1935 - Eskdale: defeated Tawonga: by 4 goals
  - 1938 - Eskdale: 16.14 - 110 d Kiewa: 5.6 - 36
- Kiewa & Mitta Football League (1940)
  - 1940 - Mitta Valley: 12.8 - 80 d Tallangatta: 9.12 - 66

== Football Premierships ==
The Mitta United FC has won five senior football T&DFL grand finals by one point and was the first club in T&DFL to win four consecutive Grand Finals in - 2004, 2005, 2006, 2007.

Seniors

- Tallangatta & District Football League (22)
  - 1952, 1953, 1959, 1960, 1961, 1963, 1967, 1968, 1973, 1975, 1978, 1982, 1986, 1988, 1992, 1993, 1996, 2004, 2005, 2006, 2007, 2012.

== League Best & Fairest Awards ==
- Kiewa & Mitta Valley Football Association
  - 1940 - W Hodgkin: Mitta Mitta & Norm Webb: Granya - 12 votes each

Tallangatta & District Football League

- Seniors - J A Paton Trophy
  - 1947 - Colin Scales (Mitta Town)
  - 1948 - W L "Raff" Webb
  - 1966 - Des Dower
  - 1976 - Gary Fox
- Seniors - Barton Medal
  - 1984 - P Tobin
  - 1985 - John Smith
  - 1988, 1989, 1991 - Hughie Giltrip
  - 2003 - Justin Nelson
  - 2007 - Chris Nelson
  - 2012 - Nathan Reynoldson
- Reserves

== VFL / AFL Players ==
The following footballers played with Mitta prior to playing senior VFL / AFL football.

- 1921 - Joe Scales - Fitzroy
- 1923 - Jack Scales - Fitzroy
- 1948 - Gordon Yea - North Melbourne
- 2009 - Jack Ziebell - North Melbourne
- 2018 - Ben Paton - St Kilda

The following footballers played VFL / AFL prior to playing with Mitta.

- 1975 - Frank Hodgkin - St Kilda
