= Gibbo River =

Gibbo
- Location of the Gibbo River mouth at Lake Dartmouth in Victoria

Location
- Country: Australia
- State: Victoria
- Region: Australian Alps (IBRA), Victorian Alps, East Gippsland
- Local government area: East Gippsland

Physical characteristics
- Source confluence: Straight Running Creek and the Sassafras Creek
  - location: Victorian Alps
  - coordinates: 36°40′0″S 147°48′39″E
  - elevation: 674 m (2,211 ft)
- Mouth: confluence with Morass Creek
  - location: southeast of Lake Dartmouth
  - coordinates: 36°45′3″S 147°39′55″E
  - elevation: 483 m (1,585 ft)
- Length: 19 km (12 mi)

Basin features
- River system: North-East Murray catchment, Murray-Darling basin
- Tributaries
  - left: Turnback Creek, Japan Creek
  - right: Donnovan Creek
- Reservoir: Dartmouth (483 m (1,585 ft))

The Gibbo River, a perennial river of the North-East Murray catchment of the Murray-Darling basin, is located in the Alpine and East Gippsland regions of Victoria, Australia. It flows from the northwestern slopes of the Australian Alps, south and joins with Morass Creek southeast of Lake Dartmouth.

== Course ==
Formed by the confluence of the Straight Running Creek and the Sassafras Creek, the Gibbo River rises in remote state forestry land, below the Great Dividing Range. The river flows generally south by southwest, joined by three minor tributaries before reaching its confluence with the Morass Creek at Lake Dartmouth, formed by the Dartmouth Dam. The river descends 191 metres (627 ft) over its 19-kilometre (12 mi) course.

== Recreation ==
The river is popular for fishing, with numerous brown trout with an average of 200 grams (7.1 oz) to a maximum of 1 kilogram (2.2 lb), some rainbow trout to 200 grams (7.1 oz), and river blackfish to 60 grams (2.1 oz), with a few carp to 10 kilograms (22 lb).

A camping area is available, approximately 30 kilometres (19 mi) north of Omeo on the Corryong–Benambra Road. Picnic tables and wood-fired barbecues are available at the camp site.

An area of approximately 35,000 hectares (86,000 acres) located adjacent to where the Gibbo River and Morass Creek empty into Lake Dartmouth, named the Dart River Goldfields Area, is listed as an indicative area on the Register of the National Estate. The area is considered historically significant due to its relatively undisturbed setting of the history of gold mining, with many machinery relics from the 1870s.

== See also ==
- List of rivers of Australia § Victoria
