= Victoria River (Victoria) =

River in Victoria, Australia

Victoria
- Location of the Victoria River mouth in Victoria

Location
- Country: Australia
- State: Victoria
- Region: Victorian Alps (IBRA), East Gippsland
- Local government area: East Gippsland Shire

Physical characteristics
- Source: Victorian Alps
  - location: below Bull Plain
  - coordinates: 37°2′S 147°17′E
  - elevation: 1,300 m (4,300 ft)
- Mouth: confluence with the Cobungra River
  - location: north of Cobungra
  - coordinates: 37°4′24″S 147°27′44″E
  - elevation: 830 m (2,720 ft)
- Length: 25 km (16 mi)

Basin features
- River system: North-East Murray catchment, Murray–Darling basin
- National park: Alpine National Park

The Victoria River, a perennial river of the North-East Murray catchment of the Murray–Darling basin, is located in the East Gippsland and Alpine regions of Victoria, Australia.

== Location and features ==
The Victoria River rises below Bull Plain, near Rundells Yard, and flows generally east and then north, joined by one minor tributary, before reaching its confluence with the Cobungra River in the Alpine National Park, north of the locality of Cobungra. The river descends 475 metres (1,558 ft) over its 25-kilometre (16 mi) course.

The river is traversed by Great Alpine Road near Cobungra. The Victoria River Track, a walking trail, follows much of the course of the river.

== See also ==
- List of rivers of Australia § Victoria
