= Shady Creek =

Stream in the American state of Missouri

Coordinates: 39.253653°N 91.344317°W

Shady Creek is a stream in Audrain and Pike Counties in the U.S. state of Missouri. It is a tributary of Indian Creek.

Shady Creek, historically also called "Shady Branch", was so named on account of the shade trees lining its banks.

== See also ==
- List of rivers of Missouri
