= Mitta Mitta Airport =

Airport in Victoria, Australia

Coordinates: 36°30.7′S 147°21.4′E

Mitta Airport is a small Australian rural airport which serves the town of Mitta Mitta in Victoria's northeast. The 910m gravel runway is parallel to the Omeo Highway 4 km north of Mitta Mitta. The airport is used by air ambulances, pilot training flights, fire fighting and for visitors to the area.

== Pilot Information ==
The airfield was originally established to support the construction of the Dartmouth Dam and is available for public use with prior approval. The airfield is located 4 km to the north of Mitta Mitta parallel to the Omeo Highway. The Mitta Airfield Designator is YITT.

Airfield and weather details

== See also ==
- List of airports in Victoria (Australia)
