= Dartmouth Dam =

Dam in Victoria, Australia

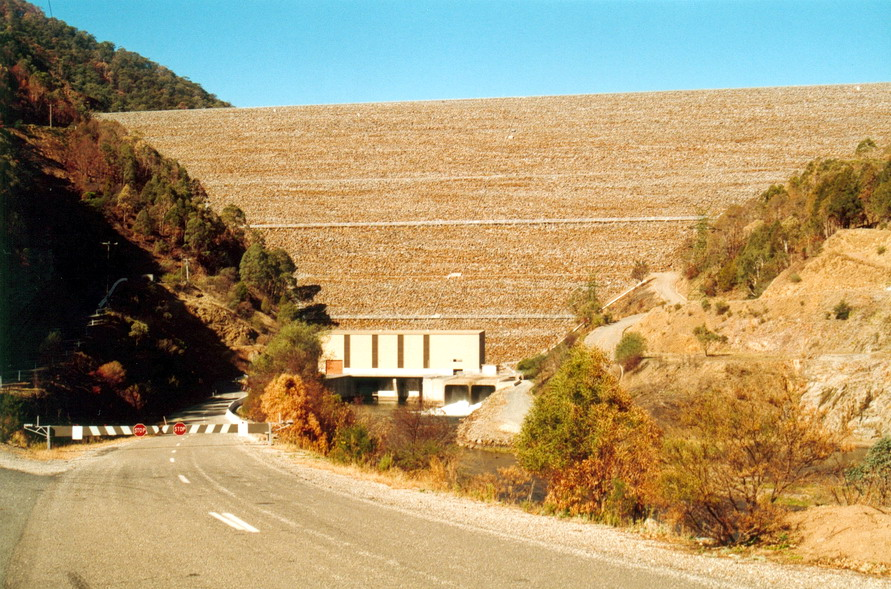
- The dam wall, April 2003

- Location of the dam in Victoria
- Interactive map of Dartmouth Dam
- Country: Australia
- Location: Victoria
- Coordinates: 36°33′29″S 147°31′25″E
- Purpose: Irrigation; Hydro-electric power; Water supply; Conservation
- Status: Operational
- Construction began: 1973
- Opening date: 1979
- Construction cost: A$179 million
- Built by: Thiess Brothers
- Designed by: Snowy Mountains Engineering Corporation
- Owner: Murray Darling Basin Authority
- Operator: Goulburn–Murray Water

Dam and spillways
- Type of dam: Gravity dam
- Impounds: Mitta Mitta River; Gibbo River; Dart River; Morass Creek and others
- Height (thalweg): 180 m (590 ft)
- Length: 92 m (302 ft)
- Elevation at crest: 486 m (1,594 ft) AHD
- Width (crest): 670 m (2,200 ft)
- Width (base): 700 m (2,300 ft)
- Dam volume: 14.1×10^{6} m^{3} (500×10^{6} cu ft)
- Spillway type: Uncontrolled chute stepped
- Spillway capacity: 2,750 m^{3}/s (97,000 cu ft/s)

Reservoir
- Creates: Dartmouth Reservoir
- Total capacity: 3,856 GL (3,126,000 acre⋅ft)
- Inactive capacity: 71 GL (58,000 acre⋅ft)
- Catchment area: 3,600 km^{2} (1,400 sq mi)
- Surface area: 6,300 ha (16,000 acres)

Dartmouth Power Station
- Operator: AGL Energy
- Commission date: January 1981
- Type: Conventional
- Turbines: 1 × 180 MW (240,000 hp) (Francis-type)
- Installed capacity: 150 MW (200,000 hp)
- Annual generation: 310 GWh (1,100 TJ)
- Website: mdba.gov.au; g-mwater.com.au

The Dartmouth Dam is a large gravity dam across the Mitta Mitta, Gibbo and Dart rivers, the Morass Creek and a number of small tributaries. The dam is located near Mount Bogong in the north-east of the Australian state of Victoria. The dam's purpose includes irrigation, the generation of hydroelectricity, water supply and conservation. The impounded reservoir is called Dartmouth Reservoir, sometimes called Lake Dartmouth. The Dartmouth Power Station, a conventional hydroelectric power station generates power to the national grid, is located near the dam wall. The dam is Australia's tallest dam, at 180 metres (590 ft).

A smaller pond, called the Dartmouth Dam Regulating Pond or Banimboola Pondage, approximately 9 kilometres (6 mi) downstream of the main dam, also across the Mitta Mitta River, is located adjacent the Banimboola Hydroelectric Power Station and forms part of the Dartmouth Dam complex of facilities.

== Dam and reservoir overview ==
=== Dam ===
Developed by the State Rivers & Water Supply Commission of Victoria, construction of the dam commenced in 1973, engineered by the Snowy Mountains Engineering Corporation, and was completed in 1979 by Thiess Brothers, at a cost of A$179 million. The cost was shared equally by the Commonwealth, Victorian, New South Wales and South Australian governments.

The dam wall rises to a height of 180 metres (591 ft) from the lowest part of the foundation to the roadway across the top of the dam, making the dam wall the highest in Australia. The core component materials of the wall include 10.5 million m^{3} (370 million cu ft) of rock, 0.8 million m^{3} (28 million cu ft) of filter material made from crushed quarried rock, and 2.8 million m^{3} (99 million cu ft) of earth for the core. When full, the reservoir has a capacity of 3,856 gigalitres (3,126,000 acre⋅ft), or approximately 6.7 times the capacity of Sydney Harbour; and can release a maximum outflow of approximately 12 GL (3.2 billion US gal) per day in normal operation.

The crest of the uncontrolled chute spillway is 486 metres (1,594 ft) AHD and is approximately 92 metres (302 ft) long. When full, flood flows spill over the crest and down an 80-metre-long (260 ft) concrete chute. The water then returns to the river via an open rock stepped cascade which gradually widens to 300 metres (984 ft) at river level. Once the Dartmouth Reservoir reaches 99% capacity, it is considered to be 'operationally full'. Releases are then set to pass inflows downstream to prevent the level rising further.

Releases are passed through the outlet works and power station whenever possible. Water will only flow over the spillway if significant flood inflows enter from upstream when the storage is close to full. This approach reduces the chance of downstream flooding, maximises operating flexibility for hydro-power generation, and protects the spillway. Since the dam's construction, major spill events have occurred only five times and, as of November 2024, the most recent were in Spring in 1996 and 2022.

In 2005 Engineers Australia awarded the dam as a National Engineering Landmark under their engineering heritage recognition program.

=== Reservoir ===
The Dartmouth Reservoir stores water from the Victorian High Country's snow fields for summer release into the Mitta Mitta, and the downstream Lake Hume, and into the greater Murray River for irrigation. The reservoir's inflow and outflow capacity is quite small considering its size, meaning that its levels vary little compared with some other dams on the Murray and their tributaries.

The reservoir is a popular recreational trout fishery, being regularly restocked by the Victorian Department of Primary Industries.

==== Ecological impact on the Murray–Darling Basin ====
A 2012 government report stated that the construction and operation of the Dartmouth Dam caused significant changes to the flow patterns and ecology of the Mitta Mitta and Murray rivers. In particular, the unnaturally cold water released from the dam, up to 10 °C (50 °F) colder than it naturally should be, contributed directly to the disappearance of the Murray cod, trout cod and Macquarie perch from the Mitta Mitta River within the first few years of the dam's existence. Cold water pollution caused by the Dartmouth Dam contributed to the disappearance of the freshwater catfish from the upper reaches of the Murray River.

== Hydroelectric power station ==
Designed by the State Electricity Commission of Victoria, constructed by Lewis Constructions, and commissioned in January 1981, the Dartmouth Power Station has one Francis turbine-generator, with a generating capacity of 180 megawatts (240,000 hp), the largest single installed hydroelectric turbine in Australia. It is owned and operated by AGL Energy. In 2003, the capacity of the regulating pondage was increased to further optimise the power station's generation flexibility. The station is connected to the electricity grid via a 220 kV transmission line to Mount Beauty, 40 kilometres (25 mi) away.

=== Power station damage ===
On 2 May 1990, the turbine-generator was running at full speed and stopped instantaneously. The turbine casing and concrete machine block surrounding the power station were destroyed, when two steel beams entered the turbine, left in the penstock following routine maintenance. As a result, the generating equipment moved approximately 2 metres (6 ft 7 in), within the base of the dam wall. The resulting force ruined the power station and the dam's control systems, making it impossible to gradually release water from the near-capacity dam by conventional means. An improvised system, placing large pipes over the spillway to siphon water over it, was soon installed. The inflow from an unusually wet spring meant that the dam would have overflowed, leading to a spectacular cascade over the huge rock steps, formed when the rock used for the dam was quarried from the valley walls.

After initial consternation regarding the integrity of the dam wall, after a lengthy assessment, it was declared safe. A breach of the wall would have obliterated a couple of small towns and a sparsely settled agricultural area in the relatively narrow 120-kilometre (75 mi) Mitta Mitta valley below the dam. More significantly, it would have resulted in the over-topping and probable failure of the earthen walls of the 40-metre-high (130 ft) Hume Dam, 200 kilometres (120 mi) downriver on the Murray; and immediately upstream of the regional cities of Albury and Wodonga, and a much more intensively settled irrigation area.

The power station was re-built and recommissioned in 1993.

== Climate ==
Climate data for the region are sourced at the bottom of the dam wall, in a relatively sheltered spot at 370 metres (1,210 ft) above sea level, just outside the town of Dartmouth on Horsfall Rd. Rainfall records began in 1918. Temperature records began in 1975. Winter is twice as wet as summer, and occasionally it may snow.

The lake is some 120 metres (390 ft) higher than this site and more exposed, making it approximately a degree cooler in maxima and with higher rainfall.

Climate data for Dartmouth Reservoir (1975–2022, rainfall to 1918); 370 m AMSL; 36.54° S, 147.50° E
Month	Jan	Feb	Mar	Apr	May	Jun	Jul	Aug	Sep	Oct	Nov	Dec	Year
Record high °C (°F)	42.2 (108.0)	43.0 (109.4)	39.0 (102.2)	33.4 (92.1)	24.7 (76.5)	20.0 (68.0)	19.6 (67.3)	27.2 (81.0)	28.4 (83.1)	33.2 (91.8)	37.9 (100.2)	39.2 (102.6)	43.0 (109.4)
Mean daily maximum °C (°F)	29.5 (85.1)	29.0 (84.2)	25.8 (78.4)	20.7 (69.3)	15.9 (60.6)	12.5 (54.5)	11.8 (53.2)	13.4 (56.1)	16.6 (61.9)	20.5 (68.9)	24.0 (75.2)	26.9 (80.4)	20.6 (69.0)
Mean daily minimum °C (°F)	14.0 (57.2)	13.7 (56.7)	11.1 (52.0)	7.3 (45.1)	4.7 (40.5)	3.1 (37.6)	2.3 (36.1)	2.8 (37.0)	4.6 (40.3)	7.0 (44.6)	9.9 (49.8)	11.8 (53.2)	7.7 (45.8)
Record low °C (°F)	2.8 (37.0)	2.3 (36.1)	1.9 (35.4)	−1.6 (29.1)	−3.5 (25.7)	−5.0 (23.0)	−5.4 (22.3)	−5.0 (23.0)	−3.7 (25.3)	−1.5 (29.3)	−0.2 (31.6)	1.4 (34.5)	−5.4 (22.3)
Average precipitation mm (inches)	65.1 (2.56)	55.6 (2.19)	61.2 (2.41)	57.9 (2.28)	85.8 (3.38)	100.6 (3.96)	111.3 (4.38)	121.4 (4.78)	102.5 (4.04)	97.4 (3.83)	71.8 (2.83)	73.9 (2.91)	1,006.2 (39.61)
Average precipitation days (≥ 0.2 mm)	6.3	5.9	6.7	7.7	10.5	12.5	14.8	14.6	12.9	11.0	8.8	7.6	119.3
Source: Australian Bureau of Meteorology; Dartmouth Reservoir

== Gallery ==
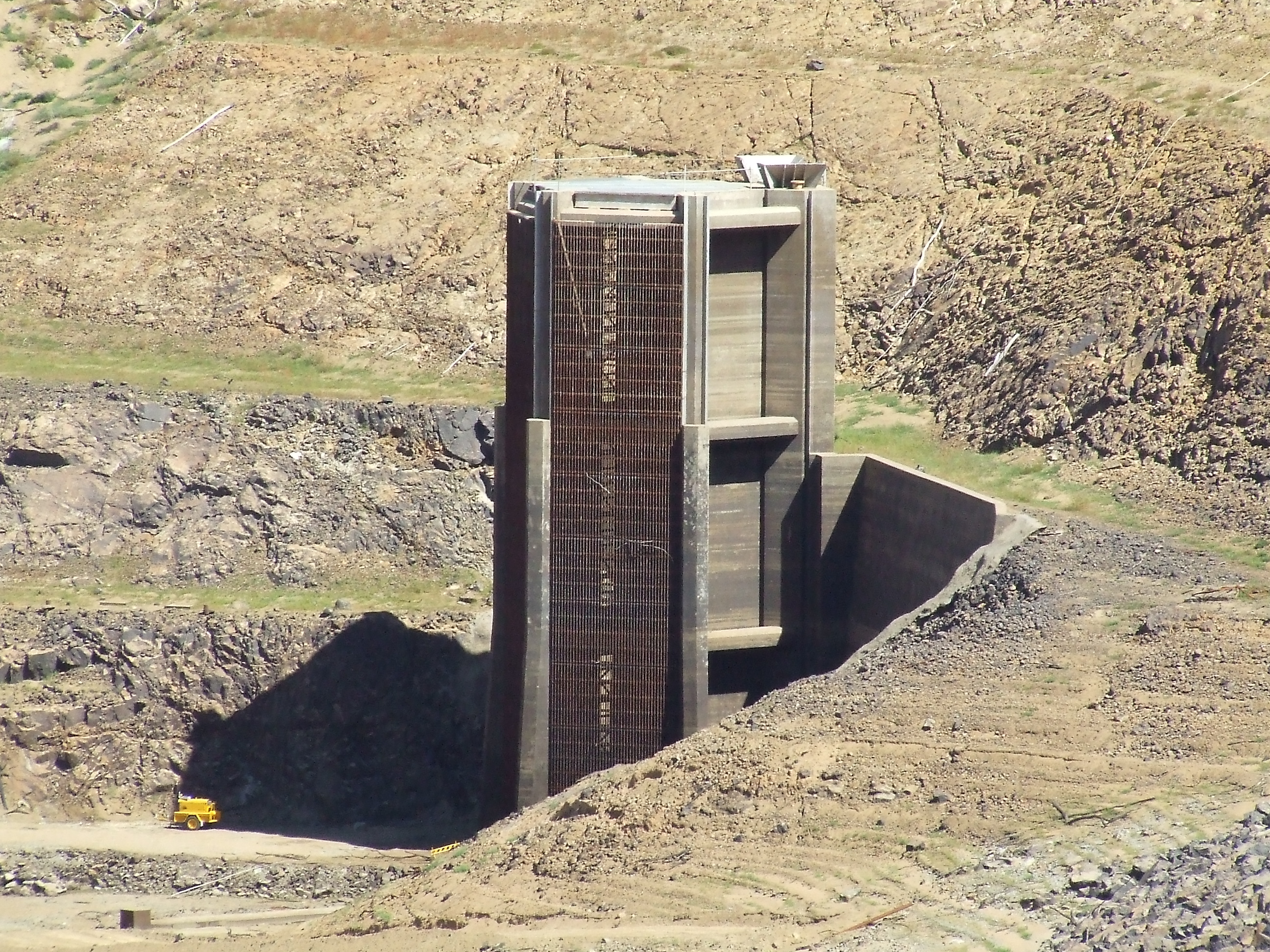
Upper intake tower exposed, 2007

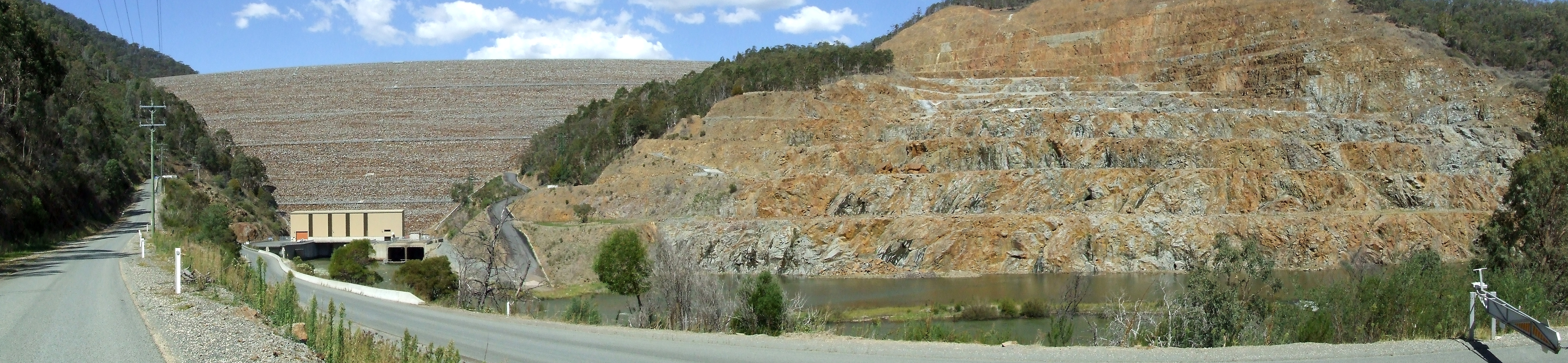
Power station, wall and spillway

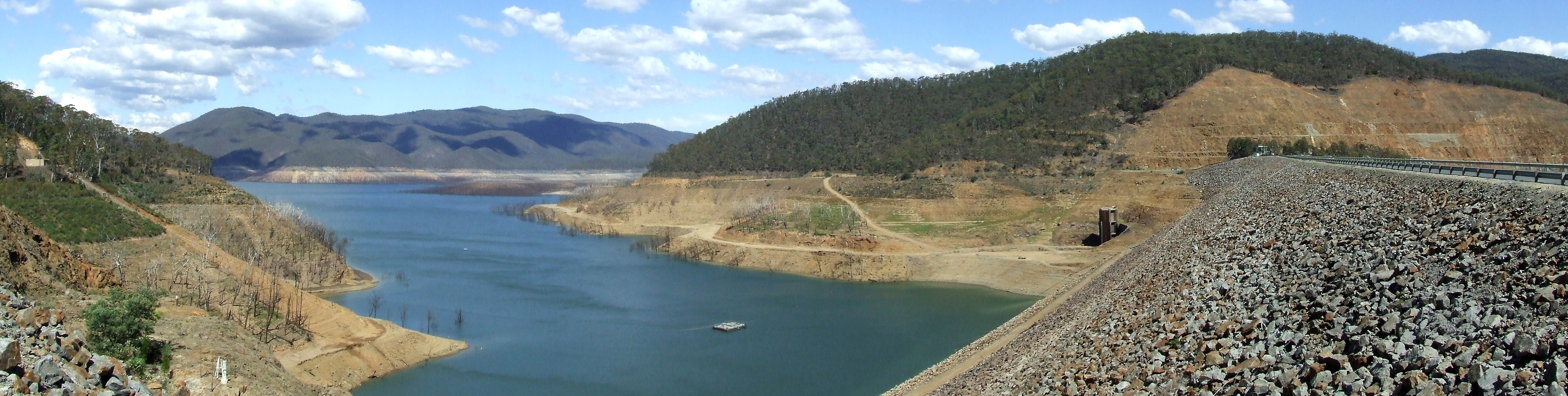
First sight of the reservoir

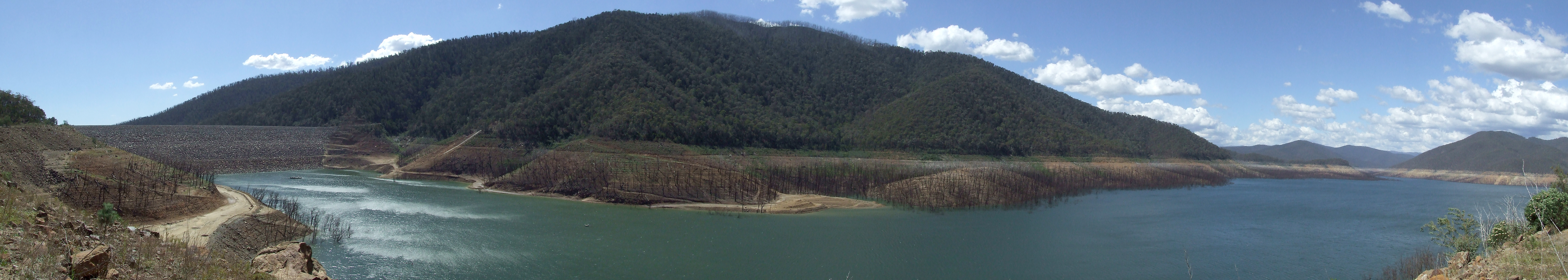
The shore opposite entrance point

== See also ==
- List of power stations in Victoria
- List of reservoirs and dams in Victoria
- Irrigation in Australia
