= Ben Paton (Australian footballer) =

Australian rules footballer (born 1998)

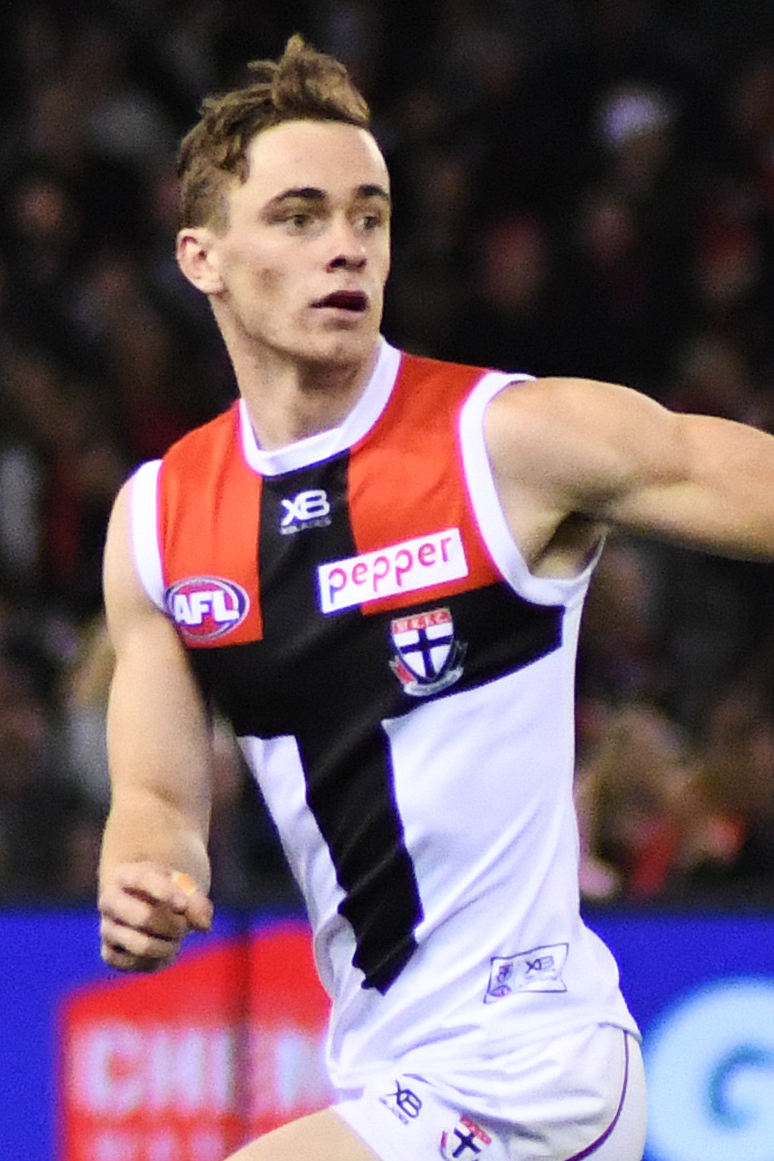
- Paton playing for St Kilda in August 2018

Personal information
- Nicknames: Pato, Lizard, Bumchin, Snake
- Born: 19 October 1998 (age 28); Tallangatta
- Original team: Mitta United (TDFL)
- Draft: No. 46, 2017 national draft
- Debut: 10 August 2018, St Kilda vs. Essendon, at Docklands Stadium
- Height: 186 cm (6 ft 1 in)
- Weight: 81 kg (179 lb)
- Position: Defender

Playing career
Years	Club	Games (Goals)
2018–2024	St Kilda	71 (4)
2025	Sydney	4 (0)
Total		75 (4)

Ben Paton (born 19 October 1998) is a former professional Australian rules footballer who played for St Kilda and Sydney in the Australian Football League (AFL).

== Junior career ==
Paton is from Tallangatta.

In 2015, he played 18 games in the Tallangatta & District Football League for Mitta United aged 16, winning their best and fairest.

Paton played for the Murray Bushrangers in the TAC Cup in 2016, and was in their losing grand final team. He also played for North Albury. Although eligible for the 2016 AFL draft, Paton was not invited to the AFL Draft Combine that year.

In 2017, he returned to the Bushrangers and moved from the midfield to defence. Paton played for Vic Country in the 2017 AFL Under 18 Championships and was selected in the All-Australian side. He played two games in the Victorian Football League (VFL) for Collingwood. Paton tested at the 2017 AFL Draft Combine, recording the second-best running vertical jump of 99 centimetres (39 in). He also recorded the third-best standing vertical jump of 80 centimetres (31 in) and the sixth-best 20 m (66 ft) sprint with a time of 2.95 seconds.

== AFL career ==
=== St Kilda ===
Paton was recruited by St Kilda with pick 46 in the 2017 national draft.

In 2018, Paton played for St Kilda's VFL affiliate Sandringham. He suffered a thumb injury in a practice match against the Northern Blues; he was expected to miss about six weeks. Paton was named as an emergency 10 times before he was selected in the senior side against Essendon in round 21. On debut, he kicked one goal from a set shot. Coach Alan Richardson praised Paton after the match for his speed and foot skills. He signed a one-year contract extension, keeping him at St Kilda until 2020, after playing the remaining two matches of the season.

Paton was delisted by St Kilda following the 2024 AFL season.

=== Sydney ===
Following his delisting at St Kilda, Paton was selected in the rookie draft by the Sydney Swans. He made his club debut for the Swans in their first game of the 2025 AFL season, a 20 point loss to Hawthorn.

Paton played four games for the season, before being delisted by the Swans.

== Personal life ==
Paton's father Steve played 190 games for North Albury and captained the club for six seasons.

== Statistics ==
Legend
G	Goals	K	Kicks	D	Disposals	T	Tackles
B	Behinds	H	Handballs	M	Marks

Season	Team	No.	Games	Totals							Averages (per game)							Votes
Season	Team	No.	Games	G	B	K	H	D	M	T	G	B	K	H	D	M	T	Votes
2018	St Kilda	45	3	3	2	19	17	36	6	5	1.0	0.7	6.3	5.7	12.0	2.0	1.7	0
2019	St Kilda	33	13	1	0	109	82	191	50	35	0.1	0.0	8.4	6.3	14.7	3.8	2.7	0
2020 (Note: The 2020 season was played with 17 home-and-away matches per team (down from 22) and 16-minute quarters with time on (down from 20-minute quarters with time on) due to the impact of the COVID-19 pandemic.)	St Kilda	33	19	0	0	145	92	237	82	20	0.0	0.0	7.6	4.8	12.5	4.3	1.1	0
2022	St Kilda	33	20	0	0	179	115	294	91	48	0.0	0.0	9.0	5.8	14.7	4.6	2.4	0
2023	St Kilda	33	12	0	0	92	70	162	53	18	0.0	0.0	7.7	5.8	13.5	4.4	1.5	0
2024	St Kilda	33	4	0	0	15	12	27	5	5	0.0	0.0	3.8	3.0	6.8	1.3	1.3	0
2025	Sydney	25	4	0	0	18	15	33	8	6	0.0	0.0	4.5	3.8	8.3	2.0	1.5	0
Career			75	4	2	577	403	980	295	137	0.1	0.0	7.7	5.4	13.1	3.9	1.8	0
