= Mount Loch =

Mountain in Victoria, Australia

- Location within Alpine Shire

Highest point
- Elevation: 1,887 metres (6,191 ft) AHD
- Coordinates: 36°57′26″S 147°09′23″E

Geography
- Location: Victoria, Australia
- Parent range: Victorian Alps, Great Dividing Range

Mount Loch is a mountain in the Victorian Alps of the Great Dividing Range, located in the Australian state of Victoria. The summit of Mount Loch is at 1,887 metres (6,191 ft) AHD and it is the fourth highest mountain in the state.

== See also ==
- Alpine National Park
- List of mountains in Australia § Victoria

== Sources ==
- "Mount Loch - Peakbagger.com". www.peakbagger.com.
