= Indian Creek (North Fork Cuivre River tributary) =

Stream in the American state of Missouri

Indian Creek is a stream in Pike County of northeastern Missouri. It is a tributary of North Fork Cuivre River.

The stream source is at 39°20′42″N 91°23′00″W and the confluence is at 39°10′06″N 91°11′06″W.

Indian Creek was so named for the fact mound-building Indians once settled the area.

== See also ==
- List of rivers of Missouri
