= Mitta Mitta River =

Mitta Mitta
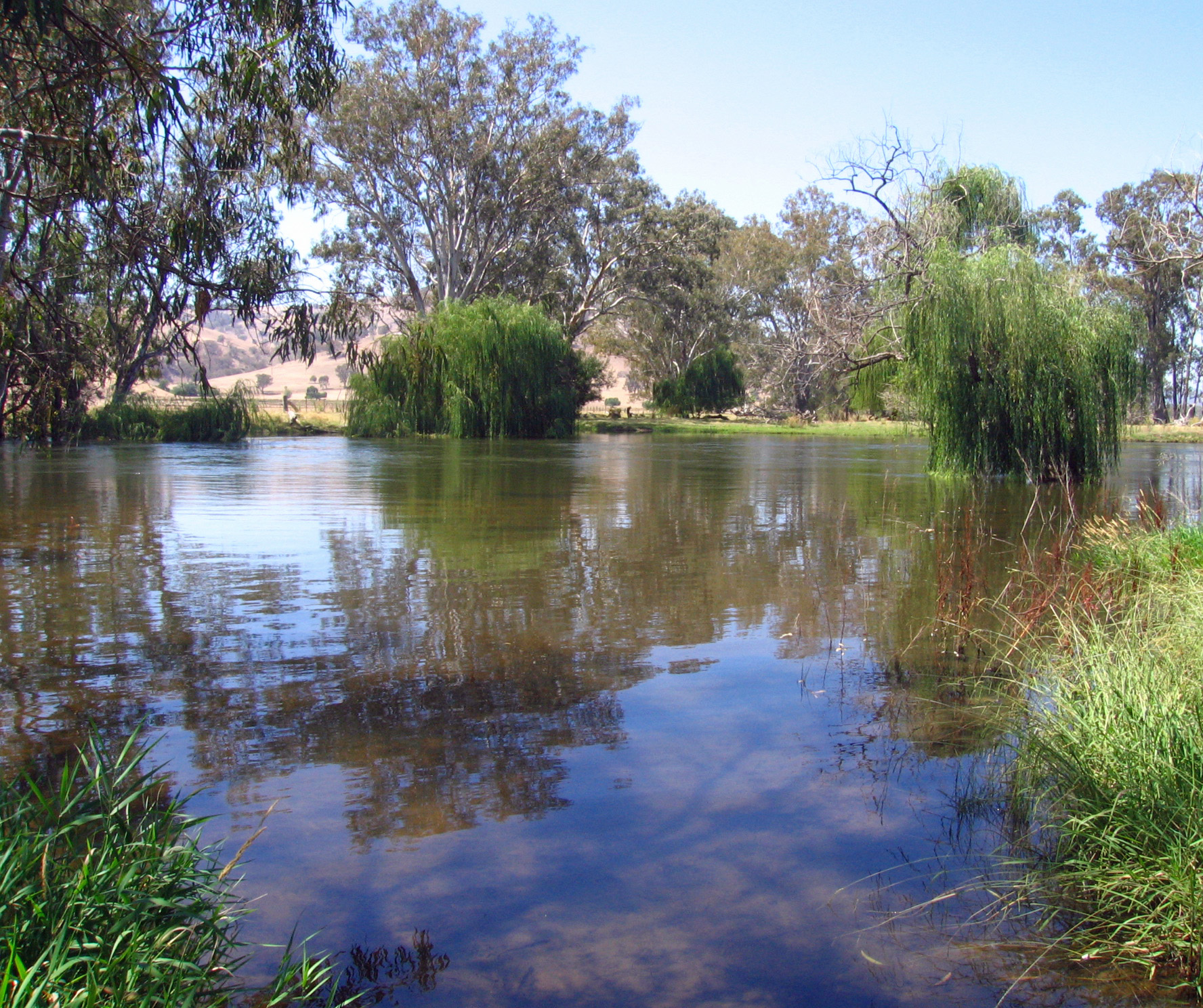
- The river, downstream from Dartmouth Dam, 2007

- Location of the river mouth at Lake Hume in Victoria
- Etymology: Aboriginal: from reeds called modunga
- Native name: Mida-modoenga

Location
- Country: Australia
- State: Victoria
- Region: Australian Alps (IBRA), Victorian Alps
- Local government area: Towong

Physical characteristics
- Source confluence: Cobungra River and Big River
  - location: near Anglers Rest
  - coordinates: 36°59′22″S 147°30′41″E
  - elevation: 694 m (2,277 ft)
- Mouth: confluence with the Murray River
  - location: Mitta Junction, Lake Hume
  - coordinates: 36°07′1″S 147°2′30″E
  - elevation: 180 m (590 ft)
- Length: 204 km (127 mi)
- Basin size: 10,062 km^{2} (3,885 sq mi)
- Discharge
  - average: 76 m^{3}/s (2,700 cu ft/s)

Basin features
- River system: North-east Murray catchment, Murray–Darling basin
- Tributaries
  - right: Dart
- Reservoirs: Dartmouth; Banimboola; Hume

The Mitta Mitta River is a perennial river and a direct tributary of the Murray River within the Murray–Darling basin, located in the Alpine district of Victoria, Australia.

The name Mitta Mitta derives from the Aboriginal word mida-modoenga, meaning reeds called modunga.

== Course ==
The river rises below Mount Bogong, the highest mountain in the Victorian Alps, with the Mitta Mitta River forming at the confluence of the Cobungra River and the Big River, just south of Anglers Rest, flowing generally north, joined by twenty-four minor tributaries including the Dart River, before reaching its mouth with the Murray River, east of Albury at Lake Hume. The river descends 514 metres (1,686 ft) over its course of 204 kilometres (127 mi).

The Mitta Mitta River is the source of approximately 10% of the Murray's flow. Along the Mitta Mitta River, mean annual flow can triple from Hinnomunjie in the south to Tallangatta in the north. Highest flows are in October and are attributable to the spring snow melt. The flow of the Mitta Mitta River is heavily modified and impounded by Dartmouth Dam and Hume Dam, both major water reservoirs. Upstream of Dartmouth Dam, the river flows swiftly through near-pristine forest. Below the dam, it travels more sedately through flatter, cleared farming country. The original junction of the Mitta Mitta River with the Murray River is now submerged beneath the waters of Lake Hume for a large part of the time.

The catchment area of the Mitta Mitta River is estimated as 10,062 square kilometres (3,885 sq mi).

The river valley used to flood on a nearly annual basis, but the completion of Dartmouth Dam in the 1970s largely eliminated the floods.

The river flows through a valley that contains four small towns: Mitta Mitta, Eskdale, Dartmouth. Mitta Mitta is a small hamlet at the confluence of the River and Snowy Creek.

== Recreation ==
For fisher folk, the Mitta Mitta River is a good source for trout, particularly brown trout and the occasional rainbow trout.

The Mitta Mitta River upstream of Hinnomunjie Bridge is a favourite for white water enthusiasts, with one licensed company operating commercial facilities. The river is also frequented by recreational kayakers as a single or multi day trip with a grade between II and IV.

== Gallery ==
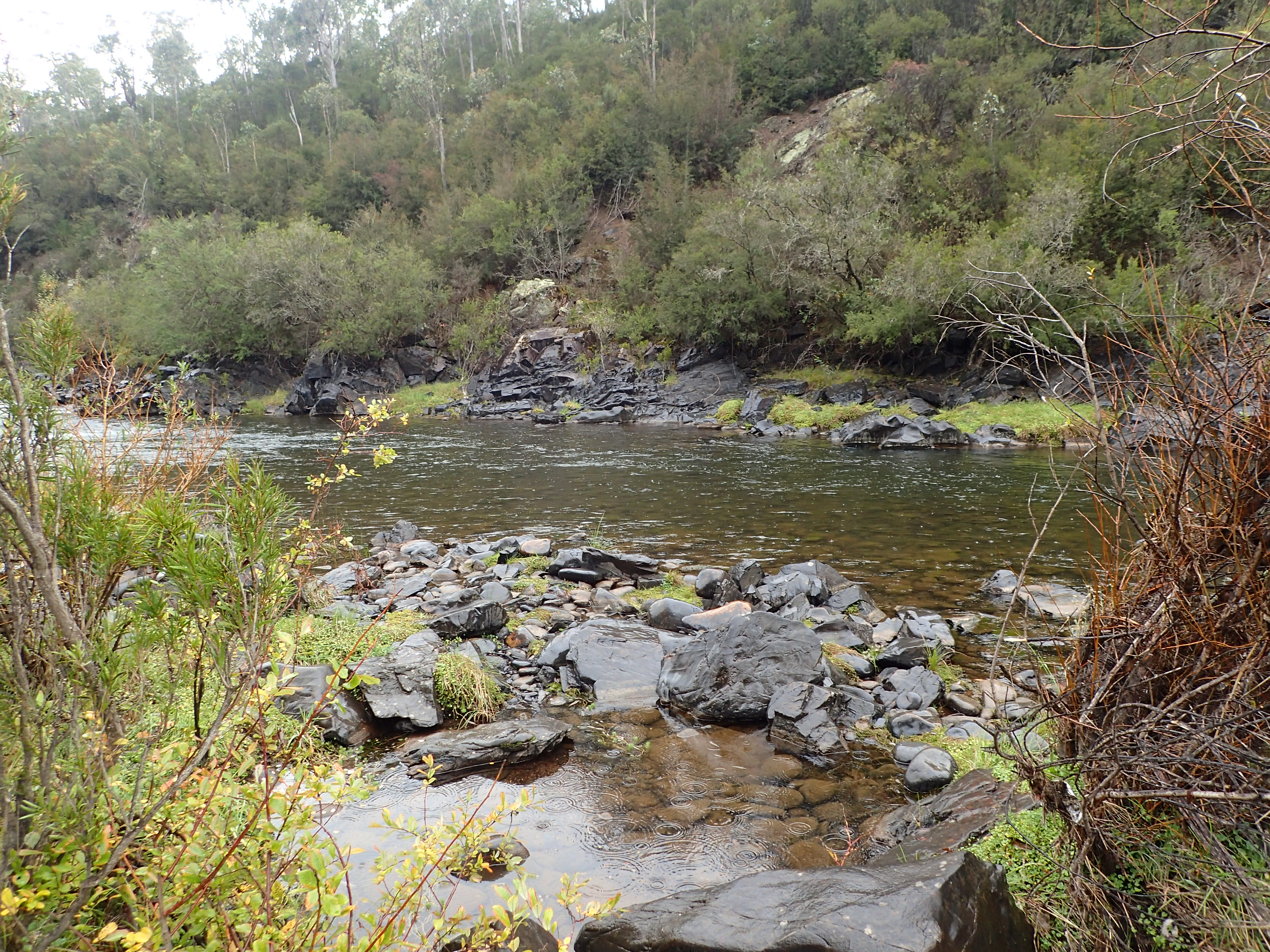
Mitta Mitta in gorge below Dartmouth dam

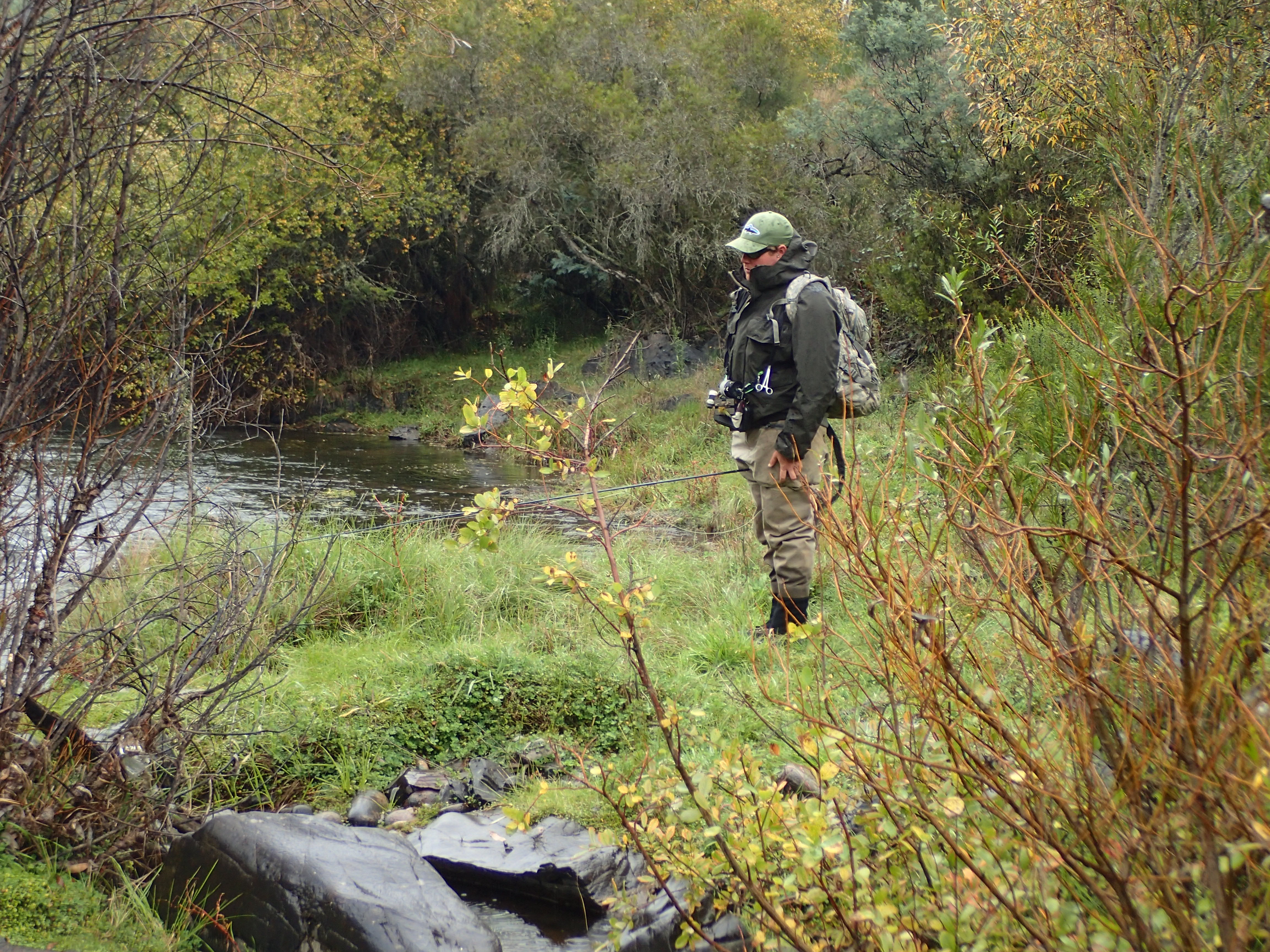
Fly fishing the Mitta Mitta

== See also ==
- List of rivers of Australia § Victoria
