= Mitta Mitta, Victoria =

Mitta Mitta
- Town
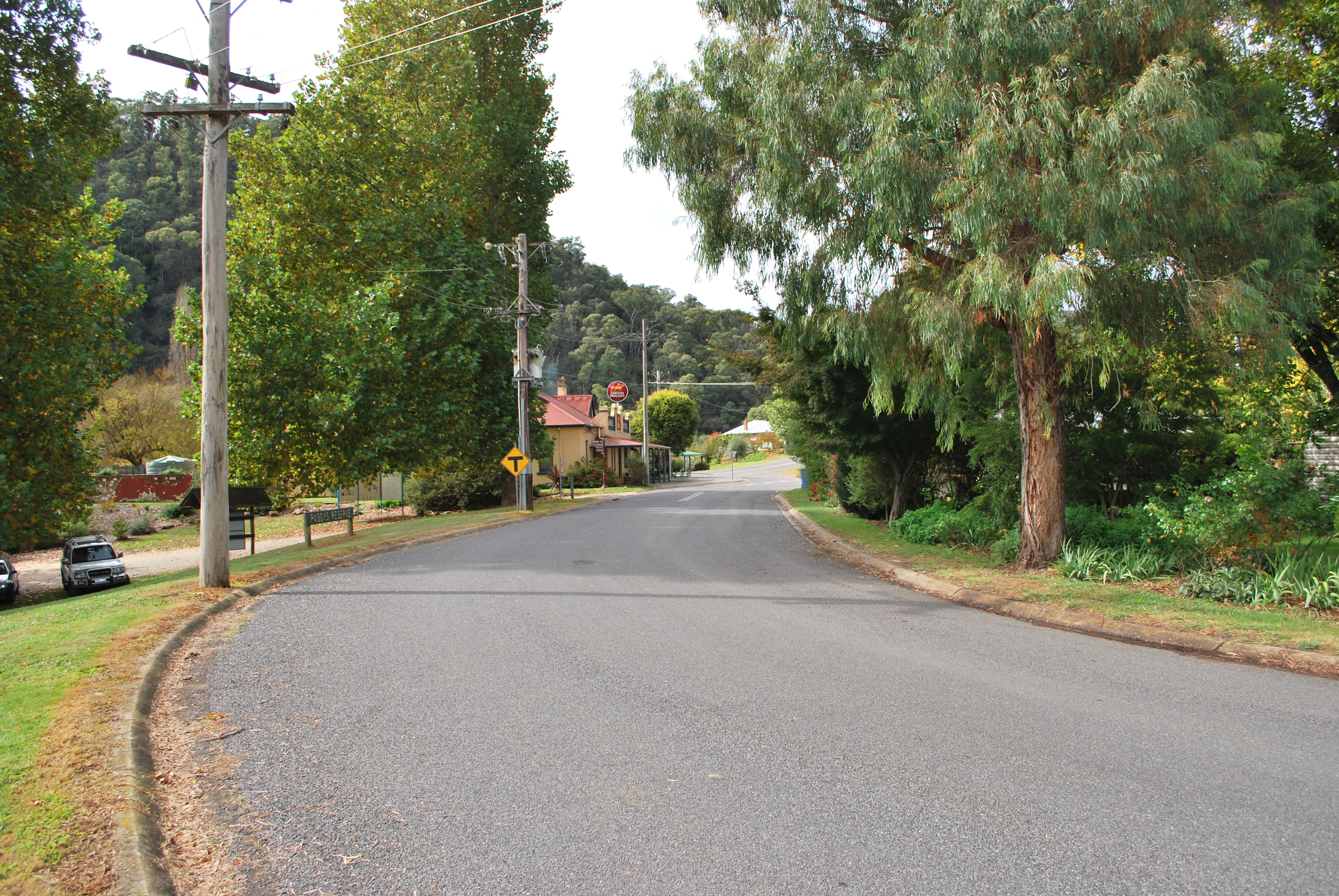
- Mitta Mitta

- Interactive map of Mitta Mitta
- Coordinates: 36°32′S 147°22′E
- Country: Australia
- State: Victoria
- Region: Hume
- LGA: Shire of Towong
- Location: 415 km (258 mi) NE of Melbourne; 93 km (58 mi) SE of Wodonga; 73 km (45 mi) SE of Tallangatta

Government
  - State electorate: Benambra
  - Federal division: Indi
- Elevation: 254 m (833 ft)

Population
  - Total: 171 (2021 census)
- Postcode: 3701
- Mean max temp: 20.5 °C (68.9 °F)
- Mean min temp: 6.3 °C (43.3 °F)
- Annual rainfall: 1,045.8 mm (41.17 in)

Mitta Mitta is a town in the Australian state of Victoria in the Mitta Mitta Valley. It stands on the Omeo Highway and is 415 km from Melbourne (and the same distance from Canberra), and is located on the Mitta Mitta River not far from Dartmouth Dam. At the 2021 census, Mitta Mitta and the surrounding area had a population of 171.

== Etymology ==
The name "Mitta Mitta" derives from the name local Aboriginal people gave to the Mitta Mitta River – "mida-modunga" (where reeds grow, modunga being a particular type of reed).

== History ==
The Mitta Mitta Valley was settled by early pastoralists in 1835 and Mitta Mitta became a settlement when gold was discovered there in 1852. Substantial hydraulic sluicing replaced alluvial mining, the Pioneer Mine being the most successful, yielding over 441 kg of gold until it closed in 1904. This large open-cut mine still forms the backdrop to the town. Aboriginals used the River as a food source, social connections and sometimes wars. Their presence goes back at least 4,000 years and artifacts are frequently found along the River and creeks. The principle tribe in the district was the Jaitmatang (also spelt Yaithmathang) with the theddora-mittung occupying the area around the southern end of the Valley near present Mitta Mitta. Their spoken language was Dhudhoroa Language, no longer spoken but being revived in some local primary schools.

== Economy ==
Mining, cropping and cattle provided income until the Federation Drought. Dairy farming was a major pursuit until around 2000 and since then, beef cattle production has since become the principal activity with the Mitta Valley offering some the finest and productive country in the State. Some niche agri-business enterprises are appearing, namely the production of hazelnuts and mushrooms. The town was seriously compromised during the 2003 bushfires and was shut down in 2020 during the January bushfires and subsequent COVID-19 lockdown until early 2022. Mitta is fast developing into a tourist mecca that provides an opportunity for economic and population growth to offset some of the pressures from a falling permanent population and a decline in local dairy production. A mountain bike precinct is being developed that will further accelerate the town's importance as a visitor destination, although there are concerns that the infrastructure (especially a portable water supply and sewerage) is insufficient to sustain this development. Houses within the township are more frequently being acquired as 'weekenders', indicating the desirability of Mitta Mitta as a beautiful and peaceful retreat.

== Geography ==
Mitta Mitta is situated at the southernmost end of the intermontane Mitta Mitta Valley on the foothills of the Great Dividing Range. At the airport, Mitta Mitta is 250 m (820 ft) above mean sea level. The town is at the confluence of the Mitta Mitta River and Snowy Creek, 18 km from Mount Bogong, the highest mountain in Victoria. The hamlet sits between Mt Welcome (883 m) and Mt Misery (721 m). Mitta Mitta is on the Omeo Highway, a major transportation connection between Northern Victoria and Gippsland. Prior to the completion of the Dartmouth Dam in 1979, the valley was subjected to frequent flooding. The floral emblem of Mitta Mitta is the Mitta Wattle (acacia dawsonii), also known as the poverty wattle and is to be found close to the town on the Omeo Highway and Dartmouth Road.

== Climate ==
Mitta Mitta has an oceanic climate (Köppen Cfb) with warm, sunny summers that are cool by nightfall. Winters are damp and rainy followed by cool springs with a strong seasonal lag. Average rainfall is 1,046 millimetres (41.2 in), with July and August the wettest months and February the driest.

Climate data for Mitta Mitta (1953–1972, rainfall 1953–2022); 320 m AMSL; 36.53° S, 147.37° E
Month	Jan	Feb	Mar	Apr	May	Jun	Jul	Aug	Sep	Oct	Nov	Dec	Year
Record high °C (°F)	43.3 (109.9)	42.8 (109.0)	37.2 (99.0)	31.7 (89.1)	23.9 (75.0)	18.3 (64.9)	17.8 (64.0)	20.3 (68.5)	24.4 (75.9)	28.3 (82.9)	35.0 (95.0)	35.6 (96.1)	43.3 (109.9)
Mean daily maximum °C (°F)	30.0 (86.0)	30.2 (86.4)	27.0 (80.6)	20.5 (68.9)	15.0 (59.0)	11.8 (53.2)	11.5 (52.7)	12.8 (55.0)	15.8 (60.4)	22.2 (72.0)	22.8 (73.0)	26.8 (80.2)	20.5 (69.0)
Mean daily minimum °C (°F)	11.4 (52.5)	12.4 (54.3)	8.5 (47.3)	6.2 (43.2)	4.1 (39.4)	1.4 (34.5)	1.1 (34.0)	2.5 (36.5)	3.2 (37.8)	7.1 (44.8)	8.5 (47.3)	9.1 (48.4)	6.3 (43.3)
Record low °C (°F)	3.9 (39.0)	3.9 (39.0)	0.0 (32.0)	−2.8 (27.0)	−4.2 (24.4)	−6.1 (21.0)	−5.6 (21.9)	−3.9 (25.0)	−3.9 (25.0)	−2.8 (27.0)	−1.4 (29.5)	1.9 (35.4)	−6.1 (21.0)
Average precipitation mm (inches)	64.8 (2.55)	53.0 (2.09)	62.6 (2.46)	64.9 (2.56)	96.9 (3.81)	96.3 (3.79)	122.4 (4.82)	124.9 (4.92)	103.3 (4.07)	97.8 (3.85)	83.2 (3.28)	73.0 (2.87)	1,045.8 (41.17)
Average precipitation days (≥ 0.2 mm)	6.6	5.9	6.7	7.6	10.9	11.6	14.7	15.3	12.6	11.7	9.6	7.9	121.0
Source: Australian Bureau of Meteorology; Mitta Mitta

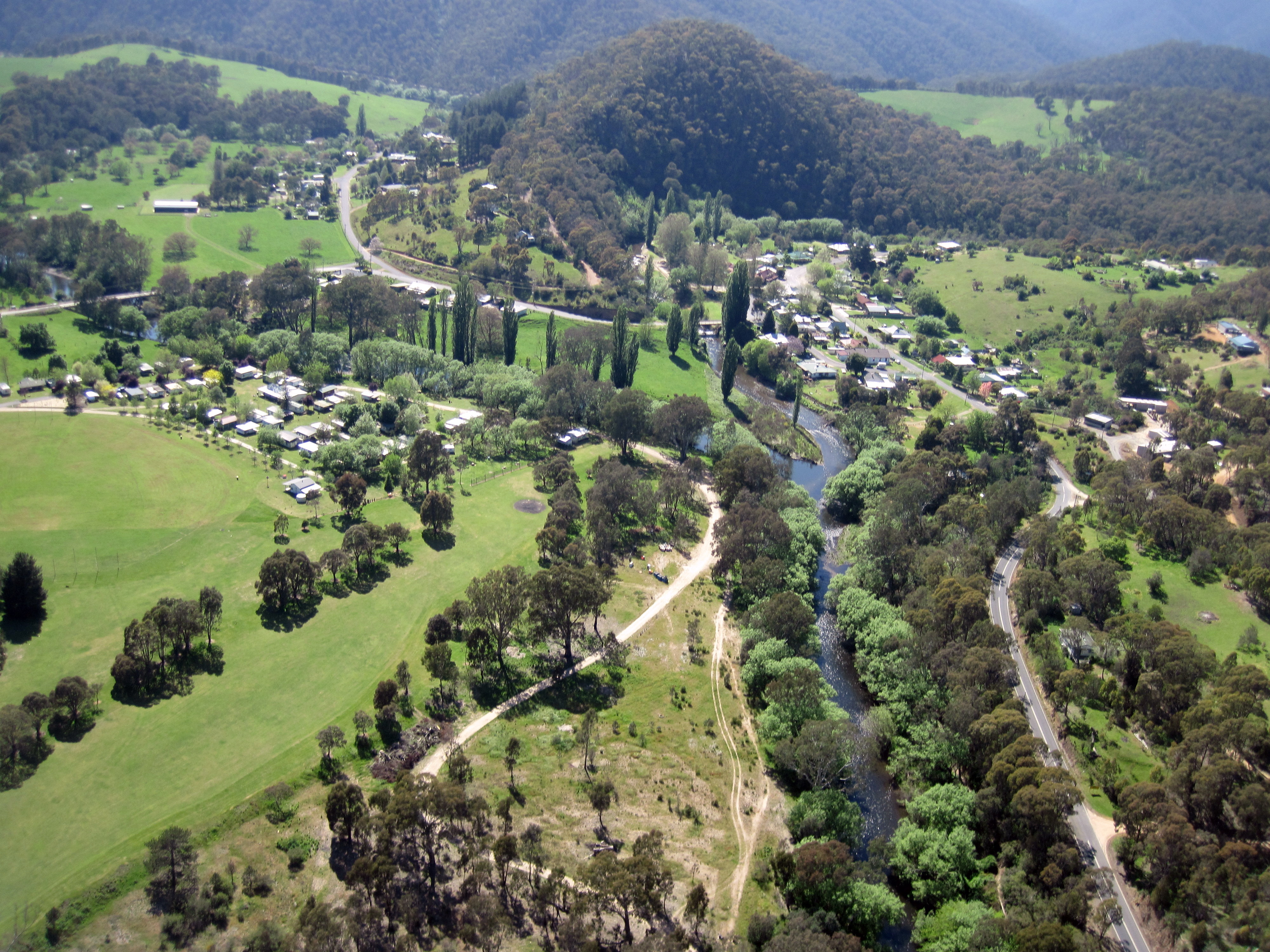
The hamlet of Mitta Mitta

== Education ==
Mitta Mitta Primary School (no 887) was opened on 1 October 1869. It is a small school that has been threatened with closure a number of times. Children rode horses to the school until the 1980s. Secondary children are bussed to Tallangatta, a 140 km daily round trip. In 2023, Mitta Mitta Primary had 15 students enrolled, up from a 2014 low of just four.

== Population ==
The 2021 Census provides the following data for Mitta Mitta and surrounds:

   Median age was 56
   56% are married, 26% never married
   20% have bachelor's degree Level and above
   81% born in Australia
   52% no religion, 17% Catholic, 7% Anglican

In 2016, there were around 45 full-time residents in the hamlet. The 2016 Census provides the following data for Mitta Mitta and surrounds (including farming communities, population 171):

   Median age was 52
   48% are married, 35% never married
   22% have bachelor's degree Level and above
   67% born in Australia
   30% no religion, 23% Catholic, 13% Anglican
   83% with internet access from home

== Governance ==
In local government, the Mitta Valley is covered by the Shire of Towong with the local seat of government at Tallangatta. In state politics, Mitta Mitta is located in the Legislative Assembly district of Benambra. In federal politics, Mitta Mitta is located in a single House of Representatives division—the Division of Indi.

== Transportation & Communications ==
Mitta Mitta Airport (privately owned) provides access to the town for Air Ambulance, flight training, fire fighting, agriculture services and visitors. A daily freight service operates between Albury/Wodonga and Mitta Mitta. A community-funded television translator situated on Mt Sugarloaf relays free-to-air programs from Albury. Telstra provides 4G mobile phone coverage to the town and a CB repeater on Channel 1 offers a safety and emergency service.

== Community ==
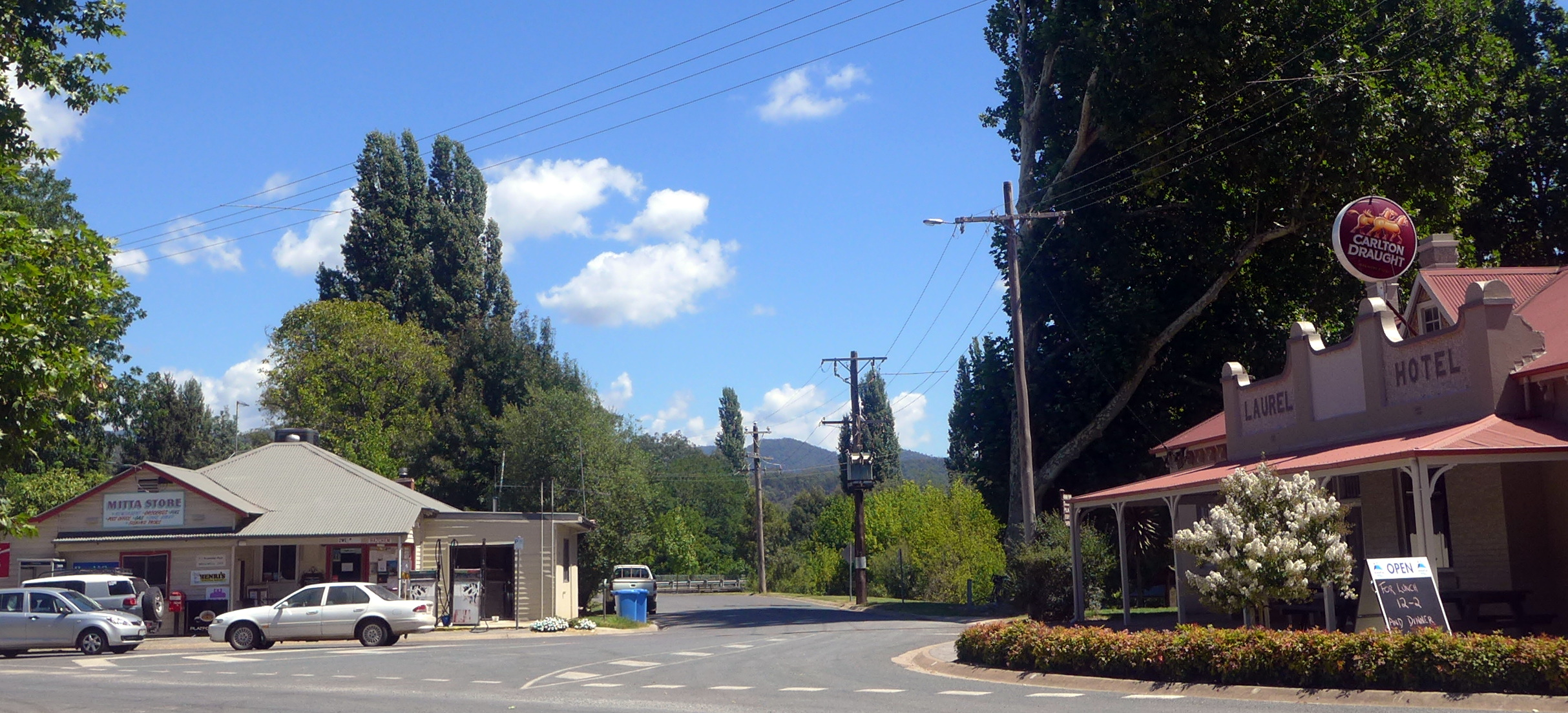
The general store and pub of Mitta Mitta.

The Mitta Valley has a strong culture of volunteerism with the 2021 Census indicating that 35% of the population volunteer through an organisation. The town operates a Country Fire Authority (CFA) branch together with a local State Emergency Service (SES) branch. Locally trained Ambulance Community Officers (ACOs) service an area of 2500 km^{2} on a 24/7 basis on behalf of Ambulance Victoria. There is a Victoria Police Station in the centre of the town.

The major annual event is the Mighty Mitta Muster held on the long weekend in March and is conducted by local volunteers.

The town in conjunction with neighbouring township Eskdale has an Australian Rules football team "Mitta United" competing in the Tallangatta & District Football League.

Golfers play at the course of the Mitta Mitta Golf Club on Magorra Park.

== See also ==
- List of reduplicated Australian place names
