= Cassilis, Victoria =

Cassilis Victoria
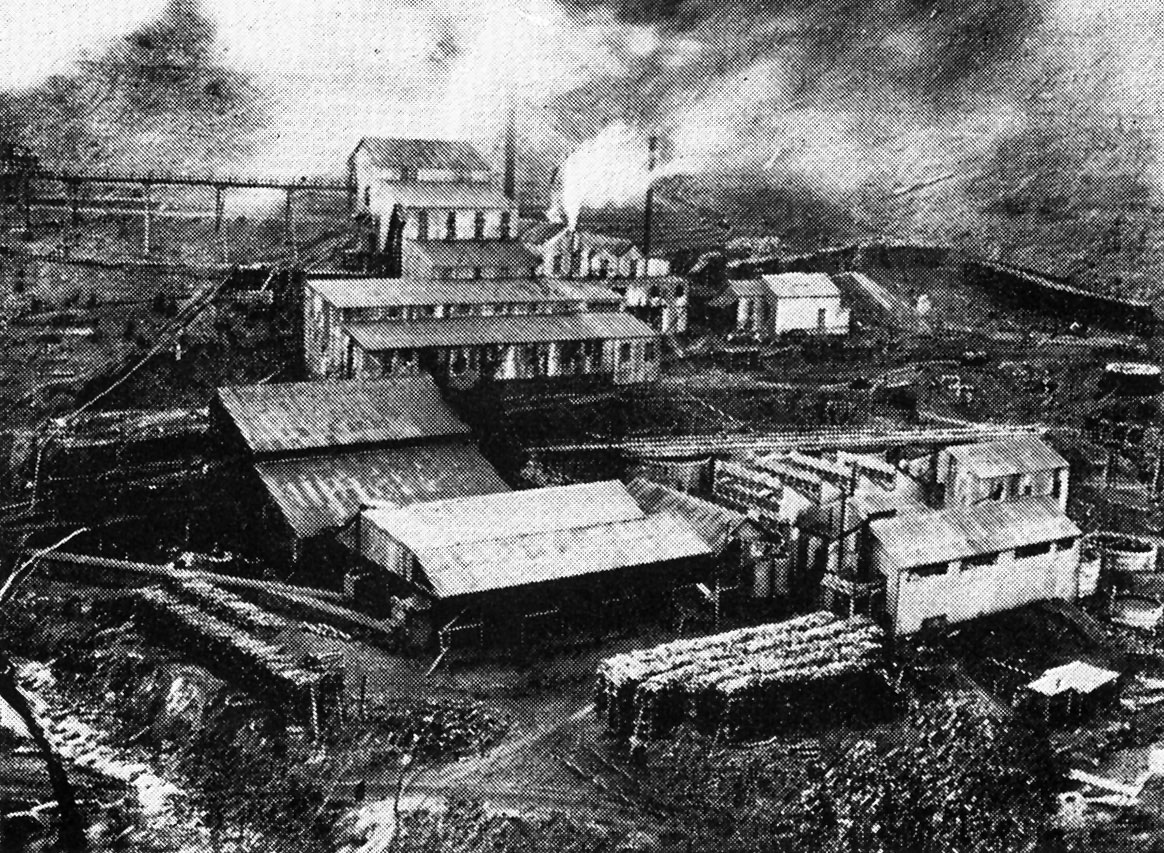
- Cassilis Mine, circa 1900

- Coordinates: 37°13′0″S 147°36′0″E
- Population: 29 (2016 census)
- Postcode(s): 3898
- Location: 391 km (243 mi) E of Melbourne; 110 km (68 mi) N of Bairnsdale; 17 km (11 mi) S of Omeo; 12 km (7 mi) NW of Swifts Creek
- LGA(s): Shire of East Gippsland
- State electorate(s): Gippsland East
- Federal division(s): Gippsland

Cassilis is a locality in the Shire of East Gippsland, Victoria, Australia. It was named after a district and castle in Ayrshire, Scotland. In the late 19th century, at the peak of the gold boom, it was a thriving mining centre and home to more than 500 people.

== History ==
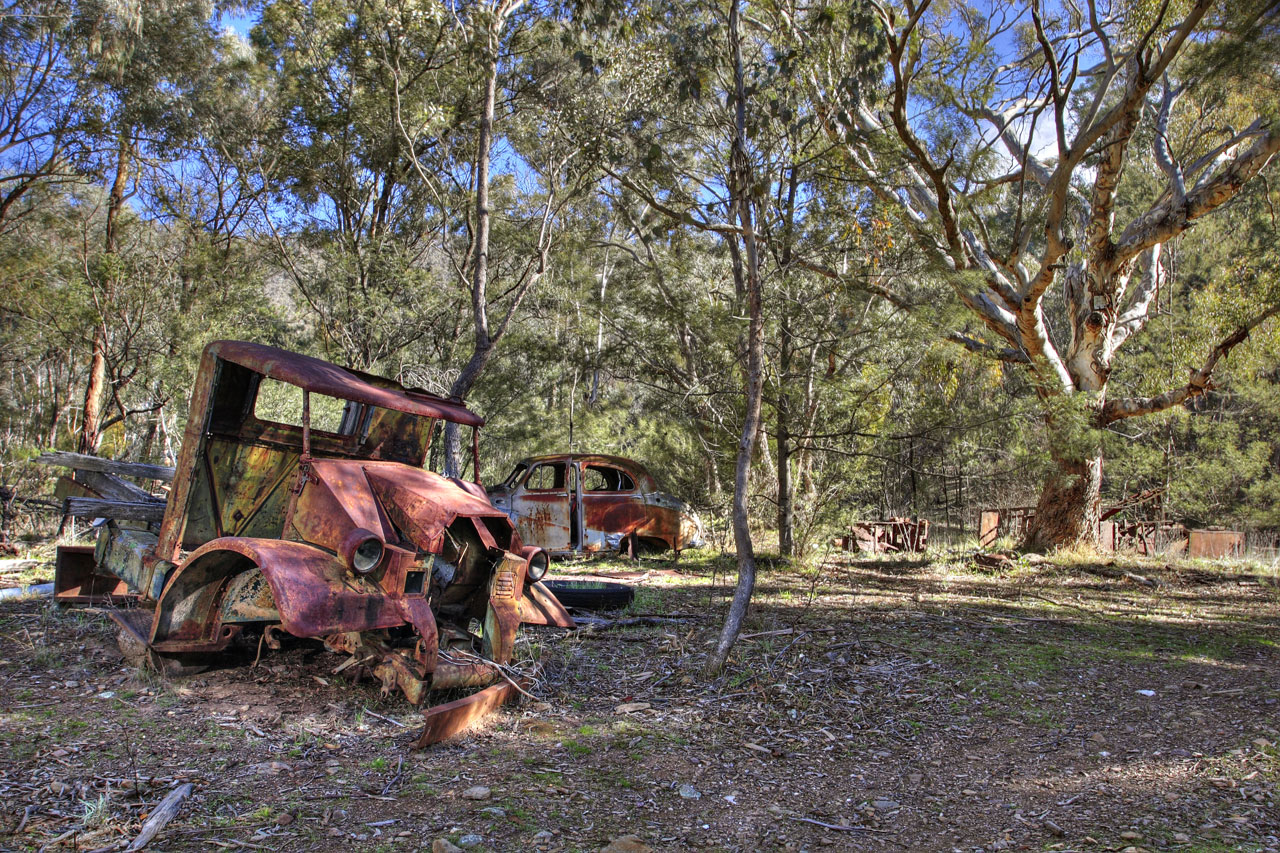
Remains of old automobiles in Cassilis

The Post Office opened on 7 October 1879 and closed in 1950.

Gold-bearing quartz reefs were discovered in 1885 at Long Gully, and by 1889 there was a battery in operation as well as a general store, butchery, bakery and Mechanics' Institute hall. A private school had already been operating when a government school commenced in the hall in 1890. The schools produced exceptional results, with pupils under headmaster McDonald gaining the highest percentage of scholarships in the State for several years. Two hotels, a coffee palace, hairdressers, bookmakers, two bank agencies and two post offices were also in existence. The first hydroelectric power station in Victoria was established at Victoria Falls to provide power and light for the mine.

Of the reef mines, the Mt Hepburn and King Cassilis were the largest. The Mt Hepburn mine was an immense formation nearly a kilometre in length and as much as 15 metres wide. However the ore obtained was heavily mineralized, and gold was lost due to the lack of a smelting plant. An extensive cyanide plant was constructed at King Cassilis mine about 1896, but was not a great success.

By the First World War, most of the available gold was depleted, and both mines closed down. The town rapidly declined and by 1933 there were only 34 inhabitants. The 1939 bushfires destroyed part of the town, and other buildings were taken away. Now Cassilis lies as a ghost town, with no commercial buildings in operation. Set in the 3,600-hectare Cassilis Historical Area, the mines are now a local tourist attraction with many relics of the gold mining era.

As of 2010, the population of Cassilis is growing due to the subdivision of farming land into rural allotments. There is a small winery, (Mt. Markey) on the former wine palace site in the centre of town. It produces wine, mead, cider and beer and has a cellar door for free tastings. More cider apples are being planted to expand the product range. Most of this produce is sold locally or at east Gippsland craft and farmers markets.
