= Swifts Creek =

- Town
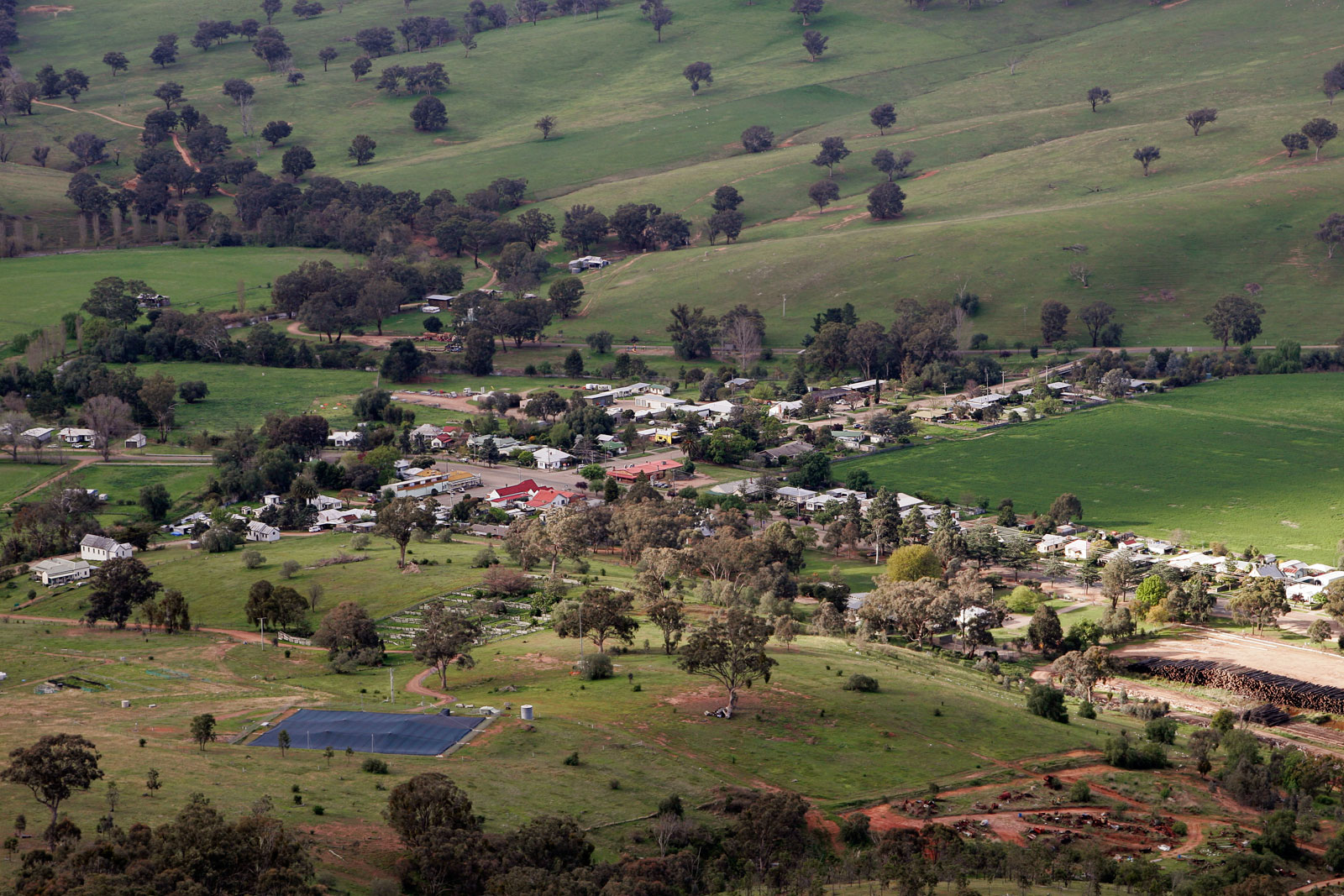

- Interactive map of Swifts Creek
- Coordinates: 37°15′01″S 147°42′44″E
- Country: Australia
- State: Victoria
- LGA: Shire of East Gippsland
- Location: 379 km (235 mi) E of Melbourne; 98 km (61 mi) N of Bairnsdale; 28 km (17 mi) S of Omeo

Government
  - State electorate: Gippsland East
  - Federal division: Gippsland
- Elevation: 300 m (980 ft)

Population
  - Total: 221 (2021 census)
- Postcode: 3896

Swifts Creek is a town in the Tambo Valley of East Gippsland, Victoria, Australia. The town is on the Great Alpine Road between Omeo and Ensay, 379 kilometres (235 mi) east of the state capital Melbourne and 300 metres (980 ft) above sea level. The area was originally settled by Europeans in the gold rushes of the mid-1800s. At the 2011 census, Swifts Creek and the surrounding area had a population of 419, with a median age of 47.

== History ==
The Aboriginal name for the site of Swifts Creek was Bun Jirrah Gingee Munjie, which translates as 'big kangaroos go to that place'. True to this name, mobs of large eastern grey kangaroos still frequent the town, especially at night when they are often seen feeding by the roadside, and on the local football ground and primary school oval.

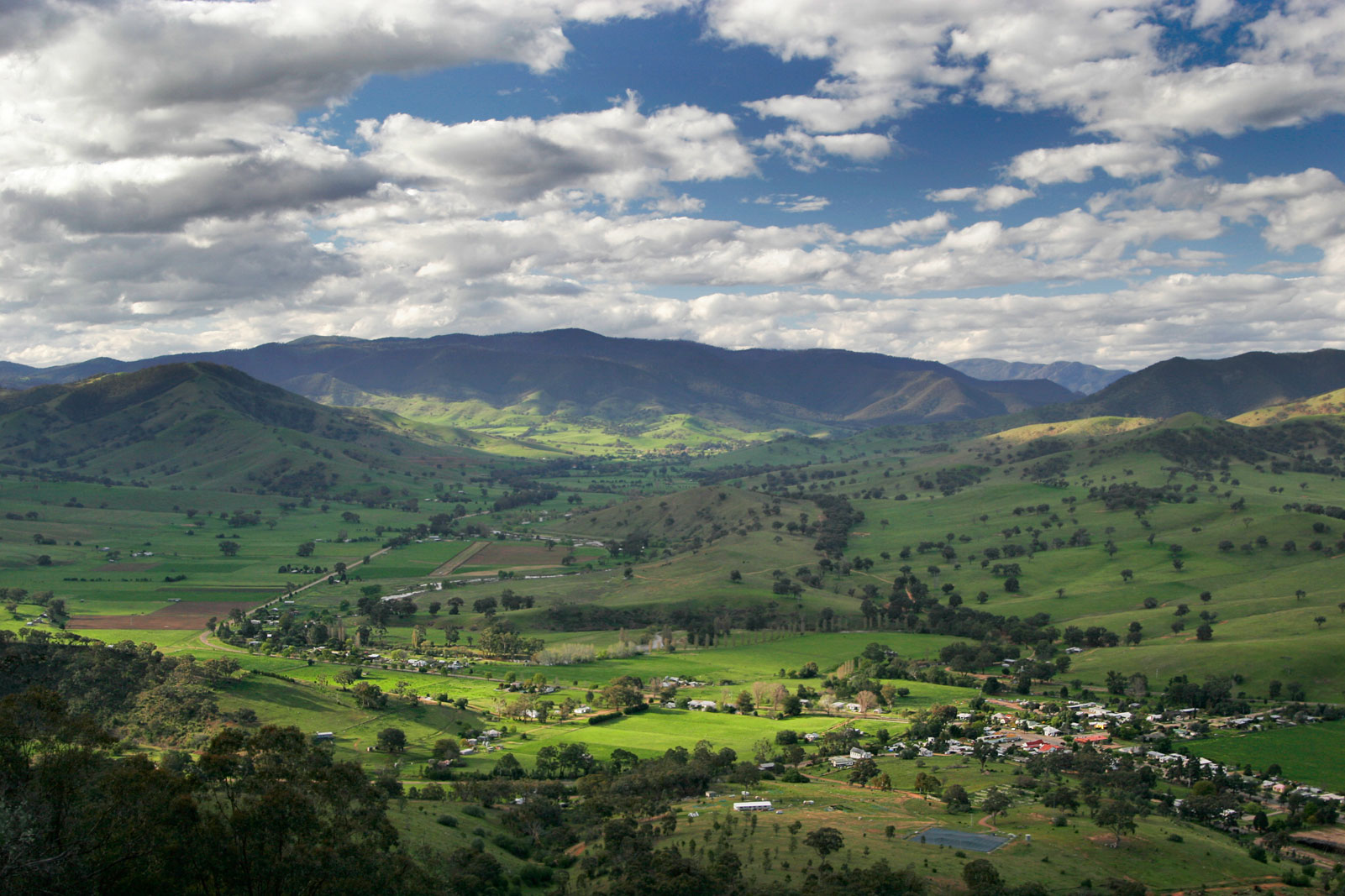
Swifts Creek (lower right) and surrounding hills, looking north

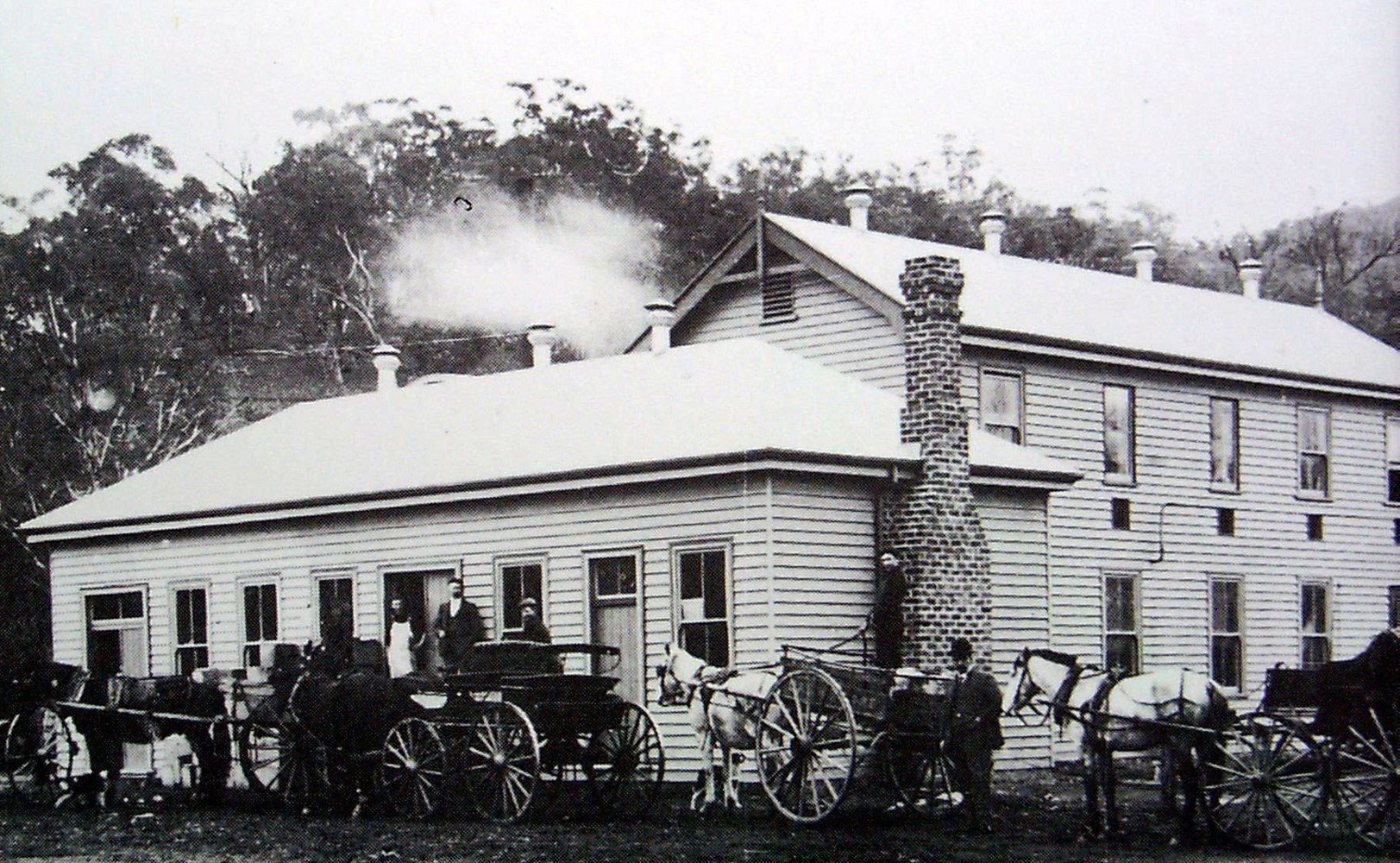
The Swifts Creek Butter Factory, c1910, shortly after its opening (refer to text)

The town of Swifts Creek is located at the confluence of Swifts Creek and the Tambo River. The creek was reputedly named after an otherwise unknown gold prospector named Swift who worked the creek panning for alluvial gold in the 1850s. The townsite itself was originally known as "Swifts Creek Junction", as it was at the road junction alongside Swifts Creek. Swift's Creek Post Office opened on 1 January 1867 and closed in 1879. Swift's Creek Junction Post Office opened on 1 May 1874 and was renamed Swift's Creek in 1926.

In the 1870s McLarty's Junction Hotel was established, and a small town with stores, service facilities, and a butter factory slowly grew up around the site.

The butter factory was constructed in 1907 and eventually produced 50 tonnes per annum, with the majority being sent for sale in Melbourne. Due to unreliable seasons, the factory eventually closed down in 1946. The building is no longer in existence, however Factory Lane just past the creek at the northern end of town marks its former location.

A flour mill was also planned, but was instead installed in the nearby town of Ensay in 1913. These factories were constructed as a result of local demand for flour, milk, butter and cream. The cost of transporting goods was high as wagons from the nearest large town of Bairnsdale took a week in good weather to travel the distance (now approximately an hour by car). Around this time, Jack (John Arthur) Ezard built the Swifts Creek sawmill, which provided the stable economy the town needed to move on from its gold mining beginnings. His son Ian inherited the mill when Jack retired. In contrast, the surrounding towns of Cassilis and Tongio West collapsed, as the area lost its potential for gold mining.

== Industry ==
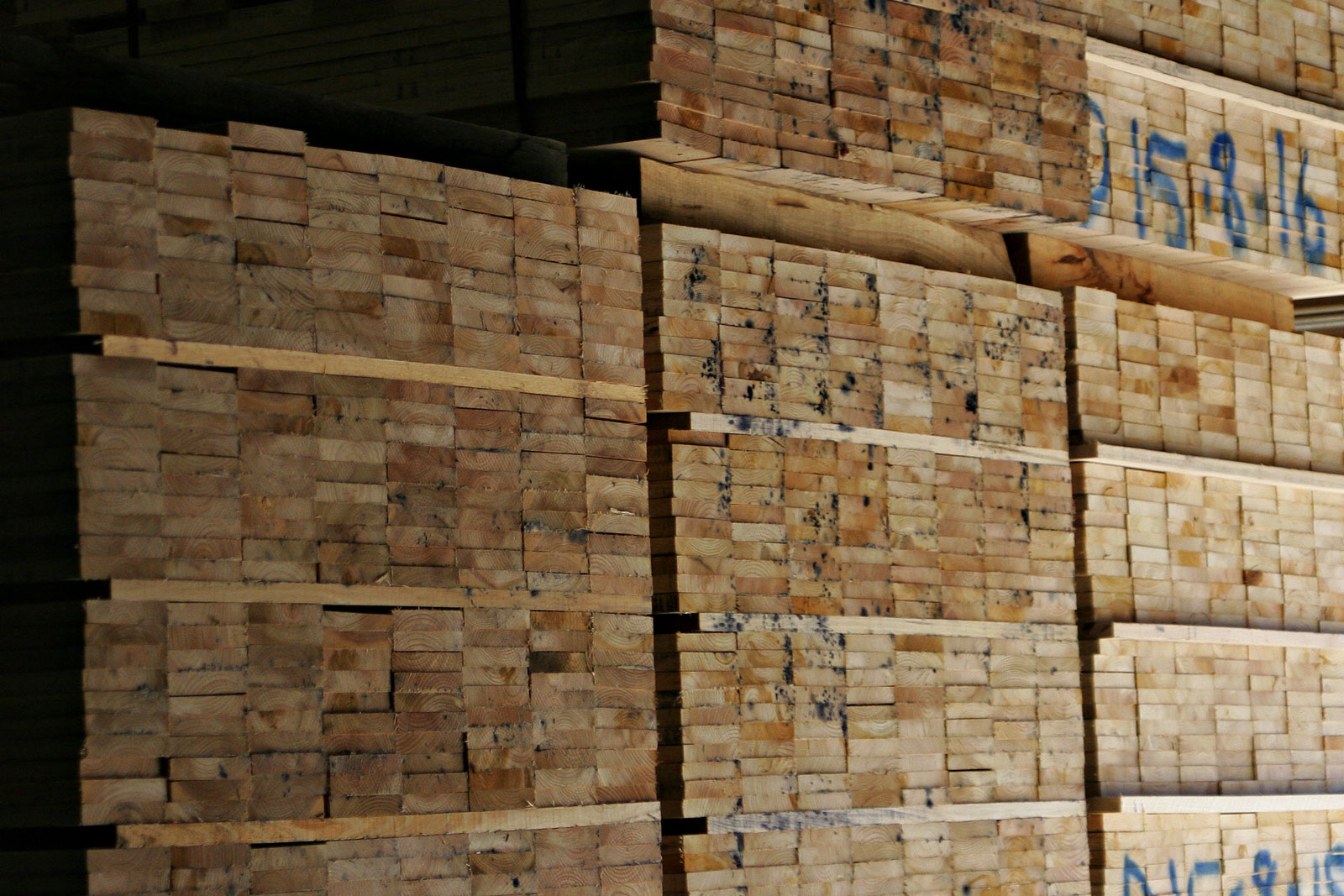
Pallets in the Swifts Creek Sawmill

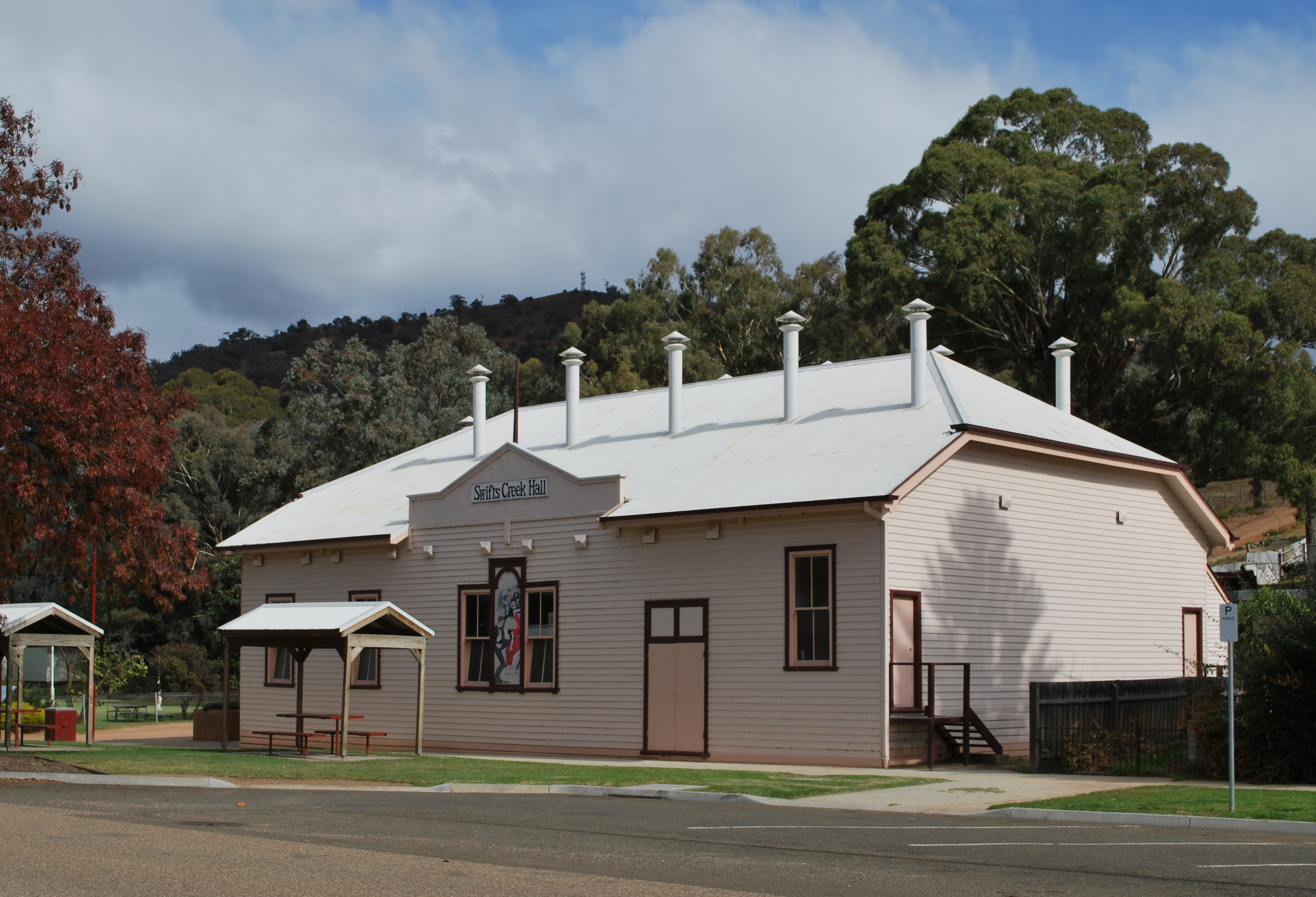
Swifts Creek Hall

The primary industries today are timber and farming of sheep and cattle. The Pentarch Group acquired the sawmill in June 2021 and the mill specialises in making wood pallets out of low grade local mountain ash timber. It uses an advanced system designed in France which aims at utilising the entire log, and thus making the process economical.

Besides this, the major employers in town are now the local branch of the Department of Sustainability and Environment (DSE), the Bush Nurses Centre and the government primary and secondary schools. There are also a number of small retail outlets and services, including a hotel, general store, gallery, cafe, bakery and post office. There is also a community centre, and a community hall.

== Tourism ==
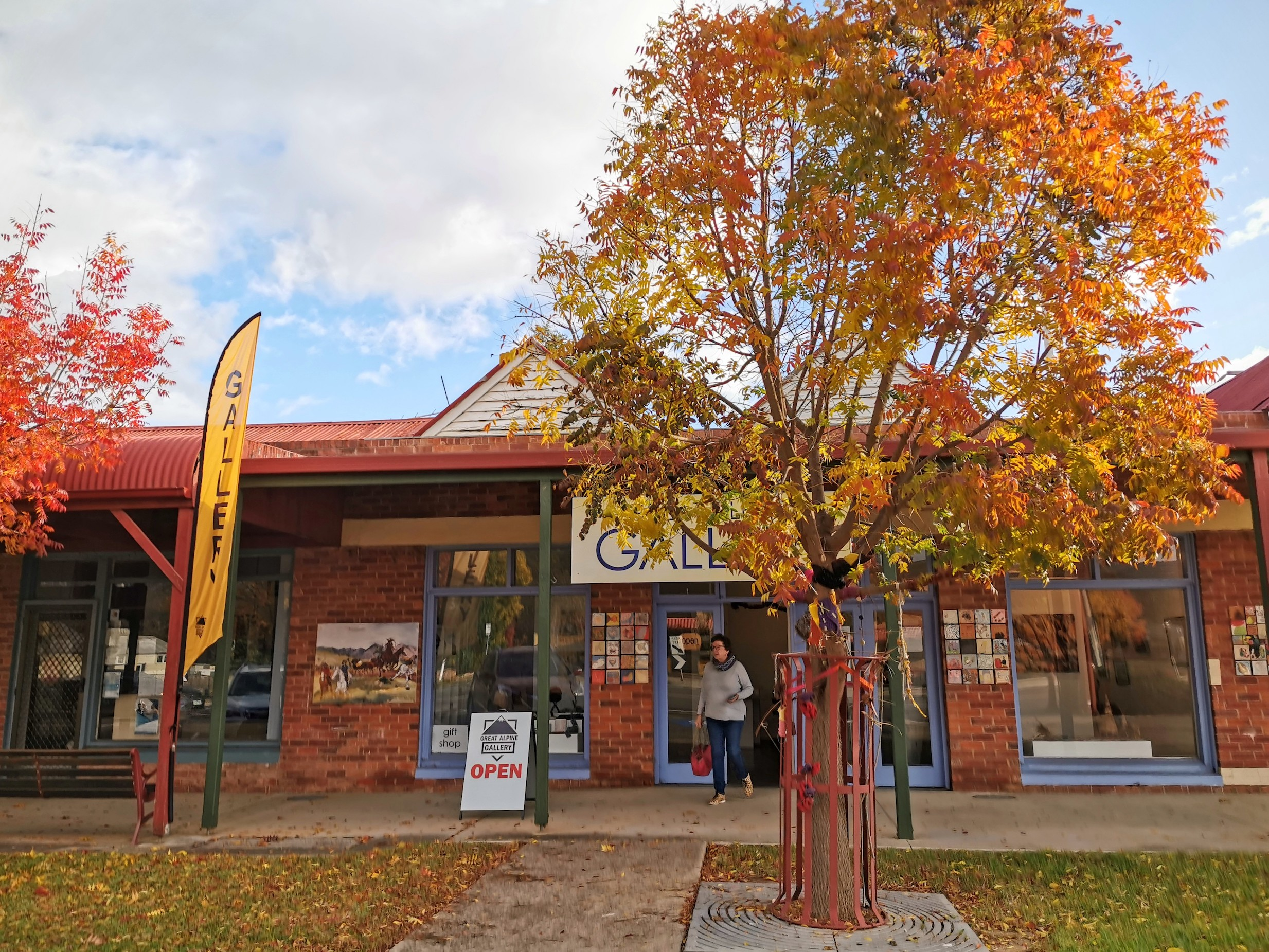
Great Alpine Gallery in autumn

The district is also increasing in popularity as a tourist destination due to its central location in an area of outstanding natural beauty. The town itself offers limited tourist accommodation, including flats associated with the hotel and a newly renovated caravan park on the Tambo River (book through the IGA store). But there is plenty of accommodation in the district including cottage style accommodation approximately five kilometres from town heading towards Cassilis and many houses available for holiday rental on accommodation websites. The township is regarded as a gateway destination to the Alpine area, and the snow fields of Mt Hotham, but also is a target area for cyclists, hikers, anglers, walkers, photographers, painters and hunters.

The Great Alpine Gallery on the Great Alpine Road, Swifts Creek, was founded in 1998 as a non-profit community art-space operated entirely by volunteers. The Gallery is open five days a week, Thursdays to Mondays. Entry to the Gallery is free for all visitors, and everyone is welcome. The gallery promotes and sells arts and crafts by local artists, and has regular events such as the Great Alpine Arts Trail, workshops and open studios, as well as a regular exhibition and three special exhibitions per year.

The Poet's Walk is a 1.2 km stretch of Crown Land that forms a walkable track beginning at the Police Station off the Great Alpine Road at the northern end of the township and following Swifts Creek to the junction with the Tambo River. In 2017, a group of local volunteers began the work of reclaiming the track from years of neglect, and it is now an enjoyable walk suitable for most abilities. New specialised areas are being introduced, including a rain forest section, as well as craft resources, with an Indigenous section due shortly. Park benches and seating is being installed in August 2020, as well as a laid track. There are also six new stone cairns with a verse on each from the late John Butler's poem, The River. Another cairn also marks the height of the 1998 flood.

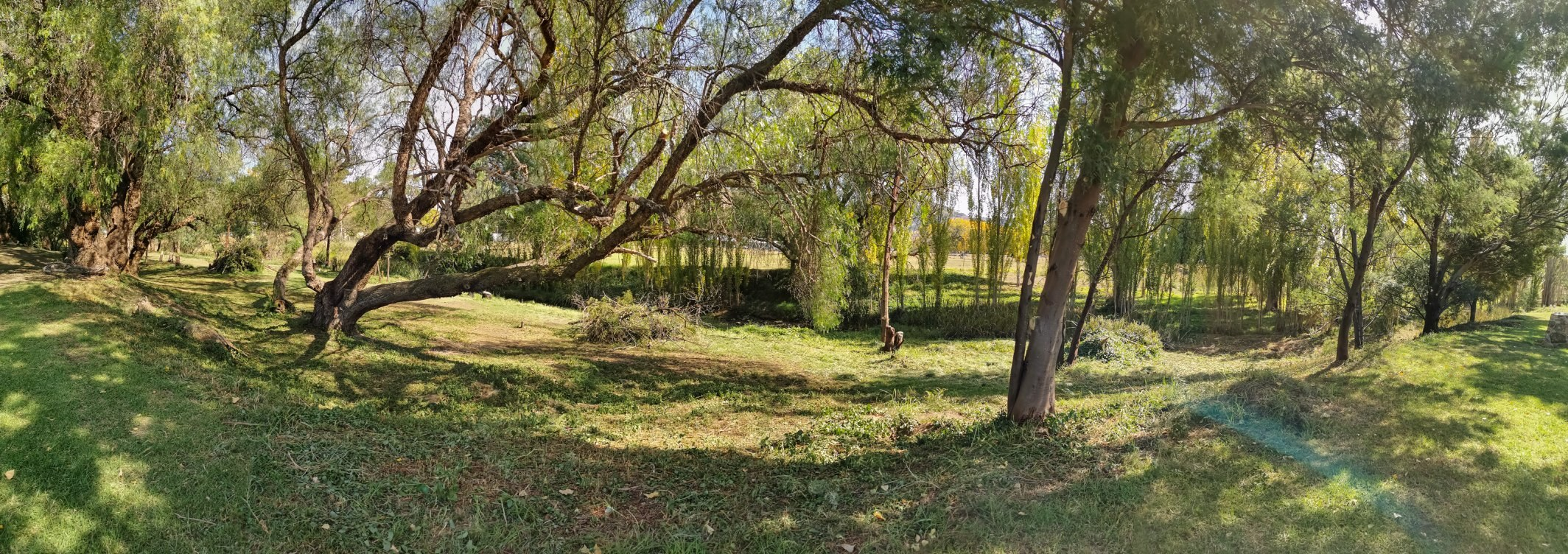
Poets Walk

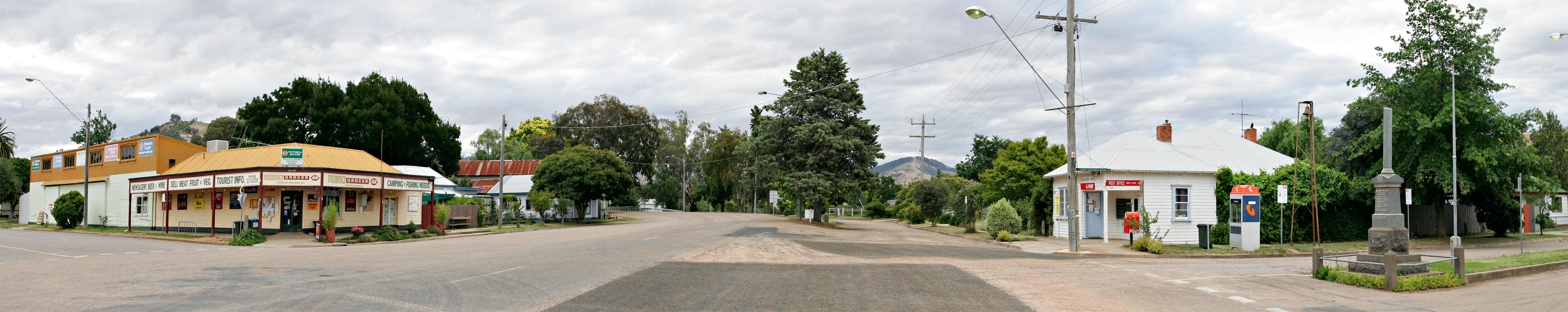
Swifts Creek town centre—general store on the left, former post office on the right

== Education ==
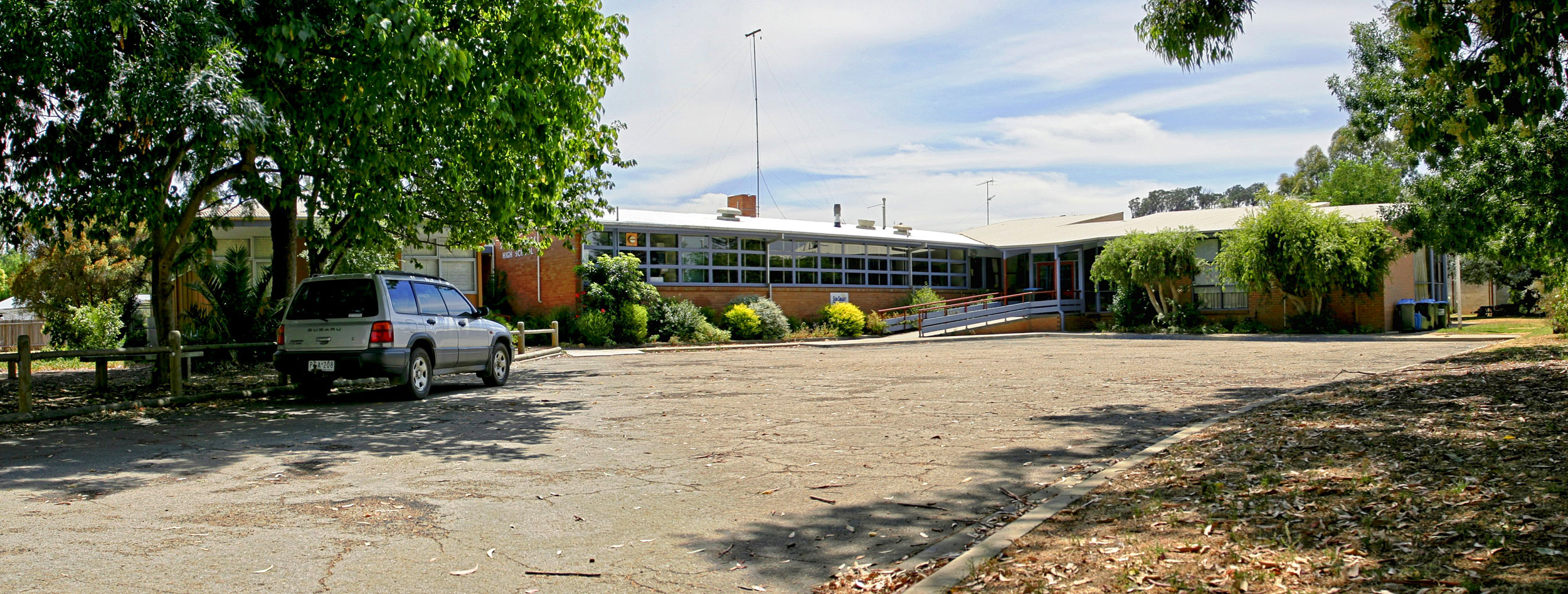
The Tambo Campus of Swifts Creek P-12 School

Swifts Creek P-12 School was formed from the merger of Swifts Creek Secondary College and Swifts Creek Primary School in 2010. The Tambo Campus is the Omeo region's only Secondary College, while the Flagstaff Campus is the town's Primary School. The town also has a separate Kindergarten. The school, in particular the Tambo Campus, caters to students from the surrounding towns of Ensay, Cassilis, Omeo, and Benambra, as well as Swifts Creek itself. The school has an enrolment of around 130 students making it amongst the smallest in the state.

Residents who wish to undertake tertiary education must either do so via distance education, or move away from the town. Students who finish Year 12 at the school usually move to nearby Bairnsdale for tertiary education facilities mainly in the TAFE sector, or to Melbourne or other cities, to attend university. Among alumni of Swift's P-12 school is the AFLW star Josie Gallagher.

== Medical services ==
In October 2023, Omeo District Health announced that Swifts Creek would not have a General Practitioner, instead relying Bush Nurse service with an ambulance.

== Sport ==
=== Facilities ===
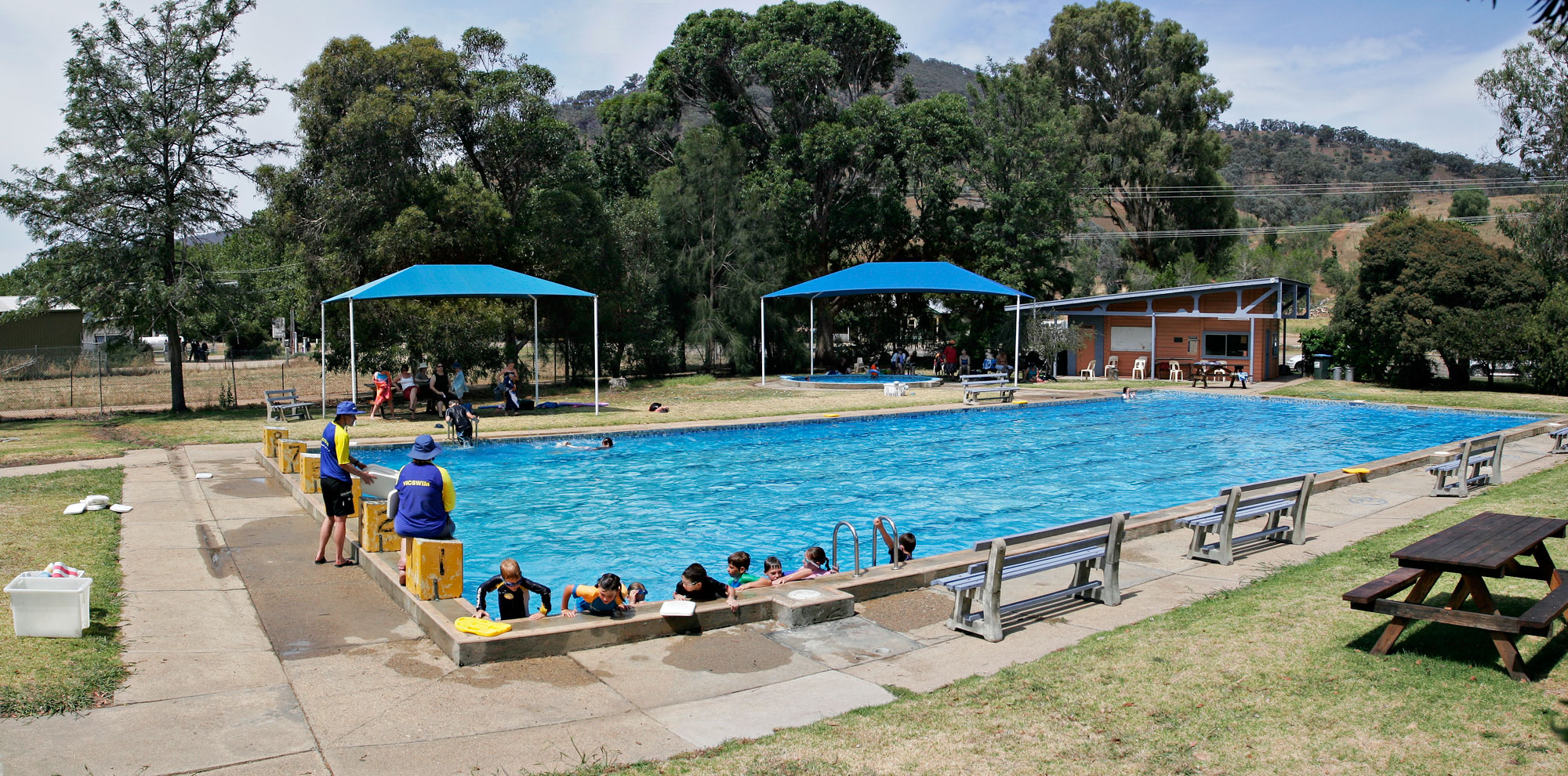
Swifts Creek Swimming Pool

The town's sporting facilities include a recreation reserve consisting of a football/cricket oval, netball courts, four tennis courts, a lawn bowls green, changing rooms, and club rooms.

The town also has a half-Olympic-length six-lane outdoor swimming pool located beside the school, and publicly accessible squash courts located within the grounds of the P-12 school's Tambo Campus. Around two kilometres north of town is the privately owned Tambo Valley Racecourse, where an annual Country Racing Victoria sanctioned picnic horse racing carnival is held on Easter Sunday each year, including the Swifts Creek Cup.

The town's public golf course, the Tambo Valley Golf Club, is located about thirteen kilometres north of town in the locality of Bindi.

=== Clubs ===
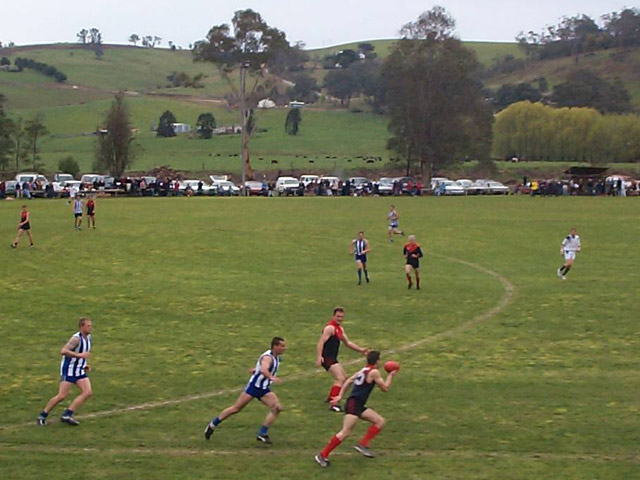
Swifts Creek (in blue and red) defeated Buchan in the 2001 ODFL Grand Final

Despite its small population, Swifts Creek boasts a number of sporting clubs. The Swifts Creek Demons Australian Rules Football team has been in existence for over 100 years. They currently compete in the Omeo & District Football League (ODFL), and have won 25 premierships including several in recent years. The team wears a blue jumper with a red vee, the traditional strip of the Melbourne Football Club AFL team. The affiliated Swifts Creek Netball Club also has a long and successful history, and wears a blue top with red skirt. Both football and netball clubs also have junior teams.

The former Swifts Creek Tennis Club has competed in the Omeo District Tennis Association (ODTA) since the association's inception in 1955, and has won 28 premierships in that time, by far the most successful club in the competition. The lawn bowling club competes in local competition, the former cricket club takes part in regional competitions in irregular seasons, and the golf club is involved in regular tournaments.

Local schools also strongly support the development of youth sport, and regularly compete above their weight in interschool competition in swimming, athletics, and a wide variety of team sports.

=== Diving blocks ===
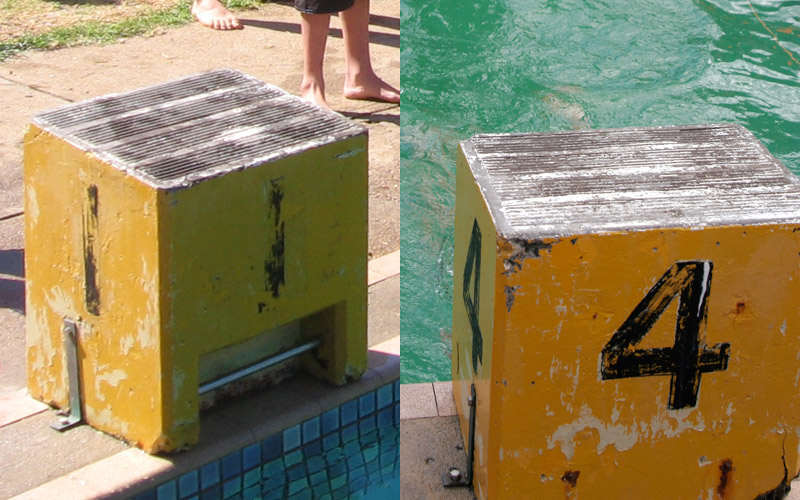
The diving blocks at the Swifts Creek Pool, front and rear view. Legend holds that these are the blocks from the 1956 Melbourne Olympics (see text)

Local legend holds that the diving blocks currently in use at the Swifts Creek Pool were those used in the 1956 Melbourne Olympic Games. Considerable weight is added to this story by careful comparison between these blocks and historical photos from the Olympics, such as this distant photo of a race showing the blocks front on, and especially this close-up photo of block four at a similar angle to that shown here (both historical photos are from the National Library of Australia collection).

It can be seen from the photos that the blocks in Swifts Creek are identical in size and structure to those used at the Melbourne Olympics, and would only have had to be repainted to account for the different colouration and style of the block numbers. Furthermore, the legend states that one of the missing blocks was given to Australian swimming icon Dawn Fraser as a souvenir of her success at the Games (there were eight blocks for the Olympics, but only six survive in Swifts Creek now). However, there has been an alternative local legend circulating how one diving block was stolen during the 1970s by some say a Bairnsdale boy by the name of Michael Weston accompanied by Daniel Redenbach and Tom Alvin during a local festival.

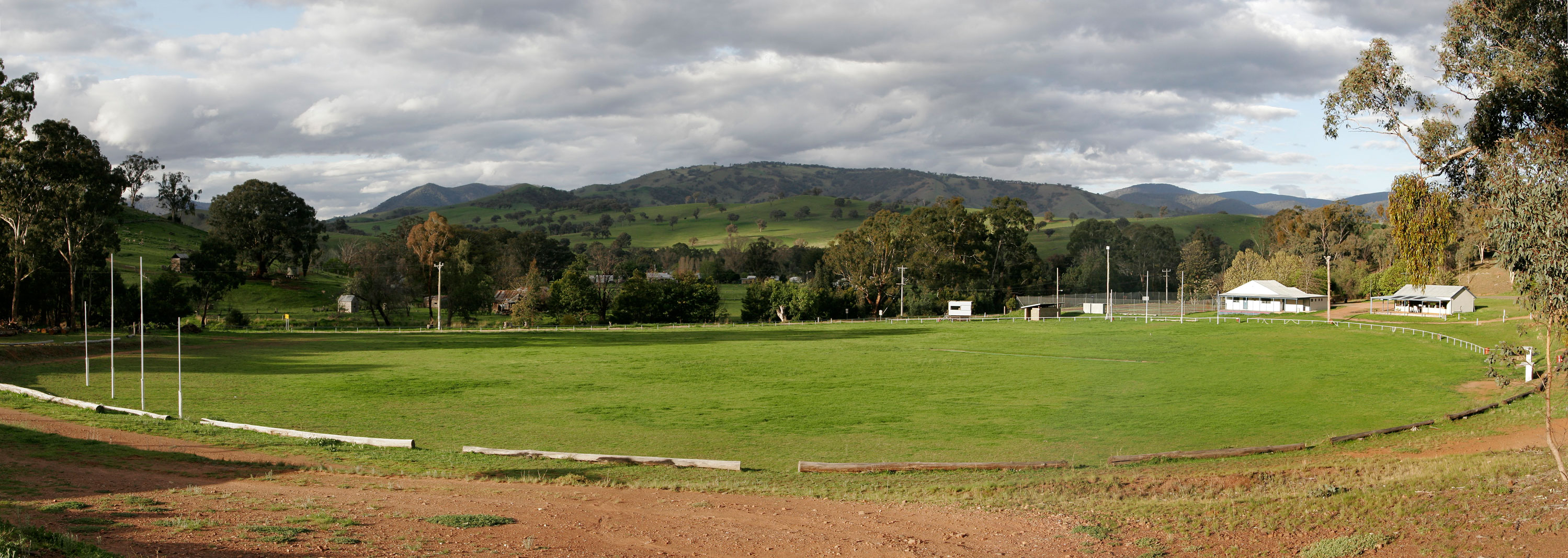
The picturesque surroundings of the Football Oval at the Swifts Creek Recreation Reserve

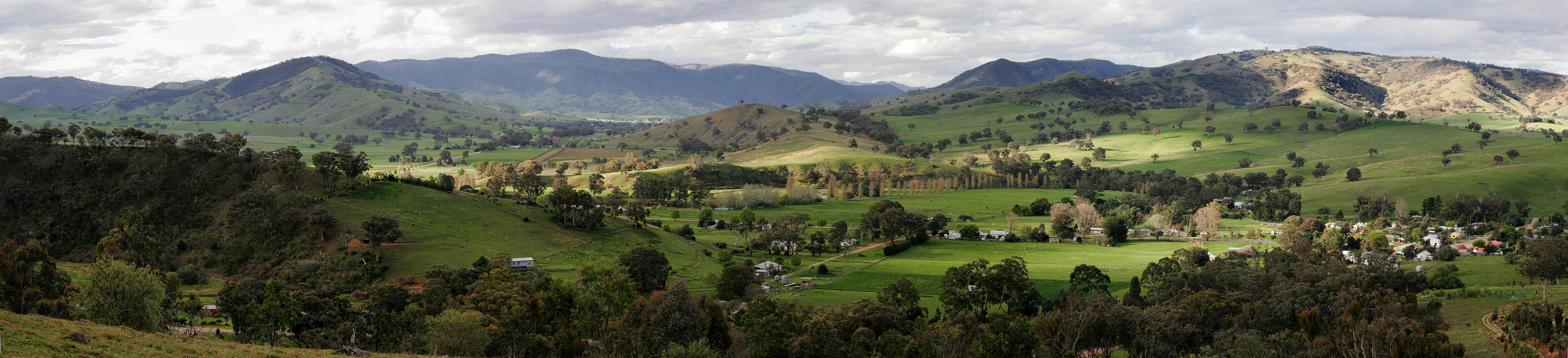
Scenic hills surrounding Swifts Creek, Victoria, Australia

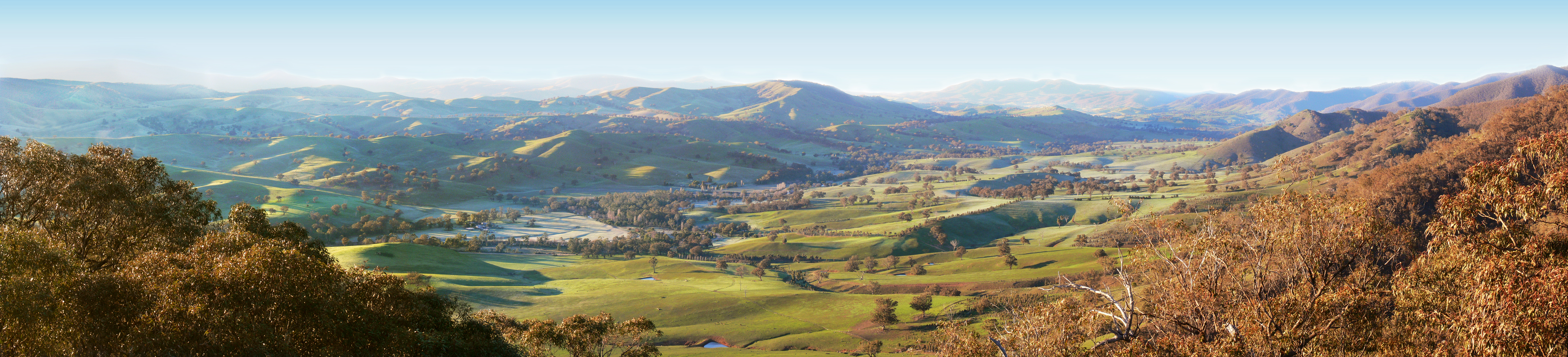
The farmland surrounding Swifts Creek

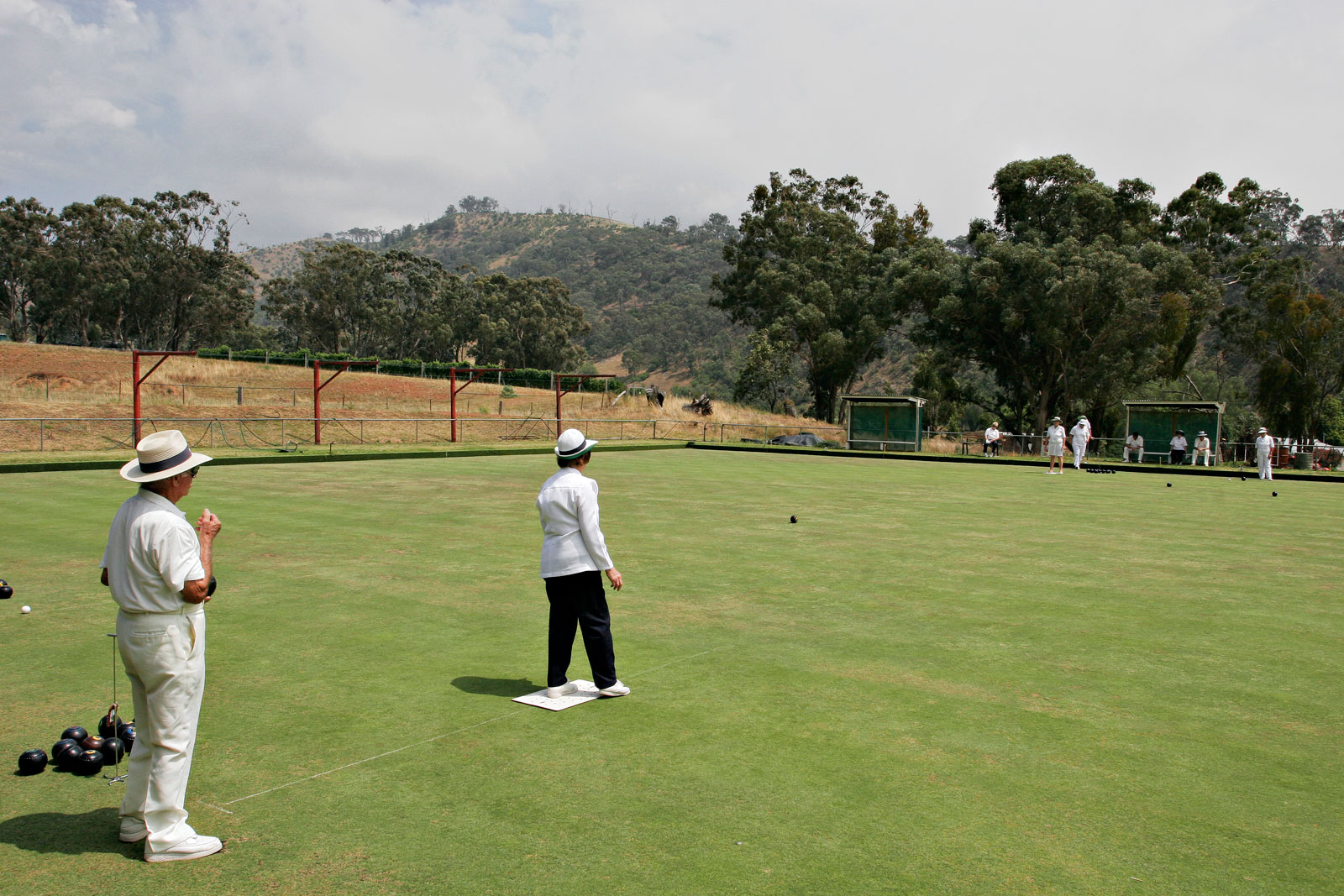
Swifts Creek Bowls Club

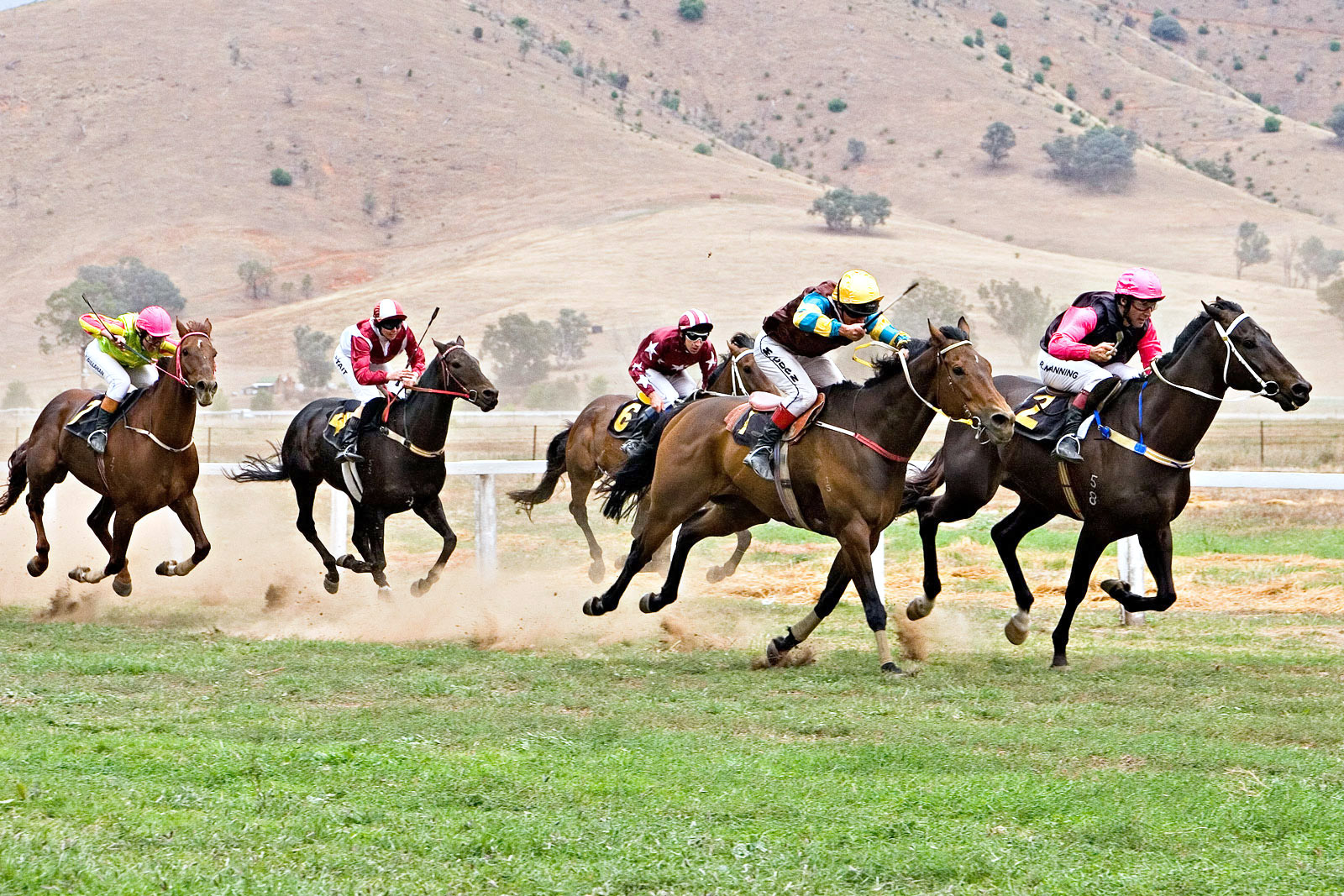
Tambo Valley Races 2006

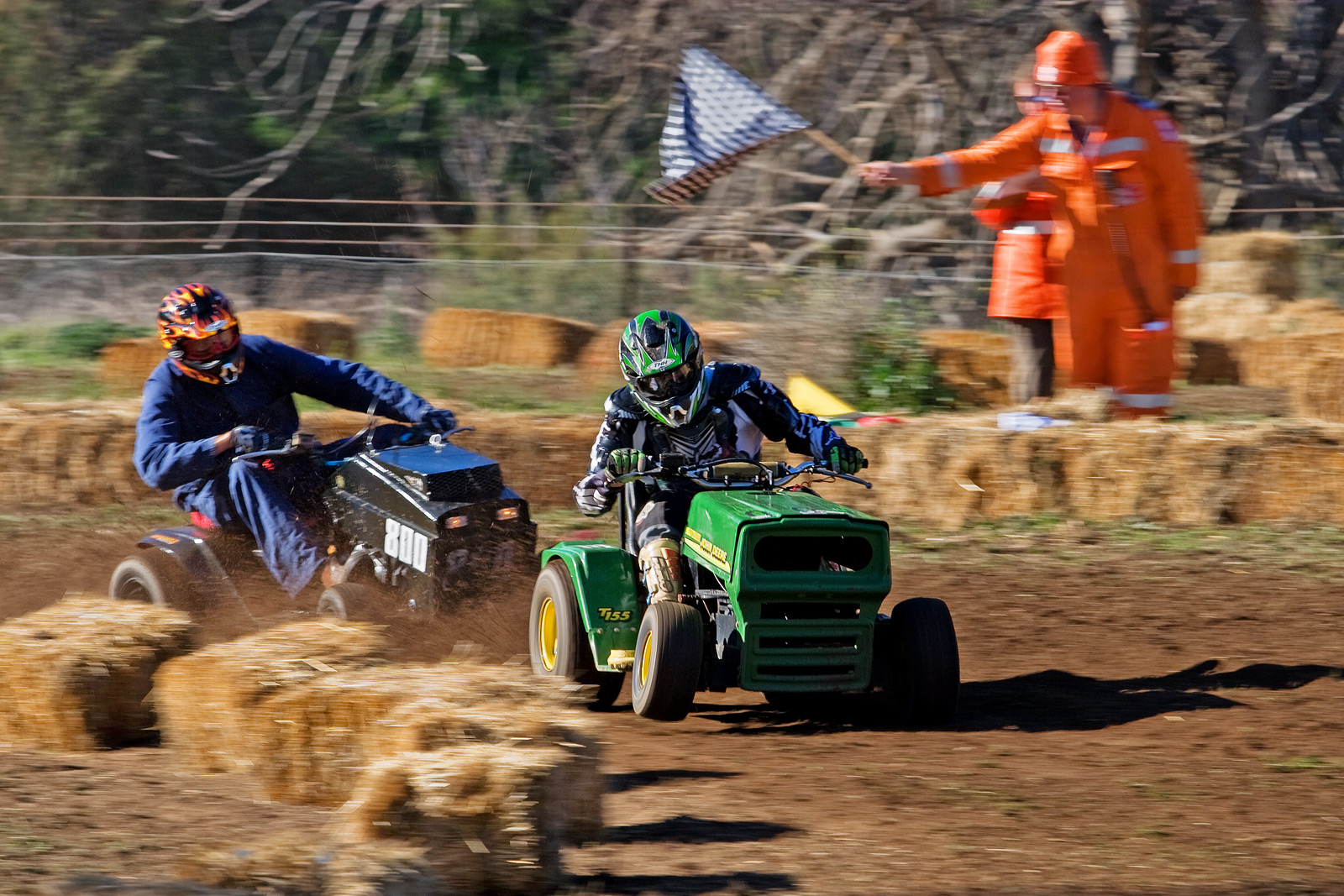
Swifts Creek Lawnmower Races
