= Guboo Ted Thomas =

Aboriginal Australian leader

- Born: Edwin Thomas; 29 Jan 1909; Jembaicumbene, Braidwood, South Coast, New South Wales, Australia
- Died: 19 May 2002 (aged 93); Moruya, South Coast, New South Wales, Australia
- Spouse(s): 2 wives, 1 partner
- Children: 12 children
- Parent(s): William “Bill” Iberia Thomas (1888-1952) & Mary Gwendoline "Lino" Ahoy (1886–1959)

Edwin "Guboo" Ted Thomas (29 January 1909 – 19 May 2002), a Yuin man, was a prominent Aboriginal leader. He toured Australia with a gumleaf orchestra during the Great Depression of the 1930s, played rugby league and became a respected elder who campaigned for protection of sacred sites on the South Coast. He went to the United Nations in New York and urged the World Council of Churches to accept Indigenous religions, and also met the Dalai Lama.

== Early life ==
Guboo Ted Thomas was born in 1909 under a gum tree at Jembaicumbene in the Braidwood area of the South Coast of New South Wales. He was born into the Yuin people, which he always maintained was a Nation made up of many individual tribes. Ted is a contraction of his birth name Edwin; and Guboo, the name he was best known for, was his tribal name meaning "good friend". Guboo was son of William "Bill" Iberia Thomas, a tribal elder, and Mary Gwendoline "Linno" Ahoy, a woman of Chinese descent. Although he was the third of ten children, he was recognised as a future spiritual leader by the elders of the Yuin before he was ten years old.

Thomas knew most about his father's family, and it was from his father's family that he drew his strong bonds with the Aboriginal community. His father William "Bill" Iberia Thomas (1888-?) and his grandfather Peter Thomas were both tribal elders. His grandmother Hannah (Nyaadi) McGrath was a medicine woman who took him along on her healing rounds, and told him Dreamtime stories. His father, grandfather and uncles instructed him in sacred rites, male ancestral laws and Yuin customs . He was eventually chosen by them to be given special knowledge and to become the future elder and spiritual leader of the Yuin Nation.

His part-Aboriginal mother Mary Gwendoline "Linno" Ahoy (1887–1959) had a Chinese father. Thomas also knew that she had French blood as her mother's surname had been de Mestre; his French great-great-grandfather Prosper de Mestre (1789–1844) was a prominent businessman in Sydney from 1818 to 1844, while his Chinese grandfather James Ahoy was a market gardener in the Braidwood area at the time of the gold rush, who moved back to China leaving his family behind.

Thomas grew up on the Wallaga Lake Aboriginal Station, an Aboriginal reserve run by the New South Wales Aborigines Protection Board, where he attended the tiny local school until he was eight. Thomas would say of this time: "All I was taught at school was to knit, sew, make little johnnycakes and tend a garden. In those days, no-one bothered to teach the Aboriginal children the three Rs". Withdrawn from school by his parents, his education in Dreamtime culture then began. When he was nine, his father, uncle and other Yuin elders took him on their Dreamtime walkabout from Mallacoota on the Victorian border to the Hawkesbury River and showed him all the sacred sites for which he would later be responsible. During his early years he also watched as his grandfather called in dolphins to help them catch fish, and called in killer whales to help them catch whales, his grandfather even being called by the killer whales at night to join a hunt.

== Musical career ==
As a teenager he toured with a Hawaiian performing troupe, and later was a member of the Wallaga Lake Gumleaf Band that toured southern New South Wales and Victoria, and performed at the opening of the Sydney Harbour Bridge in 1932. The Gumleaf Band played at football dances, and on the back of trucks at district shows, gymkhanas, and sports picnics on the beach. He used these trips to visit Aboriginal missions from Victoria, up the New South Wales coast into Queensland, and inland over the Great Dividing Range. He would visit the old people to learn more about their customs and beliefs, tour their sacred sites and talk to them about protecting the land and the Great Spirit that sustained it.

The band included seven of Thomas's family, including his father and uncles and three of his brothers. It performed traditional dances with sticks and spears, and also did step dancing, tap dancing, hula dancing, burlesque, clowning, and singing. They made music with gum leaves, an accordion, ukuleles, guitars, fiddle, and drums. Thomas played the guitar, so very different from the traditional instruments that he played in his later years of the clapping sticks and didgeridoo.

== Land rights and cultural work ==
After his music career Thomas then took work on various jobs around New South Wales including jackarooing, collecting shellac, cutting railway sleepers, working in the timber industry, as leader of an Aboriginal work-crew at Warragamba Dam, and as a union delegate at a Botany foundry. Most of his working life, however, was spent as a commercial fisherman on the South Coast applying that special knowledge given to him by his elders, except that "the middleman made all the money".

He spent some time at the Salt Pan Creek camp in the 1930s, and later, in the 1970s, he and other elders like Jacko Campbell explained the importance of the free community at the refugee camp there, which been a centre of Aboriginal rights activism.

After the 1967 referendum, which changed the Australian Constitution so that Aboriginal people would be counted in the Australian census, and hereafter be subject to Commonwealth laws rather than state laws, he sold his fishing-boat after 25 years, to devote himself to the responsibilities handed to him by his beloved elders. He moved back to Wallaga Lake with his family.

In the early 1970s Thomas and his wife Ann and other tribal Elders joined Pastor Frank Roberts' New South Wales Aboriginal Lands and Rights Council. This experience strengthened Thomas's commitment to Aboriginal land rights and culture. "Land rights, self-determination, and cultural identity" became his catch-cry. His activism began by hitchhiking to Canberra to urge the Government to make the Wallaga Lake Aboriginal Station into a reserve and to seek protection of the sacred sites. Before long he began working with the Australian Institute of Aboriginal Studies (now AIATSIS), recording all the Aboriginal sites in coastal New South Wales. His work with the Institute of Aboriginal Studies was ground-breaking, and became the basis of all future land claims along the South Coast. He attended land rights marches in Wollongong, and land rights meetings in Sydney. In 1977 he played a significant role in the establishment of a New South Wales Aboriginal Land Council to co-ordinate the land rights campaign. In 1978 he helped prepare land claims which were presented to the New South Wales Government. After five years of demonstrations and lobbying, the Wallaga Lake community received its title deeds, and he proudly accepted them. He died before the ownership of a much greater area, of the former Wallaga Lake National Park and the rest of the Gulaga National Park were restored to the area's original owners, the Yuin people, in May 2006.

In 1978 Thomas became alarmed about forestry operations on nearby Mumbulla Mountain threatening sacred sites. The New South Wales National Parks and Wildlife Service, with the help of Thomas, commenced an Anthropological and Archaeological investigation of Mumbulla Mountain. This investigation supported the claims of the Yuin people, and determined that Mumbulla Mountain is significant to Aboriginal people. Several politicians still claimed there were no sacred sites and dismissed Thomas's claims. In 1979 the then seventy-year-old elder first came to public attention when, largely through his efforts, the New South Wales Premier Neville Wran ordered a cease to logging on the Mumbulla Mountain south of Bermagui. Thomas continued the fight, and after five long years the victory was a significant land rights settlement for Aboriginal people.

Around this time, he began espousing a spiritual message, believing that the noisy protests and marches only aggravated racism. He became a member of the Baháʼí Faith, emphasising the spiritual unity of humankind of all religions. In 1984 the then 75-year-old began travelling the world teaching the Dreamtime, the heart of Aboriginal spirituality. He wanted to build bridges, bringing people together through a mutual love and respect for Mother Earth. He wanted the Dreaming to enrich the lives of all Australians, and devoted the rest of his life to being a catalyst for a worldwide return to selfless ancient values. He went to the United Nations, and he asked the World Council of Churches to accept Indigenous religions. He met spiritual and religious leaders, like the Dalai Lama, who would later contact him when passing through Australia.

For the next 20 years he held "Dreaming camps" around Australia and overseas to teach and pass on his knowledge, to renew the Dreaming of these places and restore sacredness to the landscape. He spent each January at Blue Gum Flats, in the Budawangs, behind Pigeon House Mountain (Bulgarn). Thousands of people from around the world came to meet him in the deep wilderness and to seek a spiritual relationship with nature. Many non-Indigenous Australians participated in these Dreaming camps.

In 1988, the year of the Australian Bicentenary, the 79-year-old had re-enacted his own childhood 350 km (220 mi) Dreamtime walk of seven decades earlier. The walk went from Mallacoota on the Victorian border to the Hawkesbury River, and took six weeks. Thomas walked with a group of Koori children from broken homes.

Thomas envisioned a nation that has put internal conflict between white and black Australians behind it in the realisation of a truly unified Australian identity with a respect for Aboriginal culture and love of the land as its bedrock. While Thomas went on to work tirelessly to bring black and white together, his own people mistrusted him for most of his remaining life.

For the remainder of his life Thomas held "Renewing the Dreaming" Camps around Australia and overseas, for which he was well respected. However among his own people he was not without his critics, some of whom felt that he had discovered the perks of being a new-age guru to the white community. Unfortunately he also sometimes upset the actual traditional owners of the land where his ceremonies were held, by not always respecting their sacred sites, and by violating local Aboriginal laws.

== Later life and death ==
He shared the Dreamtime stories from his childhood with all who would listen. His birthday present for his 90th birthday in 1999 was the performance of a puppet show "Dreamtime Stories of the Yuin Tribe" performing a Dreamtime story as told to Thomas by his grandmother "Granny Tungii" the medicine woman.

Ever the gentle activist, in February 2002 he took part in a protest at Sandon Point near Wollongong demonstrating against a development threatening Aboriginal sites and the area's natural beauty. The 93-year-old sat in a wheelchair and clapped two sticks together. He also identified some "sacred stones" in Thomas Gibson Park at Thirroul, but Wollongong Council took more almost two years before they arranged for him to come from Wallaga to the site and identify them in early 2002. Thomas was then too unwell to walk the site in order to re-locate and identify them and the site was later approved for residential development.

Active in what he saw as his life's work till the very end, in his last days he participated in a study about Indigenous kinship with the Natural World in New South Wales.

He died at 93 years of age on 19 May 2002, just before that year's Reconciliation Week celebrated the rich culture and history of Australia's Koori citizens.

== Works and legacy ==
Thomas's work in developing mutual respect and understanding, and in the renewal of the Spirit and the Dreaming, was prolific and ongoing. In his own words:
The Earth is our Mother.
When I die I'm going down there.
When you die you're going there too.
But what are you doing for the Earth?

Thomas wanted Aboriginal spirituality, the Dreaming, to enrich the lives of all Australians. His accomplishments showed his commitment to Australia, and his Aboriginal community in particular:

- Through his work with the Australian Institute of Aboriginal Studies, an invaluable record of sacred sites along the New South Wales coast was established.
- It was largely through his efforts that logging ceased on Mumbulla Mountain, which led to a significant land rights settlement in New South Wales.
