= Umbarra =

Australian Aboriginal elder (died 1904)

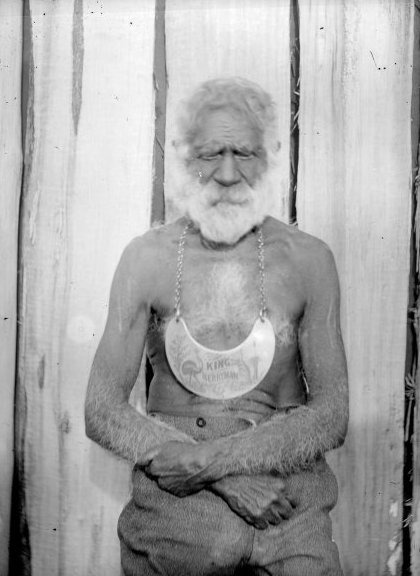
Umbarra, King Merriman, from the Yuin of Bermagui with King plate

Umbarra, or King Merriman (died 1904) was an elder of the Djirringanj/Yuin people of the Bermagui area on what has become called the Sapphire Coast since European Colonial settlement of far-southern New South Wales coastal area.

Although Aboriginal people traditionally did not have kings or chiefs, only elders, the colonial powers used to often grant king plates to certain elders, hence the moniker "King".

== Life ==
Umbarra lived on Merriman Island, in the middle of Wallaga Lake, while his people lived on the shores of the lake. Umbarra was believed to have clairvoyant abilities, and communicated with a black duck, his moojingarl or being with which he had a spiritual connection, which warned him of coming danger.

Umbarra provided information on the Yuin to Alfred William Howitt for Howitt's 1904 book The native tribes of South-East Australia.

Umbarra's father, who was also associated with the black duck, is believed to have also been named Merriman and to have died around 1850. His wife, Queen Narelle, died around 1900. The brother of Umbarra and the brother of Narelle, despite being unrelated to one another, founded a single family, the Nobles. Yuin genealogist and researcher Dave Tout is a descendant of the Nobles.

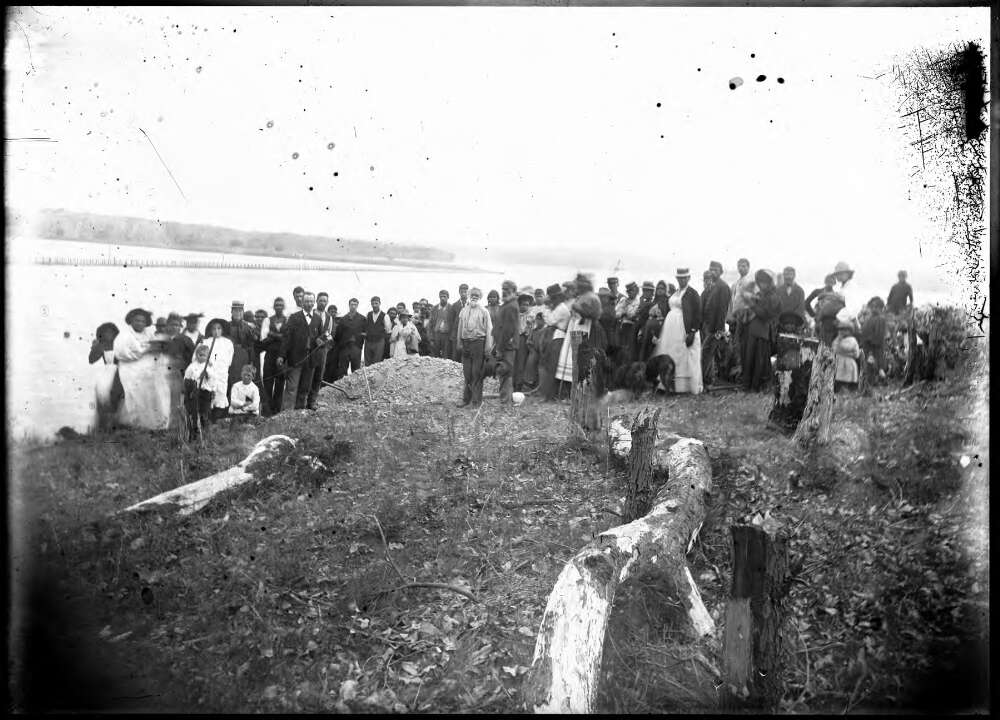
Funeral of Queen Narelle, Umbarra's wife, circa 1900

== Legends ==
Many legends exist about Umbarra and his moojingarl. One day it told him of a group of warriors coming from the far south to do battle. King Merriman remained on the island while the other men took the women and children to a place of safety and then hid in the reeds. The first to sight the approaching warriors, the King warned his men who fought a fierce battle but lost. The opposing tribesmen then set out for the island.

King Merriman threw powerful spears, and a boomerang which severed the arms and heads of his opponents before returning to him, but it was not enough. He then turned himself into a whirlwind and flew off. He passed over the fierce Kiola tribe and their wise men correctly divined his presence and that it meant the defeat of the Wallaga people and the advance of another tribe. King Merriman journeyed on to the Shoalhaven tribe to warn them but the Kiola tribe defeated the invaders and the King, whose power was finished, stayed for a time at the Shoalhaven then travelled away.

== Today ==
General access to Merriman Island is forbidden due to its great significance for Indigenous people, and is gazetted as an Aboriginal site.

The former Wallaga Lake National Park is incorporated into Gulaga National Park.
