= Djiringanj =

The Djiringanj, also spelt Dyirringañ, are an Aboriginal Australian people of the southern coast of New South Wales. They are one of a larger group, known as the Yuin people, who all speak or spoke dialects of the Yuin–Kuric group of languages.

== Language ==
Robert M. W. Dixon classifies the Djiringanj language as distinct from both Thaua and Dhurga. They are all Yuin–Kuric languages.

== Country ==
The Djiringanj's tribal lands encompassed roughly 1,200 square miles (3,100 km^{2}) southwards along the coast from Cape Dromedary to beyond Bega. Their inland extension ran up to the scarp of the Great Dividing Range east of Nimmitabel. They were wedged between the Walbanga to their north and the Thaua to their south, while their western limits touched those of the Ngarigo.

== Wallaga Lake ==
In early 2020, men from the Bermagui Wallaga Lake Djiringanj men's group were able to resume their traditional practice of fish with nets on Wallaga Lake for the first time in decades. After obtaining a special cultural fishing permit, that allows them to fish once a week using a specially built boat and handmade traditional net, young men from the community will target species like flathead, bream, and mullet, and hand over their catch to local elders.

They see it as a way of helping people who live below the poverty line, and suffer from poor nutrition, particularly lack of iodine, and diseases such as heart disease and diabetes brought on by poor nutrition.

== Alternative names ==
- Dyirringan
- Jeringin
- Yuin (term used collectively by Alfred William Howitt to denote both the Yuin and the Thaua)

Source: Tindale 1974, p. 193

== Sources ==
- Dixon, R. M. W. (2002). Australian Languages: Their Nature and Development. Cambridge University Press. ISBN 978-0-521-47378-1.
- Howitt, Alfred William (1904). The native tribes of south-east Australia (PDF). Macmillan.
- Milton, Vanessa; Wheaton, Claire (22 March 2020). "Fishermen revive Indigenous net fishing tradition in landmark collaboration". ABC News.
- Slattery, Deirdre (2015). Australian Alps: Kosciuszko, Alpine and Namadgi National Parks. Csiro Publishing. ISBN 978-1-486-30172-0.
- Tindale, Norman Barnett (1974). "Djiringanj(NSW)". Aboriginal Tribes of Australia: Their Terrain, Environmental Controls, Distribution, Limits, and Proper Names. Australian National University. Archived from the original on 20 March 2020.
