= Alex Brown (academic) =

Australian clinician and researcher

Alex Brown is an Australian clinician and researcher and a member of the Yuin nation. He is the Professor of Indigenous Genomics at Telethon Kids Institute and the Australian National University (ANU) and the director of the National Centre of Indigenous Genomics at the ANU.

== Early life and education ==
Brown grew up on the south coast of New South Wales and he has family connections to Nowra, Wreck Bay and Wallaga Lake on the far south coast of NSW.

Brown received his bachelor's degree from University of Newcastle and his Masters of Public Health from Braun School of Public Health and Community Medicine.

He completed his PhD at University of Queensland, where his thesis focused on the psychosocial determinants of coronary heart disease in Indigenous men.

== Career and research ==
Since 2019 he has been a professor of medicine at the University of Adelaide.

In 2023 he was the first Indigenous scientist appointed to the CSIRO board. In 2023 he also became the director of the National Centre of Indigenous Genomics at the ANU.

Brown also leads the Australian ALliance for Indigenous GeNomics (ALIGN), which focuses on ensuring Indigenous Australians benefit from genomics research.

== Personal life ==
His sister, Ngiare Brown, was one of the first Indigenous medical graduates in Australia. She is also the first female and first Indigenous Chancellor of James Cook University.

== Awards and honors ==
- In 2012 he was awarded the Viertel Senior Medical Research Fellowship.
- In 2010 he was awarded an Honorary Fellowship to the Royal Australasian College of Physicians.
- Brown was elected a Fellow of the Australian Academy of Health and Medical Sciences in 2015
- He was elected a Fellow of the Australian Academy of Technological Sciences and Engineering in 2024.
