= Janet Mathews =

Australian pianist, music teacher and linguist

Janet Elizabeth Mathews
- Born: Janet Elizabeth Russell; 18 January 1914; Wollongong, Australia
- Died: 1 January 1992 (aged 77); Neutral Bay, Australia
- Education: Presbyterian Ladies' College, Sydney; Frensham School, Mittagong; Sydney Conservatorium of Music
- Occupations: Pianist; Linguist

Janet Elizabeth Mathews, née Russell, (18 January 1914 – 1 January 1992) was an Australian pianist, music teacher, and documenter of Aboriginal music, language and culture in New South Wales, who added greatly to the Australian Institute of Aboriginal Studies (AIAS, now AIATSIS) archives. She collaborated with linguist Luise Hercus. In addition to several books on Aboriginal culture, she also authored three children's books.

== Early life and education ==
Janet Elizabeth Russell was born on 18 January 1914 at Wollongong, New South Wales, the only child of Irish-born solicitor James Wilson Russell and Australian-born wife Mary Irene (née McLelland). She was raised in Wollongong, educated by her mother, a pianist, and a governess. On the return voyage from a family trip to Britain and Europe, where they attended many concerts, when Janet was 12 years old, she was impressed by the lectures and violin recitals by fellow passenger composer Alfred Hill.

Russell attended Presbyterian Ladies' College, Sydney from 1927 to 1928, and Frensham School in Mittagong from 1929 to 1930, where she concentrated on studying the piano. The following year she was accepted into the Sydney Conservatorium of Music, where Laurence Godfrey Smith taught piano and Alfred Hill harmony.

== Early career and marriage ==
Due to performing engagements (including performing with her mother and playing with the Sydney String Quartet), she did not complete her diploma course at the Conservatorium.

In 1935 Russell spent time in London and Paris, furthering her musical career and performing at private functions with a distant cousin. After returning to Australia, on 3 December 1936 she married Francis Mackenzie Mathews (Frank), a mechanical engineer, in Wollongong, and the couple went on to have three children (two daughters and a son).

No longer able to perform owing to her domestic duties, she started teaching piano from home in 1954, with one of her students being Gerard Willems.

== Recording Aboriginal culture ==
At the urging of Liberal MP and old friend Bill Wentworth, Mathews became one of the first researchers at the newly established (1964) Australian Institute of Aboriginal Studies (AIAS). Starting out with almost no knowledge of Aboriginal people, she began working as a freelance sound recordist using a large tape recorder, interviewing many people over the years. The AIAS reflected the assimilationist policies of the time, which saw people of unmixed Aboriginal descent as more authentic than biracial descendants. Her major contribution was to the audio archive, and its particular strength was its focus on the Aboriginal peoples of New South Wales, often of mixed ancestry, who provided clear evidence of Aboriginal music and culture continuing after colonisation.

She worked first with speakers of the Dharawal and Dhurga languages on the NSW South Coast. She recorded the father of the later popular singer Jimmy Little playing gum leaf and an elder from Wallaga Lake who was a fluent speaker of Dhurga. She was not always welcomed, but after descendants of a woman who had taught Dharawal to anthropologist R. H. Mathews realised Janet's family connection to him (he was the grandfather of her husband Frank), word got around and people became more cooperative.

Mathews was always known as "Mrs Mathews", and maintained an air of formality and respectability, which led to her being respected by the authorities in charge as well as Aboriginal people.

She then collaborated with renowned linguists Luise Hercus and Lynette Oates to broaden the scope of her recordings beyond music and into linguistic and historical data.

== Later life and death ==
After Frank's retirement in 1968, the couple moved to Sydney, and Janet wrote three children's books with Aboriginal themes. Frank died in 1982, and Janet donated R. H. Mathews' papers to the National Library of Australia. She died on 1 January 1992 at Neutral Bay. Luise Hercus co-wrote an obituary for her.

== Legacy ==
Mathews' recordings of music, language and culture has proven invaluable. She created a total of 180 hours of recordings, from over 80 Aboriginal people, which are now in the AIATSIS archives.

Her work with Hercus proved important in providing evidence of Aboriginal sacred sites on Mumbulla Mountain in New South Wales in the late 1970s, and her work is frequently cited.

== Selected publications ==
- The two worlds of Jimmie Barker: the life of an Australian Aboriginal, 1900-1972, as told to Janet Mathews (1977) – the story of Jimmie Barker who, encouraged by Mathews, himself created over 100 tapes containing the language, stories and customs of the Murawari tribe.
- Wurley & Wommera: Aboriginal Life and Craft (1979)
- The Opal that Turned into Fire; and Other Stories from the Wangkumara (1994)
