= Barunguba / Montague Island =

Island off the coast of New South Wales, Australia

Montague island
Native name: Barunguba
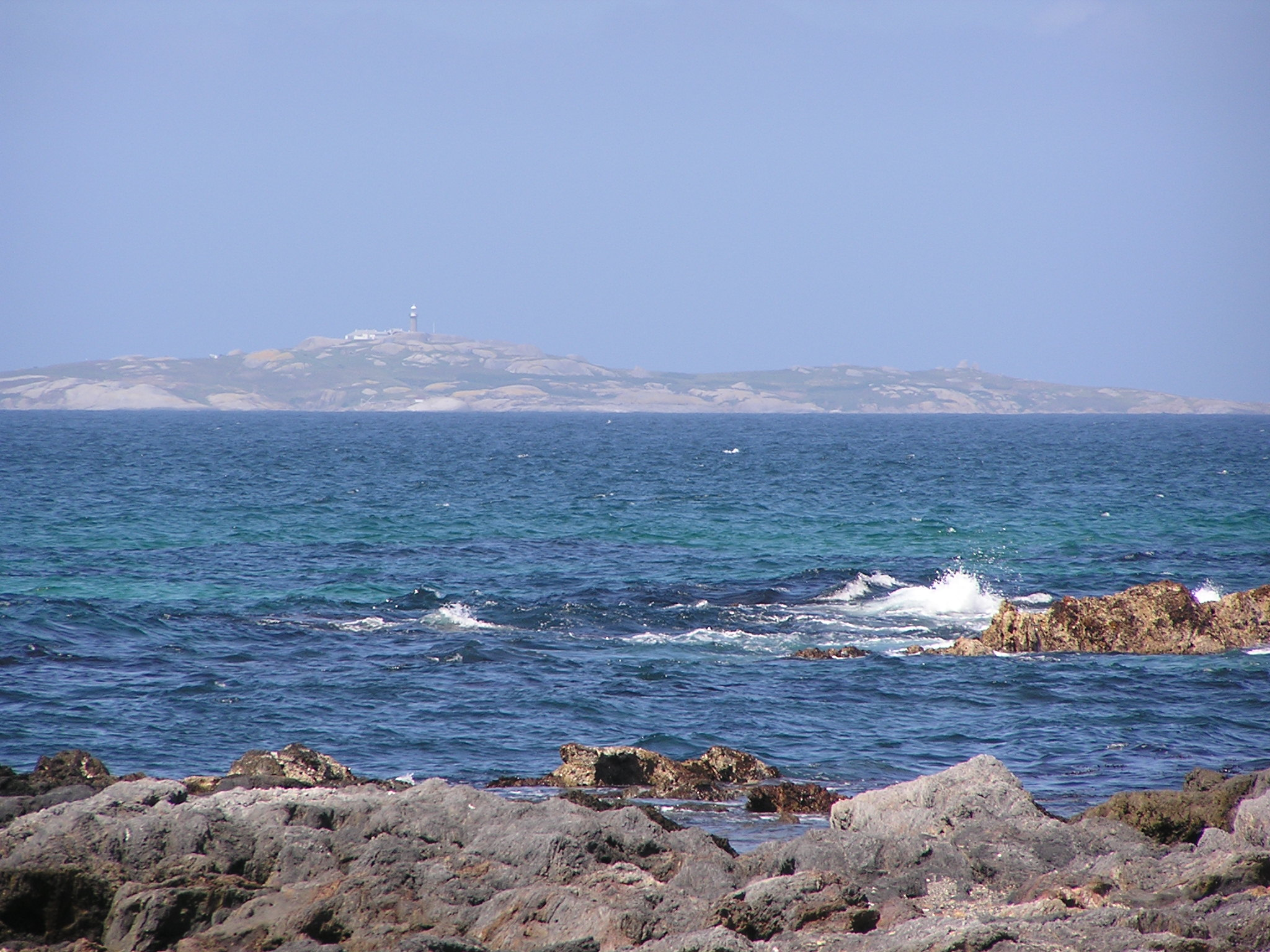
- The island viewed from Narooma, 9 kilometres (5.6 mi) away
- Interactive map of Montague island

Geography
- Location: Tasman Sea

Administration
- Australia
- State: New South Wales

Montague Island Nature Reserve
- IUCN category IV (habitat/species management area)
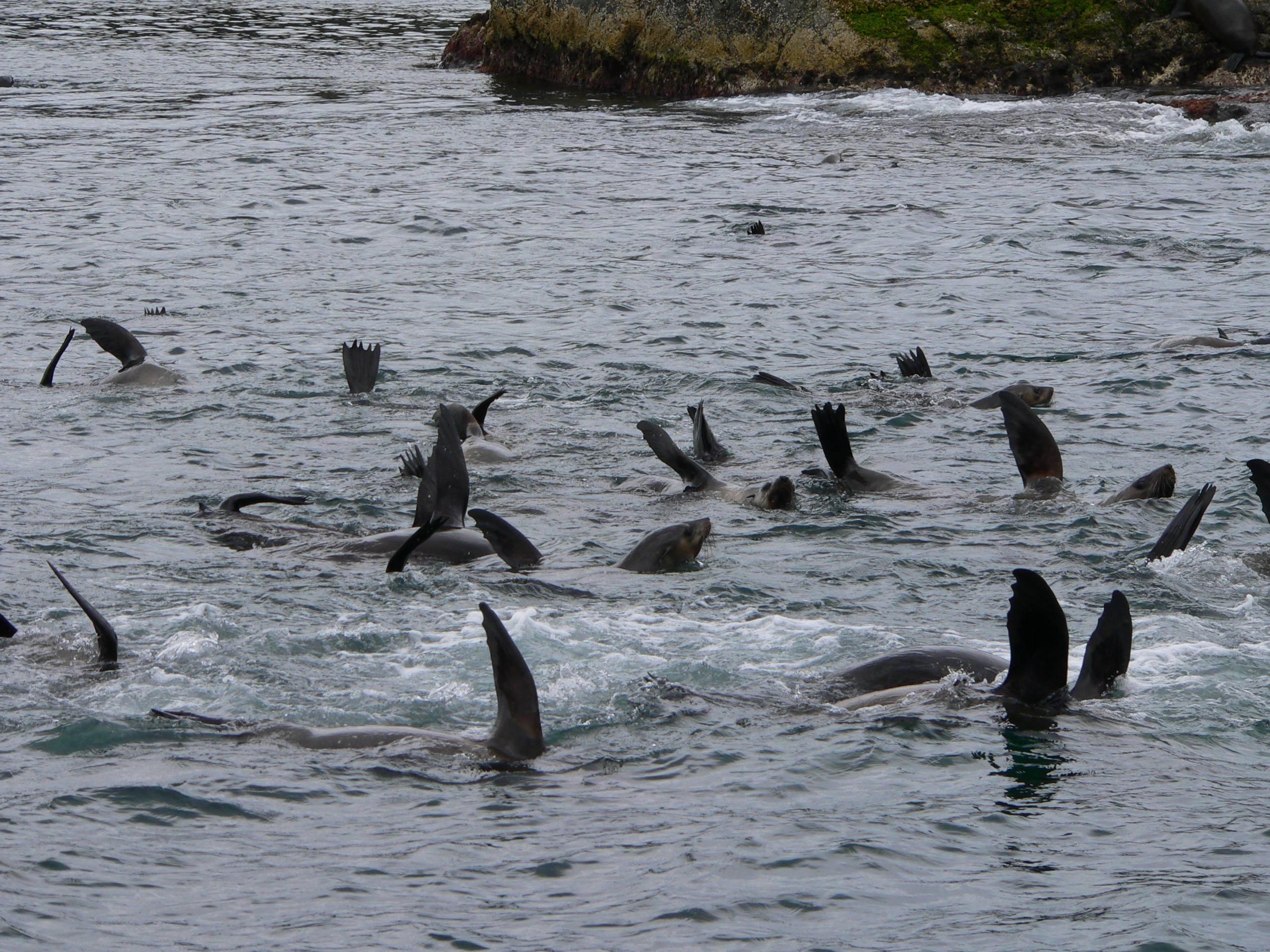
- Australian fur seals located in the water adjacent to the island

- Location within New South Wales
- Location: New South Wales
- Nearest city: Narooma
- Coordinates: 36°15′S 150°13′E
- Area: 0.81 km^{2} (0.31 sq mi)
- Established: January 1990
- Visitors: 6,000 (in 2002)
- Governing body: NSW National Parks & Wildlife Service
- Website: Official website

Barunguba / Montague Island is a continental island contained within the Montague Island Nature Reserve, a protected nature reserve that is located offshore from the South Coast region of New South Wales, in eastern Australia. The nearest town located onshore from the 81-hectare (200-acre) reserve and island is Narooma, situated approximately 9 kilometres (5.6 mi) to the northwest.

== History ==
The island has been known to the local group of Yuin people, the Walbunja people, an Aboriginal nation, as Barunguba, and there are Aboriginal sites of significance across the island. The island features in Aboriginal mythology, as the eldest son of Gulaga (Mount Dromedary), the mother. Her younger son, Najanuka (Little Dromedary), was not allowed to go far from home as Barunguba did, but Gulaga can still see both her sons in the distance.

The Walbunja people used to paddle across to the island in canoes to collect mutton bird eggs. One story tells of the drowning of nearly all the boys and men of a whole clan, when they were hit by a large wave or storm surge upon their return to the mainland.

The island was first sighted by Europeans in 1770 by James Cook and named Cape Dromedary, then identified as an island and named by the master of the Second Fleet convict transport Surprize after George Montagu-Dunk, 2nd Earl of Halifax.

=== Dual naming ===
After a period of community consultation from mid-2021, the island was officially assigned the dual names of Montague Island and Barunguba on 30 November 2021. Signage will place Barunguba, reflecting the importance of the Dhurga language, history and traditions. Gulaga and Najanuka / Little Dromedary Mountain were dual-named at the same time.

== Description ==
Montague Island, situated off the South Coast of New South Wales near Narooma, is the second largest island off the NSW coast after Lord Howe Island, and forms part of the Montague Island Nature Reserve. It has been classified by the National Trust as a Landscape Conservation Area for its scenic, scientific and historical values. The Montague Island Light buildings are entered on the Register of the National Estate because of the architectural quality of the tower and residences.

Montague Island is a popular tourist destination, known for its lighthouse, wildlife, most especially little penguins (Eudyptula minor), and recreational activities; managed by the NSW National Parks & Wildlife Service (NPWS). Public access to the island is restricted to guided tours conducted by the NPWS in association with private operators.

=== Lighthouse ===
A lighthouse called Montague Island Light is maintained on the island by the Australian Maritime Safety Authority. The lighthouse was designed by James Barnet and built in 1881. It was automated in 1986 and was no longer staffed in 1987. The lighthouse is 21 metres (69 ft) tall and the light is 80 metres (260 ft) above sea level with a nominal range of 20 nautical miles (37 km; 23 mi) and a geographic range of 17 nautical miles (31 km; 20 mi). The original Fresnel lens was removed in 1986 and is now on display at the Narooma Lighthouse Museum.

The next lighthouse to the north is the Burrewarra Point lighthouse. Amateur radio expeditions to the island were organised in 2010 and 2011.

== Wildlife ==
Forty-nine species of fauna have been recorded on the island by the National Parks and Wildlife Service NSW.

=== Little penguins ===
The island is home to a large colony of little penguins on the island. As the island has no foxes or feral cats, the penguins have no predators other than other seabirds and seals. With the restoration of native habitat and the provision of penguin breeding boxes, penguin numbers have increased, and there are now approximately 12,000 on the island. The female usually lays two eggs, and during a good year, both chicks will survive. The birds come ashore at dusk after feeding at sea, and visitors to the island can watch the birds from a platform near the jetty.

=== Crested terns ===
Crested terns, Sterna bergii, have brilliant white feathers covering the body while the head is completely black.

=== Shearwaters ===
Shearwaters, also known as mutton birds, nest on the island. Species recorded are:

- Puffinus bulleri (Buller's shearwater)
- Puffinus griseus (sooty shearwater)
- Puffinus pacificus (wedge-tailed shearwater)
- Puffinus tenuirostris (short-tailed shearwater)

=== Seals ===
The northern tip of the island is the seasonal home to a seal bachelor colony. Due to the site's remoteness, it is only possible for visitors to see them from a boat.

The majority of the seals are Australian fur seals, (Arctocephalus pusillus doriferus), New Zealand fur seals (Arctocephalus forsteri), subantarctic fur seals (Arctocephalus tropicalis) and Australian sea lions (Neophoca cinerea) have also been observed.

== Environmental restoration ==
Kikuyu grass is a major weed on the island. Originally introduced in the early 19th century to help feed the animals kept by the lighthouse keepers and their families, it has spread to cover most of the south island. To control it, NPWS officers poison a section, then burn it, before replanting with help from volunteers. In the less accessible areas of the northern and eastern parts, an aerial spraying program is used to manage the kikuyu where it infests shearwater breeding sites. The kikuyu is a barrier for the shearwaters and penguins, who cannot penetrate it to move or to burrow. Various native species are used to replant areas after the kikuyu grass has been controlled.

== Climate ==
Montague Island has a mild oceanic climate (Cfb) with warm summers and mild winters, with moderate rainfall year-round. Temperatures are heavily moderated by the proximity to the ocean, as shown by the narrow seasonal and diurnal range. The island is fairly sunny, featuring 83.3 clear days annually.

Climate data for Montague Island Lighthouse (36º15'S, 150º14'E, 52 m AMSL) (1968−2024)
Month	Jan	Feb	Mar	Apr	May	Jun	Jul	Aug	Sep	Oct	Nov	Dec	Year
Record high °C (°F)	41.0 (105.8)	37.2 (99.0)	36.6 (97.9)	32.3 (90.1)	26.9 (80.4)	22.0 (71.6)	24.0 (75.2)	25.9 (78.6)	33.7 (92.7)	34.1 (93.4)	34.9 (94.8)	37.2 (99.0)	41.0 (105.8)
Mean daily maximum °C (°F)	23.1 (73.6)	23.3 (73.9)	22.5 (72.5)	20.6 (69.1)	18.3 (64.9)	16.2 (61.2)	15.6 (60.1)	16.2 (61.2)	17.7 (63.9)	19.0 (66.2)	20.2 (68.4)	21.8 (71.2)	19.5 (67.1)
Mean daily minimum °C (°F)	17.7 (63.9)	18.0 (64.4)	17.2 (63.0)	15.3 (59.5)	13.2 (55.8)	11.2 (52.2)	10.2 (50.4)	10.4 (50.7)	11.5 (52.7)	12.9 (55.2)	14.4 (57.9)	16.1 (61.0)	14.0 (57.2)
Record low °C (°F)	9.5 (49.1)	5.9 (42.6)	9.6 (49.3)	6.9 (44.4)	5.7 (42.3)	3.1 (37.6)	2.1 (35.8)	2.2 (36.0)	4.5 (40.1)	6.9 (44.4)	6.7 (44.1)	8.7 (47.7)	2.1 (35.8)
Average precipitation mm (inches)	66.9 (2.63)	80.8 (3.18)	102.0 (4.02)	81.1 (3.19)	71.6 (2.82)	91.7 (3.61)	51.2 (2.02)	50.8 (2.00)	54.9 (2.16)	65.1 (2.56)	76.1 (3.00)	65.7 (2.59)	856.1 (33.70)
Average precipitation days	6.4	6.4	7.6	5.7	5.6	6.0	4.4	4.9	5.9	6.9	7.7	7.1	74.6
Average afternoon relative humidity (%)	74	75	73	69	70	68	64	64	69	71	73	74	70
Average dew point °C (°F)	16.6 (61.9)	17.0 (62.6)	16.0 (60.8)	13.5 (56.3)	11.2 (52.2)	8.6 (47.5)	7.4 (45.3)	7.8 (46.0)	9.8 (49.6)	11.4 (52.5)	13.4 (56.1)	15.1 (59.2)	12.3 (54.2)
Source: Bureau of Meteorology

== In the arts ==
In early October 2024, a show performed by the Djaadjawan Dancers, called Baranguba: A Tale of Noorooma, premiered at the River of Art festival in Batemans Bay. The performance combines modern digital technology with traditional dance, and includes animation and visual effects by Duncan Irving. Creative director Scott Baker worked with founding members of the dance group: elder Aunty Vivian, who has vivid recollections of the stories of her Walbunja people; her daughter Sharon Mason; and Sharon's daughter Arwyn Landini. Djaadjawan Dancers, which was founded in 2015 by Sharon, includes girls and women of several generations from Wallaga Lake, Narooma, and La Perouse. The performance tells the story of the mass drowning of almost an entire clan of Yuin people in a storm surge in the 19th century, as they returned to the mainland in their canoes after collecting mutton bird eggs on the island.

== See also ==
- List of islands of New South Wales
- Protected areas of New South Wales
