= Narira Creek =

Creek in New South Wales

Coordinates: 36°22′44″S 150°02′50″E

Narira Creek is a tributary of Wallaga Lake in southern New South Wales, Australia. The village of Cobargo is situated on its banks, and much of the land surrounding the creek is dairy farms.
