= Biamanga National Park =

National park in Australia

- IUCN category II (national park)
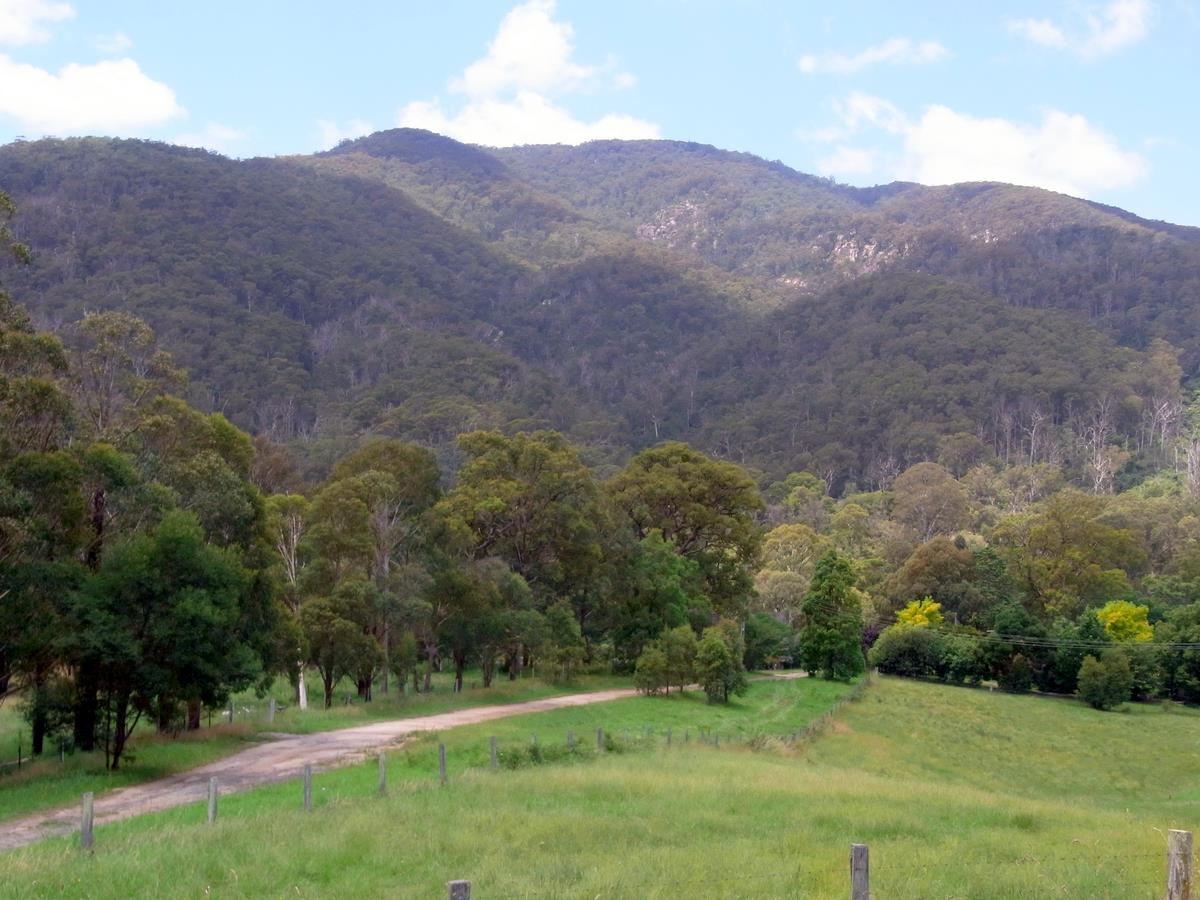
- Mumbulla Mountain from the Princes Highway, Australia

- Location within New South Wales
- Location: New South Wales
- Nearest city: Bega
- Coordinates: 36°27′04″S 149°56′31″E
- Area: 137.49 km^{2} (53.09 sq mi)
- Established: 1994
- Governing body: NSW National Parks & Wildlife Service
- Website: https://www.nationalparks.nsw.gov.au

Biamanga National Park is a protected area in New South Wales, Australia, 408 km (254 mi) south of Sydney and 40 km (25 mi) north of Bega. The park forms part of the Ulladulla to Merimbula Important Bird Area because of its importance for swift parrots.

Its name derives from Yuin elder Biamanga, aka "King Jack Mumbulla", after whom Mumbulla Mountain was also named. It is an important Aboriginal site for the Yuin people and a prominent landmark that can be seen from across the Bega Valley, also known as Biamanga. Proclaimed in 1994 and extended in 1997, the park covers 13,617 ha (33,650 acres). It is seen by the traditional owners as "part of a single cultural landscape" with the Gulaga National Park and also has cultural links to Umbarra (Merriman Island), Barunguba (Montague Island), and Dithol (Pigeon House Mountain).

In November 2021, Mumballa Mountain was ascribed the dual name of Biamanga.

== Geology ==
The mountain is the remnant of an ancient shield volcano, and granite rock formations and boulders are visible along the course of Mumbulla Creek.

== History ==
The park lies in the lands of one of the Yuin peoples, who have inhabited the area for thousands of years.

=== 20th century ===
Extensive logging was taking place in the area up until the 1970s, and in 1967 some rock was blasted with dynamite in the interests of improving television reception, and a television transmitter tower for WIN-4 was built on the mountain. After concerns had been raised by local people, the NSW Government set up an advisory committee in 1977 to investigate the woodchipping industry. In the same year, Guboo Ted Thomas, a Yuin elder, led a protest against the destruction of the forest on Mumbulla Mountain. On 15 July 1980, the government of New South Wales declared an area of around 7,540 ha (18,600 acres) an "Aboriginal place" and a "Protected Archaeological Area" under the National Parks and Wildlife Act 1974 (NSW).

The park was proclaimed in 1994 and extended in 1997.

=== 21st century ===
Further protests against logging activities occurred in 2010.

On 30 November 2021, Mumballa Mountain was ascribed the dual name of Biamanga.

== Description ==
The park covers 13,617 ha (33,650 acres). It is seen by the traditional owners as "part of a single cultural landscape" with the Gulaga National Park.

== Flora and fauna ==
There are monkey gums and ribbon gums along the creeks, and the park is home to Chef's Cap Correa, an endangered species.

The park forms part of the Ulladulla to Merimbula Important Bird Area, identified as such by BirdLife International because of its importance for swift parrots. Azure kingfishers and superb fairywrens abound in the park.

== Management ==
Biamanga has been jointly managed by the traditional owners and the NSW National Parks & Wildlife Service NSW since 2006. The traditional custodians are represented by two Local Aboriginal Land Councils, the Merrimans and Bega LALCs, which own the title to the land and lease it back to the government of New South Wales for use as a national park.

== Aboriginal significance and sites ==
The mountain and surrounds have important cultural links to Umbarra (Merriman Island), Barunguba (Montague Island), and Dithol (Pigeon House Mountain). The mountain is of particular significance to the people of Wallaga Lake.

The park contains important Aboriginal sites, in particular Biamanga, also known as Mumbulla Mountain, which is part of a large ceremonial and cultural track on the South Coast of New South Wales. It includes other Aboriginal sacred sites of particular importance to the Yuin peoples. The mountain was named after Yuin leader King Jack Mumbulla, aka Jack Mumbler, whose "tribal" name was Biamanga. King Jack would spend time communing with the ancestor spirits on the highest peak of the mountain and send smoke signals for his people to see. Initiation ceremonies were held by Yuin people at various spots on the mountain, with the last recorded one held there in 1918. It has been described as a "men's law mountain".

Independent evidence of the sacredness of the site was provided in 1964 by linguist Luise Hercus and by musician and linguist Janet Mathews but only made publicly available in the late 1970s, as well as by notes made much earlier by Alfred William Howitt, an ethnologist who attended a Yuin initiation ceremony in 1883.

The Biamanga protest site is of additional significance both to Yuin and to all other Indigenous Australians "as a representation of embodying the Australian Aboriginal campaign for land rights and Aboriginal self-determination.

== See also ==
- Protected areas of New South Wales
