= Ulladulla to Merimbula Important Bird Area =

Important Bird Area in New South Wales, Australia

Coordinates: 36°08′10″S 150°05′29″E

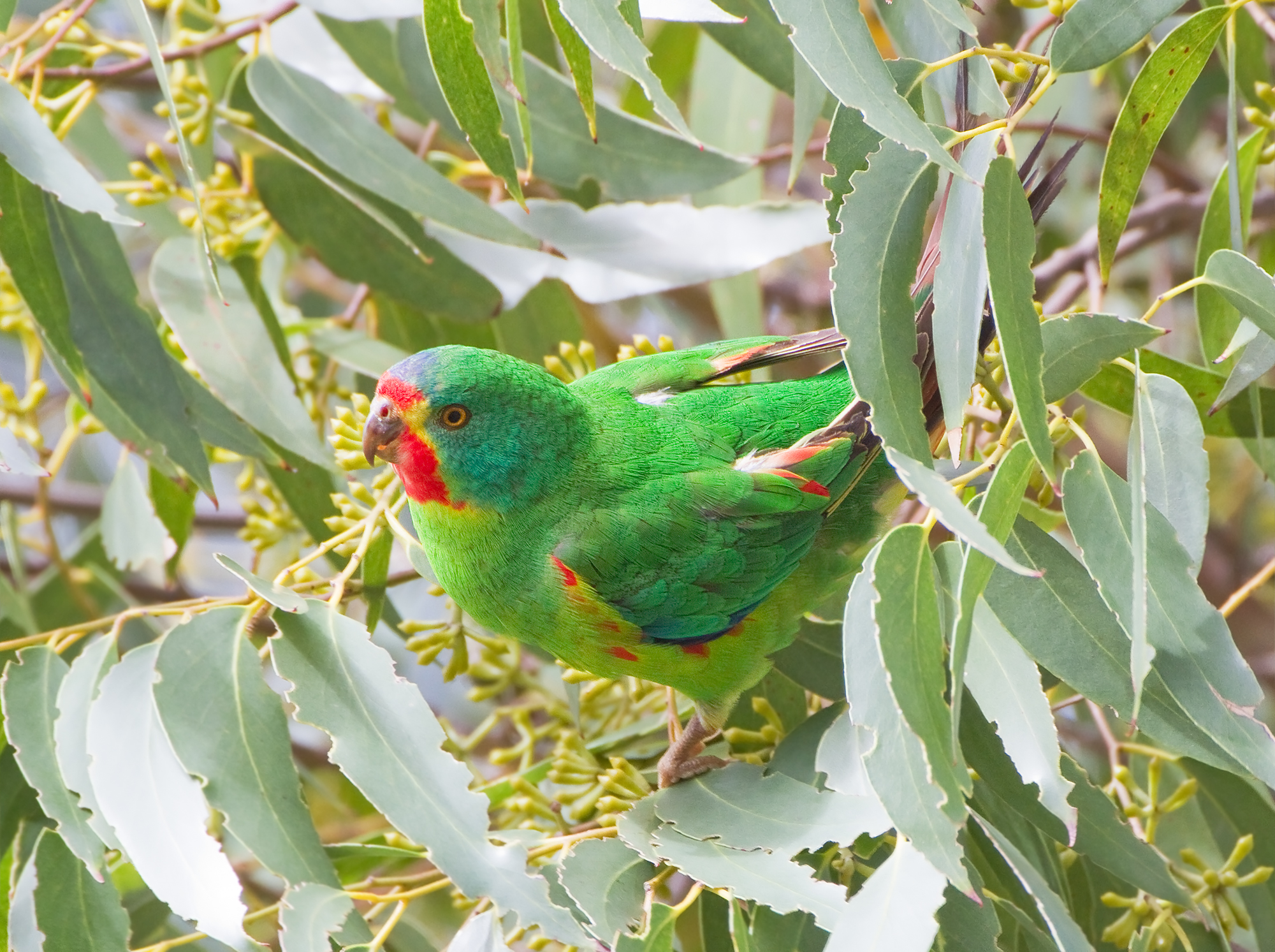
The IBA is an important site for swift parrots

The Ulladulla to Merimbula Important Bird Area comprises a strip of coastal and subcoastal land stretching along the southern coastline of New South Wales, Australia. It is an important site for swift parrots.

== Description ==
The 2100 km^{2} Important Bird Area (IBA), identified as such by BirdLife International, extends for about 250 km between the towns of Ulladulla and Merimbula and extends about 10 km inland from the coast.

It is defined by the presence of forests, or forest remnants, of spotted gum and other flowering eucalypts used by the parrots. It includes forests dominated by ironbarks and bloodwoods which are likely to support the parrots in years when the spotted gums are not flowering. Also included are large areas of pasture between forest blocks, and small areas of agriculture and urban development which contain scattered large flowering trees and remnants of native vegetation in otherwise anthropogenic landscapes.

The IBA either encompasses, or partly overlaps with, the Beowa, Biamanga, Bournda, Clyde River, Eurobodalla, Gulaga, Meroo, Mimosa Rocks, Murramarang and South East Forest National Parks.
