= Wallaga Lake National Park =

Former national park, now part of Gulaga National Park, New South Wales, Australia

- IUCN category II (national park)
- Location within New South Wales
- Location: New South Wales
- Coordinates: 36°22′18″S 150°01′46″E
- Area: 12.37 km^{2} (4.78 sq mi)
- Established: 26 May 1972
- Governing body: National Parks and Wildlife Service (New South Wales)

Wallaga Lake National Park is a former national park in New South Wales, 296 km (184 mi) south-west of Sydney and north of Bermagui. It now forms part of a greater Gulaga National Park.

In 2001, as part of the Southern Comprehensive Regional Forest Agreement and at the request of Yuin people, Gulaga National Park was created out of the existing Wallaga Lake National Park, Goura Nature Reserve, and Mt Dromedary Flora Reserve.

In May 2006, ownership to this former National Park, plus the rest of the Gulaga National Park, was restored to the area's traditional owners, in whom legal tenure was vested (in trust) as part of an agreement signed by New South Wales Environment Minister Bob Debus and representatives for the Yuin people.

The name of the park derived from Wallaga Lake, which is of cultural significance as well as being a source of food for the Yuin people. The black duck, Umbarra, who lives here, is the totem of the Yuin-Monaro people.

== See also ==
- Protected areas of New South Wales (Australia)
