= Gulaga / Mount Dromedary =

Mountain in New South Wales, Australia

Mount Dromedary / Gulaga
- Mount Dromedary
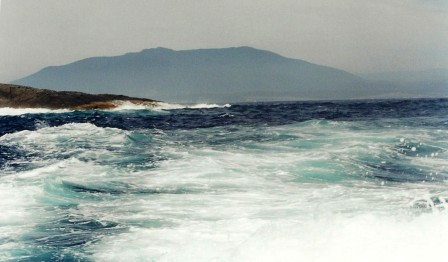
- Mount Dromedary / Gulaga from Barunguba / Montague Island

Highest point
- Elevation: 806 m (2,644 ft)
- Coordinates: 36°18′S 150°02′E

Geography
- Location within New South Wales
- Location: South Coast region of New South Wales, Australia

Geology
- Rock age: Cretaceous
- Mountain type: Igneous extinct volcano
- Last eruption: 60 million years ago

Gulaga, dual-named as Mount Dromedary and also referred to as Mount Gulaga, is a mountain located in the south coast region of New South Wales, Australia. It rises above the village of Central Tilba and is within the Gulaga National Park. At its highest point, it measures 806 metres (2,644 ft) above sea level.

Najanuka / Little Dromedary Mountain, also dual-named, lies 6.37 km (3.96 mi) to the south-east, and both mountains are of great significance to the local Aboriginal people, the Dhurga-speaking Yuin people. The area features the southernmost subtropical rainforest in New South Wales.

== History ==
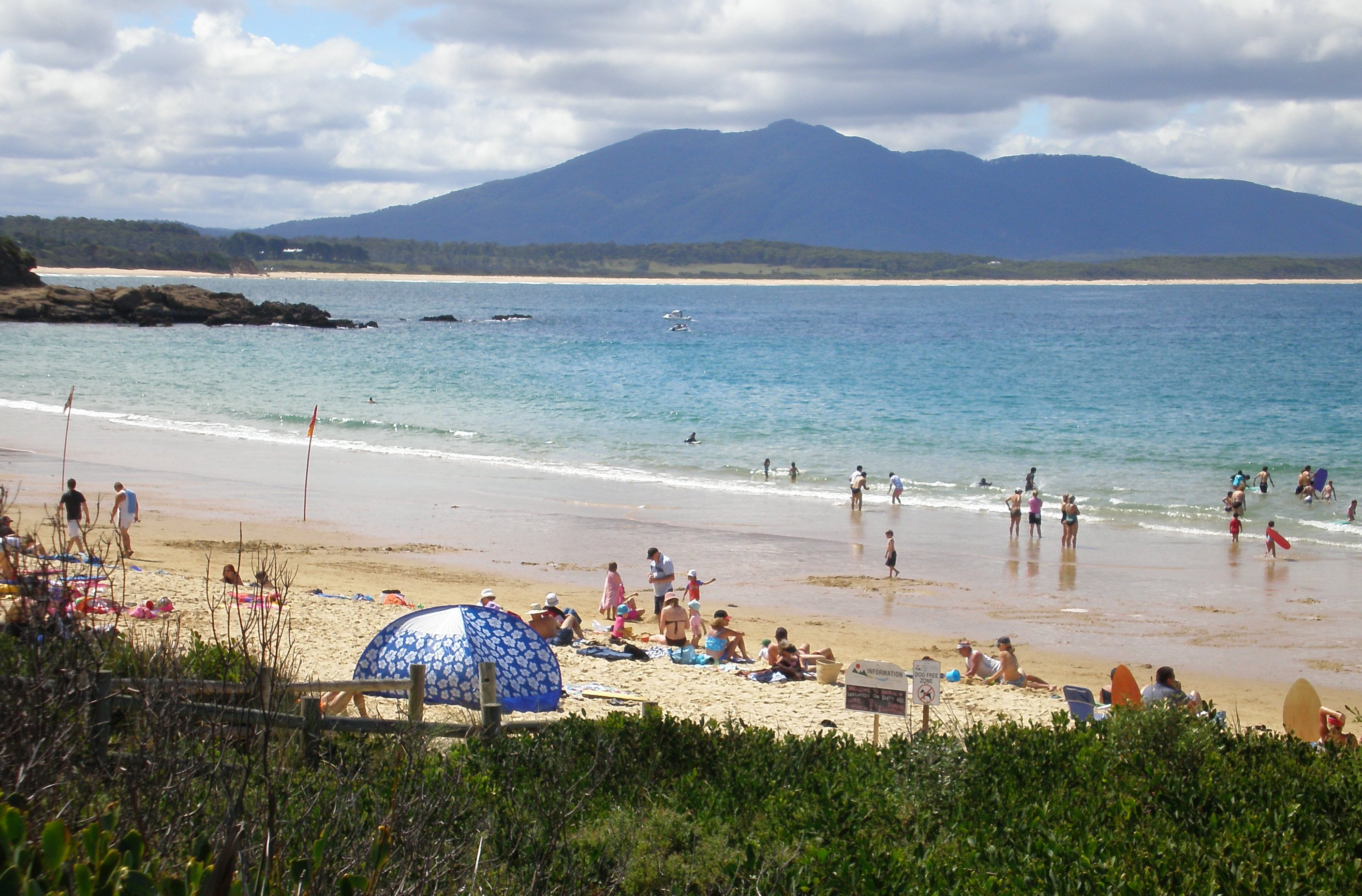
Gulaga from Bermagui

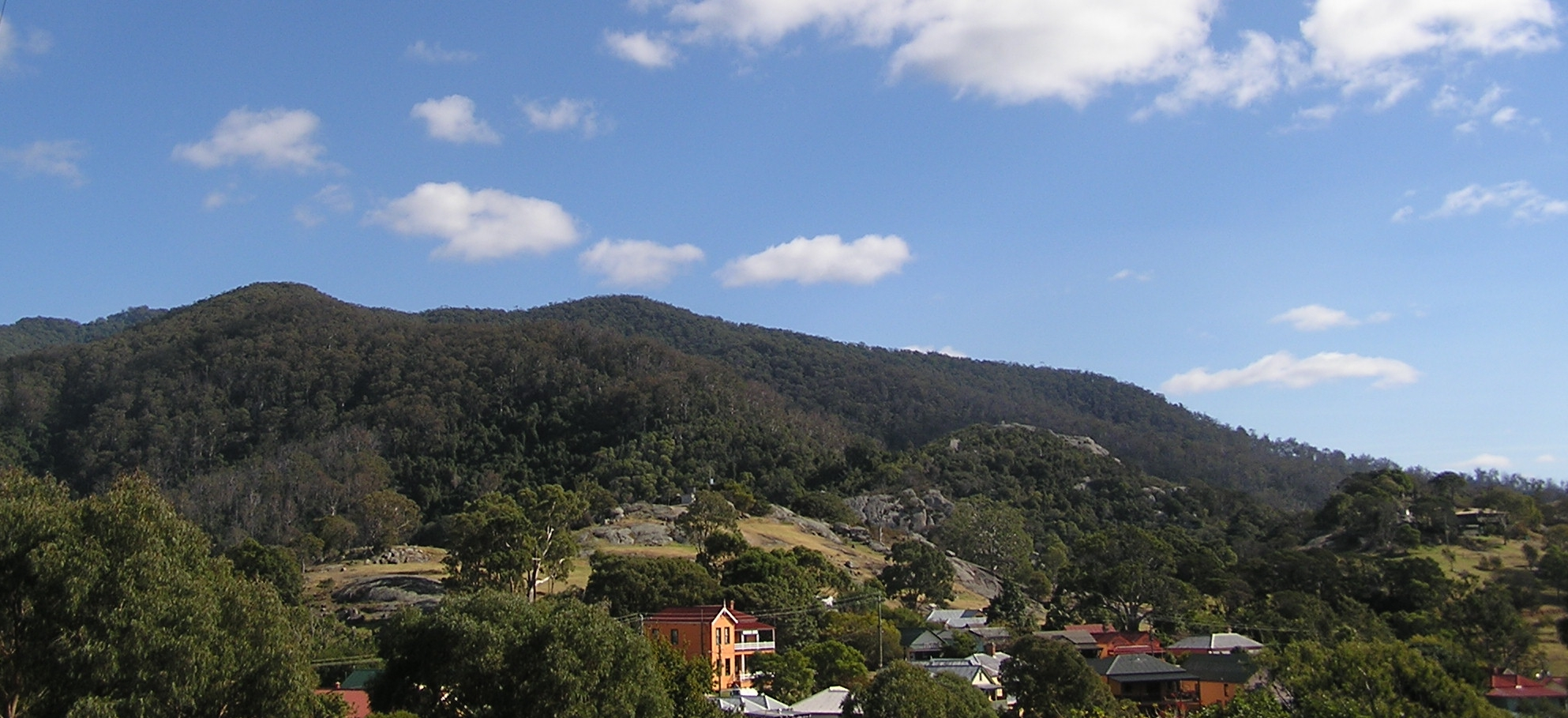
Gulaga and Central Tilba

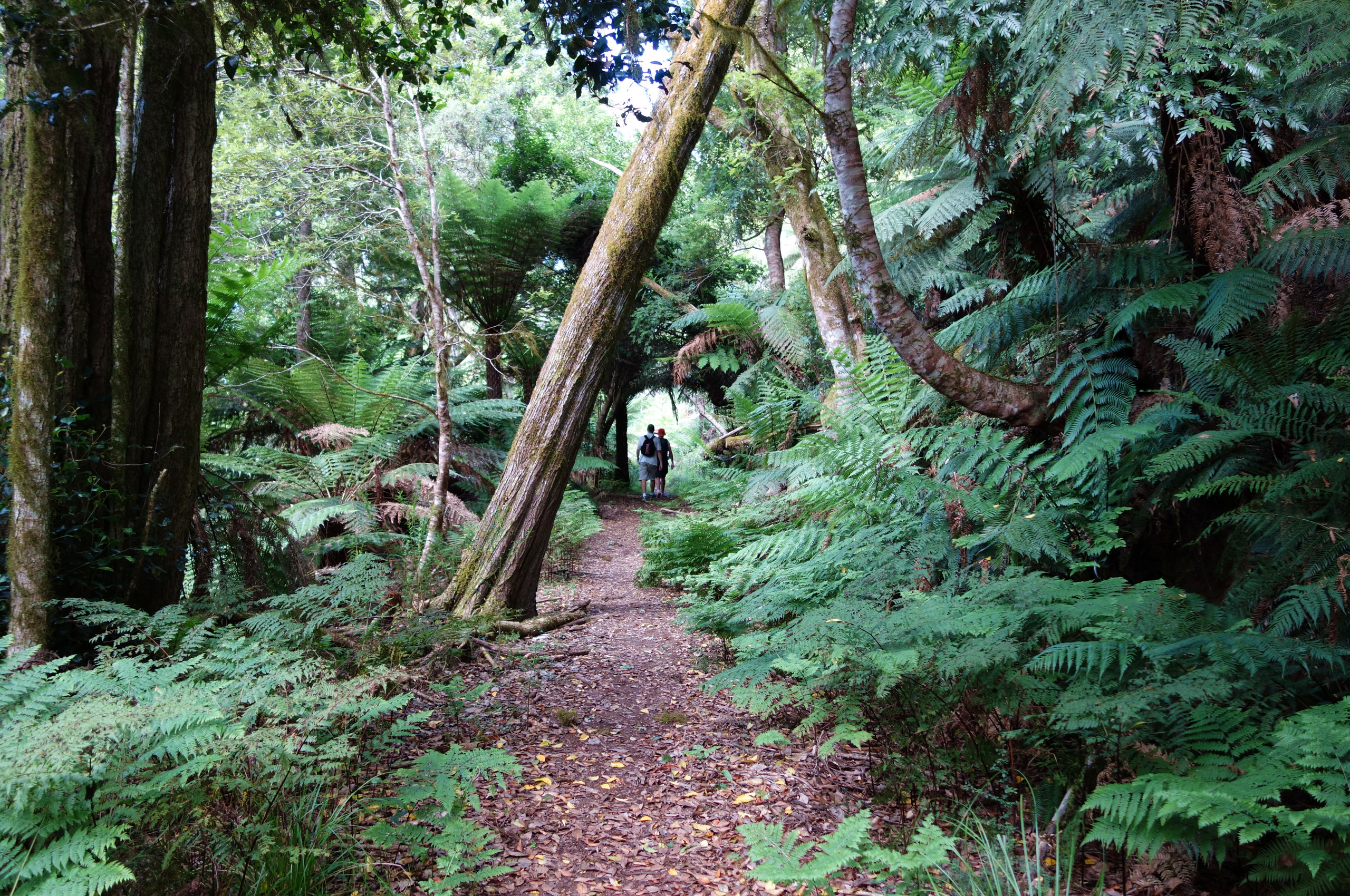
The Rainforest Track at Gulaga

=== Aboriginal significance ===
Gulaga is the place of ancestral origin within the mythology of the Yuin people, the Aboriginal people of the area. Gulaga itself symbolises the mother and provides a basis for Aboriginal spiritual identity; the mountain as well as the surrounding area holds particular significance for Aboriginal women. For the Yuin people it is seen as a place of cultural origin. The mountain is regarded as a symbolic mother-figure providing the basis for the people's spiritual identity. Gulaga, the mother, has two sons: Barunguba, also known as Montague Island, and Najanuka, named Little Dromedary by Europeans. The story tells that her second son was not allow to go far from home, as his elder brother did, and that Gulaga can see both of her sons in the distance.

=== European discovery and mining ===
The first Europeans to sight the mountain were the crew of Captain Cook's ship, HMS Endeavour on 21 April 1770. Endeavour passed the mountain at a distance of 24 km (15 mi) offshore. Cook named it "Mount Dromedary", as its figure reminded him of the hump of a camel.

In the mid-1800s Mount Dromedary, became a prominent site of gold mining. Rev. W.B. Clarke first found traces of alluvium gold in Dignams Creek in 1852. Gold mining then became a common activity in the area. A significant amount of gold was found in deposits along streams coming from Gulaga's slopes. Between 1878 and 1920 approximately 603 kilograms (1,329 lb) of gold was found in its slopes. Near the crest of Gulaga, reefs were discovered in 1877 that allowed for gold mineralisation. These pyrite-rich veins, ranging in size from 15 to 45 centimetres (5.9 to 17.7 in), were mined by the Mount Dromedary Gold Mining Company mainly between 1878 and 1910.

=== 21st century ===
In May 2006 the Gulaga National Park, incorporating the former Wallaga Lake National Park, was handed back to its traditional owners, the Yuin people, in a historic agreement signed by the NSW Environment Minister and the Yuin people. The agreement also included Biamanga National Park, which incorporates Mumbulla Mountain, the "men's mountain".

After a period of community consultation from mid-2021, The mountain was officially assigned the dual names of Gulaga and Mount Dromedary on 30 November 2021. Signage would place Gulaga first and the European name underneath it, reflecting the importance of the Dhurga language, history and traditions. At the same time, Little Dromedary Mountain was dual-named Najanuka / Little Dromedary Mountain, and the island Barunguba / Montague Island.

== Geology ==
Gulaga / Mount Dromedary is an extinct volcano, part of a complex covering about 40 km^{2} (15 sq mi), with the first of several eruptions occurring about 94 million years ago during the Mid Cretaceous. Its eruptions formed both Najanuka / Little Dromedary to the east and Baranguba/ Montague Island. Back then it would have been nearly 2,000 m (6,600 ft) higher than its current 797 m (2,615 ft) above sea level, with foothills stretching to Tuross Head. What remains today is the inner core of the original volcano. It has been dormant since end of the Cretaceous (65 million years ago).

Gulaga is thus an igneous rock complex, known as Mount Dromedary Igneous Complex. It comprises a group of igneous and extrusive rocks of the Shoshonite association. There are also Ordovician sediments to the east and west of the villages of Central Tilba and Tilba Tilba. The mountain is composed of banatite ("a rock of intermediate composition between quartz diorite and quartz monzonite". There is an outer layer of monzonite around the banatite core main core of Gulaga, probably emplaced by the vertical movement of magma which created intrusion into the surrounding Ordovician sediments. There are dykes within the complex, mainly composed of dolerite or quartz feldspar.

At its highest point, Gulaga measures 806 metres (2,644 ft) above sea level.

== Activities ==
Gulaga is located within the 4,673-hectare (11,550-acre) Gulaga National Park and the area serves as a site for public activity as well as a place of significance for the Aboriginal peoples. The national park provides walkways along the mining roads, which provide views of the coastal lakes. The hike from Tilba to the summit is approximately 11 kilometres (6.8 mi); taking about a half a day to complete. Though it is steep in a few places along the way, it is a fairly leisurely hike, requiring no special hiking equipment.

Access to the park is approximately 10 kilometres (6.2 mi) north of Bermagui. The lakes can be accessed by boat, which can be rented from Regatta Point or Beauty Point.

== Gallery ==
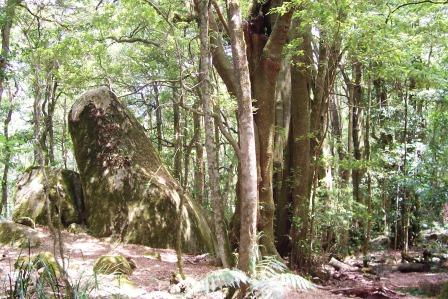
Syenite boulder and pinkwood rainforest

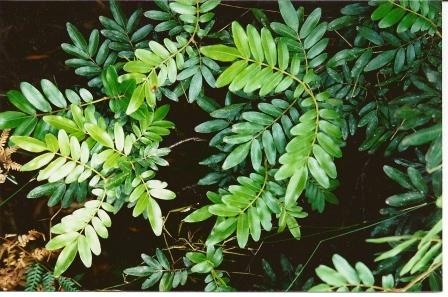
Pinkwood at Gulaga Summit

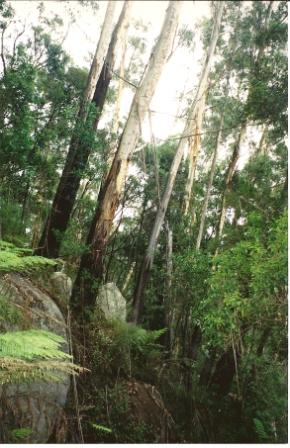
White ash on Gulaga

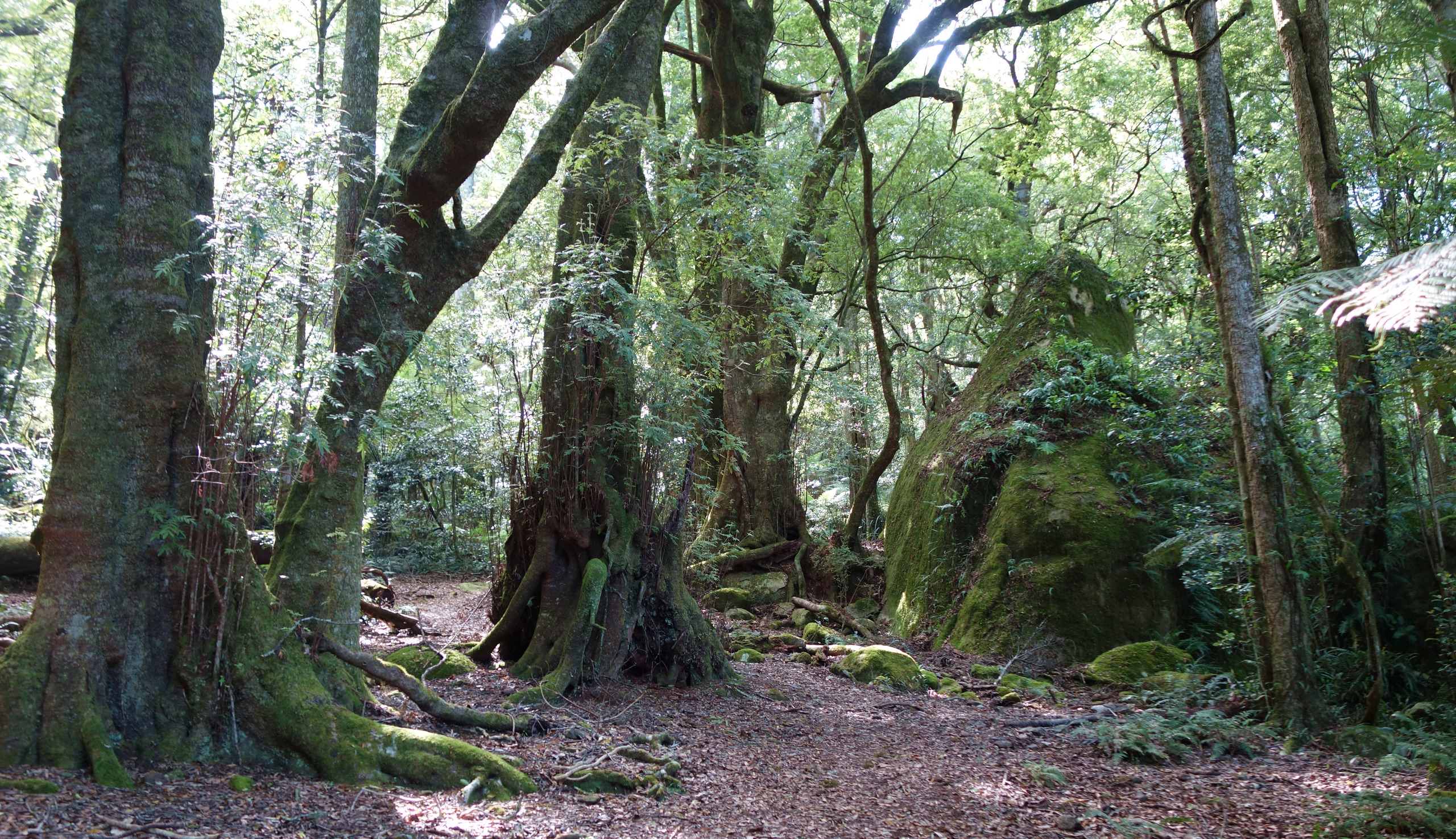
Temperate rainforest near the summit

== See also ==
- List of mountains in Australia § New South Wales
