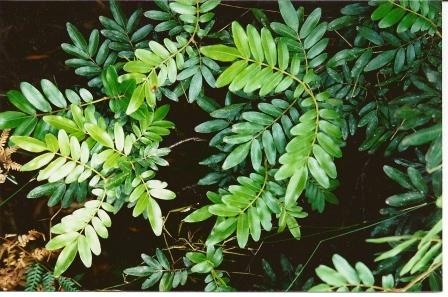
- Pinkwood at Gulaga Mountain summit

Scientific classification
- Kingdom: Plantae
- Clade: Tracheophytes
- Clade: Angiosperms
- Clade: Eudicots
- Clade: Rosids
- Order: Oxalidales
- Family: Cunoniaceae
- Genus: Eucryphia
- Species: E. moorei

Binomial name
- Eucryphia moorei F.Muell.

= Eucryphia moorei =

Species of tree

Eucryphia moorei, commonly known as pinkwood, plumwood, or eastern leatherwood is a tree found in southeastern New South Wales, Australia. It also occurs just over the border at the Howe Range in Victoria. Pinkwood is the dominant tree species of cool-temperate rainforests of southeastern NSW. Young plants often grow as hemiepiphytes.

== Description ==
Eucryphia moorei can grow to 30 metres in height. Leaves are pinnate, mostly 5–15 cm long, with usually 5–13 leaflets but they are often reduced to 3 on flowering branches. Leaflets are oblong, 1–7 cm long, mostly 5–15 mm wide, margins are entire, lamina is leathery, upper surface is dark green and ± glabrous, lower surface is white-tomentose; petiole is 10–30 mm long; lateral leaflets are sessile.

== Gallery ==
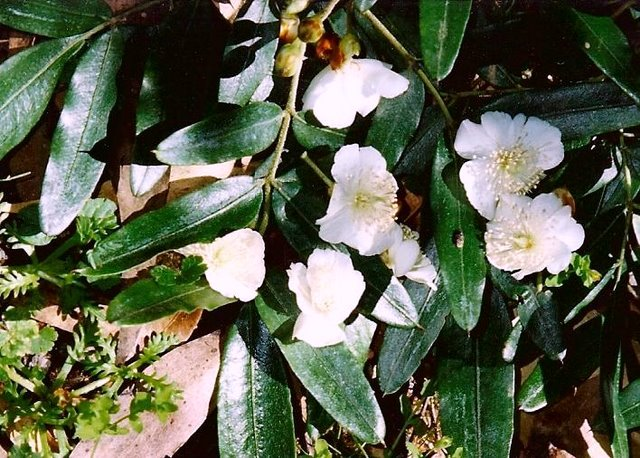
Eucryphia moorei, Monga National Park

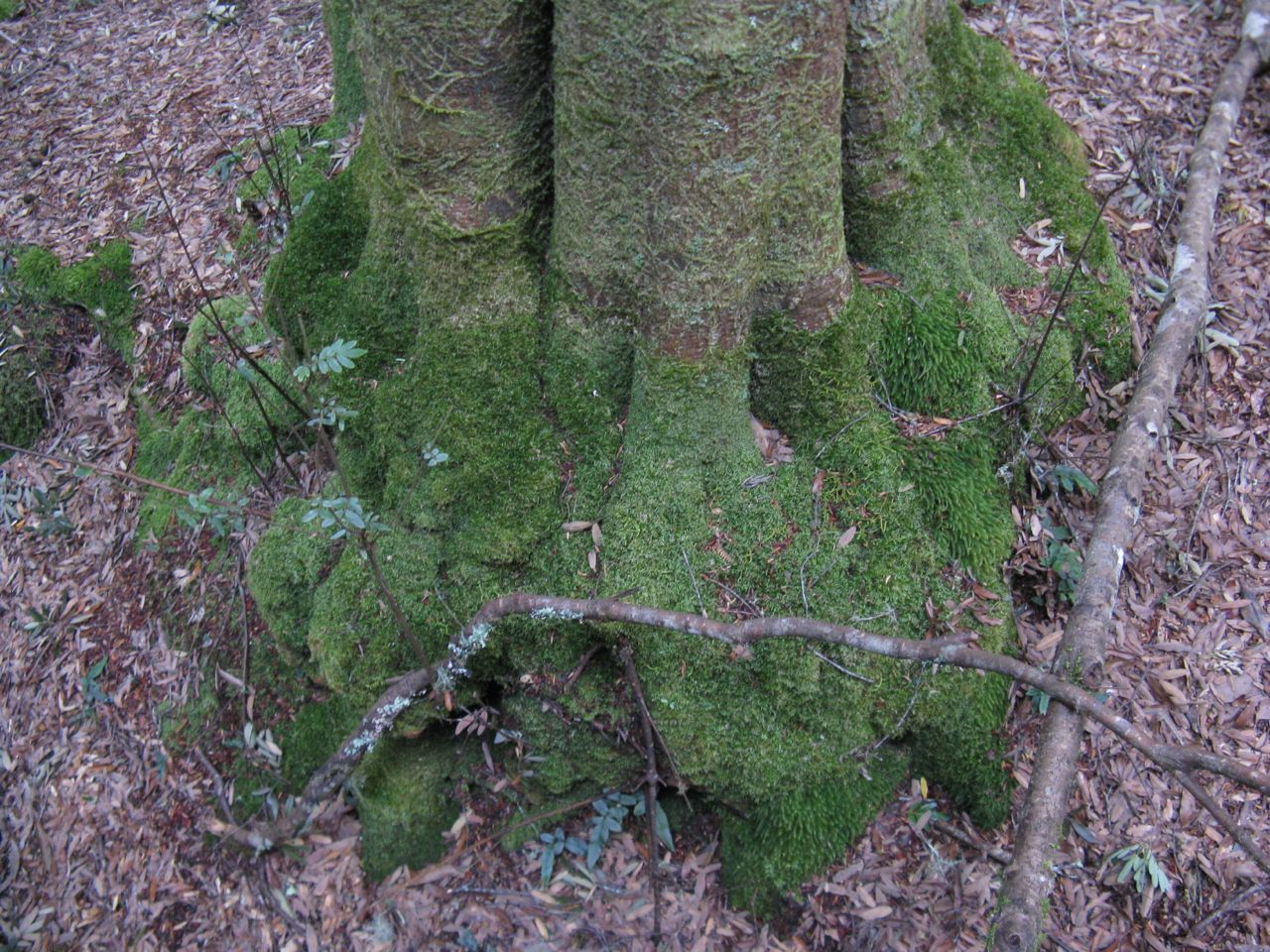
Eucryphia moorei, Monga National Park

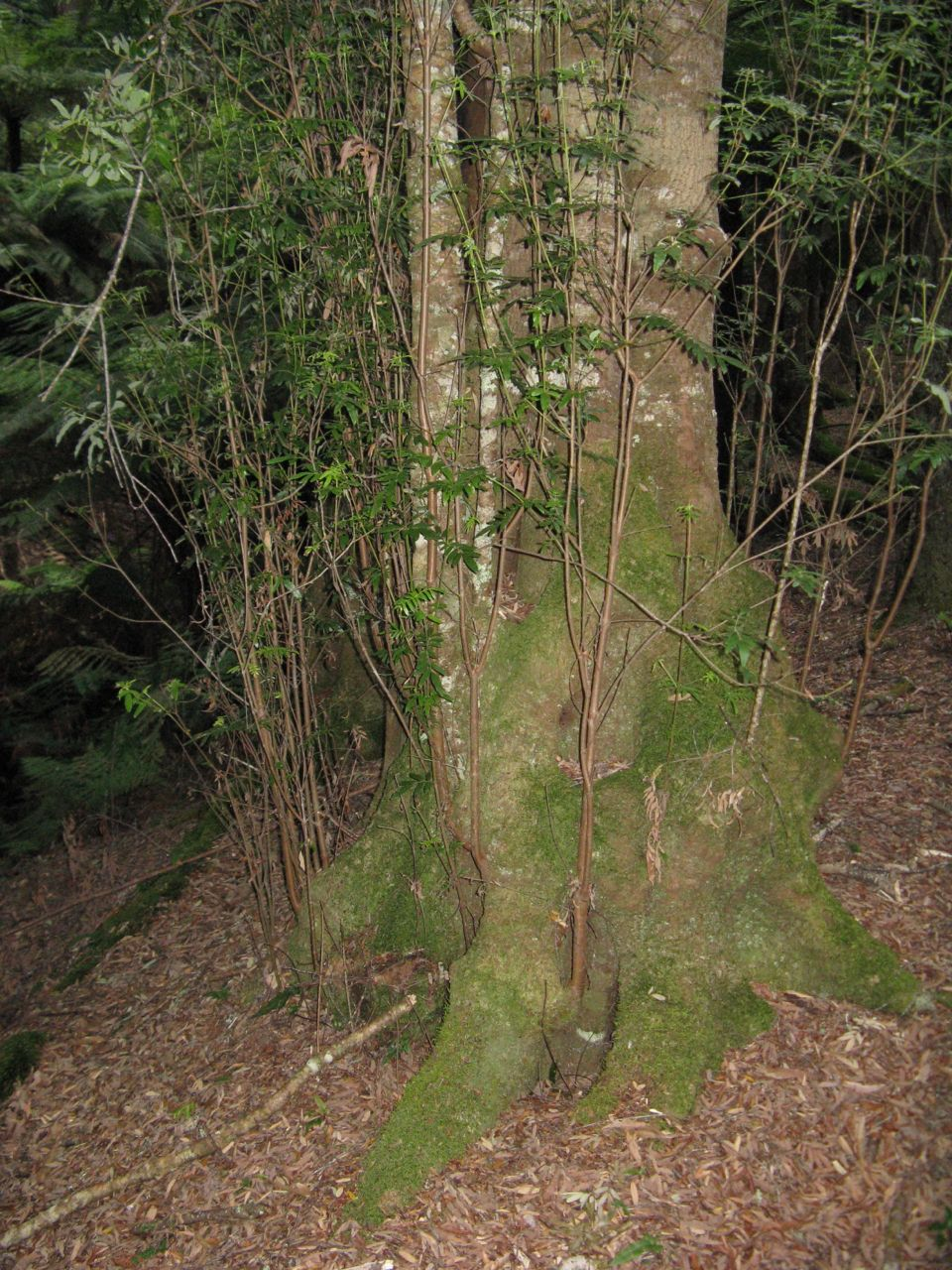
Eucryphia moorei, Monga National Park
