= Yuin =

Aboriginal Australian people of New South Wales

Yuin people
- Aka: Thurga (Tindale); Dhawa (AIATSIS), Dhu Dhurga (SIL)
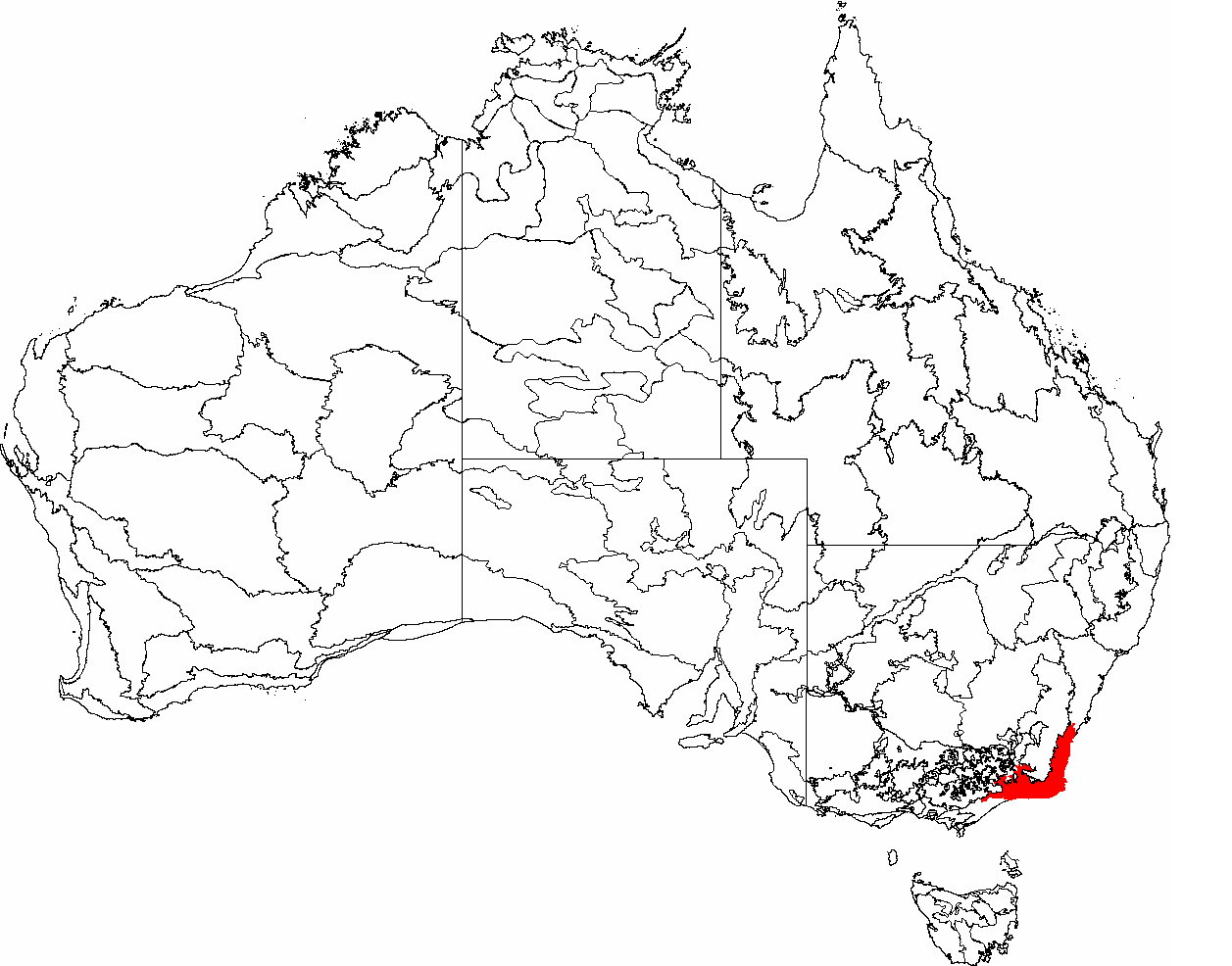
- South east corner bioregion

Hierarchy
- Language family: Pama–Nyungan
- Language branch: Yuin–Kuric
- Language group: Yuin (shared word for man) (a.k.a. Thurga) (shared word for no)
- Group dialects: Dhurga: Djiringanj (Tindale); Thaua (Tindale); Walbanga (Tindale); Wandandian (Tindale)

Area
- Bioregion: South east corner
- Location: South Coast (NSW)
- Coordinates: 36°30′S 149°45′E

Notable individuals
- Guboo Ted Thomas; Henry (Harry) Penrith; Burnum Burnum; Max Dulumunmun Harrison

The Yuin nation, also spelt Djuwin, is a group of Australian Aboriginal peoples from the South Coast of New South Wales. All Yuin people share ancestors who spoke, as their first language, one or more of the Yuin language dialects. Sub-groupings of the Yuin people are made on the basis of language and other cultural features; groups include the Brinja or Bugelli-manji, Wandandian, Jerrinja, Budawang, Yuin-Monaro, Djiringanj, Walbunja, and more. They have a close linguistic and cultural association with the Thaua and Dharawal people.

== Name and identity ==
The ethnonym Yuin ("man") was selected by early Australian ethnographer, Alfred Howitt, to denote two distinct nations of New South Wales, namely the Djiringanj and the Thaua. (Note: "In the early days of white contact there was a compulsion to try and find major units in Australia of the kinds familiar to the people of Europe. Layman recorders were not satisfied to accept the autonomous tribal units that they were in contact with as the largest ones present. Soon several tribes extending along the south coast of New South Wales were treated together as the 'Yuin,' because they were all familiar with the word as meaning 'man.'." (Tindale 1974, p. 156)) In Howitt's work, the Yuin were divided into northern (Kurial-Yuin) and southern (Gyangal-Yuin) branches.

The term "Yuin" is commonly used by South Coast Aboriginal people to describe themselves, although in a 2016 New South Wales native title application for land overlapping Yuin country, "South Coast people" is used. The name is also spelt Djuwin and Juwin.

The native title application depends on establishing the South Coast Aboriginal people as a distinct and continuing group that has existed since colonisation. South Coast Aboriginal people have identified 59 apical ancestors that lived during the settlement of the region in 1810–1830; current South Coast Aboriginal people are either descended from these ancestors or integrated into families that descend from these ancestors.

In 2018, the National Native Title Tribunal ruled that the South Coast people represent a "single cohesive kinship population" going back to colonisation, governed by shared rules, with a "single system of religion" centred on the figure Darhumulan, a marine-based economy, sacred sites that continue to be recognised, exogamous marriage rules, and a male initiation ceremony called Bunan (remembered, but not practised since 1909 ).

== Language ==
Dialects of the Yuin language group include the Djiringanj, Thaua, Walbanga, Wandandian and Dhurga languages, from north of Moruya River to Nowra.

== Country ==
Map prepared by National Native Title Tribunal of the area of the South Coast people native title claim

The country the Yuin ancestors occupied, used, and enjoyed reached across from Cape Howe to the Shoalhaven River and inland to the Great Dividing Range. Their descendants claim rights to be recognised as the traditional owners of the land and water from Merimbula to the southern head of the sea entrance of the Shoalhaven River. The Yuin people consisted of 12 clans at the time of European arrival in the area.

The Yuin groups include:

- Walbanga, or Walbunja, north of the present-day Moruya River
- Murramurang, north of Deua River to south of Lake Conjola
- Murramarang
- Dyiringanj, or Djiringanj, from Corunna Lake, south to Bega and west to the top of the range
- Brinja from Djiringanj country or Corunna Lake, New South Wales to Moruya River to Nadjongbilla and along Shoalhaven River to Jembaicumbene Ck.
- Budawang
- Yuin-Monaro

The Yuin are set out as follows by Howitt (1904):

- Yuin
  - Guyangal Yuin (South-Yuin)
    - (1) Thauaira, east of Mallacoota Inlet.
    - (2) Tadera-manji,- in the Bega district.
    - (3) Bugelli-manji, in the Moruya district
  - Kurial-Yuin (North-Yuin)
    - (4) Name not ascertained, in the Braidwood district.
    - (5) Name not ascertained, in the Ulladulla district.
    - (6) Gurungatta-manji, in the Lower Shoalhaven River district.

Contemporary sources report that the Brinja-Yuin people's traditional lands extended along the "Lagoon Coast", south of the Moruya River to South Kianga, or further south to the Wagonga Inlet at Narooma. The Bugelli-manji people lived around Moruya.

During the push in the late 1970s and early 1980s to protect Mumbulla Mountain, Wallaga Lake people led by Guboo Ted Thomas described the Yuin tribe as "shar[ing] the one walkabout from Mallacoota in the south to the Shoalhaven River in the north".

In 2016, 12 applicants representing South Coast Aboriginals lodged a native title claim in the Federal Court for Yuin country in New South Wales. The claim is made by 52 family groups and was approved by more than 500 Aboriginal people. The claim extends into the ocean and includes traditional fishing rights. In 2018, the registration was accepted.

== History ==
The population before 1788 has been estimated at about 11,000 between Cape Howe and Batemans Bay. The population was reduced to only 600 by the mid nineteenth century due to smallpox epidemics in 1789 and 1830, as well as tribal battles and the spread of venereal disease from whalers.

The Eurobodalla Shire Council signed a Local Agreement with the Northern Yuin people in 1998. In 2001, a Memorandum of Understanding was signed between the Bega, Eden and Merrimans Local Aboriginal Land Councils, the native title holders and the Bega Valley Shire Council.

The Yuin at Twofold Bay near Eden had mutual co-operation with the killer whales of Eden.

== Places ==
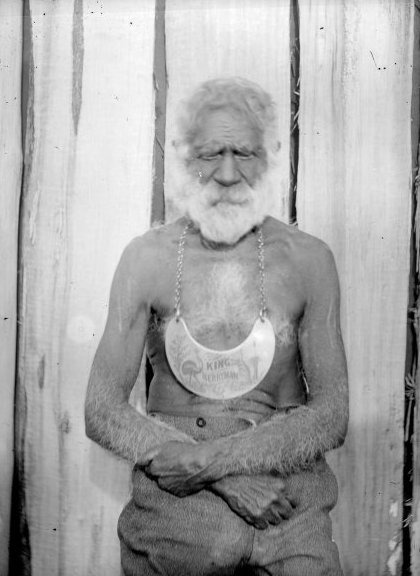
King Merriman, Umbarra, with King plate photographed about 1900

The Yuin are considered as the traditional owners of Wallaga Lake land. The former Wallaga Lake National Park is incorporated into Gulaga National Park. Gulaga Mountain, in the Gulaga National Park, is described by Aboriginal people as the place of ancestral origin for Yuin people. Gulaga itself symbolises the mother, and has several sacred sites relating to places where the women went for storytelling and to participate in ceremonies and to give birth.

Umbarra, aka Merriman Island, in Wallaga Lake is a particularly sacred place for the Yuin people. On 25 November 1977, it was the first place in New South Wales to be declared an Aboriginal Heritage site by the New South Wales National Parks and Wildlife Service (NPWS). The island was named after Umbarra, aka King Merriman, leader of the Yuin, who died in 1904. His wife was Queen Narelle.

Mumbulla Mountain, located in the middle of Bega Valley Shire, was named after "King" Jack Mumbulla, a leader of the Yuin people. Mumbulla Mountain is the central place of significance in Biamanga National Park, and is known for its importance in men's initiation ceremonies.

On 6 May 2006 the freehold titles to Gulaga and Biamanga National Parks were handed back to the Yuin people by the New South Wales Government. Freehold title of Gulaga National Park are held in trust for the Aboriginal owners by Merrimans and Wagonga Local Aboriginal Land Councils, while that of Biamanga are held in trust by Merrimans and Bega Local Aboriginal Land Councils. Both parks are co-managed by the traditional owners and the NPWS.

Barunguba / Montague Island (dual-named in November 2021) is known to the Yuin people as Barunguba (sometimes spelt Barranguba). Barunguba is regarded as being the son of Gulaga, along with Najanuga; Barunguba being the oldest son and allowed out to sea, whereas Najanuga had to stay close to his mother. This is a Djiringanj, version

Barunguba Story, as told by Ruby Henry when looking after Reid children in Vulcan St. Moruya

"Dyillagongarmi, pronounced Dilly gone gar me. Brooidore, the great sky spirit who was watching, then intervened. Brooidore took the two turtles from the shore, then turned them into stones, placed them offshore with the two turtles facing each other, and pushed them together with only one head.

Barunguba, the great Brinja elder, saw this with his own eyes. Brooidore then placed water around the two turtles that were head to head and would not allow sea turtles ever again to come ashore or lay eggs in the Burgali.

Barunguba, the Brinja elder, saw this with his own eyes, and as Brooidore was watching Barunguba, Brooidore called out to him, "Why are you watching?" Did you tell Dyillagongarmi I was watching Darama when he made the coastline.

Then Dyillagongarmi spoke from the sky (darel) like thunder (mirribi). I will call the stone turtles Barunguba. You, Barunguba the elder, will continually watch over the coastline to make sure turtles only travel up and down the coast and never come ashore again while you, Barunguba the great elder, are alive.

Then Dyillagongarmi said, Barunguba, you will always find turtles in your fresh waterways, and Brooidore will never be able to turn turtles into stone again while you watch over the shores.

The principle could be said to be “someone is always watching,” but I have never heard the dreamtime story of Barunguba referred to this way. This is the Brinja story, Barunguba is on Brinja country.".

== Kinship and marriage ==
The exact arrangement of Yuin kinship before colonisation is not clear, although early ethnographers reported that they did not have a moiety or section system (where a people are split into two or four intermarrying groups). Instead, Yuin kinship would have involved "extensive networks of relatedness within and between exogamous intermarrying country groups". Yuin men had more than one wife in the case of Coorall had 14 wives and Kian had 12 wives, including bush wives. The main reason was death came quickly if you sustained an injury and marriage was more about survival of the tribe than the present days view. A bush wife is a wife given to an elder at a major ceremonially event.

Marriage should be exogamous between family groups, as determined by the spiritual connections of those families. However, these family connections are no longer a "a strong element" of contemporary Yuin kinship. To the extent that they are known, family spiritual connections are inherited, and there are still some Yuin families associated with certain animals. Yuin typically do not marry people with connections to the same personal or family beings (see below, Relationship with the natural world).

=== Skin groups ===
Multiple Yuin have described a system of "skin groups" (subsets of language groups) that would "govern social behaviours and interaction, determining those with whom individuals can (and cannot) talk, marry, trade, as well as identifying their natural enemies". However, most Yuin these days are "not familiar with this level of the system".

== Relationship with the natural world ==
Yuin people had, and in many cases still have, spiritual, mutual relationships with an aspect of the natural world. These spiritual connections are represented by animals, and these connections come with obligations and relationships, not just to the animal but to other humans and to places and things associated with that animal.

Anthropologist Alfred William Howitt briefly described Yuin spiritual connections with animals in 1904, in The native tribes of south-east Australia. Howitt, and other early ethnographers, used the Ojibwe term "totem" to describe these spiritual connections, as they saw commonalities between Aboriginal Australian spiritual connections to animals and those of First Nations and Native Americans. The term is not widely used by Yuin and the term "totemism" is not well-regarded by them, but Yuin authors often use the term "totem" in works for wider audiences.

Yuin believe these spiritual animals to have been made in the Dreamtime by an ancestral creator, although not all spiritual animals have Dreamtime stories associated with them (or those stories have been lost). Dreamtime stories for the creation of the diving birds and the black swan are recorded by Susan Dale Donaldson.

The best known Yuin spiritual animals are the Pacific black duck (Umbarra) and the Black swan. The Black Duck was the moojingarl of King Merriman, who is named Umbarra after it, and a duck-shaped island in Wallaga Lake is named Merriman Island. Umbarra was believed to communicate with black ducks, who would warn him of danger.

In 2003, Rose, James and Watson identified six levels of "interacting beings" spoken of by the Yuin, also described as "families within families" by Yuin woman Mary Duroux. The six families described (and, in brackets, the alternative terms used by Yuin elder Randall Mumbler) are:

1. Beings interacting with the Yuin nation ("tribal totem")
2. Beings interacting with tribes or named groups (N/A);
3. Beings interacting with families (operating like clans) ("family totem");
4. Beings interacting with skin groups (N/A);
5. Initiation totems and names ("ceremonial totem");
6. Beings interacting with specific individuals ("personal totem"; also called "individual totem" or moojingarl in other sources).

A Yuin's responsibilities to these beings, and their responsibilities to that Yuin, varied depending on the level of the relationship. For example, while a Yuin is expected to protect animals of their moojingarl, Guboo Ted Thomas described no obligation to protect the black duck as his relationship with it was only on a "nation" level.

Donaldson also briefly mentions "gender totems".

Some animals, including the Black Duck, can have spiritual connections with Yuin at any of these levels. Yuin typically do not eat animals with which they have a spiritual connection, which are considered part of their extended family – restrictions which may extend to related animals (all ducks, for example, because of the Black Duck connection).

Yuin elder Randall Mumbler describes the significance of the different levels of connection:

There are personal, family, tribal, and ceremonial totems. The ceremonial totem gives you status if you've been through the law, the tribal totem connects you with everyone in your tribe, the family totem connects you with your family and the personal totem is your best mate

Susan Dale Donaldson has assembled a preliminary list of Yuin spiritual connections, consisting of 20 birds, two marine animals (bream and whale), seven terrestrial mammals and three reptiles.

=== Specific animals ===
The black duck is the symbol for the Yuin people, and may be particularly significant for Yuin who may not have a moojingarl or do not know their family's spiritual connection due to dispossession and assimilation. Yuin have a spiritual connection (but not a "totem" one) with Mount Gulaga, believed to be the origin of the Yuin. From Gulaga, Merriman Island is visibly duck-shaped.

Genealogist and researcher Dave Tout, a relative of King Merriman, has identified at least four groups and their spiritual connection:

- Wadthi-Wadthi (northern group): Lyrebird
- Wadthi-Wadthi (southern group): Spotted owl
- Yeerimbine (south of Twofold Bay): Killer whale
- Wandian (Mount Sassafrass): Eagle

=== Beings interacting with families ===
In 1904, the ethnologist Howitt described Yuin "totems" as patrilineal (i.e. inherited from the father), and gave budjan, mura and jimbir as Yuin terms for these "totems". Errors in Howitt's account that have been identified by contemporary Yuin include his use of budjan for "totem" (it just means "bird") and that inheritance was only patrilineal, as there is also matrilineal inheritance of family connections.

There are still some Yuin families associated with certain animals. Many family connections are with birds – in which case they may be called "family birds".

=== Initiation totems and names ===
Howitt described a "medicine man" bestowing a "second totem" (additional to a family "totem") on a Yuin man at his initiation. Contemporary Yuin describe the process as a "discussion" between elder and initiand about which animal is personally significant, rather than a bestowal, and variously describe the spiritual connection as a "secret" or "ceremonial" one, or as a "personal" one.

Donaldson says that ceremonial connections are earned by Yuin who "attain a certain ritual status". Many ceremonial relationships are with fish. Ceremonial connections are associated to the "specialised powers" that "clever people" have, such as Umbarra's power to turn into a whirlwind.

Yuin women may receive up to four new names during their spiritual training. The first two level names are open but the third and fourth are secret. However, unlike other kinship relationships described here, the names are not those of animals; examples include plant names, sacred place names, spirit women names and the word for "female warrior".

=== Beings interacting with individuals ===
The Yuin word for a personal spiritual connection with an animal, moojingarl, literally means "my friend" (from moodji, friend, and gaarl, my) and involves reciprocity with that animal and a place or places where it is commonly found. Yuin typically do not marry people with connections to the same personal or family beings.

A moojingarl is believed to "appear" unexpectedly, with its behaviour variously indicating approval, that all is well or that danger approaches. A person's "spirit" is expected to return to their moojingarl, so the appearance of a dolphin may remind viewers of a relative whose moojingarl was the dolphin. A moojingarl is believed to reveal itself to a Yuin person, rather than be chosen for them.

King Merriman described to Howitt that his black duck budjan ("bird", translated by Howitt as "totem") resided in his breast, and that if it were killed, Merriman would die as well. Merriman describes an attack by a person of the lace-lizard "totem", who sent a lace-lizard to crawl down Merriman's throat; it almost managed to eat the budjan in his breast.

Yuin elder Max Dulumunmun Harrison says that your "personal totem" is "whatever comes near you when you are born".

== Spiritual beliefs ==
=== Messenger birds ===
Some Yuin believe in "messenger birds" or "mail birds", who are believed to communicate with their calls. Mopokes calling from a particular direction indicate that people are approaching from a particular direction (if they sing "fast and happy") or that a death occurred in the direction from which they are coming (if they call while slowly approaching from a distance). Willie wagtails deliver bad news, like the death of a loved one, and swans flying north indicate approaching storms. Yuin woman Eileen Morgan identifies four messenger birds (curlews, mail-birds, black ducks and owls), but also two mammals (black dogs and black wallabies).

When angered, "wind birds" (perhaps whip birds) are believed to make the west wind blow by whistling.

=== Dulagal ===
Some Yuin believe in dulagal (also rendered doolagarl) or "hairy man", a powerful being that lives on Mount Gulaga or in the bush between Bermagui and Mumbulla, but travels down to the coast. Guboo Ted Thomas describes him as having red eyes, no neck and a long forehead, and walking "from side to side". Yuin children were warned not to stray from the campsite for fear of dulagal, and he was said to be able to draw people to him or put them to sleep, and to imitate bird sounds. People could escape dulagal by burning green bush leaves. Yuin woman Eileen Morgan (and a sister of Thomas) associates dulagal with the yowie, although that particular term was not used by the Yuin.

== Notable Yuin ==
- Umbarra (died 1904), leader of the Djiringanj people
- Guboo Ted Thomas (1909–2002), Aboriginal Australian leader
- Max Dulumunmun Harrison (1936-2021), Yuin elder and educator
- Jimmy Little (1937–2012), Australian Aboriginal musician, actor and teacher
- Nathan Foley (born 1979), Native Australian singer-songwriter and television personality
- Alex Brown (academic), Aboriginal clinician and researcher
- Bobby McLeod, Aboriginal activist

== Sources ==
- "The Aboriginal Peoples – The Yuin Tribes". Taken from the book " Bermagui – A Century of Features and Families " by Ron Gaha and Judy Hearn. Internet Archive cached version from 10 March 2005 of The Mumballa Foundation web site. 2004. Archived from the original on 10 March 2005.
- "The Aboriginal whalers of Eden". ABC South East NSW. 29 October 2013.
- "Application Details". National Native Title Tribunal. Archived from the original on 19 December 2018.
- Cook, Kevin (2013). Making Change Happen: Black & White Activists Talk to Kevin Cook about Aboriginal, Union and Liberation Politics. ANU Press. p. 9.
- Coote, Gavin (20 February 2018). "Cultural fishing rights in Yuin native title claim gathers momentum". ABC News.
- Debus, Bob (2006). "Formal handback of Biamanga and Gulaga national parks to Aboriginal community: Media release – Friday, 3 February 2006". New South Wales Department of Environment and Climate Change.
- Donaldson, Susan Dale (2012). "Exploring ways of knowing, protecting, acknowledging Aboriginal totems across the Eurobodalla, Far South Coast, NSW: Final report" (PDF). Eurobodalla Shire Council. Archived from the original (PDF) on 14 June 2018.
- Foster, Warren (2006). "Gulaga told by Warren Foster". Stories of the Dreaming. Australian Museum.
- Guboo, Ted Thomas (1997). Renewing the dreaming: Guboo Ted Thomas. New South Wales: N/A.
- "Gulaga National Park". New South Wales Department of Environment and Climate Change. 2006.
- Harrison, Max Dulumunmun; McConchie, Peter (2009). My people's dreaming: an Aboriginal elder speaks on life, land, spirit and forgiveness. Warriewood: Finch Publishing. ISBN 978-1876451967 – via Trove.
- Howitt, Alfred William (1904). The native tribes of south-east Australia (PDF). Macmillan.
- "Indigenous rights organiser Kevin Cook 'opened the pathways' for all Australians". The Canberra Times. 19 August 2015.
- Luff, Erika (2005). "Aboriginal Overview". Cultural map. Bega Valley Shire Council.
- Mazel, Odette (2005). "Yuin Nation – Agreements". Agreements, Treaties and Negotiated Settlements (ATNS) project. Archived from the original on 11 February 2006.
- Morgan, Eileen (1994). The calling of the spirits. Canberra: Aboriginal Studies Press. ISBN 978-0855752552.
- "Mumballa Foundation". Internet Archive cached version from 10 March 2005 of The Mumballa Foundation web site. 2004. Archived from the original on 10 March 2005.
- Mumbler, Percy; Thomas, Guboo Ted. "Umbarra – Australian Institute of Aboriginal and Torres Strait Islander Studies (AIATSIS)". AIATSIS.
- Pacey, Laurelle (11 May 2006). "Handing back heartbeat of Yuin nation". Narooma News.
- Preschool, Children of Little Yuin Aboriginal, ed. (2015). Our Little Yuin. Wallaga Lake, NSW: Little Yuin Aboriginal Preschool. ISBN 978-0646932682.
- Rose, Deborah; James, Diana; Watson, Christine (May 2003). Indigenous kinship with the natural world in New South Wales (PDF). NSW National Parks and Wildlife Service. ISBN 0-7313-6704-9.
- "South Coast New South Wales". AIATSIS. 11 May 2017.
- Thomas, Guboo Ted; Stacey, Wesley (1980). Mumbulla spiritual contact. Canberra: Research School of Pacific Studies, Australian National University. ISBN 978-0909596712 – via Trove.
- Tindale, Norman Barnett (1974). Aboriginal Tribes of Australia: Their Terrain, Environmental Controls, Distribution, Limits, and Proper Names (PDF). Australian National University. ISBN 978-0-708-10741-6.
- Toner, P.G. (2015). Strings of Connectedness (PDF). Australian National University. doi:10.22459/SC.09.2015. ISBN 978-1-925022-63-6.
