= Wallaga Lake =

Lake in New South Wales, Australia

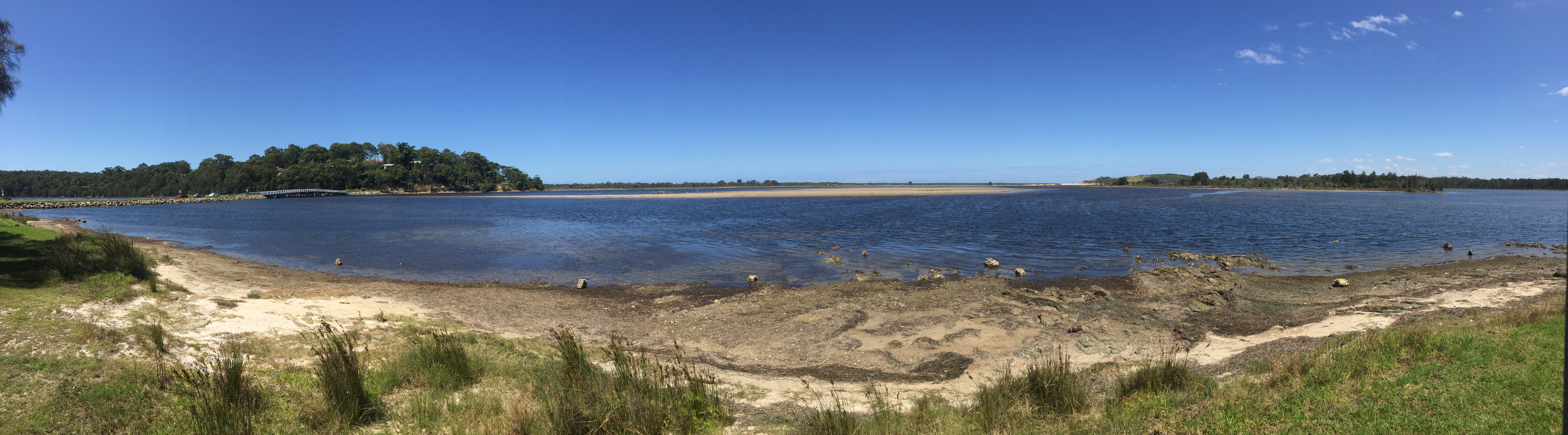

- Location in Australia
- Location: Bega Valley Shire, New South Wales, Australia
- Coordinates: 36.36869°S 150.05762°E
- Type: Estuarine lake
- Primary inflows: Dignams Creek, Narira Creek, and tributaries
- Primary outflows: Intermittently Closed and Open Lake or Lagoon (ICOLL)
- Catchment area: 280 km2 (110 sq mi)
- Basin countries: Australia
- Surface area: 7.8 km^{2} (3.0 sq mi)
- Islands: Merriman's Island

Wallaga Lake is an estuarine lake in Bega Valley Shire in New South Wales, Australia, the largest lake in southern NSW. It is located between Bermagui to the south and between Tilba Tilba to the north, situated beneath Mount Gulaga, in the traditional lands of the Yuin people. A large section of its foreshore and catchment are within the Gulaga National Park, since Wallaga Lake National Park, Goura Nature Reserve, and Mt Dromedary Flora Reserve were combined into the larger national park. There is an island in the lake known as Merriman's Island, Merriman Island or Umbarra.

The lake's surface area is 7.8 km^{2} (3.0 sq mi), while its catchment area spans 280 km^{2} (110 sq mi), consisting mainly of Dignams Creek and Narira Creek and tributaries. While the lake itself and most of its catchment fall within the Bega Valley Shire, the northern part of the catchment lies within Eurobodalla Shire Council. It is classified as an Intermittently Closed and Open Lake or Lagoon (ICOLL), because the entrance of the lake sometimes allows tidal exchange from the ocean, but at other times is closed off by a sand bar at the beach. It is a popular spot for recreational fishing, sailing, bushwalking and birdwatching.

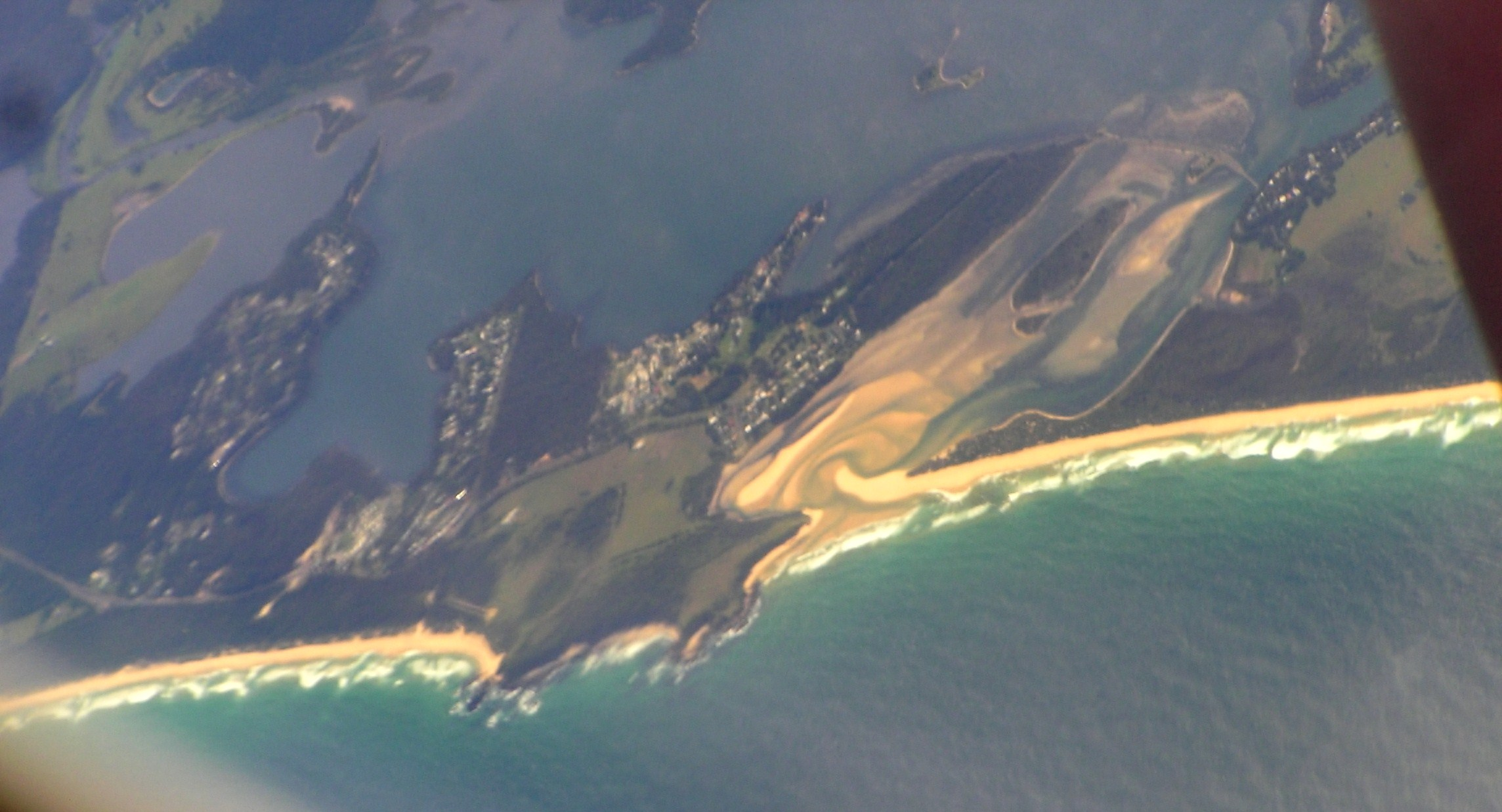
2011 aerial view of Wallaga Lake, looking south west

== Aboriginal history and present significance ==
The Wallaga Lake Aboriginal Station or Wallaga Lake Station, was an Aboriginal reserve near the lake, was established in 1891 by the Aborigines Protection Board of New South Wales (APB). It was categorised as an "Aboriginal station" or "managed reserve", which was a type of reserve established by the APB from 1883 onwards that was managed by APB-appointed officials. Education (in the form of preparation for the workforce), rations and housing were usually provided on these reserves, and station managers tightly controlled who could, and could not, live there. The land on reserves called stations was often unproductive, or there was not enough labour, and therefore little chance for the reserve to become self-sustaining. The Superintendent of the Reserve was also the teacher at the Wallaga Lake Aboriginal School that was established in March 1887.

The Aboriginal population of the Tathra area was removed to an Aboriginal reserve near the lake after colonisation of the area in the early to mid 19th century, under the control of the Aborigines Protection Board of New South Wales (APB). A 1925 account of people on the reserve tells of much fishing activity by both men and women, wood carvings which are sold to passers-by, the skilled use of the gum leaf as a musical instrument, being employed to work in the maize fields, the bora ceremony and other lore.

The lake is of significance to the Yuin people, being home to the black duck, a totem connected with the elder, Umbarra (aka "King Merriman", who died in 1904), who lived on Merriman's Island (aka Merriman Island and Umbarra) in the lake. In June 1978 Guboo Ted Thomas, a leader in the campaign for Indigenous land rights in Australia, wrote to then NSW Premier Neville Wran: "We, the Aboriginal people of Wallaga Lake and members of the Yuin tribe, do hereby place before you and the Government of New South Wales our claim for our Land Rights". In 2006, after a protracted battle for recognition of native title, the lake was included in a handover of the Gulaga and Biamanga National Parks to the Yuin people, to be jointly managed by the traditional owners and the NSW National Parks and Wildlife Service. The agreement was signed by then New South Wales Environment Minister Bob Debus and representatives for the Yuin people. The island is gazetted as an Aboriginal place and is not accessible to the public. Middens and other Aboriginal artefacts have been found around the lake.

Under Commonwealth native title law, Aboriginal people are allowed to fish on the lake without a State Government permit, but in around 2015 the NSW Aboriginal Fishing Rights Group decided to negotiate a cultural fishing permit under the Fisheries Management Act 1994 (NSW) in the spirit of collaboration with the Government of New South Wales, and they have been working closely ever since. In April 2020, men from the Bermagui Wallaga Lake Djiringanj men's group launched their new hand-built net fishing boat at the lake, thus reviving an old cultural tradition, thanks to a grant from the government. Young men from the community target species like flathead, bream, and mullet, and hand over their catch to local elders. They see it as a way of helping people who live below the poverty line, and suffer from poor nutrition, particularly lack of iodine, and diseases such as heart disease and diabetes brought on partly by poor nutrition.
