= Walbunja =

Aboriginal Australian people of New South Wales

The Walbunja, also spelt Walbanga, Walbunga and Wulbunja, are an Aboriginal Australian people of New South Wales, part of the Yuin nation.

== Language ==
The Walbunja language may be a dialect of Dhurga.

== Country ==
The Walbunja people are a subgroup of the Yuin nation.

Walbunja Country covers 2,500 square miles (6,500 km^{2}) a region from Cape Dromedary northwards to the vicinity of Ulladulla. Their inland extension is as far as the Shoalhaven River. Braidwood, Araluen and Moruya all lie on what is Walbunja land. The Wandandian peoples lay on their northern boundary, and to their south are the Djiringanj and Thaua.

== Alternative names ==
Alternative spellings include Walbanga, Walbunga, and Wulbunja.

According to Norman Tindale, alternative names included:

- Thurga (tirga, is the Walbunja word for "no")
- Thoorga
- Bugellimanji (A Walbunja horde)
- Bargalia
- Moruya tribe

== Walbunja Rangers ==
The Walbunja Rangers Programme was established by the Batemans Bay Local Aboriginal Land Council in response to the Black Summer fires in 2019–20 . The group comprises 10–15 young Indigenous rangers who undertake cultural burning, pest eradication, and monitoring species monitoring on Country. In March 2024 the group won the Marie Byles Award for the most inspiring community action initiative in the NSW Environment Awards, a group of awards given by the Nature Conservation Council of New South Wales.

== Notable people ==
- In 2023, Aunty Maryanne Nye, a member of the Walbunja community, was given the Paul Harris Fellow Award (a Rotary Club award) for her work at the Boomerang Meeting Place in Mogo, New South Wales.
