= Gulaga National Park =

National park in New South Wales, Australia

- IUCN category II (national park)
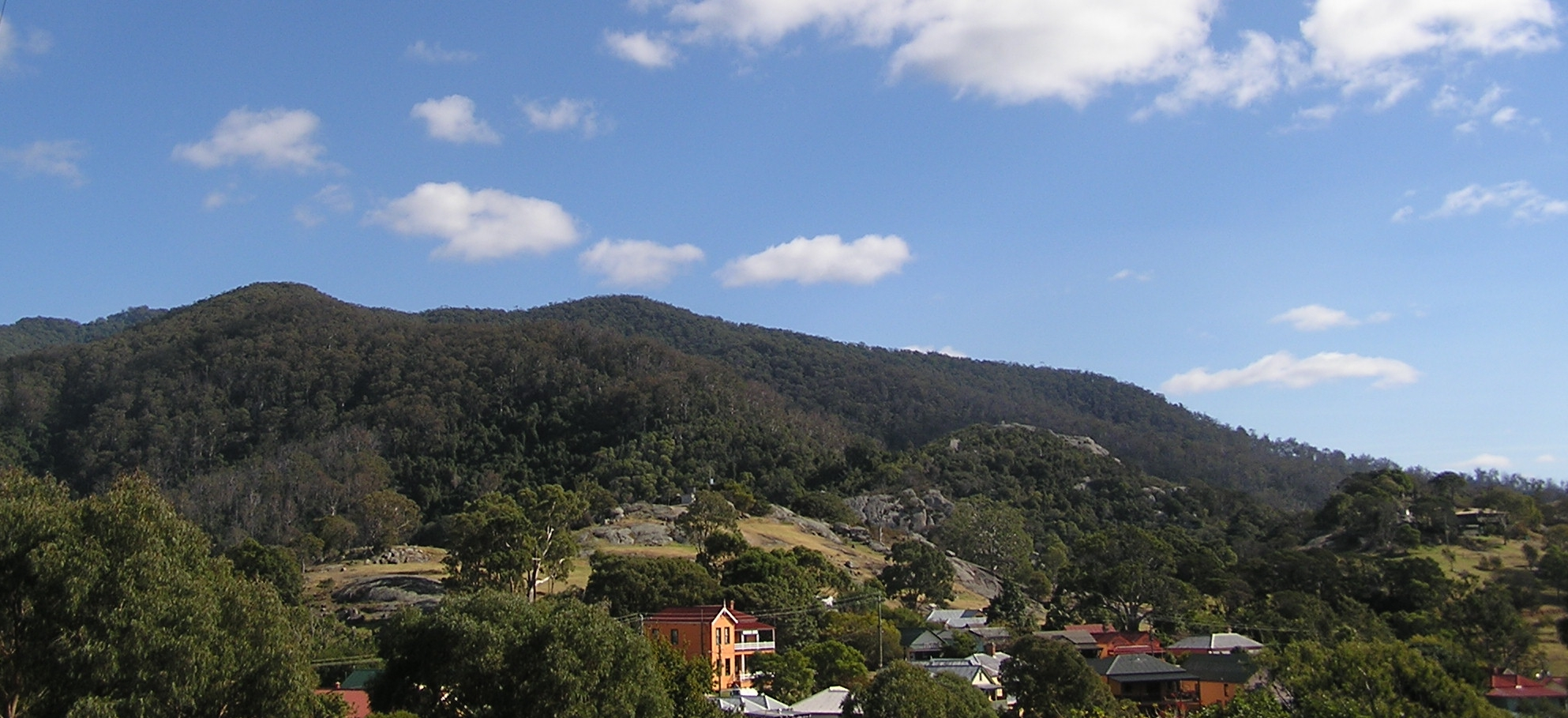
- Mount Gulaga and Central Tilba

- Location within New South Wales
- Location: New South Wales
- Coordinates: 36°18′24″S 150°01′09″E
- Area: 46.73 km^{2} (18.04 sq mi)
- Established: 2001
- Governing body: NSW National Parks and Wildlife Service
- Website: Official website

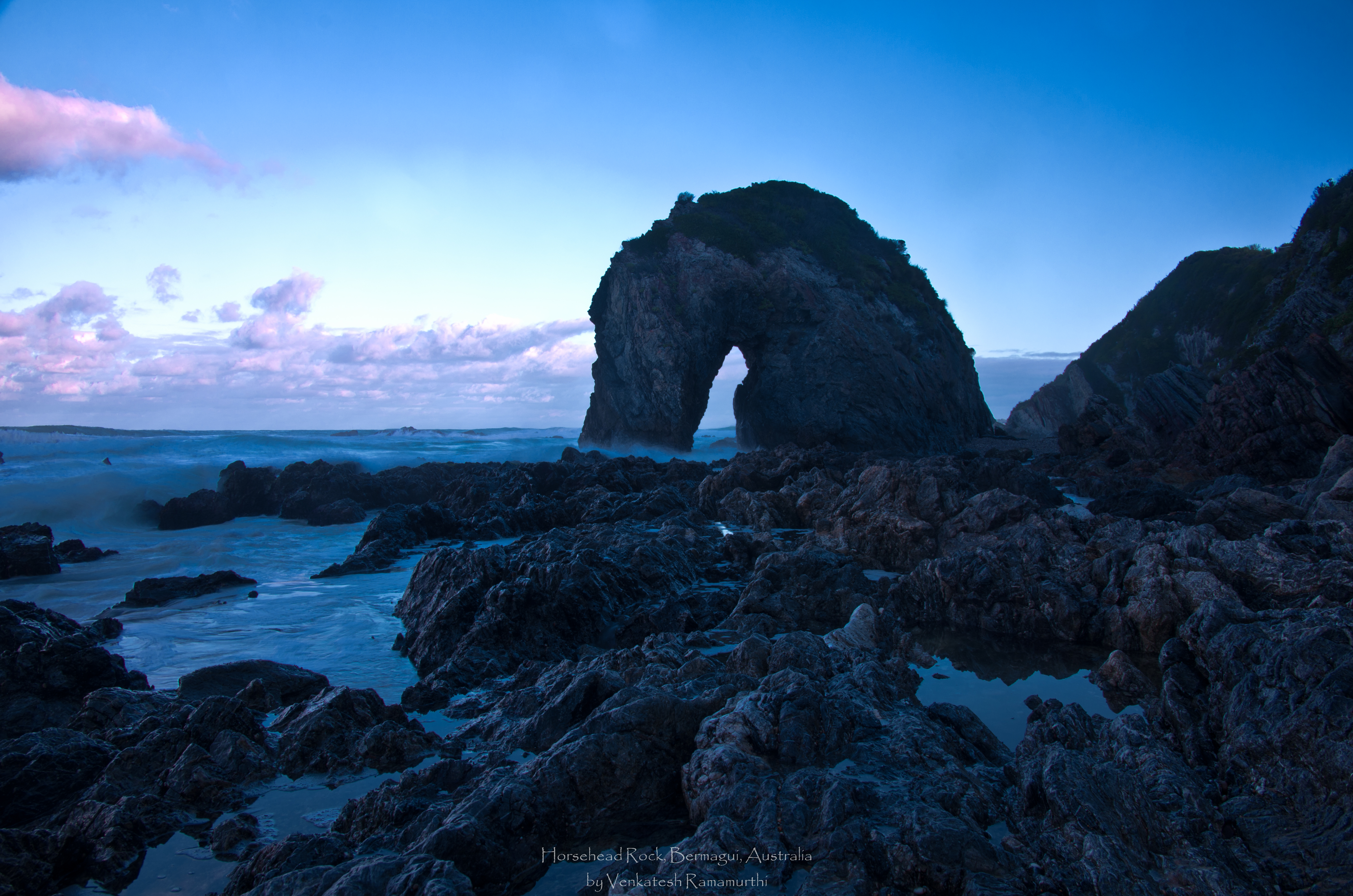
Horse Head Rock, on the coast near Lake Wallaga

Gulaga National Park is a national park on the south coast of New South Wales, Australia, about 15 kilometres (9.3 mi) south of Narooma. The park is dominated by Gulaga, also known as Mount Gulaga (formerly Mount Dromedary). The former Wallaga Lake National Park, Goura Nature Reserve, and Mount Dromedary Flora Reserve were combined to form this park in 2001. The park features the southernmost subtropical rainforest in New South Wales.

== History ==
Gulaga was an active volcano more than 60 million years ago.

In 2001, as part of the Southern Comprehensive Regional Forest Agreement and at the request of Yuin people, Gulaga National Park was created out of the existing Wallaga Lake National Park, Goura Nature Reserve, and Mt Dromedary Flora Reserve.

On 6 May 2006 the freehold titles to Gulaga and Biamanga National Parks were handed back to the Yuin people, the traditional owners of the land, by the New South Wales Government, represented by then New South Wales Environment Minister Bob Debus. Freehold title of Gulaga National Park is held in trust by land councils for the Aboriginal owners by Merrimans and Wagonga Local Aboriginal Lands Councils, while that of Biamanga will be held in trust by Merrimans and Bega Local Aboriginal Lands Councils.

== Geography ==
The mountain is currently 1,000 metres (3,300 ft) high, surrounded by lakes, mining tracks, rainforest and the countryside. The park is 46.73 square kilometres (18.04 sq mi) in area. It forms part of the Ulladulla to Merimbula Important Bird Area, identified as such by BirdLife International because of its importance for swift parrots.

Wallaga Lake, the largest lake in southern NSW, lies within the park.

Bermagui is about 10 kilometres (6.2 mi) south of the park.

== See also ==
- Protected areas of New South Wales
