= Bermagui, New South Wales =

Bermagui
- Town
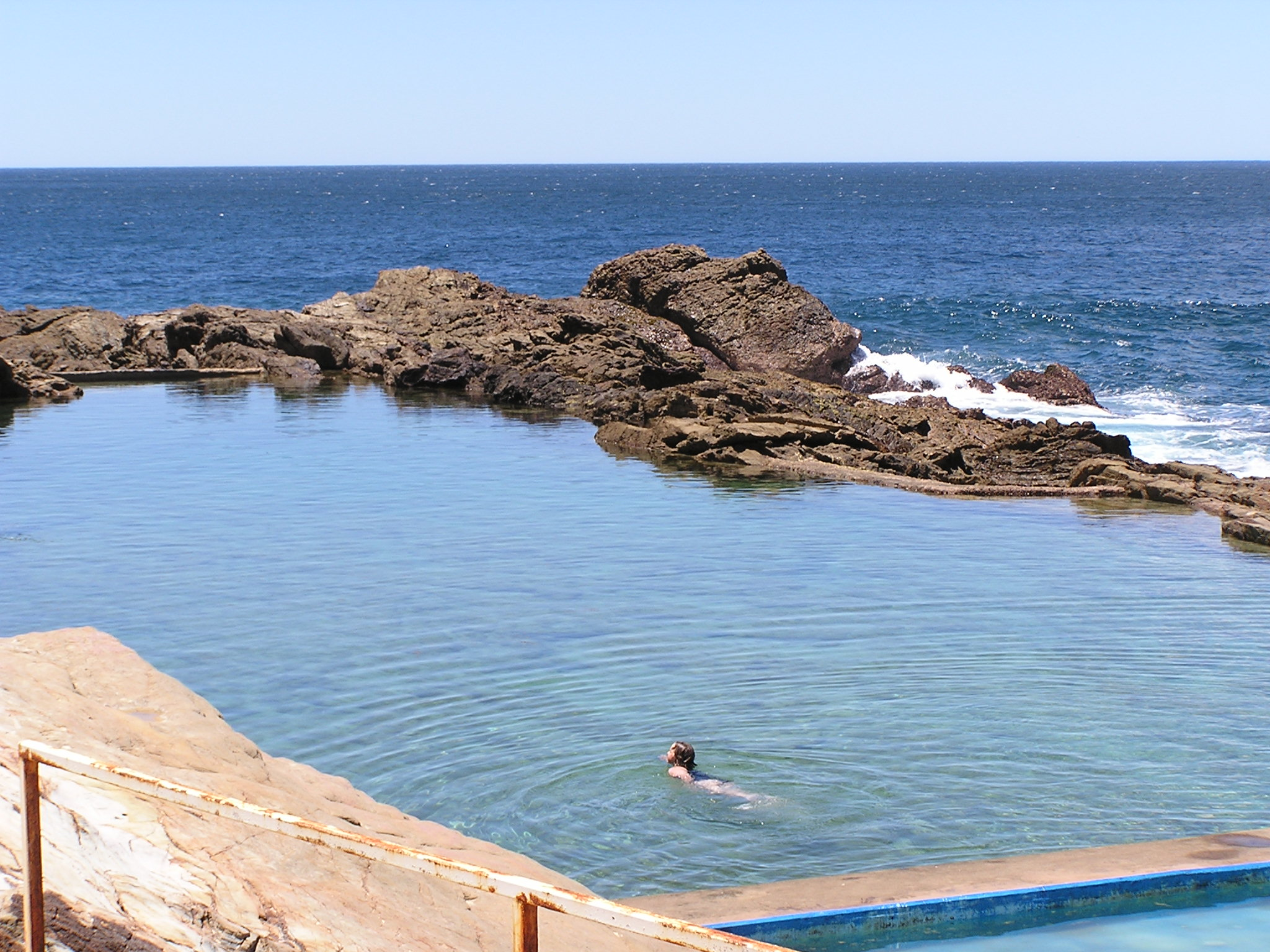
- The Blue Pool at Bermagui

- Coordinates: 36°25′S 150°04′E
- Country: Australia
- State: New South Wales
- LGA: Bega Valley Shire
- Location: 34 km (21 mi) from Narooma

Government
  - State electorate: Bega
  - Federal division: Eden-Monaro

Population
  - Total: 1,536 (2016 census)
- Postcode: 2546
- County: Dampier

Bermagui (/bɜːrməɡjui/) is a town on the south coast of New South Wales, Australia, in the Bega Valley Shire. It lies on the shores of the southern end of Horseshoe Bay. The name is derived from the Dyirringanj word, permageua, possibly meaning "canoe with paddles".

== History ==
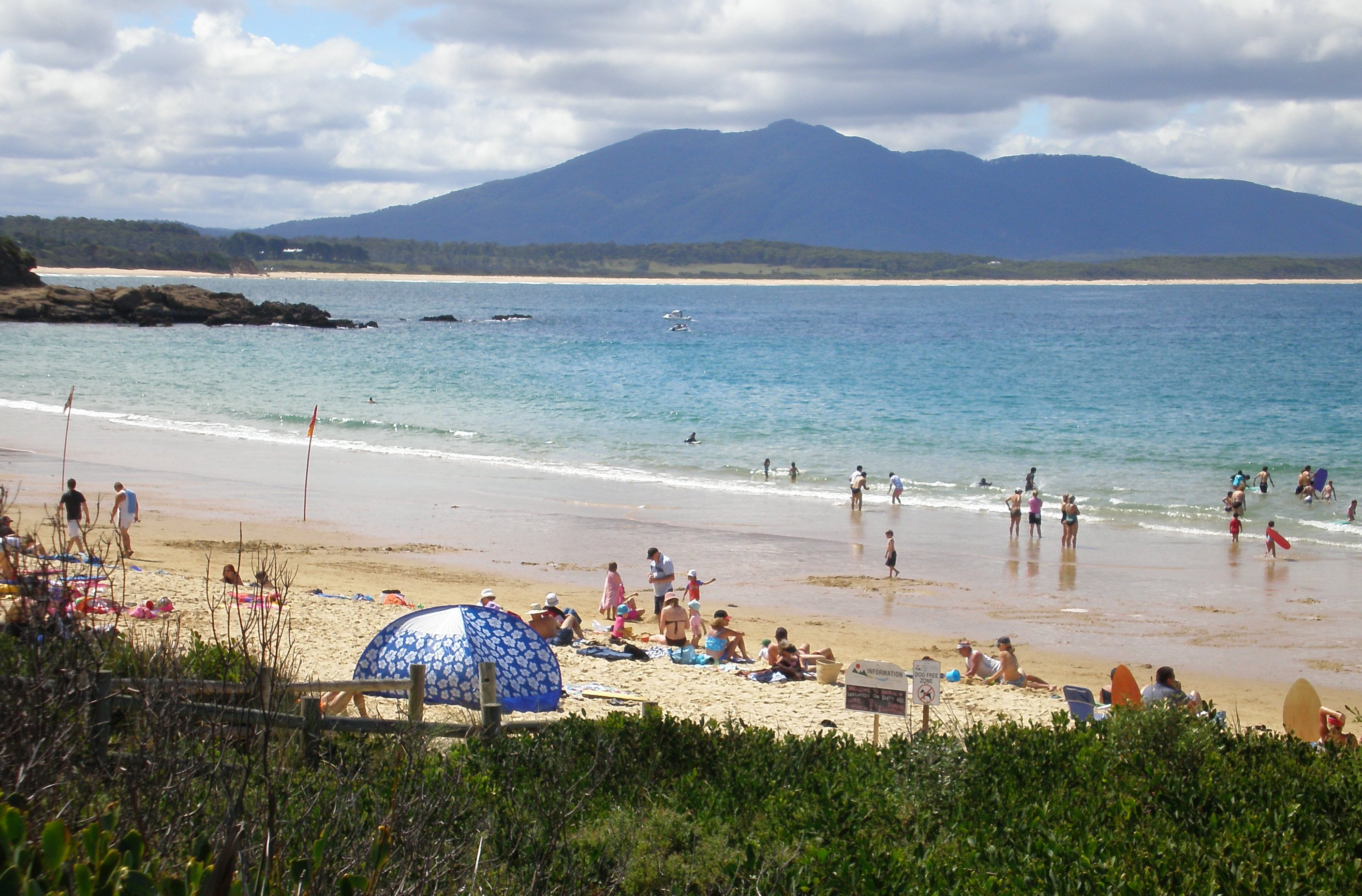
Bermagui Beach and Mount Dromedary

A wharf was built in Horseshoe Bay in 1888 for the coastal trade. The port was serviced by the Illawarra Steam Navigation Company.

A 1910 article, "Bermagui – In a Strange Sunset", published by Henry Lawson in The Bulletin describes a steamer journey from Bermagui to Sydney. Lawson was probably travelling with the Illawarra Steam Navigation Company.

In 1880, the Government geologist Lamont Young and four others disappeared while on a boat trip from Bermagui. Their boat was found near Mystery Bay, which is about 15 kilometres north of Bermagui, midway between Bermagui and Narooma, near Tilba. The bay received its name because of the disappearance.

Zane Grey, the well-known big-game fisherman of the 1930s and author of Westerns, was patron of the Bermagui Sport Fishing Association for 1936/37 and anchored his yacht, the "Avalon" in Horseshoe Bay. He returned briefly for a visit in 1939. He wrote of his experiences in the town.

In 1943, the Japanese submarine I-21 sank the iron ore carrier SS Iron Knight off the coast of Bermagui. Local fisherman had tangled their nets on the wreck deep below the surface in 125 metres of water, but did not know the ship lay there until a team of divers confirmed its existence on 4 June 2006. On 29 July 2006 relatives and descendants of the ship's crew came to Bermagui for a memorial and commemorative service.

A fishing harbour was built at Bermagui in 1959, the first in a new series by the Public Works Department.

== Population ==
In 2016, there were 1,536 people in Bermagui. 77.9% of people were born in Australia and 89.0% of people only spoke English at home. The most common responses for religion were No Religion 35.2%, Anglican 22.5% and Catholic 15.5%.

== Geography ==
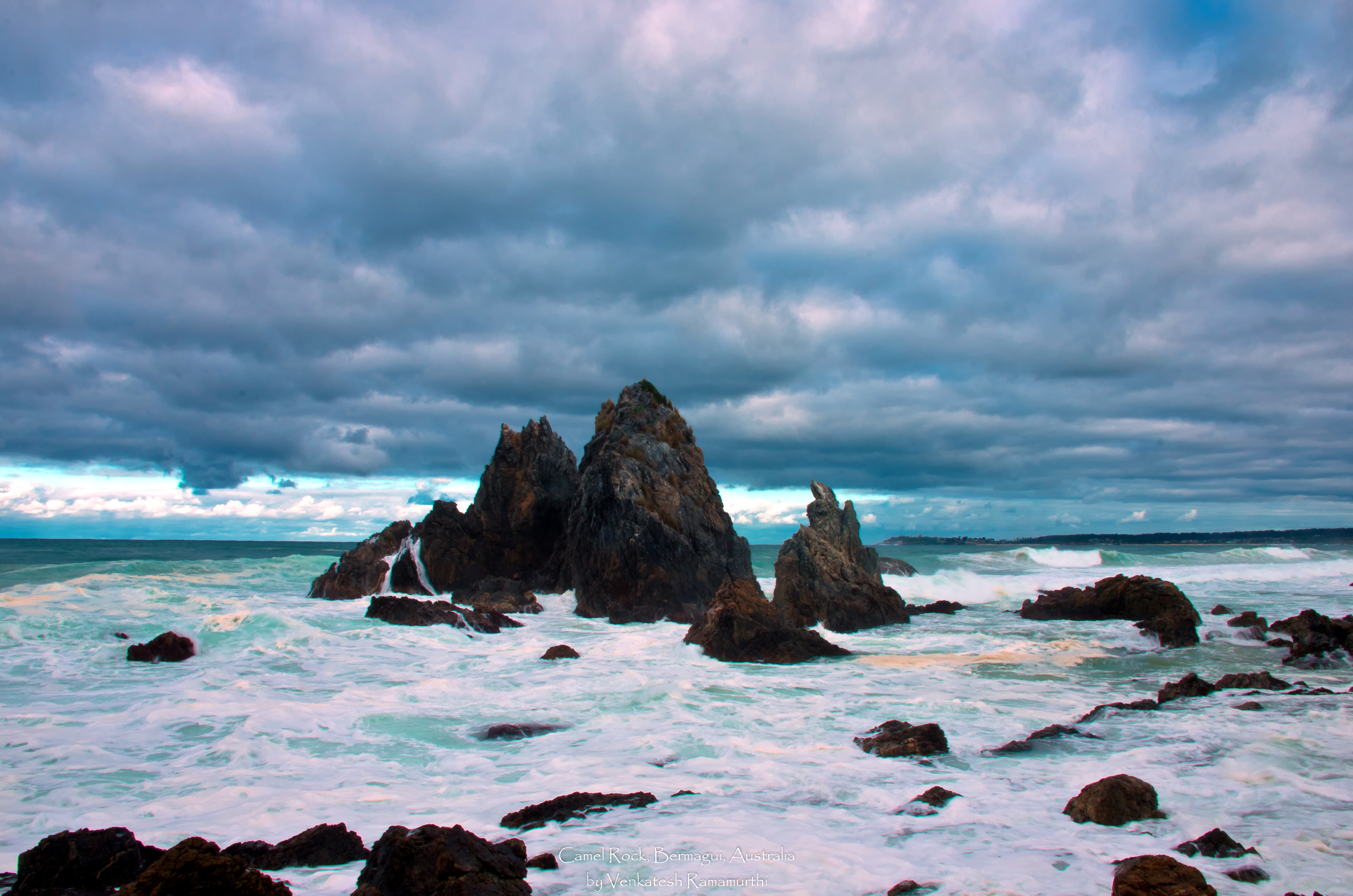
Camel Rock, in the Gulaga National Park north of Bermagui

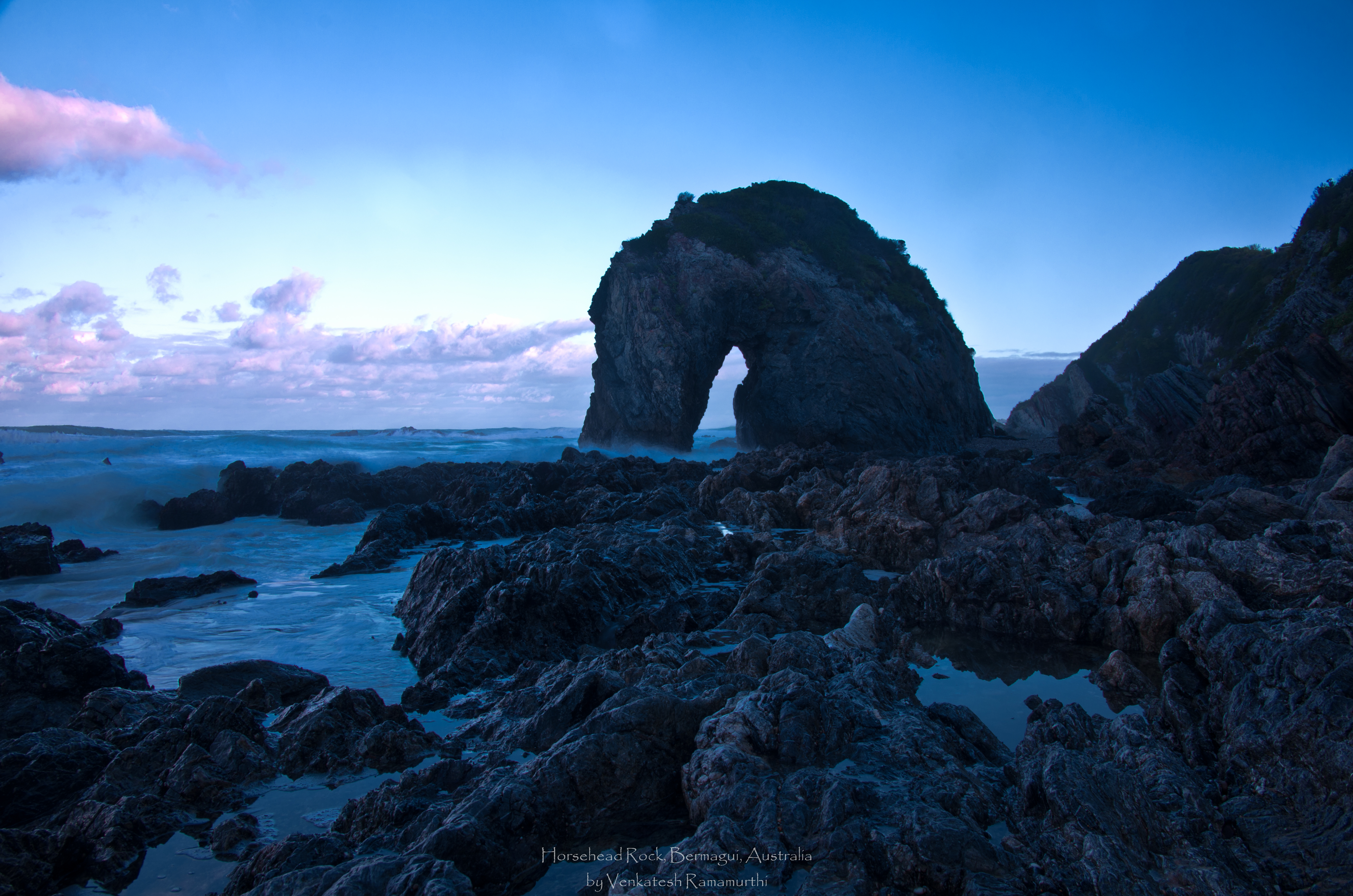
Horse Head Rock, within the Gulaga National Park.

It is said that 19 kilometres (12 mi) offshore from Bermagui the edge of the "continental shelf is at its closest point to the mainland and hence there is good fishing. As of 2013 anglers were allowed to catch, or tag and release marlin, and tuna such as yellowfin, bluefin, and albacore, which are sought after "game fish".

Gulaga National Park is about 10 kilometres (6.2 mi) north of Bermagui.

== Transport ==
There is a fishing harbour.

Bermagui is served by sealed road connections to Tathra (44 km south), Cobargo (20 km west) and the Princes Highway (15 km to the north) near Tilba.

== Facilities ==
Bermagui Public School is a primary school, which has taught local Aboriginal languages, the Dhurga and Djiringanj languages, and associated cultures since 2019.

Bermagui has a local post, Bermagui Local Post, operating within the town.

== In the arts ==
Zane Grey filmed part of his shark film White Death (1936) and wrote the storyline for Rangle River (1936) while camped at Bermagui. His book of his game fishing adventures here An American Angler in Australia was published in 1937. He also worked on his epic Australian Western novel Wildness Trek while in Bermagui, which was not published until after his death in 1944.

During the 1950s, detective writer Arthur Upfield lived in the town and made it the setting for one of his novels, The Mystery of Swordfish Reef.

Dorothy Hewett (author and well known feminist and communist) wrote her gothic love story Neap Tide (1999) set in the fictional town of "Zane" while camped at Umbi Gumbi, Cuttagee to the south of Bermagui.

Outdoor scenes from the film The Man Who Sued God (2001) starring Billy Connolly were shot in Bermagui. There are scenes of the Bermagui Boat Harbour, the main street, and surrounding beaches. Many locals are in the movie, and the classic boat is a local charter fishing boat. Bermagui locals thoroughly enjoyed Billy Connolly's visit .

In January 2005, the Leader of the Opposition, Mark Latham, and his family retreated here from the media, before his decision to resign as ALP leader and from Parliament, writing in The Latham Diaries that "God has given us Bermagui, let's enjoy it".

In 2010, Bermagui was mentioned in the fictional television series Rake as the location of Nicole Vargas' (Kate Box) holiday home. The home was built with embezzled funds from her employer, Cleaver Greene (Richard Roxburgh).

The historic wooden Wallaga Lake Bridge north of Bermagui was the setting for a scene in the 2014 film Unbroken.

Children's book illustrator and author Matt Chun ran a cafe and gallery space on Bunga Street, Bermagui, called Mister Jones. In 2016 it made national headlines after its sign describing Australia Day as "National Dickhead Day" went viral on social media, sparking threats of vandalism.

== See also ==
- King Merriman
- Yuin
- List of ports in Australia
