= List of Aboriginal languages of New South Wales =

Prior to colonisation in 1788, the Aboriginal Australians living in the areas now known as New South Wales spoke between 35 - 40 languages including between 70 - 100 dialects. Some of these languages are closely related, many are no longer spoken fluently and some are considered endangered or extinct by linguists but are described as "sleeping" by First Nations people. Aboriginal languages were not written down prior to contact with colonists, but for thousands of years the oral tradition passed down knowledge of country, astronomy, the environment, navigation, stories of creation and the seasons, the relationship and obligations First Nations people have to country and one another. Where word lists and written records were made after colonisation, they were often compiled by amateurs with no linguistic training, there are many variations of spelling and knowledge of the grammar of some languages may be limited without fluent speakers.

The New South Wales Aboriginal Languages Act 2017 became law on 24 October 2017. It is the first legislation in Australia to acknowledge the significance of First Languages.

The Aboriginal Language and Culture Nest project in NSW draws together communities with a common language to create opportunities to "revitalise, reclaim and maintain traditional languages". There are Aboriginal Language and Culture Nests that focus on the Bundjalung, Gamilaraay, Gumbaynggirr, Wiradjuri and Paakantji/Baarkintji languages. During the International Year of Indigenous Languages the issues of language loss and language revitalization projects were featured from the perspectives of First Nations people around NSW in a Living Language exhibition.

The Australian Institute of Aboriginal and Torres Strait Islander Studies (AIATSIS) maintain the AUSTLANG database of information from a number of sources about Aboriginal and Torres Strait Islander languages. The dataset listing the languages and synonyms is published under a Creative Commons Attribution 4.0 licence for reuse.

== A-B ==
Language	AIATSIS AUSTLANG code	Also known as (AUSTLANG synonyms)	References
Arakwal	E13	Aragwal, Arakawal, Coo al, Gundurima, Jahwun Jere, Jawjumjeri, Kagung, Kahwul, Kogung, Lismore tribe, Naiang, Njung, Nyung, Tugurimba, Yawkum yore, Gundurimba, Jawhumjeri, Yawkum yere	
Awabakal	S66	Awabagal, Awaba, Kuri, Kuringgai, Lake Macquarie, Awarbukal, Arwarburkarl, Newcastle tribe	
Baanbay	E8	Kumbainggar, Gumbainggir, Baanbay/Banbai, Banbai, Gamlamang, Jiegera, Kumbainggiri, Yaygir, Yuungay, Ahnbi, Babnbi, Baanbay Ahnbi, Dandai, Bahnbi	
Bandjigali	D17	Bandjangali, Pantyikali, Paakantyi, Wanjiwalku, Bandjagali, Barkindji, Milya uppa, Barkinji, Barkinjee, Barkunjee, Bahkunji, Pakindji, Pa:kindzi, Bakandji, Bahkunjy, Barkinghi, Parkungi, Par kengee, Parkingee, Bakanji, Bakandi, Bargunji, Bagundji, Bagandji, Bpaagkon jee, Kurnu, Kkengee, Kornoo, Kaiela, Wimbaja,	
Baraba Baraba	D5	Barababaraba, Baraba baraba, Baraparapa, Barappur, Bareber Bareber, Barraba barraba, Barrababarraba, Birraba birraba, Boora boora, Boorabirraba, Booraboora, Boort, Burabura, Burappa, Burapper, Burrabura ba, Burraburburaba, Burreba burreba, Karraba, Beraba Beraba, Berrapper dialect, Barrappur, Baraber, Boraipar, Boora Boora, Lower Loddon tribe, Boort tribe	
Barranbinya	D26	Barranbinja, Baranbinja, Barren binya, Barrumbinya, Barrunbarga, Burrabinya, Burranbinga, Burranbinya, Burrumbinya, Burrunbinya, Parran binye, Barabinja, Baranbinya, Burrun binya, Burrunbinia, Burrunbinya	
Bidawal	S49	Bidhawal, Bidwell, Biduwul, Beddiwell, Bida:wal, Biduelli, Bidwelli, Bidwill, Birdawal, Birdhawal, Birtowall, Kwai dhang, Maap, Muk dhang, Birrdhawal, Bid, doo, wul, Bidooal, Bida, Brida, Bidwilli, Bida:wa:l, Mawp, Muk thang, Mukdhang, Mukthang	
Bigambul	D34	Bigambal, Pikambul, Bee gum bul, Beegumbul, Begumble, Bigabul, Bigambel, Bigumble, Bigunbil, Peekumble, Pickimbul, Pickum bul, Pickumbil, Pickumble, Picum bul, Picumbill, Pikambal, Pikum bul, Pikumbal, Pikumbil, Pikumbul, Pikumpal, Preagalgh, Pregalgh, Wee n gul la mbul, Wigal wollumbul, Bigumbil, Wee n gul la m bul	
Birpai	E3	Birpay, Worimi, Birbay, Biripi, Biribi, Birippi, Birrapee, Birrbay, Birripai, Birripi, Bripi, Brippai, Waw wyper, Biribai, Birrbay, Gathang, Kattang	
Bolali	D11	Paakantyi, Bulaali, Bulalli, Maljangapa, Wiljakali, Pulaali, Pulakali, Maljangaba, Malya napa, Mulya napa, Mulya nappa, Milya uppa, Mullia arpa, Muliaarpa, Malynapa, Malja:pa, Malyapa, Nalyanapa, Malgangara, Karikari, Bulali for Maljangapa, Wilyakali, Wiljali, Wiljagali, Willoo, Bo arli, Bulali for Wiljakali	
Bundjalung	E12	Bandjalang, Arakwal, Badjulung, Banjalang, Birihn, Dinggabal, Geinyan, Gidabal, Jukambal, Jukambe, Kalibal, Keinjun, Kitabal, Minjunbal, Ngarahgwal, Nyangbal, Wahlubal, Widjubal, Wiyabal, Wudjehbal, Yugambeh, Badjalang, Badjelang, Bandjalong, Bandjelang, Bandyalang, Bandjalung, Bunjalung	

== C-G ==
Language	AIATSIS AUSTLANG code	Also known as (AUSTLANG synonyms)	References
Danggali	D14, D59	Paakantyi, Dhanggaali, Milpulo, Dhanggagarli, Dangali, Danggadi, Tungarlee, Tongaranka, Danggagali, Tung arlee, Dthang gaa lee, Dthanggka, Dthanggha, Paritke, Paridke, Momba, Nanja, Nanjara, Nonnia, Nganya, Scotia blacks, Nju:wiki, Yakumban, Yakkumbata, Yakayok, Jakojako, Jokajoka, Yokka Yokka, Yaak yakko, Milpulko, Mailpurlgu, Mamba	
Darkinung	S65	Darkinjung, Darkinjang, Darginyung, Darknung, Darkin nyoong, Darginjang	
Daruk	S64	Sydney, Dharug, Darug, Dharuk, Oharruk, Dharrok, Darrkinyung, Dharruk, Dharrook, Darrook, Broken Bay tribe	
Dhanggatti	E6	Dunghutti, Dhanggatti, Djan gadi, Thangatti, Dyangadi, Dainggatti, Dainggati, Dhan gadi, Ngaku, Thungutti, Dangadi, Danggetti, Dhangatty, Thangatty, Dangati, Tangetti, Burgadi, Boorkutti, Dhanggadi, Djangadi, Dunggudi, Thungatti, Djaingadi, Dang getti, Danghetti, Danggadi, Dhangatty, Yuungai, Yunggai, Tang gette, Burugardi, Nulla Nulla, Amberu, Himberrong, Jang, Yung, Dhunggutti, Dhunghutti	
Dharamba	S56	Dhurga, Tharumba, Wandandian, Kurial yuin, Murraygaro, Jervis Bay tribe	
Dharawal	S59	Tharawal, Thurawal, Wodiwodi, Dariwal, Gujangal, Guyangal, Dharawa, Thurrawal, Turuwul, Turrubul, Turuwull, Turawal, Dharawal, Darawal, Mathews, Darawa:l, Carawal, Thurrawall, Turu wal, Ta ga ry, Five Islands tribe	
Dhurga	S53	Yuin, Djiringanj, Dyirringan, Thaua, Thawa, Walbanga, Wandandian, Thurga, Thoorga, Tindale, Wurm, Dhu:rga, Oates, Durga, Bugellimanji, Bargalia, Moruya tribe, Thauaira, Du:rga, Tharawal, Tadera manji, Guyanagal, Guyangal yuin, Murring, Katungal, Baianga, Paiendra, Paienbera	
Djirringany	S51	Djirringanj, Yuin, Djiringanj/Dyirringan, Dhurga, Djiringanj, Dyirringan, Thaua, Thawa, Walbanga, Wandandian, Dyirringany, Jiringayn, Jeringin	
Eora	S61	Sydney, Iora, Gamaraygal, Gameraigal, Iyora, Biyal Biyal, Eo ra, Ea ora, Yo ra, Kameraigal, Kem:arai, Kemmaraigal, Camera gal, Cammera, Camerray gal, Cam meray, Kemmirai gal, Gweagal, Bedia mangora, Gouia gul, Gouia, Botany Bay tribe, Wanuwangul, Kadigal, Caddiegal, Cadigal, Gadigal	
Galibal	E15	Galival, Kalibal, Moorung moobar, Murwillumbah	
Gamilaraay	D23	Gamilaroi, Kamilaroi, Euahlayi, Guyinbaray, Juwalarai, Ualarai, Walarai, Weraerai, Wirajarai, Kamilarai, Kamilroi, Kamalarai, Koomilroi, Gunilroi, Guminilroi, Gumilray, Camleroy, Euhahlayi, Gamilray, Northern Gamilaraay, Peel River language, Kamilaori, Kamilari, Kamu, laroi, Kaameelarrai, Kamileroi, Komleroy, Gamilroi, Kahmilaharoy, Kamilary, Gumilroi, Gummilroi, Gummilray, Kimilari, Karmil, Kamil, Comleroy, Ghummilarai, Cammealroy, Kahmilari, Kakmilari, Cumilri, Cam ell eri, Cum milroy, Cummeroy, Gunnilaroi, Kahml Duhai, Yauan, Tjake, Tyake, Gomeroi	
Garanggaba	L15	Karenggapa, Garanggaba, Karengappa, Karrengappa, Kurengappa, Karengapa	
Gawambaray	D39, D57	Coo in bur ri, Gawambarai, Ginniebal, Goinberai, Guinberai, Guinbrai, Juwalarai, Kawambarai, Kawamparai, Koinbere, Koinberi, Koinberri, Kwambarai"Mole tribe", Mooran Mooran, Waholari, Walarai, Walari, Warlarai, Weraerai, Weraiari, Wiraiarai, Wirra:arai, Wirri Wirri, Wirriri, Wirriwirri, Wolaroi, Wolaroo, Wolleri, Wolroi, Woolaroi, Wooratherie, Gawambaray, Goin berai, Mole tribe, Wirairai, Wallaroi, Wolroi, Walro, Wolaroi, Wullaroi	
Geawegal	E1, D63	Garewagal, Geawagal, Geawe gal, Gweagal, Keawaikal, Keawekal, Kawawaykal, Geawegal, Gwegal, Gwiyagal, Guyagal	
Githabul	E14	Gidhabal, Gidabal, Bandjalang, Kidabal, Kidjabal, Kita bool, Kittabool, Kitabool, Kitapul, Gidabul, Gidjoobal, Kuttibul, Noowidal	
Gogai	D56	Wakawaka, Barungam, Barunggam, Cogai, Gogai, Kogai, Murrumgama, Murrumningama, Murrungama, Parrungoom, Murrum ningama	
Gujangal	S50	Guyangal	
Gumbaynggir	E7	Baanbay, Banbai, Bellingen tribe, Bellinger tribe, Cambanggarie, Coombagoree, Coombangree, Coombargaree, Coombyn gura, Coombyngara, Coombyngura, Coombyugura, Cumbainggar, Gumbaynggir, Guinbainggiri, Gumbainggirr, Gumbainga, Gumbainggar, Gumbanga, Gumbanggar, Gumbanggeri, Gumbanjaree, Gumbayngir, Gunbainygar, Gumbaigar, Gunbaigar, Gumbaingar, Gumbainggir, Gamlamang, Jiegera, Kumbainggiri, Kombaingheri, Kombinegherry, Koombabgghery, Koombainga, Koombanggary, Koombanggherry, Koombangi, Kumbaingeri, Kumbainggeri, Kumbainggir, Kumbainggirri, Kumbainggar, Kumbaingir, Koombangghery, Kumbanggerri, Koombanggaree, Kumbainggerri, Kumbinggeri, Kumbanggar, Kom baingheri, Kumbangerai, Kumbangar, Nimboy, Orara, Woolgoolga, Yaygir, Yuungay	
Gundungurra	S60	Burragorang, Gundungura, Gundaahmyro, Gundungorra, Cundunorah, Gundungari, Gundanora, Gurra gunga, Gungungurra	
Gunybaray	D15	Guyinbaraay, Gunjbaraay, Kamilaroi, Guyinbaray, Euahlayi, Gamilaroi, Juwalarai, Ualarai, Walarai, Weraerai, Wirajarai, Gunjbarai, Gunjbarri, Koinberi, Koinberri, Kawambarai, Cooinburri, Kawamparai, Koinbere, Gawambarai, Goin berai, Guinbrai, Guinberai, Mole tribe, Coo in bur ri, Wirriri, Wirriwirri, Wooratherie	
Gurungada	S57		

== H-M ==
Language	AIATSIS AUSTLANG code	Also known as (AUSTLANG synonyms)	References
Jaitmathang	S43	Balangamida, Brajerak, Djilamatang, Duduroa, Kandangora, Omeo tribe, Theddora, Yaitmathang, Dhudhuroa, Dyinning middhang, Ginning matong, Gundanara, Gundanora, Jadjmadang, Jaithmathang, Jaitmatang, Jaitmathang, Jandangara, Jeenong metong, Kandangoramittung, Muddhang, Mudthang, Tharamirttong, Tharamittong, Tharomattay, Theddora mittung, Theddoramittung, Ya itma thang, Yaitmatheng, Yadjmadhang, Yai-itma-thang	
Ku-ring-gai	E95	Guringay, Gringai, Gathang	
Kureinji	D6.1	Gure:ndji, Gurendji, Gureinji, Grangema, Garnghes, Jungeegatchere, Karin, Keramin, Kerinma, Karinma, Karingma, Kemendok, Kureinyi, Kareingi, Ka rinma, Kinenekinene, Kianigane, Orangema, Pintwa,	
Kurnu	D25	Darling, Cornu, Ee na won, Gu:nu, Gu:rnu, Guerno, Guno, Gurnu, Guula, Gunu, Kula, Koono, Koonoo, Kornoo, Kornu, Kuno, Noolulgo, Paakantyi,	
Malyangapa	L8	Bulali, Bulalli, Karikari, Malgangara, Maljangapa, Malyangaba, Malgaaljangaba, Malja:pa, Maljanapa, Maljangaba, Malya napa, Malyanapa, Malyapa, Malynapa, Milya uppa, Milyauppa, Muliaarpa, Mullia arpa, Multyerra, Mulya napa, Mulya nappa, Mulyanapa, Mulyanappa, Ngurunta, Nalyanapa,	
Marawara	D6	Beriko, Bandjigali, Berlko, Berri ait, Paakantyi, Marawara, Maraura, Ilaila, Jakajako, Mara:wara, Mareaura, Mareawura, Marewera, Maroura, Marowera, Mare aura, Marowra, Marraa Warree, Waimbio, Wiimbaio, Wiimbo, Wimbaja, Waimbo, Wiimpaya, Yaakoyaako	
Minjungbal	E18	Minyangbal, Minjangbal, Yugambal, Minjanbal, Boggangar, Minyowa, Minyung, Wangerriburra, Minjungbal, Gendo, Gando Minjang, Gan dowal, Ngandowul, Cudgingberry, Cood jingburra	
Muruwari	D32	Muruwari, Muruwarri, Murawarri, Morowari, Marawari, MarraaWarree, Maruwari, Moorawarree, Moorawarrie, Morewari, Murawari, Murrawari, Murrawarri, Murri, Murueri, Muruworri, Muruwurri, Marraawarree, Murra warri, Yacko Yacko	
Mutti Mutti / Muthi Muthi	D8	Madhi Madhi; Madi Madi; Bakiin; Mataua; Matimati; Matthee matthee; Moorta Moorta; Mudhi Mudhi; Muthimuthi; Muti muti; Muttee Muttee; Madimadi; Mutte Mutte; Madi madi	

== N-R ==
Language	AIATSIS AUSTLANG code	Also known as (AUSTLANG synonyms)	References
Nari Nari	D9	Narinari	
Nawalgu	D19	Barundji, Bungyarlee, Paakantyi, Naualko, Parundji, Nawalko, Ngunnhalgu, Ngunnhlgri, Parooige, Unelgo, Nabarlgu, Ngunnhalgri, Milpulko, Mailpurlgu, Nawalgu, Nhaawu parlku, Wampandi, Wampangee, Wombungee, Wompungee	
Ngaku	E4	Dainggatti, Dainggati, Dhan gadi, Dunghutti, Ngaagu, Ngagu, Niungacko, Thungutti	
Ngambaa	E5	Ngaku, Ngeunbah, Niungacko, Ngamba, Ngambarr, Ngambar,	
Nganyaywana	D24	Nganjaywana, Aneewan, Aniwan, Inuwon, Nganyaywana, Anaiwan, Anewan, Amberu, Anaywan, Ee na won, En née win, Eneewin, Enniwon, Enuin, Inuwen, Inuwon, Nee inuwon, Newana, nganyaywana, Nowan, Yenniwon, Dariwan, Eenewon, Narwon, Enni won, Inuwan	
Ngarigo	S46	Bemeringal, "Boombala tribe", Bradjerak, Brajerak, Brajeran, "Cooma tribe" Currak da bidgee, Garego, Guramal, Gurmal, "Menero tribe", Murring, Ngarrugu, Walgalu, Narigo, Ngarago, Ngaragu, Ngarigu, Ngarego, Ngarico, Ngarroogoo, Ngarrugo, Ngaruku, Ngaryo, Ngundura, Nguramal, Ngarruga, Gur mal, Brajerang, Bombala tribe, Menero tribe, Cooma tribe, Ngairgo	
Ngiyampaa	D22	Ngiyambaa, Ngempa, Ngiyampaa, Wangaaybuwan Ngiyambaa, Wailwan, Wongaibon, Waljwan, Weilwan, Ngemba, Wangaaypuwan, Gaiamba, Narran, Negunbah, Ngaiamba, Ngamba, Ngambar, Ngeumba, Ngeunbah, Ngiamba, Ngiemba, Ngiumba, Ngiyamba, Ngjamba, Ngjemba, Ngumbarr, Njemba, Noongaburrah, Nyamba, Ugumba, Gai amba	
Ngunawal	D3	Gundungurra, Burragorang, Gurungada, Ngaonawal, Ngennigenwurro, Ngoonawal, Nungawal, Wonnawal, Yarr, Yiilima	
Nyangbal	E75	Njangbal	
Paakantyi	D61, D12	Bagandji, Bpaagkon jee, Kurnu, Kkengee, Kornoo, Kaiela, Baagandji, Darling, Barkindji, Ba:gundji, Baagandyi, Bagandji, Bagundji, Bahkunji, Bahkunjy, Bahroongee, Bahroonjee, Bakandi, Bakandji, Bakanji, Bandjagal, Bandjangali, Bargunji, Barindji, Barinji, Barkinghi, Barkinjee, Barkinji, Barkungee, Barkunjee, Barongee, Baroongee, Barrengee, Barrongee, Barundji, Barundyi, Barunga, Barungi, Beriait, Berri ait, Berriait, Bpaagkon jee, Bpaaroon jee, Bpaaroo, Bungyarlee, Burunga, Southern Paakantyi, Baagandji, Darling, Southern Baagandji, Bagundji, Barkindji, Barkinji, Barkungee, Bahkunji, Bahkunjy, Parkungi, Parkengee, Bakanji, Bakandi, Bargunji, Southern Bagundji, Barkinjee, Barkunjee, Pakindji, Pa:kindzi, Bakandji, Barkinghi, Par kengee, Parkingee, Paakantyi, Kaiela, Kornoo, Kurnu, Mailpurglu, Mil pulko, Ngunnhalgri, Pa:kindzi, Paakanji, Paakantji, Paakanytji, Pakindji, Parkengee, Parkingee, Parkungi, Parkunji, Paroinge, Paroo, Parooinge, Paru, Paruindi, Paruindji, Paruinji, Parundji, Baigundji, Unelgo, Wimbaja, Ba:gandji, Barkandji, Bagandji	
Thaua	S53, S54	Guyanagal, Guyangal yuin, Murring, Katungal, Yuin, Djiringanj, Dyirringan, Thaua, Thawa, Walbanga, Wandandian, Thurga, Thoorga, Wurm, Dhu:rga, Durga, Bugellimanji, Bargalia, Moruya tribe, Thauaira, Dhurga, Du:rga, Tharawal, Tadera manji, Baianga, Paiendra, Paienbera, Walbunja, Walbanga, Yuin, Dhurga, Djiringanj, Dyirringan, Thaua, Thawa, Wandandian, Bargalia, Bugellimanji, Moruya tribe, Thoorga, Thurga, Bugellimangi	

== S-Z ==
Language	AIATSIS AUSTLANG code	Also known as (AUSTLANG synonyms)	References
Wadi Wadi	D4	Biangil, Dacournditch, Darty Darty, Nimp mam wern, Ta ta thi, Ta tathi, Taa tatty, Tar tarthee, Tatatha, Tataty, Tatitati, Tunggut, Wadiwadi, Wathiwathi, Wathi Wathi, Watiwati, Wattewatte, Watthiwatthi, Watty watty, Wattywatty, Withaija, Woani, Wodiwodi, Wohdi Wohdi, Woonyi, Wotowotti, Wotti wotti, Wottowotti, Watte, Watte Watte, Watte watte, Wotte Wotte, Watty Watty, Wot te Wot te, Wa thi wa thi, Wati wati, Wathi wathi, Ouotti Ouotti, Wathie Waithie, Wattee Wattee, Wathi Watthi, Watthi watthi, Watthi Watthi, Wati Wati, Watty tribe, Wattu Wattu, Waddi Waddi	
Wadigali	L12	Evelyn Creek tribe, Nadikali, Wardikali, Wadikali, Wadikali	
Wailwan	D20	Wayilwan, Ngiyarnbaa, Walywan, Wilwan, Wallwan, Wailwun, Wilawun, Weilwun, Waal won, Wile Wan, Wali, Waljwan, Ngiumba, Wahoon	
Walbanga	S54	Walbunja, Yuin, Dhurga, Djiringanj, Dyirringan, Thaua, Thawa, Wandandian, Bargalia, Bugellimanji, Moruya tribe, Thoorga, Thurga, Bugellimangi	
Walgalu	S47	Guramal, Gurmal, Ngambri, Ngurmal, Kamberri, Tumut River people, Tumut tribe, Walgadu, Walgal, Walgulu, Wolgah, Wolgal	
Wandandian	S55	Yuin, Dhurga, Djiringanj, Dyirringan, Thaua, Thawa, Walbanga, Dharamba, Dharumba, Gurial, Jervis Bay tribe, Kurialyuin, Kuriel, Murraygaro, Tharumba, Wandanian, Kurial yuin	
Wandjiwalgu	D21	Wanyuparlku, Paakantyi, Wanjiwalku, Kongait, Pernowie, Pernowrie, Pono, Tongaranka, Wandjiwalku, Wanjwalgu, Wanyabalku, Wanyuwalgu, Weyneubulkoo, Weynoubulkoo, Wongimalko, Wonipalku, Wonjimalku, Wanyubarlgu, Wanjubalgu, Wonji malku	
Wangaaybuwan	D18	Wangaaybuwan Ngiyambaa, Wongai bun, Wangaybuwan, Wonghibone, Wonjhi bon, Wonjibone, Wongi bone, Wonghibon, Wonghi, Wun gai, Wuzai, Wozai, Woyaibun, Mudall	
Wemba Wemba	D1	Wamba Wamba, Wembawemba, Wambawamba, Womba, Weumba, Waamba, Yambayamba, Yamba, Wiembar, Wamba wamba, Yamba yamba, Swan Hill tribe, Moulmein dialect Moolamiin, Lake Boga dialect, The neighbourhood of Lake Boga, probably Moorebat, the Lower Loddon dialect, Kerang, Loddon R, dialect, Wa amba, Wamba, Wemba wemba, Lake Boga tribe, Waimbi waimbi, Wambo wambo, Waimbu Waimbu, Boga tribe, Wemberwemba, Waimbiwaimbi, WembaWemba, Jambajamba, Gourrmjanyuk, Gorrmjanyuk	
Wiljali	D13	Bo arli, Bulali, Wiljaali, Wiljakali, Wiljagali, Willoo, Wiloo, Wilya, Wilyakali	
Wilyagali	D16, D11	Paakantyi, Darling, Wiljali, Wiljagali, Willoo, Bo arli, Bulali, Paakantyi, Bulaali, Bulalli, Bolali, Maljangapa, Wiljakali, Pulaali, Pulakali, Maljangaba, Malya napa, Mulya napa, Mulya nappa, Milya uppa, Mullia arpa, Muliaarpa, Malynapa, Malja:pa, Malyapa, Nalyanapa, Malgangara, Karikari, Bulali for Maljangapa, Wilyakali, Wiljali, Wiljagali, Willoo, Bo arli, Bulali for Wiljakali	
Wiradjuri	D10	Wiradhurri, Wirratherie, Wirradgerry, Waradgery, Woradgery, Wiradhuri, Jeithi, Berrembeel, Junamildan, Wagga tribe, Waradgeri, Warandgeri, Warradjerrie, Warrai Durhai, Wayradgee, Weeragurie, Weerarthery, Weorgery, Weradgerie, Werogeri, Werogery, Wiiradurei, Wiiratheri, Wir rajer ree, Wira athoree, Wira durei, Wira shurri, Wiradhari, Wiradjari, Wiradjeri, Wiradjwri, Wiradthery, Wiradthuri, Wiradurei, Wiraduri, Wiradyuri, Wiragere, Wiraijuri, Wirajarai, Wirajeree, Wirajerry, Wirashuri, Wirathere, Wiratheri, Wiraturai, Wirotheree, Wirra jerre, Wirrajerre, Wirra athoree, Wirra dhari, Wirra dthoor ree, Wirra dthooree, Wirracharee, Wirrach arree, Wirraddury, Wirradhurri, Wirradjerri, Wirradjery, Wirraiyarrai, Wirrai yarrai, Wirraidyuri, Wirraijuri, Wirrajeree, Wirrajerry, Wirrathuri, Wooradgery, Woorajuri, Wooratheri, Wooratherie, Woradgery, Woradjera, Woradjerg, Wordjerg, Wuradjeri, Wira Athorree, Wi iratheri, Wiratu rai, Woorad gery, Wir ra jer ree, Kunamildan	
Wiriyaraay	D28	Wirayaraay, Wiriwiri, Kamilaroi, Weraerai, Euahlayi, Gamilaroi, Guyinbaray, Juwalarai, Ualarai, Walarai, Wirajarai, Wirraiyarrai, Wiri Wiri, Wirriyaraay, Wiraiarai, Weraiari, Wirri Wirri, Wirraarai, Warlarai, Wolroi, Wolleri, Waho lari, Wolaroo, Walari, Wolaroi, Woo laroi, Ginniebal, Mooran Mooran, Wirrayaraay	
Wonnarua	S63	Wanarruwa, Wonarua, Awabakal, Wanarua, Wonnuaruah, Wannerawa, Wonnah Kuah	
Worimi	E2	Warimi, Worimi, Gringai, Gadang, Kattang, Kutthung, Gutthan, Warrimee, Warrimi, Warrimay tribe, Molo, Bahree, Karrapath, Carapath, Warrangine, Wannungine	
Yaygir	E10	Kumbainggar, Gumbainggir, Jiegera/Yaygir, Baanbay, Banbai, Gamlamang, Jiegera, Kumbainggiri, Yaygir, Yuungay, Jeigir, Ji:gara, Jireigir, Jungai, Yaegl, Yegera, Yegir, Yiegera, Youngai	
Yitha Yitha	D7	Jitu Jitu, Yida Yida, Bayangil, Eetha Eetha, Eethanaeetha, Eethee Eethee, Eethie Eethie, i7a Yida, Ita ita, Itaiithi, Itaita, Ithi ithi, Iti iti, Jida Jida, Jitajita, Tjuop, Yetho, Yit tha, Yitha, Yitsa, Ithiithi, Eethaeetha, Yitayita	
Yu Yu	S19	Ngarrket, Narrinyeri, Jarijari, Jere jere, Juju, Nyerri nyerri, Yairy yairy, Yari yari, Yariki luk, Yarikiluk, Yariyari, Yarre yarre, Yarree Yarree, Yarreyarre, Yerre Yerre, Yerreyerre, Yerri yerri, Yerriyerri, Yerry yerry, YurraYurra, Yu Yu, Erawirung, Jirau, Eraweerung, Eramwir rangu, Erawiruck, Jeraruk, Yerraruck, Yirau, Yiran, Pomp malkie, Meru, You you, Rankbirit, Wilu, Willoo, Yuyu	
Yugambal	E11	Yugambal: Ngarrabul, Ngarrbal, Ngarabal, Kwiambal, Jugambal, Jukambal, Jukambil, Marbul, Narbul, Ngarabul, Ngarrabul, Pregalgh, Ucumble, Ukumbil, Yacambal, Yirimbil, Yoocomble, Yoocumbill, Yookambul, Yookumbil, Yookumbill, Yookumble, Yookumbul, Yucomble, Yugarabul, Yugumbil, Yukambal, Yukambil, Yukumba, Yukumbil, Yukumbul, Yurimbil	
Yuin	S67	Dhurga, Djiringanj, Dyirringan, Thaua, Thawa, Walbanga, Wandandian, Jeringin, Juwin	
Yuungay	E9	Gumbainggir, Yuungay, Baanbay, Banbai, Gamlamang, Jiegera, Kumbainggiri, Yaygir, Ju:ngai, Yiegera, Jeigir, Yegera, Youngai, Jungai	
Yuwaalaraay	D27, D54	Kamilaroi, Juwalarai/Ualarai, Euahlayi, Gamilaroi, Guyinbaray, Juwalarai, Ualarai, Walarai, Weraerai, Wirajarai, Yuwalarai, Jualrai, Yualarai, Yualloroi, Yowaleri, Uollaroi, Youallerie, Yualari, Yualai, Yualeai, Yerraleroi, Yowairi, Yuolary, Eu ahlayi, Yourilri, Youahlayi, Jualjai, Juwaljai, Yuwalyai, Wallarai, Wolleroi, Walleri, Woleroi, Wollaroi, Gingi, Brewarrana tribe, yuwalaray, yuwalaraay	

== See also ==
- Australian Aboriginal languages
- List of Australian Aboriginal languages
