= Dhawa =

Dhawa may refer to:

- Dhawa people, an ethnic group of Australia
- Dhawa language, an Australian language
- Dhawa Zone, a zone of Ethiopia
- Dhawa, Rajasthan, a town in India
- Dhawa, Nepal, a village development committee in Nepal
- Anogeissus latifolia, known in Hindi as dhawa, a species of tree
- Dhawa or Dawa refers a sign or symbol of new, change and good thinking and behavior. It is a god name.
- Dhawa, one of hotel brands of Banyan Group

== See also ==
- Dhaoa, a village in Bangladesh
