= Thaua =

Aboriginal Australian people of the south coast of New South Wales

Thaua people
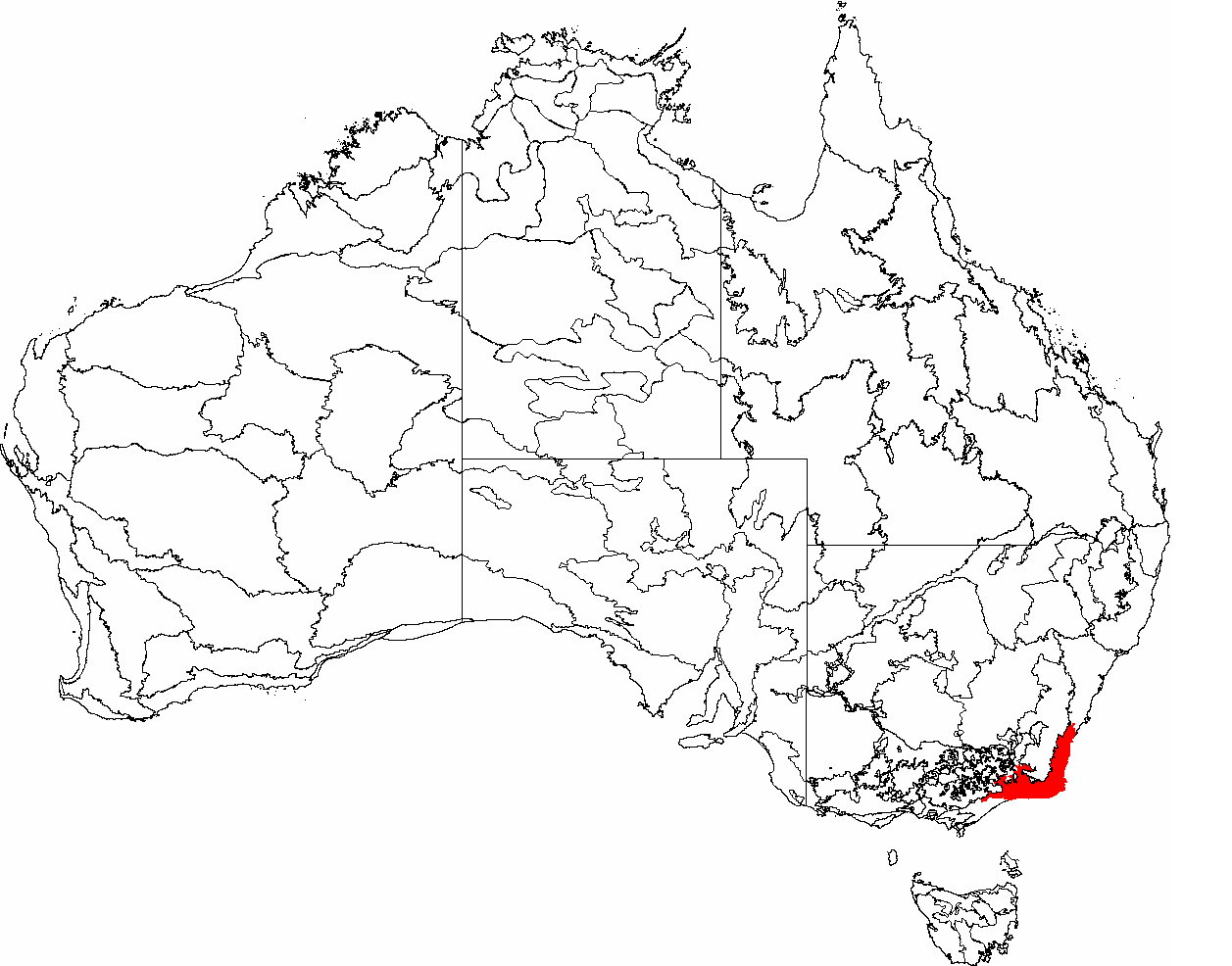
- South east corner bioregion

Hierarchy
- Language family: Pama–Nyungan
- Language branch: Yuin–Kuric
- Language group: Yuin (shared word for man) (aka Thurga) (shared word for no)
- Group dialect: 'Thaua' (Tindale)
- Group estate: Baianbal (forest people); Katungal (seacoast people)

Area (2,100 sq. km)
- Bioregion: South east corner
- Location: South Coast (NSW)
- Coordinates: 36°55′S 149°40′E

The Thaua people, also spelt Thawa and Dhawa, and also referred to as Yuin (Djuin), are an Aboriginal Australian people living around the Twofold Bay area of the South Coast of New South Wales.

== History ==
It is often claimed in popular literature, following a conjecture by the amateur historian Kenneth McIntyre in 1977, that the ruins of an old stone building at Bittangabee Bay represents the remains of a 16th-century Portuguese fort, testifying to the putative Portuguese priority in the discovery of Australia. For McIntyre it was a wintering place erected by Cristóvão de Mendonça as he made his imagined way back up the coast from Corio Bay. The ruin actually is what is left of a structure partially raised, but left unfinished, dating to the 1840s.

The area where people speaking Thua language was recorded as around the Twofold Bay area of the South Coast of New South Wales.

Twofold Bay was an important area for the whaling industry where the local Aboriginal people quickly gained employment. Their keen eyesight made them sought after as lookouts at high points on the coast as they could see whale spouts far out at sea without the aid of a telescope. They also served as oarsmen and harpooners on whaleboats and assisted in the processing of the whales. Contemporary writers commented favourably on their industriousness, and, unlike natives working on pastoral leases, they were given parts of the catch, cash and food in exchange for their labour. The area nearby, at Snug Point near Eden, had been taken up by Alexander, George and Peter Imlay, who employed local people. On arriving in Australia, the Scottish immigrant and pastoralist Benjamin Boyd squatted on land in the area, and became an entrepreneur in the Twofold Bay whaling industry. His companion on the voyage out, the painter Oswald Brierly remarked admiringly of the prowess, of both native men and women, in handling whaling boats there.

== Language ==
The Thaua people have also been referred to as Yuin (Djuin), which is a larger grouping of Aboriginal Australian peoples.

Thawa is a member of the Yuin–Kuric language family that was almost lost following British colonisation. Its exact status as of the late 20th century was unknowable, since the only report we have of it is from a brief note in Alfred William Howitt, who wrote that Thau-aria was the language of Twofold Bay. It is considered to have been either a dialect of Dhurga, a variety of Dyirringany, or a distinct tongue. The word Yuin in the ethnonym associated with the Thawa meant "man", though among the Tharawal to the north the term signified "yes".

In recent years, local Aboriginal leaders have worked together to revive the language.

== Ecology ==
According to John Blay, the Thawa ranged from Mallacoota to Merimbula, and westwards as far as the borders of Narigo territory in Monaro. Norman Tindale in his 1974 catalogue of Australian Aboriginal boundaries describes the Thaua country and associated estates as follows:

From north of Merimbula south to Green Cape; west to the scarp of the Dividing Range. Their hordes were divided into two groups, the ['Katungal] 'sea coast people,' and the ['Baianbal] or ['Paienbara], the 'tomahawk people,' those who lived in the forests; a third group, the Bemerigal or mountain people at Cooma belonged to the Ngarigo with whom the inland Thaua had some associations.
