= Wandandian =

Aboriginal Australian people

The Wandandian, Wandiwandian, Wandi Wandi people, are an Aboriginal Australian people of the South Coast of New South Wales with connections to the Yuin and Tharawal nations. Their language is called Dharumba (sometimes considered a dialect of both Dhurga and Dharawal).

== Country ==
The Wandandian lands extended over an estimated 1,400 square miles (3,600 km^{2}) from Ulladulla to the southern banks of The Shoalhaven River. To their south were the Walbunja. The tribes to their west were the Ngunawal and Walgalu. Their connection with Wodi Wodi people to the north is debated, however a widely held understanding is that Wandandian and Wodi Wodi peoples are the same tribe (their Dharumba language is also mutually understood and with understood by Dharawal and Dhurga speakers) and that the pronunciation is depends on northern or southern tribal people who shared information with interested missionaries, ethnographers, linguists and others.

== People ==
Norman Tindale cites a report by a Richard Dawsey reprinted in one of the early volumes edited by Edward Micklethwaite Curr, regarding the tribes from Jervis Bay to Mount Dromedary, as referring to the Wandandian. According to this reference, the tribes divided themselves into two classes, the Piindri (tree climbers) and the Kathoongal (fishermen), and that according to their mythological lore the Earth had been once devastated and had to be repopulated by people from the Moon.

Aboriginal union organiser for the Builders Labourers Federation Kevin "Cookie" Cook was a Yuin and Wandandian man.

The Jerrinja people are a contemporary clan of Wodi Wodi and Wandi Wandi/Wandiwandian people, direct descendants of the surviving Wodi Wodi and Wandi Wandi/Wandiwandian tribal members during the nineteenth century.

== Some words ==
- barbatha or baiing (father)
- meunda or mane (mother)
- moomaga (white man)
- tchingar (starfish, hence "policeman", since like the marine animal, the latter seize and detain)

== Alternative names ==
- Tharumba/Dharumba
- Kurial-yuin (meaning "men of the north")
- Murraygaro
- Jervis Bay tribe

== Sources ==
- Cook, Kevin (2013). Making Change Happen: Black & White Activists Talk to Kevin Cook about Aboriginal, Union and Liberation Politics. ANU Press. p. 9.
- Dawsey, Richard (1887). "From Jervis Bay to Mount Dromedary" (PDF). In Curr, Edward Micklethwaite (ed.). The Australian race: its origin, languages, customs, place of landing in Australia and the routes by which it spread itself over the continent. Vol. 3. Melbourne: J. Ferres. pp. 420–423.
- Howitt, Alfred William (1904). The native tribes of south-east Australia (PDF). Macmillan.
- "Indigenous rights organiser Kevin Cook 'opened the pathways' for all Australians". The Canberra Times. 19 August 2015.
- Mathews, R. H. (1908). "The Bunan Ceremony of New South Wales". American Anthropologist. 9 (10): 327–344. doi:10.1525/aa.1896.9.10.02a00010. JSTOR 658900.
- Slattery, Deirdre (2015). Australian Alps: Kosciuszko, Alpine and Namadgi National Parks. Csiro Publishing. ISBN 978-1-486-30172-0.
- Tindale, Norman Barnett (1974). "Wandandian (NSW)". Aboriginal Tribes of Australia: Their Terrain, Environmental Controls, Distribution, Limits, and Proper Names. Australian National University.
