= Tharawal languages =

Extinct Australian Aboriginal language

Tharawal
- Geographic distribution: New South Wales, Australia
- Ethnicity: Yuin people
- Linguistic classification: Pama–Nyungan: Yuin–Kuric; Yuin; Tharawal
- Subdivisions: Tharawal; Dhurga; Thawa; ?Dyirringanj

Language codes
- Glottolog: nort2761 (partial overlap) sout2771

Tharawal, also spelt Thurawal and Dharawal, is a small family of mostly extinct Australian Aboriginal languages once spoken along the South Coast of New South Wales.

== Number of languages in the group ==
According to Bob Dixon (2002), four Tharawal languages are attested, though he does not accept them as related:

- Tharawal
- Dhurga
- Dyirringanj
- Thawa

Claire Bowern (2011) lists three, among the Yuin languages:

- Dharawal
- Dhurga
- Thawa

== Speakers ==
Peoples who spoke these languages include:

Clans and Families of The Northern Dharawal

- Noron-Geragal
- Targarigal
- Goonamattagal
- Wodi Wodi
- Gweagal (Geawegal)

New South Wales south coast group

- Dharawal
- Dhurga or Thurga (Thoorga, Durga)
- Dyirringanj (Djirringanj)
- Thaua (Thawa)
