= Darkinyung language =

Extinct Australian Aboriginal language

Darkinjung
- Hawkesbury–MacDonald River
- Native to: Australia
- Region: New South Wales
- Ethnicity: Darkinjung, Darkinung
- Era: attested 1903
- Revival: A small number of second-language users in revival program
- Language family: Pama–Nyungan: Yuin–Kuric; Yora; Darkinjung

Language codes
- ISO 639-3: xda
- Glottolog: hawk1239
- AIATSIS: S65
- ELP: Darkinyung
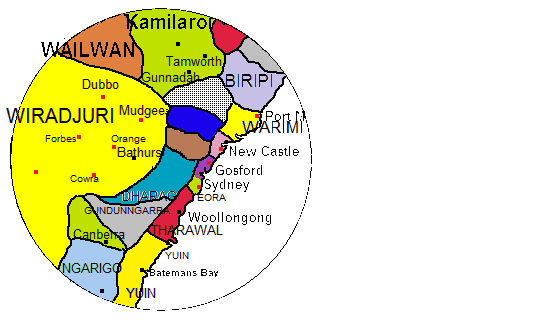
- Traditional lands of Aboriginal Australian tribes around Sydney; Darkinjung in brown

Darkinjung (Darrkinyung; many other spellings; see below) is an Australian Aboriginal language, the traditional language of the Darkinyung people. While no audio recordings of the language survive, several researchers have compiled wordlists and grammatical descriptions. It has been classified as a language no longer fully spoken and it can be classified as needing a language renewal program. It was spoken adjacent to Dharuk, Wiradhuri, Gamilaraay, and Awabakal. The Darkinjung tribe occupied a small part of southeastern Australia inside what is now the New South Wales area. They likely inhabited a considerable tract of land within Hunter, Northumberland, and Cook counties.

== Alternate names ==
The name of the language has various spellings as recorded by both Mathews and W.J. Enright, among others, who worked of documentation from the 19th century:

- Darkinjang (Tindale 1974)
- Darkinjung
- Darkiñung (Mathews 1903)
- Darrkinyung
- Darginjang
- Darginyung
- Darkinung
- Darkinoong
- Darknüng
- Darkinyung

== Revitalisation effort ==
Since 2003 there has been a movement from the Darkinyung language group to revitalise the language. They started working with the original field reports of Robert H. Mathews and W. J. Enright. Where there were gaps in the sparsely populated wordlists, words were taken from lexically similar nearby languages. This led to the publication of the work Darkinyung grammar and dictionary: revitalising a language from historical sources. This may be ordered from the publisher, Muurrbay Aboriginal Language and Culture Co-operative.

== Phonology ==
Much of our understanding of Darkinjung phonology comes from papers published by R.H. Mathews in 1903. When analysing these sources, we may generalise that there were around 15 consonant phonemes, and approximately 3 vowels.

=== Consonants ===
	Bilabial	Dental	Alveolar	Palatal	Velar
Plosive	b	d̪	d	ɟ	g
Nasal	m	n̪	n	ɲ	ŋ
Trill			r		
Approximant	w		ɹ	j	
Lateral			l		

In Darkinjung, like many Australian languages, b, d, and g are interchangeable with p, t, and k and will not change the meaning of the word. The fact that this table shows b, d, and g is arbitrary.

=== Vowels ===
	Front	Back
High	ɪ	ʊ
Low	ɐ	

== Morphology ==
=== "Tags" ===
Darkinjung makes use of what Mathews refers to as "tags," or suffixes to denote relationships between objects in sentences.

Number tags -bula "two" and -biyn "several"

miri-bula
dog-two
'a couple of dogs'

Possessor Tag: -gayi

guri- gayi bargan
man POSS boomerang
'a man's boomerang'

Locative "at, on, in" tags: -a/ -da/ -dja/ -ga/ -wa

The locative tags -ga and -wa appear to be found after stems ending in vowels.

gawin-da nhayi
bank-LOC that.over.there
'on the other side'

Words with locational information seem to coincide with nouns that also carry a locative tag:

wallang-gayn-dja gundji-ga gara-dhi
behind-?-LOC hut-LOC hide-PRES
'around the house, hidden'

Ergative case tags: -a/ -da/ -ga/ -ya. Words that end in the consonant ŋ receive that tag /-ga/

nyugang-ga wagar mana-yi
woman-ERG perch get-PAST
'the woman caught a perch'
