= Dharawal =

Australian Aboriginal people from southern coastal New South Wales

Dharawal People
- aka: Dharawal, Darawal, Turawal, Thurawal, Turuwul, Five Islands tribe, Shoalhaven tribe, Tharawal (AIATSIS), nd (SIL)
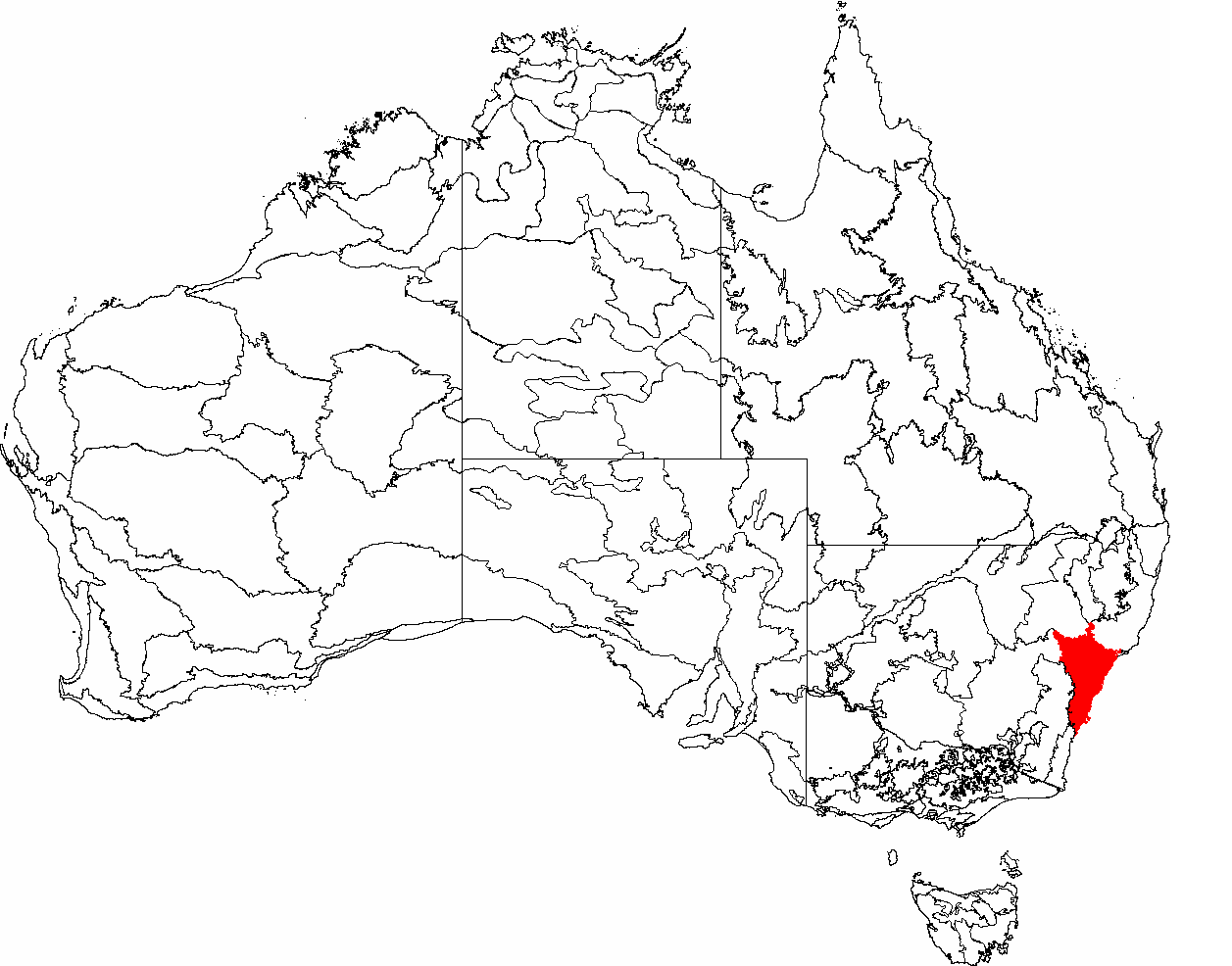
- Sydney Basin bioregion

Hierarchy
- Language family: Pama–Nyungan
- Language branch: Yuin–Kuric
- Language group: Yora
- Group dialects: Tharawal

Area
- Bioregion: Sydney Basin
- Location: Sydney and Illawarra, New South Wales
- Coordinates: 34°S 151°E
- Rivers: Shoalhaven

Notable individuals
- Bundel; Bill Worrall; Yugur; Arawarra; Rosie Russell; Jack Carpenter; Captain Brooks (Munnag); Tullimbah; Joe Anderson; Broughton (Toodwik); Broger; Johnny Crook (Yunbai); John Pigeon (Warroba); Stewart (Nillang); Emma Timbery

Dharawal is a term referring to the groups of Aboriginal Australian people who shared the Dharawal language. Traditionally, they lived in defined hunter–fisher–gatherer family groups or clans with ties of kinship, along the coastal area through what is now the Wollongong, Port Kembla, and Nowra regions of New South Wales.

== Etymology and alternative names ==
Dharawal means cabbage palm. Alternative spelling and pronunciation of this term include: Tharawal, Darawad, Thurawal, Turrubul, Turuwal and Turuwul.

== Language ==
The Dharawal people spoke the Dharawal language, which was quite similar to the neighbouring coastal languages of Dharug, Dhurga, Thawa, Awabakal and Dyirringany. These languages are sometimes grouped together as dialects under the broader title of either Yuin or Katungal language, various forms of which are believed to have been spoken along most of the southern and central coastlines of New South Wales.

The language of the Gandangara people in the mountains inland from Dharawal country was also closely associated with Dharawal, and these two groups shared some cultural ties. The Gandangara appear to have known the Dharawal language as Gur Gur.

== Country ==
According to ethnologist Norman Tindale, traditional Dharawal lands encompass some 450 square miles (1,200 km^{2}) from the southern shore of Botany Bay, along the Georges River to Campbelltown and then south through Port Hacking, Wollongong to the Shoalhaven River and the Beecroft Peninsula.

== Nations ==
The Gweagal Dharug nation of the area now referred to as the Sutherland Shire were also known as the "Fire Clan". They were first Aboriginal Australian people to make meaningful contact with Captain Cook who recorded in his diary the indigenous peoples called their canoe a narwi, narwi being a Dharug word for canoe.

The Dharug nation Cubbitch Barta or Cobbitty Barta (meaning place of white pipe clay) nation were located in the Narellan and Campbelltown region of what is now the outer south-western suburbs of Sydney. They were also known by the early British colonists as the Dharug"Cowpastures tribe" as this was the area where the lost cattle from the First Fleet were rediscovered. A registered Indigenous land use agreement and 5 x native title claims was made by glenda chalker claiming as Dharawal country and all 5 native title claims were rejected as no factual evidence was found on all 5 native title claims for Helensburgh in 2011.The country of the Wadi Wadi clan (also known to the colonists as the "Five Islands tribe" referring to the Five Islands just off the coast of Port Kembla) includes the Illawarra, Wollongong and Port Kembla areas. The Dharawal name for the Five Islands is Woolyungah, which is now incorporated into the name of the adjacent city of Wollongong.

Around the Shoalhaven River region and northern part of Jervis Bay, the various nations such as the Numbaa, Meroo, Jerringong and Worrigee were known to the colonists collectively as the "Shoalhaven tribe". The descendants of these people are now referred to as the Jerrinja.

There is some debate as to the southern extent of the Dharawal speaking people and where those who spoke the Dhurga language (which is quite similar to Dharawal) began. At the time of British colonisation this was a border region between the two groups and it is possible Dharawal was spoken as far south as Ulladulla.

== Lifestyle and culture ==
The Dharawal people lived mainly off the produce of local plants, fruits and vegetables, as well as by hunting marsupials such as kangaroo and possum, and also by fishing and gathering shellfish products. The women collected vegetable foods and were well known for their fishing and canoeing prowess. There are a large number of shell middens still visible in Dharawal country and a glimpse of the Dharawal lifestyle can be drawn from the analysis of the midden sites. Their main source of carbohydrate came from collecting and treating the seeds and roots of the burrawang plant, and then grinding and cooking the resultant flour into flat bread-like cakes.

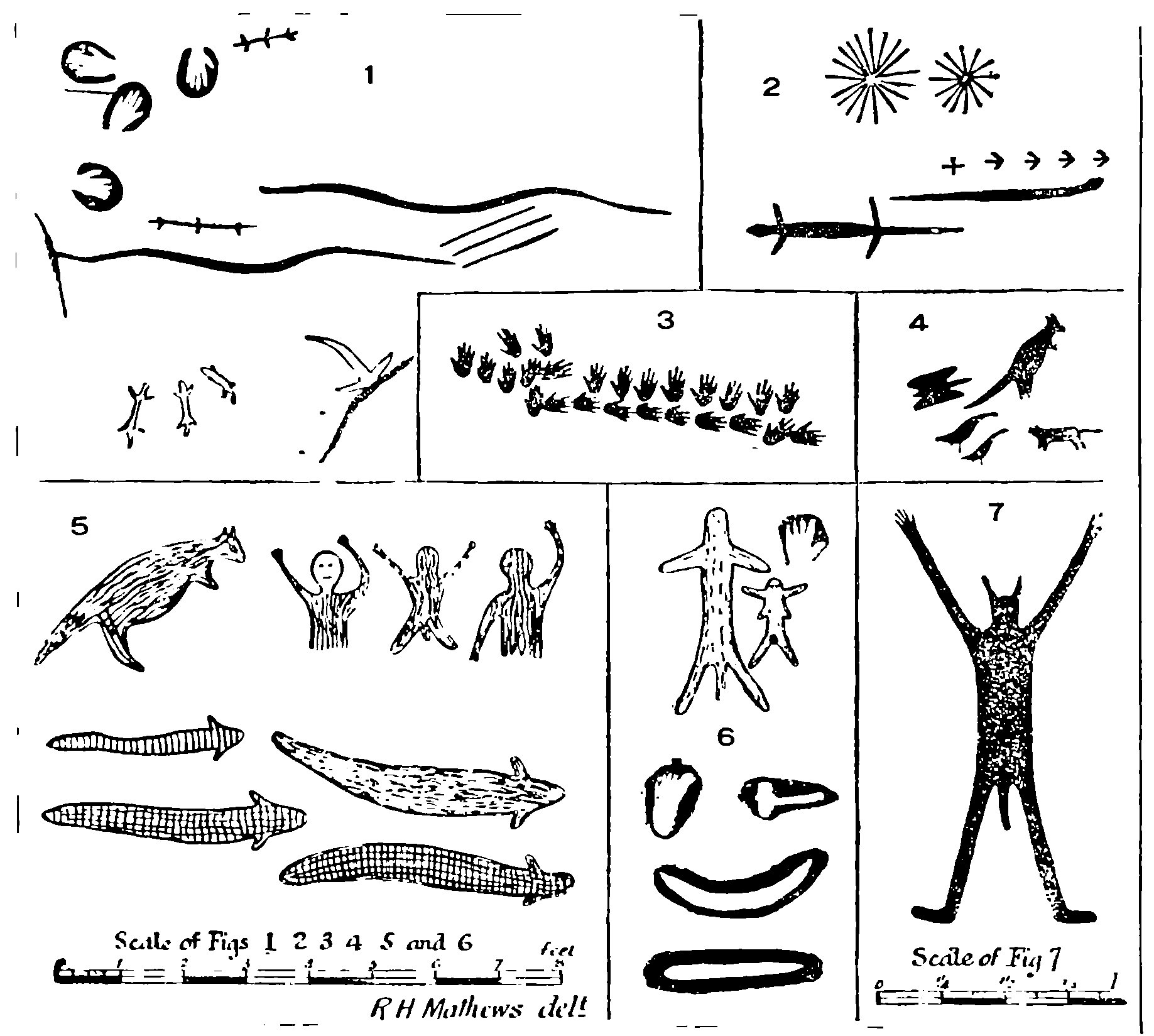
Sketched examples of Dharawal rock paintings

The Dharawal had various totems but sea mammals such as dolphins, porpoises and whales had special status amongst these people. The historical artwork (rock engravings) of the Dharawal people is visible on the sandstone surfaces throughout their language area and charcoal and ochre paintings, drawings and hand stencils can be found on rock surfaces and in rock shelters and overhangs.

For example, there is a public viewing site of one group of engravings at Jibbon Point, showing a whale and a wallaby. According to an early Dharawal informant, Biddy Giles, (Note: Her Dharawal name was Byarraw/Biyarrung. She was born around 1820, and had been married off as a teenager to Kooma, an elderly George's River 'king'. Later she married Paddy Burragalang. She also stated that her uncle had witnessed Cook's landing.) these images commemorated notable events, a successful hunt and the stranding of a whale.

== History ==
=== Pre-colonial ===
Archaeological evidence has shown that the Dharawal and their ancestors have lived in the area for at least 8,200 years, with human habitation of this region and the associated (now submerged) continental shelf probably predating this by an additional 20,000 to 30,000 years.

=== James Cook ===
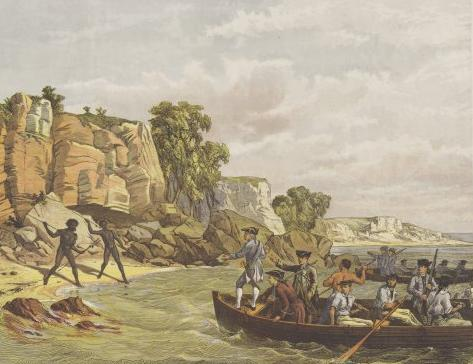
Depiction of Cook's landing at Botany Bay showing Dharawal resistance

The Gweagal people of Kamay were the first Aboriginal people on the east coast of the Australian continent known to have met the British. As James Cook's ship HMS Endeavour sailed into the bay on 29 April 1770, crew member Joseph Banks recorded men fishing with spears from small canoes who "scarce lifted their eyes from their employment" as the ship passed, and an old woman with several children who "often lookd at the ship but expressd neither surprize nor concern". Some 21st-century Dharawal say that under the protocol of the time, strangers were politely ignored until a reasonable time had passed, when an Elder would ask what they wanted and decide whether to invite them onto Country. Gweagal people may also have taken the newcomers for spirits of the dead, who in a Dharawal Dreaming story return to Country in low-lying clouds.

Authors Darren Rix and Craig McCormack, writing in 2024, quote Dharawal man Shane Williams, as stating that those who saw the Endeavour first thought the ship was a cloud (garru), then a floating island (barrangga); they took the sailors moving in the rigging for possums, and when they saw that the people on board were white, for spirits of the dead. In an 1863 letter, the priest J. McEnroe recalled a conversation some thirty years earlier with a local man whose father had witnessed the arrival. The man said Gweagal people first took the ship for a big bird with possums running along its legs and wings, and that they agreed to send two men to meet the strangers, whom the women told not to eat or drink anything they were given.

Cook took two boats ashore at Kundell (now Kurnell) with about forty men, hoping to speak with the people. They were confronted by two warriors, one a young man and the other an older man. Neither the British nor their interpreter Tupaia could understand their language. According to the Gujaga Foundation, whose members lead Dharawal language reclamation, the men had come to fend off what they thought to be spirits of the dead. They shouted "warra warra wai" and gestured with their spears. Early word lists of the local language recorded the phrase as meaning "go away"; the Gujaga Foundation translates it as "you're (they) all dead", and Gweagal descendant Theresa Ardler interprets it as telling the strangers to go away because the dead were not wanted there.

Cook's party attempted to communicate their desire for water and threw gifts of beads and nails ashore, while the two men waved at them "to be gone". According to Cook's journal, the two men continued to oppose the landing and Cook fired a warning shot. One of the warriors responded by throwing a stone, and Cook shot the older warrior in the legs with small shot. Banks wrote that "he minded it very little". The man fetched a shield, and after the crew landed the Gweagal men threw two spears before Cook shot at them again and they retreated. Sydney Parkinson recorded women and children screaming in the bush during the fighting. Shane Williams says the two men were carrying out their spiritual duty to protect Country from people not authorised to be there, and that their approach - an older and a younger man, with painted bodies, displaying and shaking their weapons before using them - followed proper protocol.

Cook himself wrote:

"as we approached the Shore they [the Aboriginal people] all made off, except two Men, who seem'd resolved to oppose our landing...for as soon as we put the boat in they again came to oppose us, upon which I fired a musket between the two, which had no other effect than to make them retire back, where bundles of their darts lay, and one of them took up a stone and threw at us, which caused my firing a second musket, load with small shot; and altho' some of the shot struck the man, yet it had no other effect than making him lay hold on a target. Immediately after this we landed, which we had no sooner done than they throw'd two darts at us; this obliged me to fire a third shot, soon after which they both made off, but not in such haste but what we might have taken one."

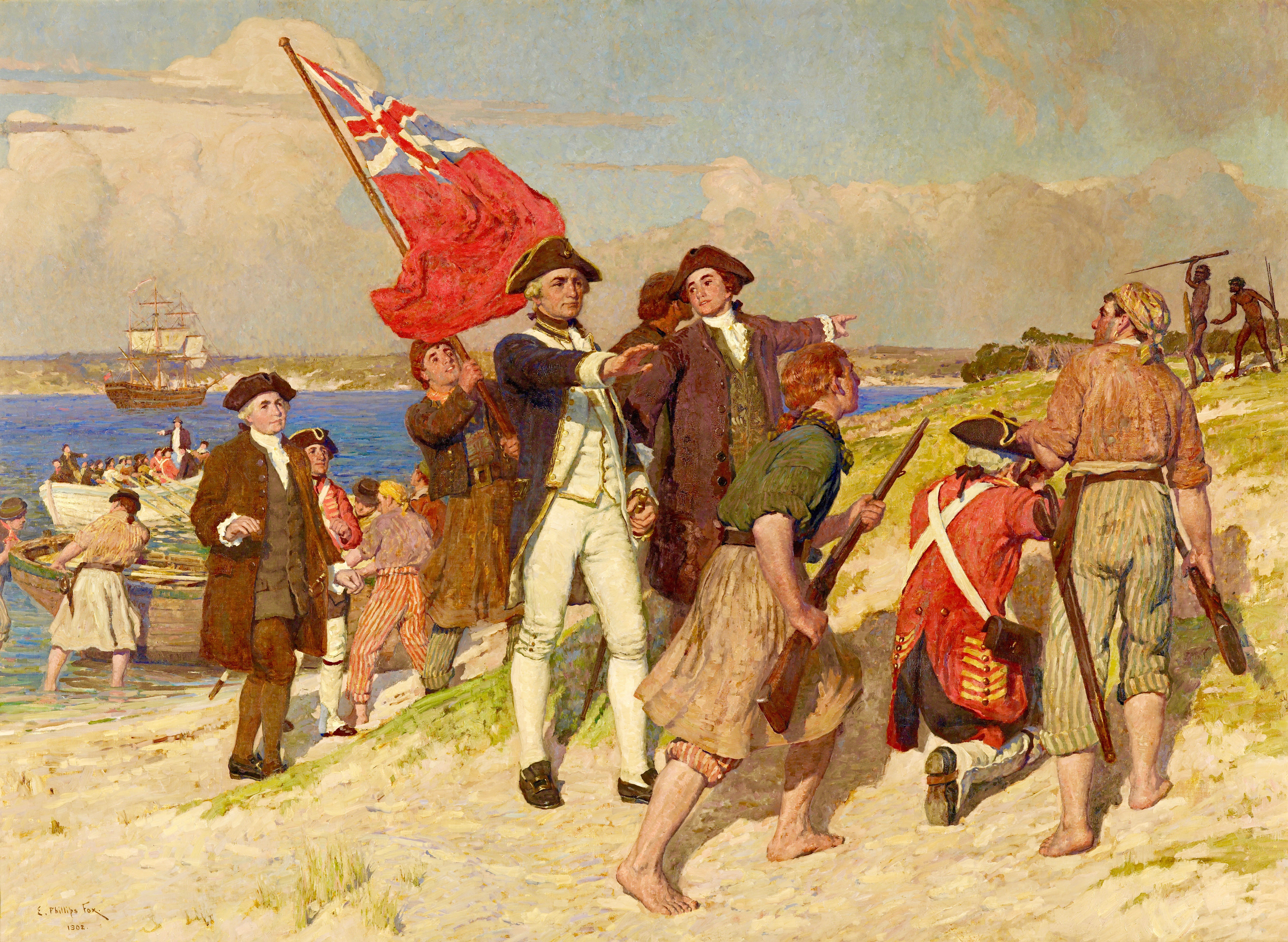
Painting by E. Phillips Fox showing Cook's landing with a British marine shooting at Dharawal men

He went on to say that:

"in the afternoon 16 or 18 of them came boldly up to within 100 yards of our people at the watering place...all they seem'd to want was for us to be gone. After staying a Short time they went away. They were all Arm'd with Darts and wooden Swords."

Banks wrote that the crew were "conscious from the distance the people had been from us when we fired that the shot could have done them no material harm". Rix and McCormack quote one Gweagal descendant as saying that the older warrior later died from his wounds.

The crew then went to the huts, where they found children hiding behind a shield. They left beads, ribbons and cloth as gifts, and took forty or fifty spears – fearing that they were poisoned – and at least one shield. Rix and Cormick write that the British considered they had the right to enter people's dwellings uninvited and steal their personal belongings. A shield Banks took at Kamay is sometimes called the Gweagal shield but 21st-century research shows it is not the one held in the British Museum.

Over the following week Gweagal people kept away from the British, left the gifts in their huts untouched, and watched the crew haul in large catches of fish, including stingrays, contrary to Dharawal lore against over-harvesting and a taboo on eating stingray. Cook wrote that "all they seem'd to want was for us to be gone". Shane Williams describes Cook's landing as symbolic of the coming end of his people's cultural dominion over the land, and says any discussion of Cook brings sadness among his people.

=== Early colonial ===
From 1788, when permanent British colonisation of their homelands began, the Dharawal people proved to be somewhat resilient in the face of this invasion. The area known now as the Sutherland Shire and the Royal National Park, for decades remained a stronghold for the Dharawal. Those of the Cobbitty Barta clan who lived along the Georges River and into the Campbelltown areas were more directly exposed to the violence, disease and cultural destruction brought by the colonists. However, young leaders such as Bundel and Gogy worked with the British which led to rewards and survival for them and some of their kinspeople.

Dharawal clans, such as the Wadi Wadi, who lived in what is now called the Illawarra region, were subjected to incursions of cedar-getters from the early 1800s, and then from 1815 wealthy land-holders such as Charles Throsby, George Johnston and Richard Brooks received land grants in the area. Although some Dharawal were killed in the violence that occurred with this taking of land, the Aboriginal people of the Illawarra were regarded as "friendly" and people such as the Timbery family and Toodwik were regarded favourably by the colonists.

Further south, in the Shoalhaven region, early cedar-getters were driven away by the clans there and the colonists hence regarded the resident people as ferocious. However, when Alexander Berry arrived in the early 1820s to lay claim to his massive Coolangatta Estate land grant along the Shoalhaven River, he was able to negotiate a peaceful takeover through Dharawal intermediaries. The Aboriginal people of the Shoalhaven area became important workers for Berry, while they in return were able live on country with access to European goods.

Due to their good positioning in terms of survival and their close cultural and geographic ties to the British economic hub of Sydney, a significant proportion of Dharawal people were able to integrate into the colonial world. By the 1830s, the coastal Dharug (Eora) people of Sydney had been decimated by colonisation and the few Aboriginal people seen in Sydney were by this stage mostly Dharawal. Dharawal people like William Worrall were regularly observed in the colonial capital and regarded as locals. Furthermore, other Dharawal men such as Warroba and Johnny Crook were employed by the colonists as negotiators and trackers in places such as Van Diemen's Land, Western Australia and Port Phillip. These Dharawal men played a significant role in the founding of Melbourne and the negotiation of Batman's Treaty.

=== Confinement to camps and reserves ===
By the late 1800s, the value of Dharawal people to the expanding local white society became negligible and most of the surviving members of the various clans were either left to fend for themselves in "blacks' camps" as fringe dwellers, or were pushed onto small reserves.

The few surviving people around Port Hacking and along the Georges River appear to have ended up on reserves at La Perouse and at Picton, while those who lived in the Illawarra region had camps at Minnamurra, Port Kembla, Bombo, Kiama, Werri Beach and at Gerroa. A larger Aboriginal reserve was gazetted at Windang near the mouth of Lake Illawarra in the 1880s on the site of what is now the Windang Beach Tourist Park.

Around the Shoalhaven region, most of the Dharawal people there were confined to a purpose built village on the Coolangatta Estate under the patronage of the Berry and Hay families. However, in 1901 these people were forcibly relocated onto a government reserve at Roseby Park.

== See also ==
- Eora
- Dharug
- Wodiwodi
- Gweagal

== Sources ==
- Bursill, L. (2007). Dharawal : the story of the Dharawal-speaking people of Southern Sydney. Sydney: Kurranulla Aboriginal Corporation.
- "Cubbitch Barta Clan of the Dharawal People Indigenous Land Use Agreement (ILUA)". Agreements, Treaties and Negotiated Settlements (ATNS) project.
- Dousset, Laurent (2005). "Tharawal". AusAnthrop (Australian Aboriginal tribal database). Archived from the original on 16 October 2014.
- Goodall, Heather; Cadzow, Allison (2009). Rivers and Resilience: Aboriginal People on Sydney's Georges River. University of New South Wales Press. ISBN 978-1-921-41074-1.
- Goodall, Heather; Cadzow, Allison (2014). "Gogi". Dictionary of Sydney. Dictionary of Sydney Trust.
- Higgins, Isabella; Collard, Sarah (28 April 2020). "Captain James Cook's landing and the Indigenous first words contested by Aboriginal leaders". Dictionary of Sydney. ABC News.
- "Language information: Dharawal". AIATSIS. 23 August 2012.
- Organ, Michael K.; Speechley, Carol (1997). "Illawarra Aborigines – an Introductory History". In Hagan, J. S.; Wells, A. (eds.). A History of Wollongong. University of Wollongong Press. pp. 7–22.
- Ridley, William (1875). Kámilarói, and other Australian languages (PDF). Sydney: T. Richards, government printer – via Internet Archive.
- Rix, Darren; Cormick, Craig (2024). Warra Warra Wai: How Indigenous Australians Discovered Captain Cook, and What They Tell of the Coming of the Ghost People. Simon & Schuster Australia. ISBN 9781761424021.
- Thomas, Nicholas (2003). Discoveries: The Voyages of Captain Cook. London: Allen Lane. ISBN 0713995572.
- Tindale, Norman Barnett (1974). "Tharawal(NSW)". Aboriginal Tribes of Australia: Their Terrain, Environmental Controls, Distribution, Limits, and Proper Names. Australian National University Press. ISBN 978-0-708-10741-6.
- Watt, Bruce (2014). The Shire: A journey through time. Cronulla, Australia: Bruce Watt. pp. 11, 26, 27, 67. ISBN 978-064692019-1.
- Watt, Bruce (2019). Dharawal: the first contact people; 250 years of black and white relations. Cronulla, Australia: Bruce Watt. pp. vi, vii, 3, 5, 21, 43, 46, 50, 56, 87, 95, 111–114, 112, 121–122. ISBN 978-064699683-7.
- Williams, Shayne T. "An indigenous Australian perspective on Cook's arrival". BBC News.
