= Bermagui River =

River in New South Wales, Australia

Coordinates: 36°25′S 150°02′E

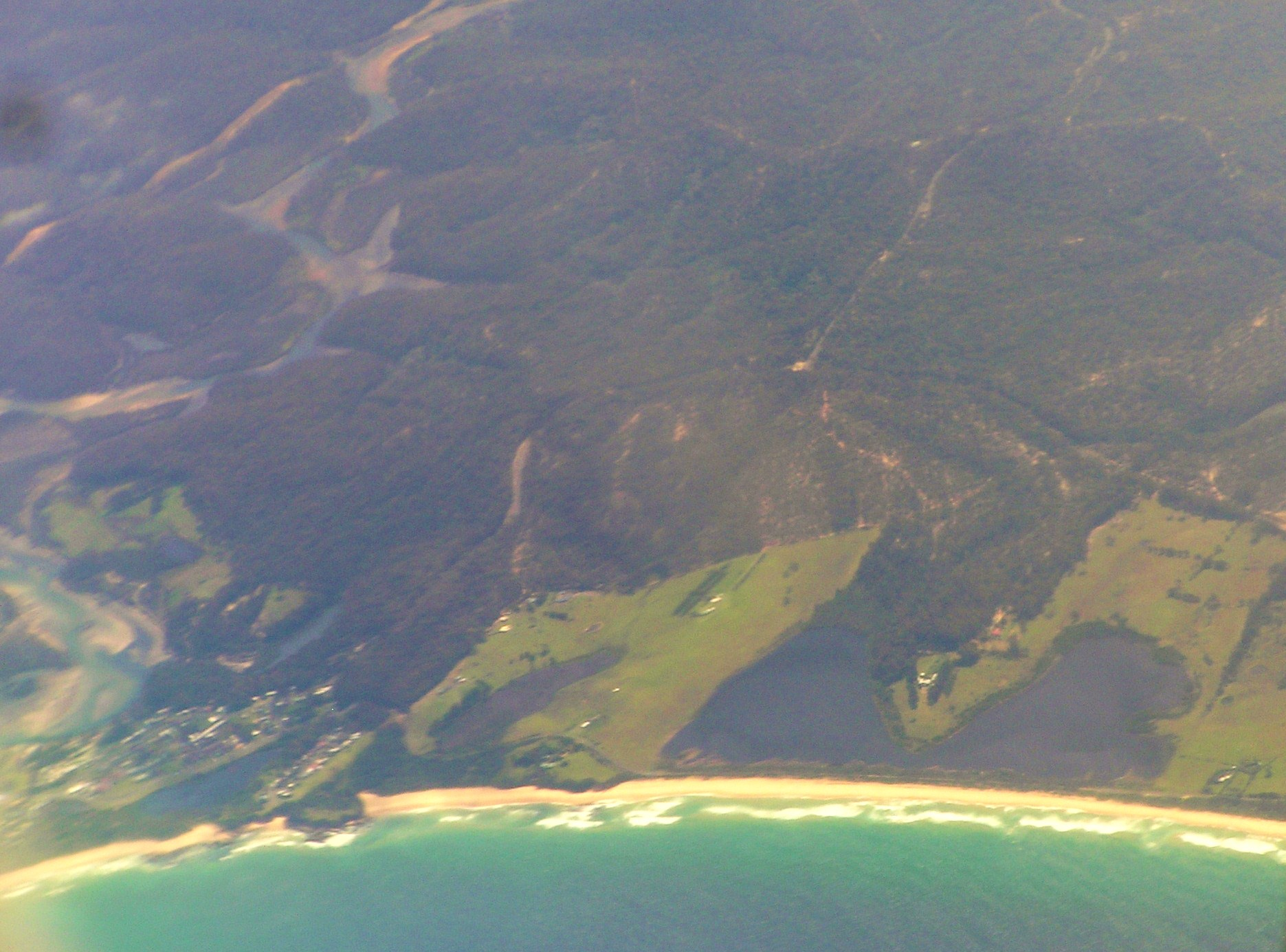
- An aerial view of the mouth of the Bermagui River, pictured bottom left, 2011.
- Etymology: Canoe with paddles
- Native name: permageua (Dyirringany); bermaguee (Dyirringany)

Location
- Country: Australia
- State: New South Wales
- Region: South East Corner (IBRA), South Coast
- Local government area: Bega Valley
- Town: Bermagui

Physical characteristics
- Source: Coolagolite Creek and Nutleys Creek
  - location: Bermagui South
  - elevation: 26 m (85 ft)
- Mouth: Tasman Sea, South Pacific Ocean
  - location: near Bermagui
- Length: 7 km (4.3 mi)
- Basin size: 296 km^{2} (114 sq mi)
- Depth
  - average: 1.1 m (3 ft 7 in)

Basin features
- Inland ports: Bermagui Fisherman’s Co-Op

Bermagui River is an open and trained semi-mature wave dominated barrier estuary or perennial river located in the South Coast region of New South Wales, Australia.

== Course and features ==
Formed by the confluence of the Coolagolite Creek and Nutleys Creek, near Bermagui South, the Bermagui River flows generally east, before reaching its mouth into the Tasman Sea of the South Pacific Ocean near Bermagui. The river descends 26 metres (85 ft) over its 7 kilometres (4.3 mi) course.

The catchment area of the river is 83 square kilometres (32 sq mi) with a volume of 2,160 megalitres (76×10^{6} cu ft) over a surface area of 2.2 square kilometres (0.85 sq mi), at an average depth of 1.1 metres (3 ft 7 in).

The name of the river is derived from the Aboriginal Dyirringanj word, spelled variously as permageua and bermaguee, meaning a canoe with paddles.

== See also ==
- Rivers of New South Wales
- List of rivers of New South Wales (A–K)
- List of rivers of Australia
