= Broger =

Indigenous Australian outlaw

Broger (c.1800 – 30 August 1830), sometimes spelled Brogher, was an Indigenous Australian outlaw of the Dharawal group of people from the Shoalhaven region of New South Wales. In 1829, he killed an English sawyer and after many months of avoiding capture and escaping custody, he was eventually hanged in 1830 for the crime of wilful murder.

== Early life ==
Broger was born around the year 1800 somewhere near what is now the town of Berry, New South Wales. As a child and adolescent, he witnessed the arrival and subsequent invasion of his people's land by British colonists. In 1822, Alexander Berry took possession of a large area of the Shoalhaven region which included Broger's birthplace. Berry named his newly acquired property as the Coolangatta Estate and brought with him hundreds of convict labourers. Many of these convicts were put to work as sawyers, cutting down the expansive groves of cedar for Berry who sold the timber for immense profit.

Some of the Dharawal people who resided at Berry's estate chose to adapt to the new order of things. Broger's brother, a man named Toodwik (or Broughton as he was called by the colonists), readily adjusted to the British ways and had become a valuable worker for not only Alexander Berry, but also other important colonists of the area such as Charles Throsby. Berry placed so much worth in Broughton that he made him an honorary constable for the Shoalhaven and considered him a friend.

Broger, however, avoided working for Berry and preferred a more traditional life with his wife and children in the forest away from the colonists.

== The killing of John Rivett ==
On 6 February 1829, Broger with his Aboriginal friend who went by the anglicised name of George Murphy, guided two sawyers, John Rivett and James Hicks, into the Kangaroo Valley to show them some cedar. Broger and Murphy were unhappy with Rivett as they believed he had seduced Murphy's wife and that he had cheated them in a trade a few days previously.

The details of what followed are unclear but, after what must have been a brief tussle, Broger killed Rivett. Broger later claimed that he acted in self defence and inferred that Rivett attacked him first. Regardless of this, after the killing, Broger and Murphy fled into the bush.

== Fugitives ==
Broger and his accomplice Murphy evaded the authorities through their knowledge of the densely forested and hilly region. Alexander Berry eventually called upon Broughton, who was a skilled tracker and "constable", to hunt down his brother. Broughton, however, did not fall in line with these wishes and Broger and Murphy remained at large.

In March 1829, the colonial authorities in Sydney publicly advertised a £10 reward for their capture. Broger and Murphy were then captured in May, but when taken on board a ship to be taken to Sydney, Broger stole the keys to his chains from a sleeping guard, and they jumped overboard and fled. After escaping, Broger and Murphy started to commit further "various depredations" in the region, and in June the authorities raised the bounty on the two outlaws to £20, including a ticket of leave if the person who captured them was convict.

== Capture and trial ==
The two outlaws were finally re-captured later that year and shipped to Sydney for trial. Murphy was shackled in heavy chains and detained at the police watch house next to Cockle Bay. Murphy managed to escape the watch house at night but as he was fleeing across Cockle Bay he got stuck in the mud. Weighed down by his chains, he was unable to extract himself from the mire, and was drowned by the incoming tide.

Broger, on the other hand, survived his lengthy pre-trial imprisonment and faced court at Campbelltown on 20 August 1830 before Chief Justice Francis Forbes. As Broger was Aboriginal, he was not allowed by law to speak in his own defence and his testimony was not admissible as evidence. He was found guilty of the wilful murder of John Rivett and sentenced to death.

== Execution, death and legacy ==
On 30 August 1830, Broger was publicly executed by hanging at Campbelltown. It is unknown where his body is buried.

The locality of Brogers Creek in his home country of the Shoalhaven region is named after him.

== See also ==
- List of Indigenous Australian historical figures
- Broughton
