= Baanbay =

Indigenous people of New South Wales

The Banbai are an Indigenous Australian people of New South Wales.

== Language ==
Baanbai, which R. H. Mathews had treated as a distinct language, appears on closer analysis, according to W. G. Hoddinott, to have been a dialect of Gumbaiŋgar. if not indeed almost identical to the language spoken by that tribe.

== Country ==
The Banbai were a Northern Tablelands tribe whose lands are estimated by Norman Tindale to have covered some 2,300 square miles (6,000 km^{2}), taking in Ben Lomond, Glencoe, Marowan, Mount Mitchell, and Kookabookra. They were also present along the Boyd River valley.

== People ==
The Banbai appear to be closely related, as an inland people, to the coastal Gumbaynggirr.

== Alternative names ==
- Ahnbi
- Bahnbi
- Dandi

Source: Tindale 1974, p. 191

== Some words ==
- bodyerra (boy)
- dillanggan (girl)
- ginggēr (kangaroo)
- wandyi (dog)

Source: Hoddinott 1967, p. 58

== Sources ==
- Hoddinott, W. G. (September 1967). "The BA:NBAI Language of Northern New South Wales". Oceania. 38 (1): 56–60. doi:10.1002/j.1834-4461.1967.tb00935.x. JSTOR 40329645.
- MacPherson, J. (1904). "Ngarrabul and other aboriginal tribes: distribution of tribes". Proceedings of the Linnean Society of New South Wales. 29: 677–684. doi:10.5962/bhl.part.20175.
- Mathews, R. H. (1903). "Languages of the New England aborigines". Proceedings of the American Philosophical Society. 42: 249–263.
- Radcliffe-Brown, A. R. (1918). "Notes on the social organization of Australian tribes". Journal of the Royal Anthropological Institute. 48: 222–253.
- Radcliffe-Brown, A. R. (April 1930). "The Social Organization of Australian Tribes". Oceania. 1 (1): 34–63. doi:10.1002/j.1834-4461.1930.tb00003.x. JSTOR 40373034.
- Radcliffe-Brown, A. R. (July 1930). "The Social Organization of Australian Tribes. Part II". Oceania. 1 (2): 206–246. doi:10.1002/j.1834-4461.1930.tb01645.x. JSTOR 40327321.
- Radcliffe-Brown, A. R. (October–December 1930). "The Social Organization of Australian Tribes Part II (Continued)". Oceania. 1 (3): 322–341. doi:10.1002/j.1834-4461.1930.tb01652.x. JSTOR 40327330.
- Radcliffe-Brown, A. R. (January–March 1931). "The Social Organization of Australian Tribes: Part III". Oceania. 1 (4): 426–456. doi:10.1002/j.1834-4461.1931.tb00015.x. JSTOR 40327343.
- Tindale, Norman Barnett (1974). "Banbai (NSW)". Aboriginal Tribes of Australia: Their Terrain, Environmental Controls, Distribution, Limits, and Proper Names. Australian National University.
