= Gumbaynggirr language =

Australian Aboriginal language

Gumbaynggirr
- Kumbainggar
- Native to: Australia
- Region: New South Wales
- Ethnicity: Gumbaynggirr, Banbai, ?Ngamba
- Native speakers: 310 (2021 census) (may include L2 speakers)
- Language family: Pama–Nyungan: Gumbaynggiric; Gumbaynggirr
- Dialects: Gumbaynggirr; Nymboidan; Gambalamam; Baanbay; ? Ngambaa

Language codes
- ISO 639-3: kgs
- Glottolog: kumb1268
- AIATSIS: E7
- ELP: Gumbaynggir
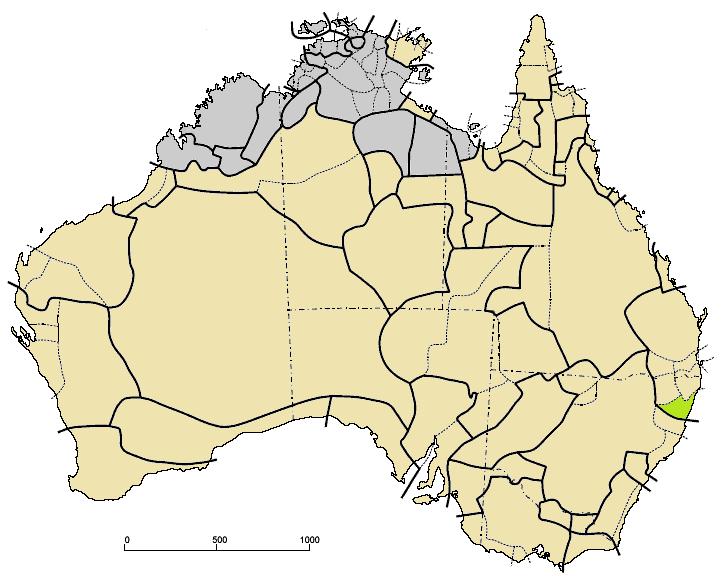

- Kumbainggar is classified as Critically Endangered by the UNESCO Atlas of the World's Languages in Danger.

Gumbaynggirr (also spelled Gumbaingari, Kumbainggar, Kumbaingeri, Gambalamam, and also called Baanbay) is an endangered Australian Aboriginal language spoken by the Gumbaynggirr people, who are native to the Mid North Coast of New South Wales.

== History and description ==
Gumbaynggirr is the only surviving language in the Gumbaynggiric family of the Pama–Nyungan stock.

== Revitalisation ==
Organised revitalisation of Gumbaynggirr has been under way since 1986 when Muurrbay Aboriginal Language and Culture Co-operative was founded at Nambucca Heads. Classes in Gumbaynggirr are taught through the North Coast Institute of TAFE up to Certificate II level.

Muurrbay and Many Rivers Aboriginal Language Centre (MRALC) supports Aboriginal language revitalization through activities that include:

- Providing access to linguistic expertise, and training for Aboriginal people.
- Recording languages wherever possible, and assisting with access to archival materials, providing a regional storage base for these materials.
- Producing language materials such as dictionaries or wordlists, grammars, learner's guides, transcriptions and translations.
- Providing community access to languages by using, and assisting communities to use information technology such as: Transcriber, Shoebox, Powerpoint and Adobe Audition.
- Employing linguists, Aboriginal language researchers and specialists in Information and Communication Technology.
- Raising awareness in the wider community about the value of Aboriginal languages.

In recent years, the Bularri Muurlay Nyanggan Aboriginal Corporation (BMNAC), established in 2010 by Gumbaynggirr and Bundjalung man Clark Webb, has made great efforts to revitalise the Gumbaynggirr language. The BMNAC started in 2010 when two after-school learning centres were set up at Wongala Estate Aboriginal Reserve and Woolgoolga High School. A third after-school Learning Centre was established at William Bayldon Primary School in Sawtell in 2012.

Further efforts from the BMNAC saw the Gumbaynggirrr Giingana Freedom School open in February 2022, the first independent Indigenous bilingual primary school to ever operate in New South Wales. The school caters to students from K–2, and operates under the ethos of "Bularri Muurlay Nyanggan" meaning 'Two Path Strong' in Gumbaynggirr language. Over 100 students have enrolled at the school since its opening, with 20 of them considered highly proficient in Gumbaynggirr.

=== Funding ===
Muurrbay Aboriginal Language and Culture Cooperative Ltd at Bellwood receives funding from the following government organisations:

- The Australian Government has an Indigenous Languages Support (ILS) program which gives money to community driven digital and multi-media resources as a tool for maintenance, revival and development of native languages
- New South Wales Department of Aboriginal Affairs has funded the Muurrbay Centre Sydney-based Aboriginal Languages Summer School

In November 2011, the Australian Government declared an Indigenous Protected Area for the Gumbaynggirr people. The Indigenous Protected Areas Act protects the native land of Indigenous Australians. The protection of the land ties into the spiritual beliefs of the Gumbaynggirr people and by protecting the land, the government is helping revitalise their culture.

== Phonology ==
=== Vowels ===
	Front	Central	Back
High	i iː		u uː
Low		a aː	

=== Consonants ===
	Labial	Alveolar	Retroflex	Palatal	Velar
Stop	b	d		ɟ	ɡ
Nasal	m	n		ɲ	ŋ
Lateral		l			
Trill/Tap		r	ɽ		
Approximant	w		ɻ	j	

Voiced stops may also be realised as voiceless [p, k, c, t], when occurring in intervocalic positions.

== Vocabulary ==
=== Numerals ===
It has a binary way of counting numbers.

=== Some words ===
- Giinagay 'hello'
- Yaam darruy ngiina gaduyaygu 'It's good to meet you'
- Yaarri yarraang 'goodbye'

== See also ==
- List of Aboriginal languages of New South Wales
