= Brogers Creek =

Locality in New South Wales, Australia

- Town
- Coordinates: 34°42′2″S 150°41′16″E
- Country: Australia
- State: New South Wales
- LGAs: Municipality of Kiama; City of Shoalhaven

Government
  - State electorate: Kiama
  - Federal division: Gilmore

Population
  - Total: 39 (2016 census)
- Postcode: 2535

Brogers Creek is a locality in the Illawarra region of New South Wales, Australia.

It is named after Broger, an Indigenous Australian outlaw.
