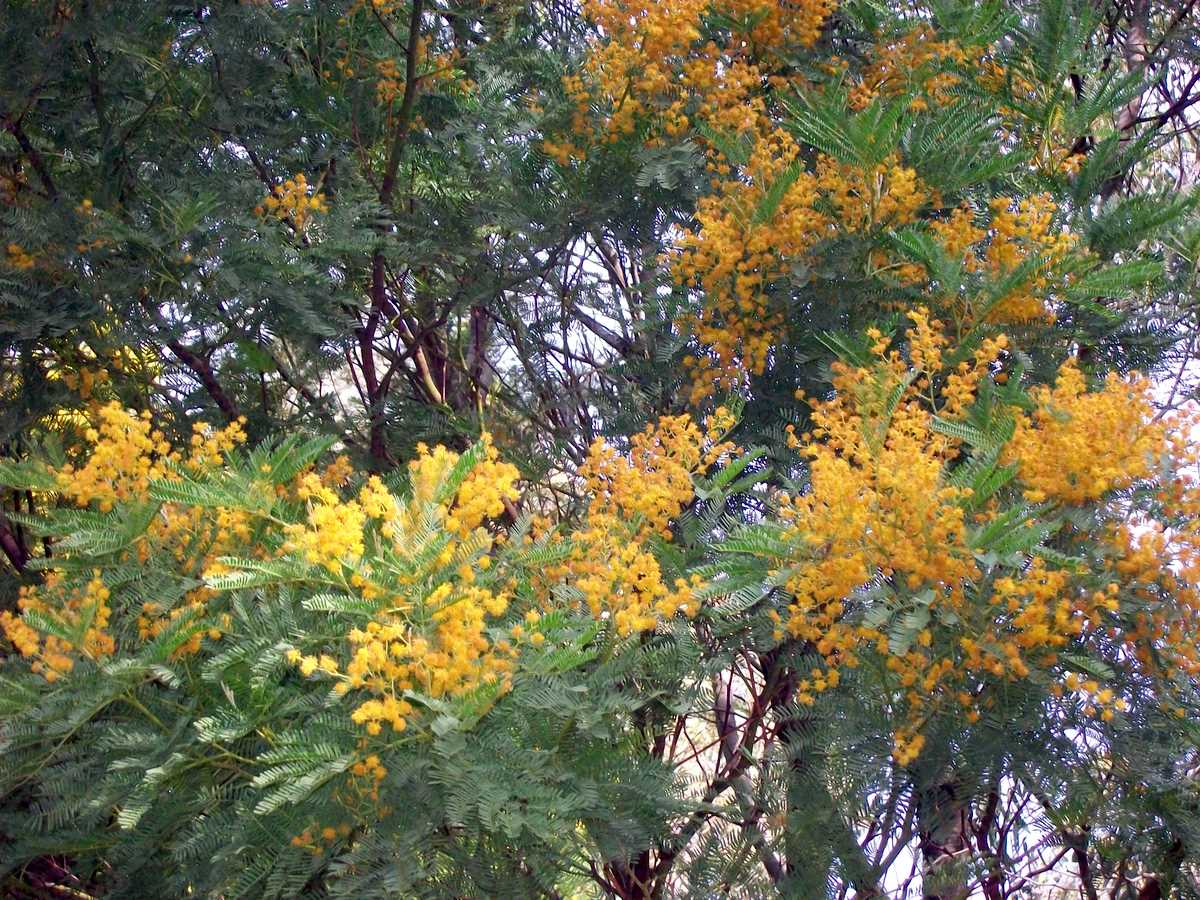

Conservation status
- Critically endangered (EPBC Act)

Scientific classification
- Kingdom: Plantae
- Clade: Tracheophytes
- Clade: Angiosperms
- Clade: Eudicots
- Clade: Rosids
- Order: Fabales
- Family: Fabaceae
- Subfamily: Caesalpinioideae
- Clade: Mimosoid clade
- Genus: Acacia
- Species: A. blayana

Binomial name
- Acacia blayana Tindale & Court
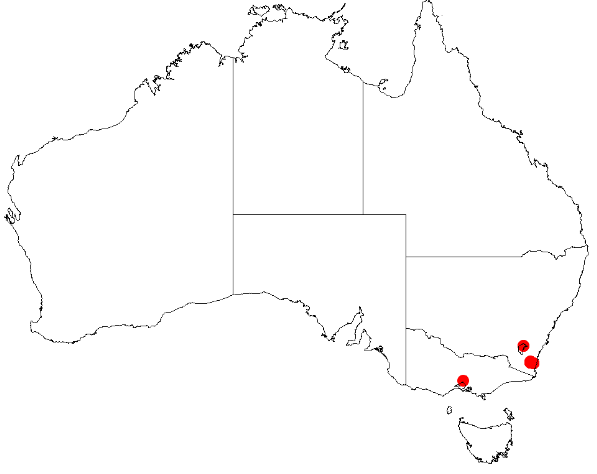
- Occurrence data from AVH

Synonyms
- Racosperma blayanum (Tindale & Court) Pedley

= Acacia blayana =

Blay's wattle

Species of legume

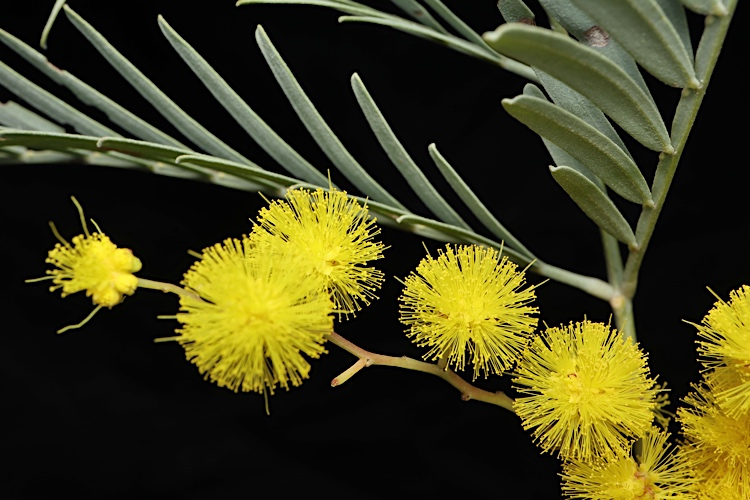
In the ANBG

Acacia blayana, commonly known as Blay's wattleor Brogo wattle, is a species of flowering plant in the family Fabaceae and is endemic to the south-east of New South Wales. It is a tree with dark grey bark, leathery, bipinnate leaves, bright yellow to golden-yellow flowers arranged in spherical heads, and straight or slightly curved leathery pods.

== Description ==
Acacia blayana is a tree that typically grows to a height of 25 m (82 ft) with a DBH of around 36 cm (14 in) and has smooth dark grey bark. The branchlets are terete, green, brown or purplish with a white powdery bloom. The leaves are bipinnate, and leathery, usually 13–45 mm (0.51–1.77 in) long on a rachis 10–60 mm (0.39–2.36 in) long with two to four pairs of pinnae (primary leaflets) 40–80 mm (1.6–3.1 in) long, each with 6 to 14 pairs of narrowly elliptic to very narrowly elliptic pinnules (secondary leaflets), 10–34 mm (0.39–1.34 in) long and mostly 2.5–4 mm (0.098–0.157 in) wide. The pinnules have white hairs pressed against the surface, a prominent vein closer to the upper edge, and more or less parallel minor veins.

The flowers are borne in axils or on the ends of branches in panicles of spherical heads on peduncles 3–5 mm (0.12–0.20 in) long, each head 5–9 mm (0.20–0.35 in) in diameter with 12 to 30 bright yellow to golden-yellow flowers. Flowering occurs in spring between September and October and the pods are straight or slightly curved, brown, bluish or purplish brown, 40–115 mm (1.6–4.5 in) long and 7–11 mm (0.28–0.43 in) wide and are fully developed between November and December.

== Taxonomy ==
Acacia blayana was first formally described in 1990 by the botanists Mary Tindale and Arthur Bertram Court in the journal Telopea, from specimens collected in the Brogo River catchment 22.5 km (14.0 mi) west of Cobargo by John Blay in 1982.

== Distribution and habitat ==
Blay's wattle is found only on the eastern side of the Great Dividing Range at Wadbilliga National Park in steep mountainous country in the south-east of New South Wales. The habitat is shallow rocky soils with relatively tall eucalyptus trees nearby. It occurs in pure stands and is sometimes associated with Acacia mearnsii or with species of Eucalyptus and Tristaniopsis laurina.

== Conservation status ==
Acacia blayana is listed as "critically endangered" under the Australian Government Environment Protection and Biodiversity Conservation Act 1999 and has a ROTAP rating of 2RC-.

== See also ==
- List of Acacia species
