= Aboriginal Languages Act 2017 =

Australian statute

Parliament of New South Wales
- Long title: An Act relating to Aboriginal languages.
- Citation: Aboriginal Languages Act 2017 (NSW)
- Territorial extent: New South Wales
- Enacted by: Legislative Council
- Enacted by: Legislative Assembly
- Assented to by: Governor David Hurley
- Assented to: 24 October 2017
- Commenced: 5 March 2020
- Administered by: Minister for Aboriginal Affairs and Treaty

Legislative history

Initiating chamber: Legislative Council
- Bill title: Aboriginal Languages Bill 2017
- Bill citation: Aboriginal Languages Bill 2017 (NSW)
- Introduced by: Sarah Mitchell
- First reading: 11 October 2017
- Second reading: 17 October 2017
- Third reading: 18 October 2017
- Passed: 18 October 2017

Revising chamber: Legislative Assembly
- Member(s) in charge: Rob Stokes
- First reading: 18 October 2017
- Second reading: 18 October 2017
- Third reading: 18 October 2017
- Passed: 18 October 2017

Final stages
- Finally passed both chambers: 18 October 2017
- Status: In force

The Aboriginal Languages Act 2017 is a New South Wales statute that is the first law in Australia to recognise the importance of the languages of the first nations people and the history of government decisions to suppress Aboriginal languages in New South Wales. The Act recognises that Aboriginal languages are part of the cultural heritage of New South Wales and Aboriginal people are the custodians of these languages and have the right to control and nurture them. The Act establishes a statutory body known as the Aboriginal Languages Trust.

== History ==
Prior to colonisation and settlement there were many languages spoken by the Aboriginal people living in what is now known as New South Wales. The first comprehensive investigation of Australian languages was conducted by William Dawes from 1788–1791.

In November 2016, the New South Wales Government announced that it would be pursuing legislation aimed at protecting Aboriginal languages. The Aboriginal Languages Bill 2017 was introduced into the NSW Legislative Council on 11 October 2017 with a traditional message stick ceremony.

The NSW Aboriginal Languages Act 2017 became law on 24 October 2017. This is the first law in Australia to protect traditional Aboriginal languages. The Act recognises that

"(a) The languages of the first peoples of the land comprising New South Wales are an integral part of the world’s oldest living culture and connect Aboriginal people to each other and to their land.

(b) As a result of past Government decisions Aboriginal languages were almost lost, but they were spoken in secret and passed on through Aboriginal families and communities.

(c) Aboriginal people will be reconnected with their culture and heritage by the reawakening, growing and nurturing of Aboriginal languages.

(d) Aboriginal languages are part of the cultural heritage of New South Wales.

(e) It is acknowledged that Aboriginal people are the custodians of Aboriginal languages and have the right to control their growth and nurturing."

=== Aboriginal Languages Trust ===
The Act states that the objective of the Aboriginal Languages Trust is to "provide a focused, coordinated and sustained effort in relation to Aboriginal language activities at local, regional and State levels". The Trust operates as a not-for-profit New South Wales government agency. The Trust will prepare a strategic plan to work with Aboriginal communities to help preserve and reawaken languages in New South Wales.

== See also ==
- Australian Aboriginal languages
