= Darkinyung people =

Indigenous Australian people of the Hawkesbury and Hunter Ranges

The Darkinyung are an indigenous Australian people of New South Wales.

== Country ==
According to R. H. Mathews, the Darkinyung's territory encompassed the lands to the south of the Hunter River, from Jerry's Plains towards Maitland, extending as far to the south as Wollombi Brook, Putty Creek, inclusive of the Macdonald, Colo, and Hawkesbury rivers.

Mathews description of the Darkinyung territory is in conflict with the claims of the Darkinjung Local Aboriginal Land Council that the Central Coast NSW Region was Darkinyung land.

== History of contact with white settlers ==
In 1789, Governor Arthur Phillip conducted a boat expedition upstream to the branches of the Hawkesbury River, encountering the local inhabitants. He returned overland in 1791; members of his party who were natives of the Cumberland Plain confirmed that the people there were of a distinct group that spoke a different language. Phillip wrote: "Two of those natives who have lived amongst us for some time were with us, which was from them that we understood, our new friends had a language different from theirs." The British referred to these inhabitants of the upper Hawkesbury, Richmond Hill, Kurrajong and Springwood as "The Branch natives".

Ford writes that, after settlement of the upper Hawkesbury, "'The Branch' natives were pacified in 1805 by a massacre led by Andrew Thompson towards Springwood."

In 1824, John Blaxland, Jnr, learned that the mountain people south of the Hunter River referred to their land as Wallambine. Later, Surveyor-General Thomas Mitchell instructed that a new town in the region be named Wollombi. The term "Wollombi Tribe" came to be used for that group.

By the last years of the 19th century, only a remnant, mostly half-castes, of 60 Darkinyung had survived, concentrated on a government reserve set aside for aborigines on the Hawkesbury river, 12 miles (19 km) from Windsor. Of these, only two very old men had been initiated, Hoe Gooburra and Charley Clark. It was thanks to these elderly informants that much of what is known of Darkinung traditional ways was able to be recorded by Mathews.

== Bora ceremony ==
The Bora Ceremony of the Darkinyung people is described in considerable detail in Matthews submission to the Royal Society of Victoria titles "The Burbung of the Darkinung Tribes".

== Name ==
The name has been variously spelled Darkinyung (AIATSIS), Darkinjung (Tindale), Darkiñung (Ford), Darkinung, Darkin-yûng, Darkinyoong, Darkinjang, etc.

== Sources ==
- Ford, Geoffrey Eric (2010). Darkiñung Recognition: An analysis of the historiography for the aborigines from the Hawkesbury-Hunter Ranges to the northwest of Sydney (M.A. thesis). University of Sydney. Ford also provides at the same page a selection of abstracts and précis on particular topics, including Ford 2011, Ford 2012, Ford 2013.
- Ford, Geoffrey Eric (2011). "Darkiñung Borders: extracted from 'Darkiñung Recognition' 2010 thesis" (PDF). University of Sydney.
- Ford, Geoffrey Eric (2012). "Darkiñung Brief: extracted from 'Darkiñung Recognition' 2010 thesis" (PDF). University of Sydney. 5pp.
- Ford, Geoffrey Eric (2013). "Darkiñung Abstract: The Original People of the Hawkesbury / Blue Mountains – The Aboriginal Identification from Colonial History" (PDF). University of Sydney.
- Mathews, Robert Hamilton (1897). "The Burbung of the Darkinung Tribes" (PDF). Proceedings of the Royal Society of Victoria. 10 (1): 1–12.
