= Dhawa, Rajasthan =

Dhawa
- Location in Rajasthan, India Dhawa (India)
- Coordinates: 26.2389519°N 73.0243044°E
- Country: India
- State: Rajasthan
- District: Jodhpur district

Government
  - Member of Parliament: Gajendra Singh Shekhawat ( 2014- Present )
  - Member of the Legislative Assembly (India): Mahendra Bishnoi

Area
  - Total: 28.53 km^{2} (11.02 sq mi)

Population
  - Total: 4,988
  - Density: 174.8/km^{2} (452.8/sq mi)

Languages
  - Official: Hindi and Rajasthani
- Time zone: UTC+5:30 (IST)
- PIN: 342014
- Telephone code: 02931
- Vehicle registration: RJ 19

Dhawa is the gram Panchayat & Panchayat samiti and Dhawa is a town in Luni tehsil in Jodhpur district of the Indian state of Rajasthan. It is located 42 km South from Jodhpur district headquarters.22 km from Luni. 374 km from State capital Jaipur.

== Overview ==
Dhawa is a village a located on Jodhpur-Barmer highway. The population of dhawa is about 7000. A government senior secondary school is located in dhawa, but no science subject is available. A government hospital is located in dhawa. a vetenary hospital also in dhawa.a private hospital location uco bank ka pas dhawa[ram hospital]

== Demographic ==
Hindi and Rajasthani is the Local Language.

== City ==
Dhawa has a big market, where every type of shop is available. There are four petrol pumps.

== Hotels ==
Dhawa is famous for "Dal ke Pakode". Jain Hotel is famous and Magravati resort is 3-star hotel on NH 25.

=== By Rail ===
There is no railway station near to Dhawa in less than 10 km. However Jodhpur Jn Rail Way Station is a major railway station 41 km from Dhawa.

Nearest railway station is dhundhara junction.

== Villages in Dhawa Gram Panchayat ==
Chali	Dhabecho Ka Gaon
Dhawa I	Dhawa Ii
Melwa	Modathali
Piprali	Rabariyawas
Rajeshwar Nagar
