= John Blay =

Australian writer

John Charles Blay, born on 5 October 1944, is an Australian writer and naturalist who has written extensively about the Australian bush and its people in drama, prose and poetry. His work unveiling local landscape has had many consequences including, in 1982, discovering a new species of wattle, Acacia blayana, named in his honour.

== Personal life ==
Blay was born in Parramatta, NSW, Australia and lived in the inner city of Sydney until 1970 when he moved to a spotted gum forest at Bermagui, on the far south coast of NSW, a move detailed in his memoir, Part of the Scenery. In following years his immersion in the wild forests and understanding of their wildlife led to him receiving the inaugural Parks Writer Award to spend 12 months alone in wilderness areas of the region. This period extended over the years along with his understanding of the south-eastern region. He is also interested in using native plants in sustainable gardening, as in The Australian Native Plant Gardener's Almanac.

Since 2001, he has researched the Bundian Way, an ancient Aboriginal pathway, in association with local Aboriginal communities and as the Bundian Way Project Officer for Eden Local Aboriginal Land Council. His researches and bushwalks while investigating this traditional route resulted in its official recognition and NSW Heritage listing in 2012. He is an acknowledged authority on the landscapes and history of south-eastern Australia. His understanding "of the varying country" of the shared history Heritage pathway between the highest part of the Australian continent and the coast is demonstrated in his book, On Track: Searching out the Bundian Way.

== Style ==
Blay's prose focuses on place, bringing together human and physical landscape with historical influences.

Blay's work reflects not only his expertise across literary forms but also his understanding of the human experience. His writings about his bushwalking experience include a spiritual odyssey, and uncover significant history associated with the track, as well as describing the difficulties of long-distance walking. The third part of the trilogy, Wild Nature, was published in August 2020 by NewSouth. It is at once a natural history of the region and an examination of the values of its national parks and their role in sustaining nature.

His work has also extended to sound sculpture. The sculptural installation, Les St Hill and the Tin Canoe that included his oral history of a WW1 veteran recorded at Bermagui in 1975, won the $10,000 major prize at the Lake Light Sculpture Jindabyne in Easter 2018. The judges said: "It was a unanimous decision by the judges, as it extended the definition of what sculpture can be and might be. We loved its animation of space, the way it captured interest and invited pause, and loved the way it connected with the Snowy Mountains and the whole idea of storytelling and oral histories. "It is a piece that could sit anywhere in the world, very professional and well resolved work, and a fabulous piece of public art – with a beautiful use of sound, and a beautiful use of the solar energy around to push that forward. We did not expect to see this here." The sculpture is on exhibition by the river in Delegate, NSW.

== Selected works ==
=== Prose ===
- Part of the Scenery, McPhee Gribble/Penguin Books Australia, Fitzroy Victoria, 1984, ISBN 0 14 007642 5
- Trek Through the Back Country, Methuen Australia, North Ryde NSW, 1987, ISBN 0 454 01236 5
- On Track Searching out the Bundian Way, New South, Sydney, August 2015, ISBN 9781742234441
- Back Country Trek through the Deua and Wadbilliga, Canopy Press, Eden, NSW, 2016, ISBN 9780995418608
- Wild Nature: walking Australia's south east forests, NewSouth, Sydney, August 2020, ISBN 9781742236902

=== Drama ===
- 1972 Vinegar Hill, (verse play) Australian Broadcasting Commission (ABC) Radio
- 1972 Mayakovsky ABC Radio
- 1974 The Journeys of Audrey D ABC Radio
- 1974 Harpur ABC Radio,
- 1975 Doin' our Best to Deny It ABC Radio
- 1976 The Great Village Dream ABC Radio
- 1981 Bedbug Celebration, The Pram Factory, Melbourne, Victoria
- 1987 Variations on a Theme of the Lyrebird ABC Radio
- 1987 The Jazz Singer ABC Radio
- 1988 The Fleet ABC Radio

=== Poetry ===
Blay's poetry has been published in a variety of anthologies, newspapers and magazines, including:

- Australian Poetry Now Ed. Thomas W Shapcott, Sun Books, Melbourne, 1970, pp. 156–163 ISBN 0 72510106 7
- Australians Aware, Poems and paintings of today elected by Rodney Hall, Ure Smith, Sydney, 1975, p. 54
- The Gift of the Forest, Ed. Jutta Hosel, Rosemary and Robert Brissenden, Australian Conservation Foundation,1982, Currey O'Neill, South Yarra, Victoria, ISBN 0859020495
- The Night of the Gardens, printed in The Sydney Morning Herald, 1994-07-02, Spectrum p. 9A
- The Australian Wildlife Diary, John Blay, Wildlife Presentations, Sydney, 1995 ISBN 0 85881 144 8

=== Essays ===
- Seeing the Forest and the Trees, The Australian Literary Review, February 2008 (vol.3 no.1)
- Truth and Terror in Fire's Ancient Kingdom, The Australian Literary Review, April 2009 (vol.4 no.3)
- Ours is a Land Shaped by Licking Flames, The Canberra Times, 2012-03-24,
- The Bundian Way: mapping with stories Science and Stewardship to protect and sustain wilderness values: Tenth World Wilderness Congress symposium, Salamanca, Spain, 2013
- Moving Forwards, ICOMOS Conference 2013, Historic Environment 2014 (Vol26 No.1-2014)
- AWAY on the Bundian Way (with Blackburn and Dorrough) in Marshall A.J. (ed.) Land of Sweeping Plains, CSIRO Publishing, 2014 ISBN 9781486300815

=== Other ===
- The Australian Native Plant Gardener's Almanac Wildlife Presentations, Sydney, 1994 ISBN 0 646 18124-6
- The Australian Native Plant Gardener's Almanac (2nd Edition), Wildlife Presentations, Sydney, 1995 ISBN 0 646 26461 3 & 0 646 26461 1
- Articles and reviews published in a range of newspapers and magazines including Australian Geographic, The Canberra Times and The Sydney Morning Herald

== Awards ==
- Farmers Poetry Prize, 1969
- Young Writers Fellowship, 1972
- Literature Board of Australia Grant, 1974
- Parks Writers Award, NSW National Wildlife Service and Literature Board of Australia,1981*
- Major Prize, Lake Light Sculpture, Jindabyne, 2018,
