= Wodiwodi =

Group of Indigenous Australians

The Wodiwodi or Wodi Wodi, also pronounced Whardi Whardi, are a sub-group of the Dharawal people, an Indigenous Australian people of the east coast of the continent.

== Language ==
The Wodiwodi language, considered to be a dialect of Dharawal, was partially described by William Ridley in 1875, who obtained his information from John Malone who had obtained information from his wife, Lizzie Malone, whose mother was a Shoalhaven Indigenous person.

== Country ==
The Wodiwodi are estimated, by Norman Tindale, to have lived over some 2600 square kilometres (1000 square miles) of country of the Illawarra north of the Shoalhaven River including Lake Illawarra, Berkeley and Hooka Creek. The area underwent significant change with sea level rise 18,000 to 7,500 years ago which completely displaced inhabitants of previous coastal areas and resulted in dramatic changes in distributions of peoples. The Wodiwodi descendants are considered one of the custodians of the land in this area. The Wodi Wodi track at Stanwell Park, New South Wales, now a walking track, was used by the Wodiwodi people before becoming an early cart track through the Illawarra Escarpment into the Illawarra.

== Mythology ==
The Wodiwodi word for the creator figure called Baiame by contiguous tribes, was Mirrirul, from the word mirīr, meaning "sky."

== Alternative spellings and names ==
- Wodi Wodi
- Woddi Woddi
- Whardi Whardi
- Illawarra (a regional name)

== Some words ==
- būnbāri (boy)
- būrrū (kangaroo)
- jiruŋgaluŋ (white man)
- kudjaguz (child)
- mirriguŋ (dog)

== Citations ==
=== Sources ===
- "Aboriginal Communities". Wollongong City Council.
- Brown, M. A.; Brown, G. W. (21 September 1899). "Aboriginal words and meanings". Science of Man. 2 (4): 141–142.
- Malone, John (1878). Ridley, William (ed.). "Australian Languages and Traditions". Journal of the Anthropological Institute of Great Britain and Ireland. 7: 232–274, 263–265. doi:10.2307/2841001. JSTOR 2841001.
- Mathews, R. H. (1898). "Initiation ceremonies of Australian tribes.Appendix Nguttan initiation ceremony". Proceedings of the American Philosophical Society. 37: 54–73.
- Organ, Michael K.; Speechley, Carol (1997). "Illawarra Aborigines - An Introductory History". In Hagan, J. S.; Wells, A. (eds.). A History of Wollongong. University of Wollongong Press. pp. 7–22.
- Ridley, William (1875). Kámilarói, and other Australian languages (PDF). Sydney: T. Richards, government printer.
- Tindale, Norman Barnett (1974). "Wodiwodi (NSW)". Aboriginal Tribes of Australia: Their Terrain, Environmental Controls, Distribution, Limits, and Proper Names. Australian National University Press. ISBN 978-0-708-10741-6.
- "Wodi Wodi Walking Track - Stanwell Park Attraction". VisitNSW.com.
