= Dharawal language =

Endangered Yuin language in Australia

Dharawal
- Tharawal
- Native to: Australia
- Region: New South Wales
- Ethnicity: Dharawal, Wodiwodi, Gweagal
- Native speakers: 103 self-identified speakers (2021 census)
- Language family: Pama–Nyungan: Yuin–Kuric; Yuin; Tharawal languages; Dharawal

Language codes
- ISO 639-3: tbh
- Glottolog: thur1254
- AIATSIS: S59
- ELP: Dharawal
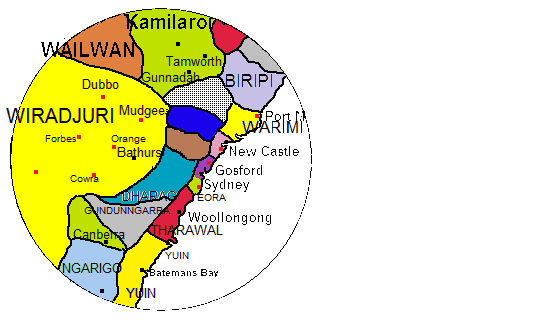
- Traditional lands of Australian Aboriginal tribes around Sydney, New South Wales; (Note: This map is indicative only.) Dharawal in red

- Dharawal is classified as Critically Endangered by the UNESCO Atlas of the World's Languages in Danger.

The Dharawal language, also spelt Tharawal and Thurawal, and also known as Wodiwodi and other variants, is an Australian Aboriginal language of New South Wales.

People of the neighbouring Gandangara clans make mention of the Dharawal language as actually being called Gur Gur.

== Phonology ==
=== Consonants ===
	Labial	Velar	Alveolar	Dental	Palatal
Stop	b	g	d	d̪	ɟ
Nasal	m	ŋ	n	n̪	ɲ
Lateral			l		
Rhotic			r		
Approximant	w				j

=== Vowels ===
Vowels are phonemically /a i u/.

== Vocabulary ==
Below is a basic vocabulary list from Blake (1981).

English	Dharawal
man	yuwiny
woman	miga
mother	minga
father	baba
head	walaar
eye	mabura
nose	nugur
ear	guri
mouth	gami
tongue	ḏalany
tooth	yira
hand	maramal
breast	nguminyang
stomach	biṉḏi
faeces	guning
thigh	ḏara
foot	ḏana
blood	ngawu
dog	mirigang
snake	gari
kangaroo	buru
possum	guruura
fish	ḏany
spider	maraara
crow	wawarnang
sun	wuri
moon	dyadyung
stone	garabang
water	ngadyung
camp	ngura
fire	ganbi
smoke	gaandi
food	ḏangang
meat	mandidyang
stand	ḏar
see	nand
go	yand
get	mand
hit, kill	bulm
I	ngayagang
you	nyindigang
one	miḏang
two	bula

== See also ==
- Dharawal
- Wodiwodi
