= Dhaoa =

Dhawa
- Location in Bangladesh
- Coordinates: 22°27′N 90°3′E
- Country: Bangladesh
- Division: Barisal Division
- District: Pirojpur District
- Time zone: UTC+6 (Bangladesh Time)

Dhaoa is a village in Pirojpur District in the Barisal Division of southwestern Bangladesh.
