= Dhurga language =

Pama–Nyungan language of Australia

Dhurga
- Thurga
- Native to: Australia
- Region: New South Wales, and Jervis Bay Territory
- Ethnicity: Dhurga (Yuin), Wandandian, ?Walbunja, Murramarang
- Extinct: 1970s
- Revival: 2010s
- Language family: Pama–Nyungan: Yuin–Kuric; Yuin; Tharawal; Dhurga
- Dialects: Tharumba

Language codes
- ISO 639-3: dhu
- Glottolog: dhur1239
- AIATSIS: S53, S54, S55, S56
- ELP: Dhurga
- Dhurga is classified as Critically Endangered by the UNESCO Atlas of the World's Languages in Danger.

The Dhurga language, also written Thurga, is an Australian Aboriginal language of New South Wales. It is a language of the Yuin people, specifically the Wandandian and Walbunja groups, but there have been no fluent speakers officially recorded for decades, so it has been functionally extinct for some time. Efforts have been made to revive the language since the 2010s.

== Status and revival ==
No speakers of the language have been officially recorded since before 1975.

In 2015 local Yuin people collaborated with the Tathra Public School in Tathra to create a new app as a teaching aid for both Dhurga and the Thaua language, using old audio recordings of elders as well as documentation created by early explorers and settlers in the region. One of the major contributors to the project, Graham Moore, has also written an Aboriginal language book.

Staff of Vincentia High School, led by Gary Worthy, have carried out research into Aboriginal languages and run community workshops since 2004, and a dedicated languages team teaches the Dhurga language.

Bermagui Public School, a primary school in Bermagui, has taught local Aboriginal languages including Dhurga and the Djiringanj language, along with the associated cultures, since 2019.

In 2020 The Dhurga Dictionary and Learners Grammar: A South-East Coast NSW Aboriginal Language was published.

== Geographical distribution ==
It was spoken in the Nowra-Jervis Bay area southwards to Narooma, and possibly as far south as Wallaga Lake. Dharumba and Walbanga/Walbjunja may have been dialects.

== Phonology ==
The language is tonal.
