= Dharug language =

Australian Aboriginal language of the Sydney area

Dharug
- Sydney, Iyora, Gadigal, Darug, Dharuk, Biyal Biyal
- Native to: Australia
- Region: New South Wales
- Ethnicity: Dharug, Eora (Yura) (Gadigal, Wangal, Cammeraygal, Wallumettagal, Bidjigal)
- Extinct: late 19th–early 20th century
- Revival: Small number of L2 speakers
- Language family: Pama–Nyungan: Yuin–Kuric; Yora; Dharug
- Dialects: Dharuk; Gamaraygal; Iora

Language codes
- ISO 639-3: xdk
- Glottolog: sydn1236
- AIATSIS: S64
- ELP: Dharug
- Dharug is classified as Critically Endangered by the UNESCO Atlas of the World's Languages in Danger.

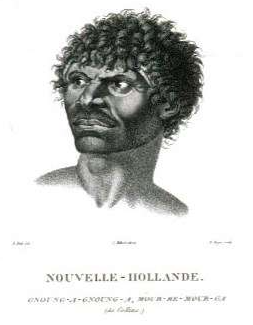
Portrait of an Eora man Gnunga Gnunga Murremurgan

The Dharug language, also spelt Darug, Dharruk, and other variants, and also known as the Sydney language, Gadigal language (Sydney city area), is an Australian Aboriginal language of the Yuin–Kuric group that was traditionally spoken in the region of Sydney, New South Wales, until it became extinct due to the effects of colonisation. It is the traditional language of the Dharug people. The Dharug population declined sharply following colonisation.

The term Eora language has sometimes been used to distinguish a coastal dialect from hinterland dialects, but there is no evidence that Aboriginal peoples ever used this term, which simply means 'people'. Efforts have been made to revive a reconstructed form of the language.

== Name ==
The speakers did not use a specific name for their language prior to settlement by the First Fleet. The coastal dialect has been referred to as Iyora (also spelt as Iora or Eora), which simply means 'people' (or Aboriginal people), while the inland dialect has been referred to as Dharug, a term of unknown origin or meaning. Linguist and anthropologist Jakelin Troy (2019) describes two dialects of the Sydney language, with neither Dharug (S64) nor Eora appearing in the historical record as language names.

Language scholar Jeremy Steele and historian Keith Vincent Smith have postulated the name "Biyal Biyal" for the language, based on evidence that this term, or one similar to it, was in use.

A website devoted to Dharug and Dharawal resources says "The word Daruk was assigned to the Iyura (Eora) people as a language group, or more commonly referred to as the people that sustained their diet by the constant digging of the yams as a vegetable supplement. The Dark, Darug, Tarook, Taruk Tarug is related to the word Midyini, meaning yam".

== Geographical distribution ==
The traditional territory of the coastal variety ("Iyora/Eyora", or Kuringgai) was estimated by Val Attenbrow (2002) to include "...the Sydney Peninsula (north of Botany Bay, south of Port Jackson, west to Parramatta), as well as the country to the north of Port Jackson, possibly as far as Broken Bay".

Attenbrow places the "hinterland dialect" (Dharug) "...on the Cumberland Plain from Appin in the south to the Hawkesbury River in the north; west of the Georges River, Parramatta, the Lane Cove River and Berowra Creek". R. H. Mathews (1903) said that the territory extended "...along the coast to the Hawkesbury River, and inland to what are now the towns of Windsor, Penrith, Campbelltown".

== History ==
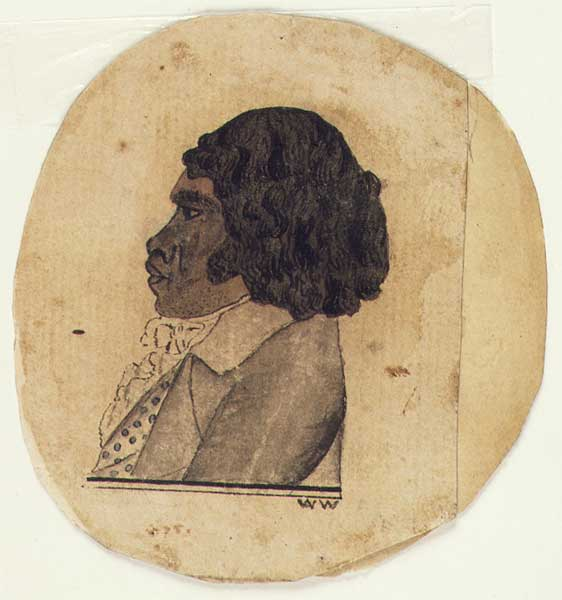
Portrait of Bennelong, a senior Wangal man of the Eora peoples

=== Eora people ===
The word Eora has been used as an ethnonym by non-Aboriginal people since the late 19th century, and by Aboriginal people since the late 20th century, to describe Aboriginal peoples of the Sydney region, despite there being "no evidence that Aboriginal people had used it in 1788 as the name of a language or group of people inhabiting the Sydney peninsula".

Approximately 70 per cent of the Eora people died during the nineteenth century as a result of the genocidal policies of colonial Australia, smallpox and other introduced diseases, and the destruction of their natural food sources.

=== Earliest habitation ===
Radiocarbon dating suggests human activity occurred in and around Sydney for at least 30,000 years, in the Upper Paleolithic period. However, numerous Aboriginal stone tools found in Sydney's far western suburbs gravel sediments were dated to 45,000–50,000 years BP, suggesting humans may have been present in the region earlier than the radiocarbon dates indicate.

=== First European records ===
Dharug people recognise William Dawes of the First Fleet, serving aboard the flagship Sirius, as the first to record the Dharug language; his principal informant was an Aboriginal woman named Patyegarang. Dawes was returned to England in December 1791, after disagreements with Governor Phillip on, among other things, the punitive expedition launched following the wounding of the Government gamekeeper, allegedly by Pemulwuy, a Yora man.

=== Extinction ===
The indigenous population of Sydney gradually shifted to English in everyday life, as well as New South Wales Pidgin. Combined with social upheaval, this led to the Dharug language falling out of use in the late nineteenth and early twentieth century. A wordlist of the local Sydney language was published by William Ridley in 1875, and he noted that, at that time, very few fluent speakers were left. Mathews published brief grammatical notes and a vocabulary in 1901, which he reported were "compiled by me from old natives acquanted with the language".

== Revival ==
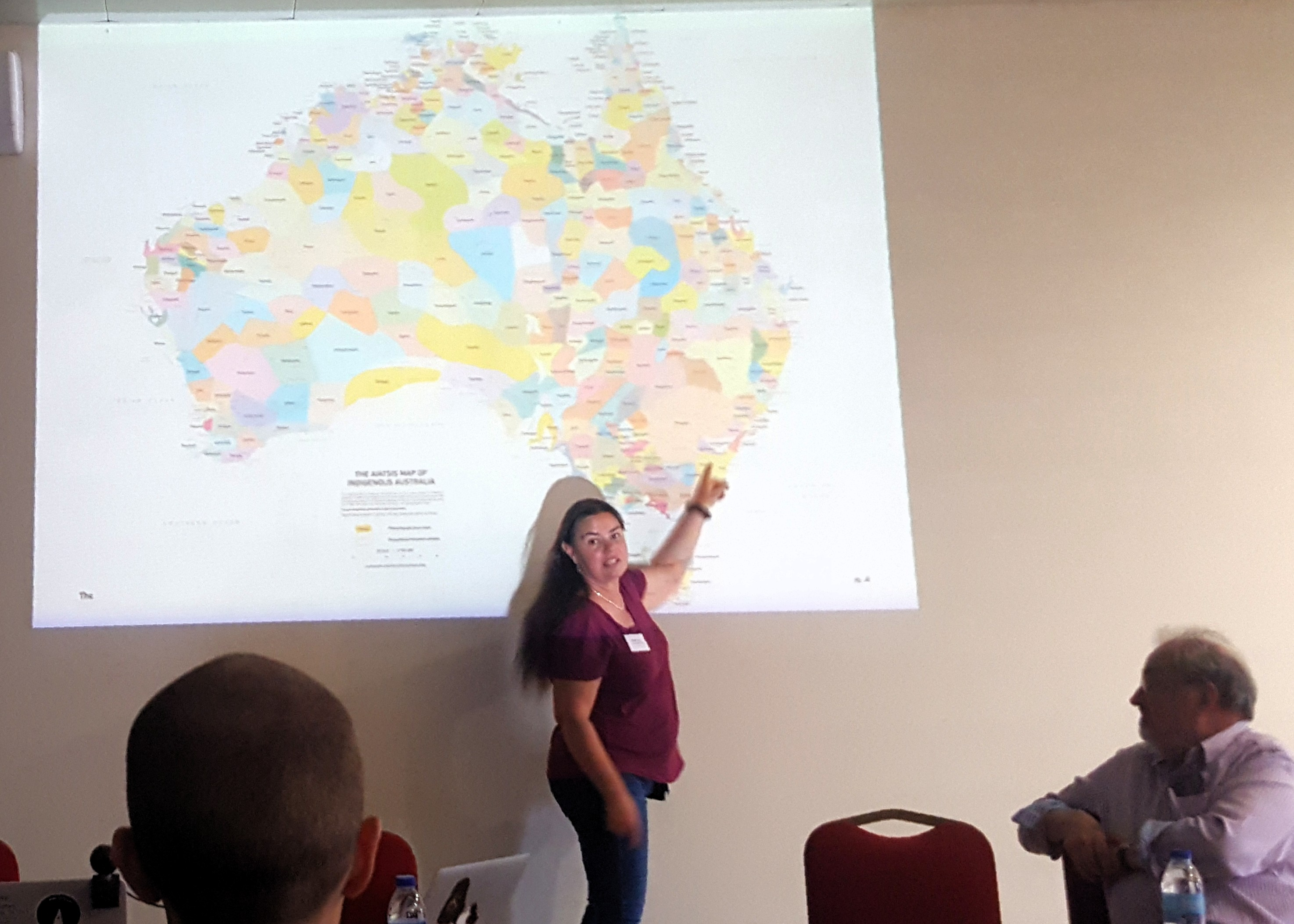
Jakelin Troy at the CinC2017 congress in Portugal

The Dharug language became extinct, primarily as a result of colonisation. Some Dharug people had retained vocabulary, but little grammar or phonology survived. For many years, non-Aboriginal researchers collected records of Aboriginal languages for preservation purposes. From the 1990s, Aboriginal people became increasingly involved in this process, including developing tools to support language reclamation. During the 1990s and 2000s, some descendants of the Dharug clans in Western Sydney made considerable efforts to revive Dharug as a spoken language. In the 21st century, some Dharug speakers have delivered speeches in a reconstructed form of the language, and younger community members visit schools to give demonstrations of spoken Dharug.

In 2005, a Macquarie University master's thesis by Jeremy Steele, "The Aboriginal Language of Sydney", provided an analysis of the grammar in a partial reconstruction of the language. The notebooks of William Dawes were the main source, together with word lists compiled by First Fleeters David Collins, John Hunter, Philip Gidley King (in Hunter), Daniel Southwell, Watkin Tench, David Blackburn, a notebook called "Anon" (or "Notebook c"), Henry Fulton, and later contributors such as Daniel Paine, James Bowman, and others. The Dawes notebooks were particularly useful in establishing how verbs operated: past and future tenses were indicated by suffixes or endings, often with further pronoun suffixes indicating who (I, you, they, etc.) performed the action.

A recreated version of the language is spoken at welcome ceremonies conducted by the Dharug people.

As of 2005, some children at Chifley College's Dunheved campus in Sydney had started learning the reconstructed Dharug language, and parts of the language have been taught at the Sydney Festival.

In December 2020, Olivia Fox sang a version of Australia's national anthem in Dharug at the Tri Nations Test match between Australia and Argentina.

== Phonology ==
=== Consonants ===
	Peripheral		Laminal		Apical	
	Bilabial	Velar	Palatal	Dental	Alveolar	Retroflex
Stop	b	k	c	t̪	t	
Nasal	m	ŋ	ɲ	n̪	n	
Lateral			ʎ		l	
Rhotic					r	ɻ
Semivowel	w		j			

=== Vowels ===
	Front	Back
High	i	u
Low	a	

The language may have had a distinction of vowel length, but this is difficult to determine from the extant data.

== Vocabulary ==
The suffix identifier -gal and -galyan refer to -man of and -woman of.

Clan names such as Burramuttagal (identifying the people) therefore translate to man of Burramutta — also known as Parramatta (identifying the place those specific people are from); Gadigal (identifying the people), man of Gadi — Sydney within Gadigal Country (identifying the place those specific people are from); and Kamaygalyan (identifying the people), woman of Kamay — Botany Bay (identifying the place those specific people are from). This people-and-place naming convention is found across all the clans of the Eora Nation.

Another example of the connection between people and place (without the suffix) is the nation name Eora itself, which translates as 'people' and 'from here' or 'this place'. The name Eora is used collectively for the people of the Sydney region and the region they inhabit.

Some sample words in the Dharug language are:

Dharug word	Approximate pronunciation	Meaning
yura / eora	ee-o-ra	people, men (specifically Aboriginal people)
mula	mul-la	man (specifically Aboriginal man)
dyin	dee-yin	woman (specifically Aboriginal woman) (dyin is also the word for a wife)
ngaya	ng-ga-ya	I, me
ngyini	ng-gee-nee	you
biyanga	bee-yang-a	father
wiyanga	wee-yang-a	mother
durung	doo-roong	son
durunanang	doo-roon-e-nang	daughter
nura / ngurra	nu-ra	place, land, country
burra	boo-ra	the sky (burra is also the word for eels)
guwing	ku-in	the sun
yanada	yan-na-dah	the moon
birrung / birrong	bir-roong	stars
yuin	yoo-win	yes
biyal	bee-yal	no
budyari	bood-yee-re	good, well, right, pretty, handsome
marri	mur-re	great
wiri	wee-re	bad
warami	wa-ra-mi	hello, welcome
yanu	ye-noo	I am going – said when leaving

== English words borrowed from Dharug ==
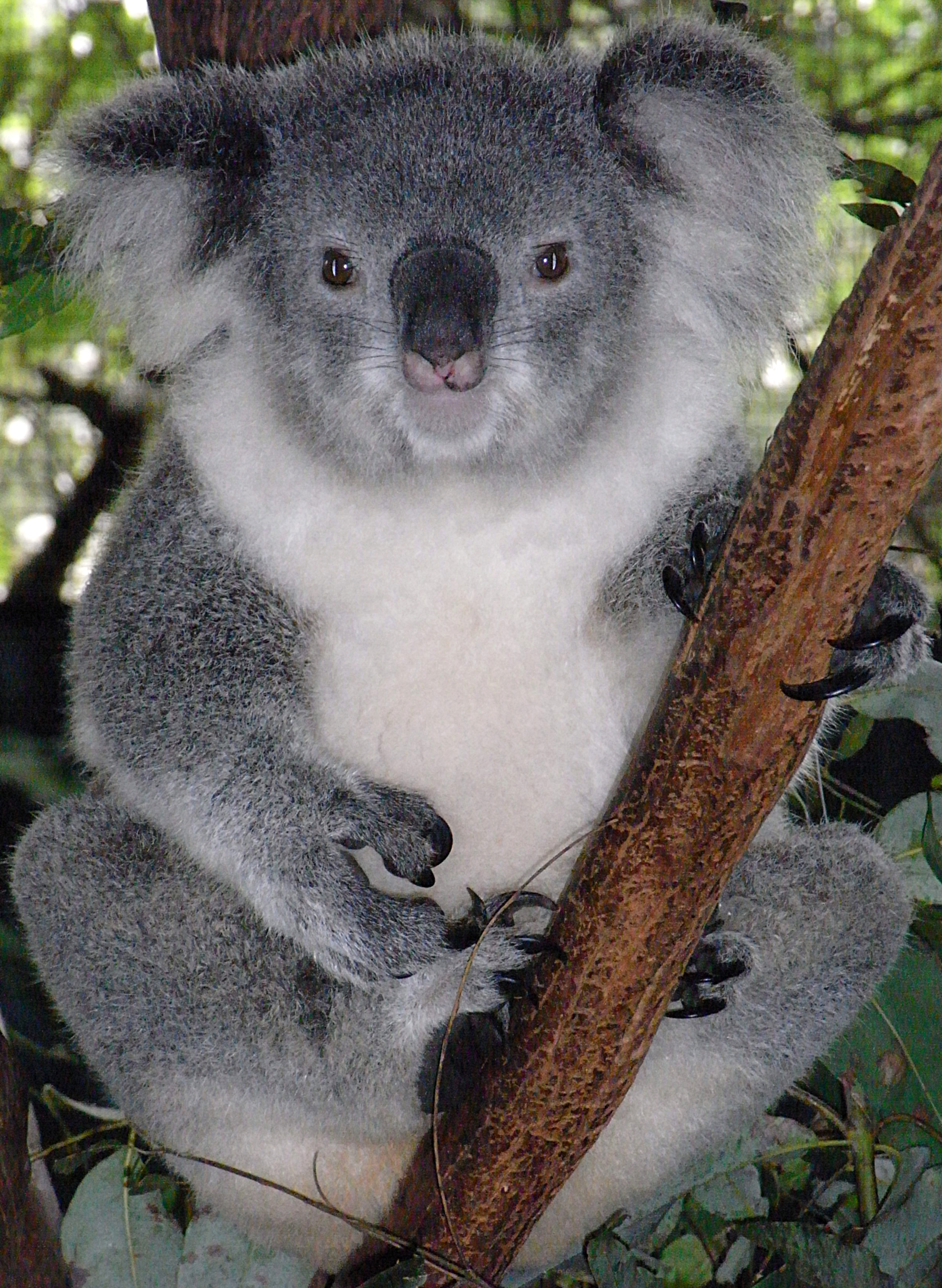
The word koala is derived from gula in the Dharuk and Gundungurra languages.

Examples of English words borrowed from Dharug are:

- Names of animals: dingo, koala, wallaby, wombat and perhaps pademelon, wallaroo, potoroo
- Trees and plants: burrawang, kurrajong, geebung, myall, waratah
- The tools boomerang, a word from the Turuwal sub-group, and woomera (spear-thrower)
- The word gin, a term now considered derogatory for an Aboriginal woman, is believed to derive from Dharug diyin, 'woman'
- The word koradji, referring to an Aboriginal person with traditional knowledge of medicine, comes from Dharug.
