= Thawa language =

Endangered Pama–Nyungan language of Australia

Thawa
- Native to: Australia
- Region: New South Wales
- Ethnicity: Thawa
- Native speakers: (undated figure of very few)
- Revival: 2015
- Language family: Pama–Nyungan: Yuin–Kuric; Yuin; Tharawal; Southern Coastal Yuin?; Thawa

Language codes
- ISO 639-3: xtv
- Glottolog: None sout2771 included in Southern Coastal Yuin
- AIATSIS: S52

Thawa (Note: Sometimes spelt Thaua, Dhawa, Thauaira, and other variations.) is a nearly extinct Australian Aboriginal language of New South Wales with only very few speakers including certain local elders. It is sometimes classified with Dyirringany as a dialect of Southern Coastal Yuin, though it is not clear how close the two varieties actually were.

In 2015 local Yuin people collaborated with the Tathra Public School in Tathra to create a new app as a teaching aid for both Thawa and the Dhurga language, using old audio recordings of elders as well as documentation created by early explorers and settlers in the region. One of the major contributors to the project, Graham Moore, has also written an Aboriginal language book.
