= Dyirringany language =

Extinct Pama–Nyungan language of Australia

Dyirringany
- Djiringanj
- Region: New South Wales, Australia
- Ethnicity: Djiringanj
- Era: attested 1902
- Revival: 2019
- Language family: Pama–Nyungan: Yuin–Kuric; Yuin; Tharawal?; Southern Coastal Yuin?; Dyirringany

Language codes
- ISO 639-3: None (mis)
- Glottolog: None sout2771 included in Southern Coastal Yuin
- AIATSIS: S51

Dyirringañ, also spelt Dyirringany and Djiringanj, is an Australian Aboriginal language of the Yuin people of New South Wales.

Although it is not listed in Bowern (2011), the people are ethnically Yuin. The only attestation of the language are manuscripts and grammar, dating from 1902. It is sometimes classified with Thawa, as a dialect of Southern Coastal Yuin.

Bermagui Public School, a primary school in Bermagui, has taught local Aboriginal languages including Djiringanj and the Dhurga language, along with the associated cultures, since 2019.
