= Yuin–Kuric languages =

Family of Australian Aboriginal languages

Yuin–Kuric
- Geographic distribution: New South Wales, ACT, and SE Queensland, Australia
- Ethnicity: Yuin, Eora, Koori
- Linguistic classification: Pama–Nyungan: Southeast; New South Wales; Yuin–Kuric
- Subdivisions: Yuin; Yora; Kuri

Language codes
- Glottolog: yuin1243
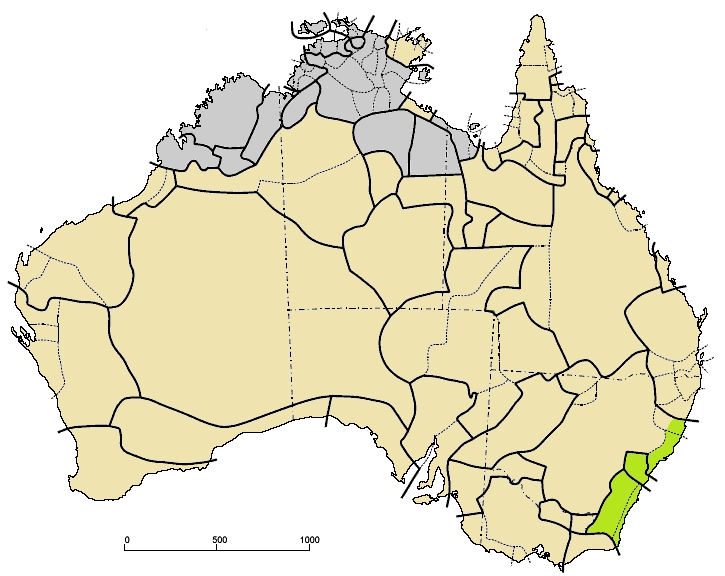
- Yuin–Kuric languages (green) among other Pama–Nyungan (tan). From southwest to northeast, the three groups are Yuin, Yora, and Kuri.

The Yuin–Kuric languages are a group of mainly extinct Australian Aboriginal languages traditionally spoken in the south east of Australia. They belong in the Pama–Nyungan family. These languages are divided into the Yuin, Kuri, and Yora groups, although exact classifications vary between researchers. Yuin–Kuric languages were spoken by the original inhabitants of what are now the cities of Sydney and Canberra.

The name of this grouping was coined by Wilhelm Schmidt in 1919, and it refers to the two groups which define the geographical extent of the subgroup. The labels of all three subgroups reflect the word for 'man' or 'Aboriginal person' in their respective included languages.

The word koala is derived from the name gula for the animal in the Dharug language, a Yuin–Kuri language within the Yora group, and the same word occurs in other Yuin–Kuri languages, such as Gundungurra, within the Yuin group.

As of 2020, Yuin is listed as one of 20 languages prioritised as part of the Priority Languages Support Project, being undertaken by First Languages Australia and funded by the Department of Communications and the Arts. The project aims to "identify and document critically-endangered languages — those languages for which little or no documentation exists, where no recordings have previously been made, but where there are living speakers".

== Languages ==
The constituent languages are groups are arranged from southwest to northeast:

=== Yuin group ===
The Yuin (southern) group includes:

- The extinct Tharawal languages spoken along the South Coast of New South Wales, including Thawa, Dyirringany, Thurga, Tharawal, and possibly Gweagal.
- Nyamudy language spoken by people around Canberra
- Ngarigo (Ngarigu) spoken by the Ngarigo people
- Ngunnawal, also known as Gundungurra (Gundungura, Gudungura, or Gandangara), spoken by the Ngunnawal people and Gandangara people in inland south-eastern New South Wales in the now Yass region.

=== Yora group ===

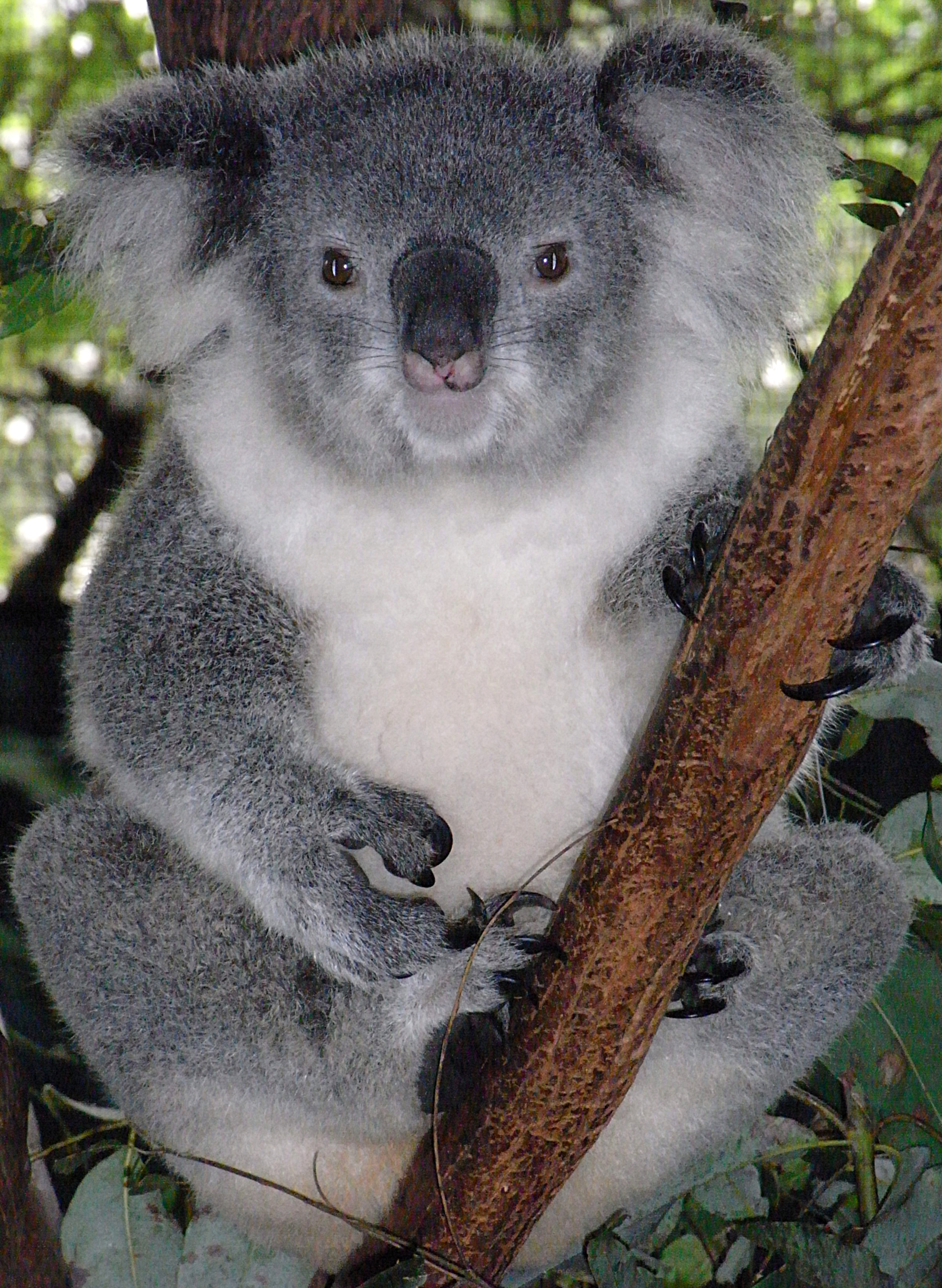
The word "koala" is derived from "gula" in the Dharuk and Gundungurra languages

The Yora or Iyora (central) group is accepted by Dixon.

- Dharug, an extinct language which attempts are being made to revive.
- Darkinjung, an extinct language.

They were spoken in the region of Sydney.

=== Kuri group ===
The Kuri (northern) group has been reduced to its southernmost languages:

- Worimi languages: Worimi (Worimi, Katthang, Birrpayi), Awabakal
- Dunghutti language

Languages once classified as Kuric include Yugambal, Yuggarabul (Yuggera), and Nganyaywana (Anaiwan) further north.

== Comparison ==
Jeremy Steele's partial reconstruction of the Sydney language includes a comparison of pronouns in several Yuin–Kuric languages. The following partial and simplified version shows some of the similarities and differences across the family:

Language	Group	I	You (singular)	He	We two (inclusive)	We two (exclusive)	We all (inclusive)
Gundungurra	Yuin	gula-ngGa, gula-nga	gulandyi	dhanaladhu	gulanga	gulangala(ng)	gulanyan, gulambanya(n)
Tharawal	Yuin	ngayagang(ga)	nyindigang	namarang	ngulgang	ngangaling(ga)	nyulgang(ga)
Awabakal	Kuri	ngaduwa	nginduwa	nyuwuwa	bali	balinuwa	ngiyin
Darkinjung	Yora	ngaya	nyindi, ngindi	nuwa	ngaliya	ngungaliya	ngiyang
Dharug	Yora	ngaya	nyindi, ngindi	nanu	ngali	—	—
