= Minyambuta =

Indigenous Australian tribe

- Indigenous Australian tribe
- Location: Northern Victoria, Australia

The Minjambuta, also known as the Mogullumbidj, were an Indigenous Australian tribe of northern Victoria.

== Language ==
Minyambuta
- Native to: Australia
- Region: Victoria
- Ethnicity: Minyambuta
- Era: attested 1904
- Language family: Pama–Nyungan: Gippsland; Pallanganmiddang? Dhudhuroa?; Minyambuta

Language codes
- ISO 639-3: –
- Glottolog: None
- AIATSIS: S90

R. H. Mathews described their language as close to Dhudhuroa, indeed as a dialect of that tongue. Though this conflicts with other reports, the identification is now considered almost certain.

== Country ==
The Minjambuta's tribal lands spread through some 2,400 square miles (6,200 km^{2}) over the upper reaches of the Buffalo, King, Ovens, and Broken rivers east of Violet Town. They extended southwards to the Dividing Range. These boundaries and their extension were established by Norman Tindale on the basis of inferences: he deduced their area by exclusion after the adjacent tribal areas were determined and the gap not covered was then assigned to the Minjambuta. The Dhudhuroa boundary lay to the northeast, the Jaitmathang to their east.

== Social life ==
Very little is known of this tribe, and what little knowledge has been transmitted comes from the records preserved by the early ethnographer R. H. Mathews in 1904. The Minjambuta social organisation appears to share more similarities with those of the tribes to their south, and their Wonggoa initiation is thought to be alluded by Mathews when he included the following material without specifying the Minjambuta, but, contextually, according to Tindale, it would apply to them:

Of the Mitta Mitta and Ovens Rivers the following is a brief outline of the procedures as told to me by an old native: At the first appearance of puberty, the girl is taken out of the camp by some old women, and her body is anointed all over with opossum fat and ground charcoal. The fresh skin of a ring-tail opossum is procured and cut into very narrow strips. These strands, with the fur remaining upon them, are then twisted until they become small, rounded strings, resembling cords. The arms of the girl, both above and below the elbow, are then bandaged with a few coils of this string.She is then lifted into the fork of a sapling or tree, from six to eight feet above the ground. A fire is lighted at the butt of the tree, on the windward side of it, and a number of green boughs laid upon it. Presently, a dense smoke is produced, which ascends up around the girl, the quantity of fume being regulated so that it will not suffocate her. This lasts for some hours, when the novice is removed to a camp close at hand, where she and her companions remain for the night. The same ceremonial is repeated for a day or two longer, or until the old women are satisfied that their object has been attained. A waist-belt is now given to the girl, to which is attached a small apron, dyabeng, which hangs down in front. She is now qualified to become a wife.

Minjambuta territory took in Mount Buffalo (Dordordonga) which was a key centre of the bogong moth's aestivation, and together with many other regional tribes, particularly the Djilamatang, the Walgalu and the Jaitmathang, they would travel up to these areas rich in this sweet food source, (Note: "Bogong months are sweet and nutty, and quite good eating. Aboriginals considered them a great delicacy and prized them above all other foods." (Massola 1969, p. 147)) and, while harvesting their share, conduct inter-tribal ceremonies which were timed to coincide with this season of abundance

== History ==
In establishing the Buffalo area as a heifer station, the pastoralist George Faithfull made no secret of the fact he had his convict workers shoot the indigenous landowners, at least 60 being killed in retribution for the killing of four stockmen and the loss of some livestock. One of his employees later put the figure at close to 300. The first to reach the Buffalo high plain, by mid-century, were James and John Manfield, who saw evidence of prior indigenous occupation but no aboriginals. Two stockmen, Jim Brown and Jack Wells, employed by the squatter George Gray at Cobungra near Mt Hotham also visited the Bogong High Plains in search of fresh pastures in 1851. Within the decade, stock were being regularly driven into these former tribal lands to graze there.

== Alternative names ==
- Mr Buffalo tribe (Note: "Those which would have had Bogong moth summer habitats within their tribal territories would be the Jaimathang or Omeo tribe, the Djilamatang of the Upper Murray and the Minjambuta or Mt Buffalo tribe." (Flood 1980, p. 72))
- Minyambuta
- Mogolloombuk
- Mogullumbidj
- Mogullumbitch
- Mokalumbeet

== Sources ==
- "AIATSIS map of Indigenous Australia". AIATSIS.
- Ekkel, Ruby (2025). "'Making friends with lyre-birds': Alice Manfield and settler belonging in Mount Buffalo National Park". Settler Colonial Studies. 15 (2): 238–259.
- Flood, Josephine (2000) [First published 1980]. The moth hunters: Aboriginal prehistory of the Australian Alps. Australian Institute of Aboriginal Studies. ISBN 978-0-855-75085-5.
- Head, Lesley (2000). Second Nature: The History and Implications of Australia As Aboriginal Landscape. Syracuse University Press. p. 82. ISBN 978-0-815-60587-4 – via Internet Archive.
- Massola, Aldo (1962). "Aborigines of the Victorian high plains". Proceedings of the Royal Society of Victoria. 75 (2): 319–325.
- Massola, Aldo (1969). Journey to Aboriginal Victoria. Rigsby.
- Mathews, R. H. (1904). "Ethnological notes on the Aboriginal tribes of New South Wales and Victoria" (PDF). Journal and Proceedings of the Royal Society of New South Wales. 38: 203–381 – via Internet Archive.
- Mathews, R. H. (1909). "The Dhudhuroa Language of Victoria". American Anthropologist. 11 (2): 278–284. doi:10.1525/aa.1909.11.2.02a00100. JSTOR 659469.
- Slattery, Deirdre (2015). Australian Alps: Kosciuszko, Alpine and Namadgi National Parks. Csiro Publishing. ISBN 978-1-486-30172-0.
- Tindale, Norman Barnett (1974). "Minjambuta (VIC)". Aboriginal Tribes of Australia: Their Terrain, Environmental Controls, Distribution, Limits, and Proper Names. Australian National University Press. ISBN 978-0-708-10741-6.
- Wesson, Sue Caroline (2002). The Aborigines of Eastern Victoria and Far-South Eastern New South Wales, 1830 to 1910 (PDF). Melbourne University dissertation.
