= Yaithmathang =

Indigenous Australian people in the State of Victoria

The Jaitmatang, also spelled Yaithmathang, and referred to as Omeo, are an Indigenous Australian people of the State of Victoria.

== Name ==
Jaitmatang/Yaithmathang, according to the early ethnographer Alfred William Howitt, may have derived from Ya-yau their word for "yes," and thang ("speech/tongue"). (Note: Clark gives the following page (p.78))

== Language ==
Yaithmathang
- Gundungerre
- Native to: Australia
- Region: Victoria
- Ethnicity: Yaithmathang
- Extinct: (date missing)
- Language family: Pama–Nyungan: Yuin–Kuric; Yuin; Ngarigo; Yaithmathang

Language codes
- ISO 639-3: xjt
- Glottolog: jait1239 Jaitmatang
- AIATSIS: S43

Ian D. Clark, after subjecting evidence for the Omeo languages in early wordlists, identified a distinctive tongue differing substantially from those – Dhudhuroa and Pallanganmiddang – spoken by tribes to the immediate north. After then examining whether it might be a variety of Ngarigu or had a separate name Harold Koch and others consider it a southern variety of the Yuin sub-branch of the Yuin-Kuric language family. Koch's analysis points to a possibility that the Jaitmatang, like their neighbours the Wolgal and the Ngarigo, spoke dialects of one language, with Clark considering it a dialect of Ngarigo.

== Country ==
The Jaitmatang's lands extended some 3,000 square miles (7,800 km^{2}), including the headwaters of Mitta Mitta and Tambo rivers; from the Indi River to "Tom Groggin Run" and perhaps even the Ovens River. To the south their tribal boundaries ran to Omeo and Mount Delusion, 25 miles north of Omeo.

== Social organization ==
Hordes:

- Kandangoramittung (Note: "Mittung ('midhang..is the equivalent of -baluk in the Kulin languages of central Victoria." The -baluk suffix indicates a tribal grouping, and may correspond to the wurrung of those central languages ("tongue, speech"). However, the evidence points to it having a denotative function as an ethnonymic signifier.) (horde on the Omeo plains)
- The Djilamatang were considered by early authorities to have been a hordes of the Jaitmathang.
- According to Robert Hamilton Mathews, Alfred William Howitt's reference to a "Theddora horde" actually denoted a distinct tribal grouping, Dhudhuroa. Norman Tindale separates them, though noting that Aldo Massola supported the traditional view that the Jaitmatang and Dhudhuroa belonged to the same tribal unity.

The Jaitmathang had an annual migratory cycle, camping on the lower plateaus of their land through the colder, winter period, and then, once the snow began to melt, shifting into the highlands to pass the summer hunting in the alpine zone.

== History of contact ==
The Jaitmathang lands were first penetrated and settlements began to be established there, in 1828. Following the Victorian gold rush, miners also discovered gold in the Omeo area, at Livingstone Creek, off the Mitta Mitta River, and as the news spread, a large mass of gold-diggers rushed to settle and pan the waters of the area. Within a decade, by 1862, only 4-5 Jaitmathang could be counted who had survived the disruption.

== Alternative names ==
- Ya-itma-thang
- Yaithmathang
- Muddhang (Mitta Mitta horde)
- Mudthang
- Kandangoramittung (horde on the Omeo plains)
- Jandangara
- Gundanara, Gundanora
- Brajerak (rude exonym for them used by coastal tribes)

== Sources ==
- Clark, Ian D (2009). "Dhudhuroa and Yaithmathang languages and social groups in north-east Victoria – a reconstruction". Aboriginal History. 33. Australian National University: 201–229. JSTOR 24046829.
- Howitt, Alfred William (1904). The native tribes of south-east Australia (PDF). Macmillan.
- Tindale, Norman Barnett (1974a). "Jaitmathang (VIC)". Aboriginal Tribes of Australia: Their Terrain, Environmental Controls, Distribution, Limits, and Proper Names. Australian National University Press. ISBN 978-0-708-10741-6. Archived from the original on 2 July 2017.
- Tindale, Norman Barnett (1974b). "Duduroa (VIC)". Aboriginal Tribes of Australia: Their Terrain, Environmental Controls, Distribution, Limits, and Proper Names. Australian National University Press. ISBN 978-0-708-10741-6. Archived from the original on 2 July 2017.
