= Djilamatang =

The Djilamatang were thought to be a distinct Indigenous Australian people of the state of Victoria, Australia. This has recently been questioned by Ian Clark.

== Language ==
The ethnonym is formed from the word for man, djere. Norman Tindale maintained that the Djilamatang were exterminated by other Aboriginal groups "in post-European times". He places them in the northeast corner of Victoria, "west of Mount Kosciuszko on the upper headwaters of the Murray River", but the words he quotes (waananga, meaning "no" and djere. "man") as belonging to this group are in fact, according to Barry Blake, Pallanganmiddang and since there is no independent testimony for the Djilamatang lexicon, it is reasonable to surmise that this group spoke a tongue similar to Dhudhuroa.

== Country ==
Area 1,500 sq. m. west of Mount Kosciuszko and on the upper headwaters of the Murray River. They appear to have been exterminated in a period of tribal conflict in the Albury area after white settlement had begun to affect the region. It was then that their traditional enemies, the Jaitmathang, Walgalu, and Ngarigo forged a pact or mutual alliance to get rid of their common enemy.

== People ==
Norman Tindale classified the Djilamatang as probably constituting a distinct tribal unity, though he noted that Alfred William Howitt considered them to be a horde of the Jaitmathang. Recently, Ian Clark has argued that the bare 5 sources used by Tindale to make this inference, the first dating from 1860 do not support his conclusion.

== Lifestyle ==
When the bogong moth began to proliferate, the Djilamatang, together with several other tribes of the region, such as the Dhudhuroa, the Jaitmathang, the Ngarigo, the Ngunawal and the Minjambuta (postulated by Dr Ian Clark to be a Wiradjuri exonym for Pallanganmiddang) entered into negotiation to settle outstanding disputes, and meet up to engage in rites of transit on the territories, and trade, in order to collectively forage in the Bogong areas to hunt the moth. These multitribal assemblies were often as large as 700 people, and coincided with bora ceremonial rituals and corroborees to initiate the young men.

== Alternative names ==
- Waananga (Their word for "no")

== Sources ==
- Blake, Barry J.; Reid, Julie (1999). "Pallanganmiddang: a language of the Upper Murray". Aboriginal History. 23: 15–31. JSTOR 24046758.
- Clark, Ian D (2009). "Dhudhuroa and Yaithmathang languages and social groups in north-east Victoria – a reconstruction". Aboriginal History. 33: 201–229. JSTOR 24046829.
- Slattery, Deirdre (2015). Australian Alps: Kosciuszko, Alpine and Namadgi National Parks. Csiro Publishing. ISBN 978-1-486-30172-0.
- Tindale, Norman Barnett (1974). "Djilamatang (VIC)". Aboriginal Tribes of Australia: Their Terrain, Environmental Controls, Distribution, Limits, and Proper Names. ANU Press. ISBN 978-0-708-10741-6.
