= Pallanganmiddang people =

Indigenous Australian people

The Pallanganmiddang, otherwise known as the Waveroo or Waywurru, were an Indigenous Australian people of North-eastern Victoria, in the state of Victoria, Australia. Recent scholarship has suggested that In Norman Tindale's classic study his references to a Djilamatang tribe and their language arguably refer in good part to the Pallanganmiddang (or Dhudhuroa)

== Name ==
Many tribe and language names in the area end in a suffix variously spelt -matong, -middang, -mirttong, -mathang, and -mittung; this suffix may have an etymological association with "speech" or "tongue" (compare Western Australian language Kalaamaya's midhany "tongue", likely a cognate), and, in Pallanganmiddang's case, seems to denote an ethnonym.

== History of contact ==
The earliest possible reference to this group might be a mention in the papers of George Augustus Robinson, Victorian Protector of Aborigines in the 1840s, to the Pal-ler a miiter.

== Language ==
Pallanganmiddang is classified by R. M. Dixon as one of two members of the Upper Murray Group, the other being Dhudhuroa. It was probably spoken by people inhabiting the area the northwest of the Dhudhuroa, though the overlap of vocabulary between the two languages appears to be low, about 10.7% A vocabulary of 46 words with the title "Pallanganmiddah" was provided by Thomas Mitchell, a resident of Tangambalanga, as early as 1878. A.W.Howitt first asserted that their language was "utterly different" from that of surrounding peoples, and modern research has confirmed that it lacked any close affinity with the other languages of that area.

== Country ==
Robert Smyth's 1878 map located a PallunganMiddah group southeast of Wodonga, in the area of Tangambalanga about the terrain of the northern Kiewa River and Tallangatta around the Mitta Mitta River. Howitt's mention of a Balaung Karar group to the south-west of Wodonga has been taken, by Barry Blake, as a reference to (Balaung/Pallungan) to the same people.

== Society ==
The Pallanganmiddang, in part at least, appear to have adopted the Kulin patrimoiety system with its eaglehawk (Puntyil) –crow (Waang/waa) (Note: Also written more in older sources Bunjil-Waang- (Koch, Hercus & Kelly 2018, pp. 154ff.)) moieties. This division, meaning that names were inherited through the father rather than the mother was a characteristic of Central Victorian Aboriginal culture, but deviated from the general norm in South-East Australia. Diane Barwick identified at least two clans, who used the Kulin terms rather than the corresponding Pallanganmiddang terminology (warrimu/berontha) to denote their respective moieties, a fact that suggests they intermarried with the contiguous southern and western Kulin groups.

- Yowung-illam-balluk (Note: balak a clan-marking suffix in Kulin languages. (Clark 2009, p. 210)) in the Mount Buffalo area, forming an eaglehawk moiety
- 'Warrarak-balluk in the district of Wangaratta, constituting a crow moiety (waa).

== Sources ==
- "Austlang: S44: Dhudhuroa". Australian Institute of Aboriginal and Torres Strait Islander Studies.
- Barwick, Diane E. (1984). "Mapping the past: an atlas of Victorian clans 1835-1904" (PDF). Aboriginal History. 8: 100–131.
- Blake, Barry; Reid, Julie (2002). "The Dhudhuroa language of northeastern Victoria: a description based on historical sources" (PDF). Aboriginal History. 26 (Annual 2002): 177–210.
- Blake, Barry J.; Reid, Julie (1999). "Pallanganmiddang: a language of the Upper Murray" (PDF). Aboriginal History. 23: 15–31.
- Clark, Ian D. (2009). "Dhudhuroa and Yaithmathang languages and social groups in north-east Victoria– a reconstruction". Aboriginal History. 33: 201–229. JSTOR 24046829.
- Clark, Ian D. (November 2010). "Aboriginal language areas in Northeast Victoria: 'Mogullumbidj' reconsidered". Victorian Historical Journal. 81 (2): 181–192.
- Clark, Ian D. (2011). "Aboriginal languages in North-east Victoria – the status of "Waveru" reconsidered". Journal of Australian Indigenous Issues. 14 (4): 2–22.
- Dixon, Robert M. W. (2004) [First published 2002]. Australian Languages: Their Nature and Development. Vol. 1. Cambridge University Press. ISBN 978-0-521-47378-1.
- Howitt, Alfred William (1904). The native tribes of south-east Australia (PDF). Macmillan.
- Koch, Harold; Hercus, Luise; Kelly, Piers (2018). "Moiety Names in South-Eastern Australia: Distribution and Reconstructed History". In McConvell, Patrick; Kelly, Piers; Lacrampe, Sébastien (eds.). Skin, Kin and Clan: The Dynamics of Social Categories in Indigenous Australia. Australian National University Press. pp. 139–177. ISBN 978-1-760-46164-5.
- Mitchell, Thomas (1878). "List of Words: English-Native. Pallanganmiddah Tribe". In Smyth, Robert Brough (ed.). The Aborigines of Victoria: with notes relating to the habits of the natives of other parts of Australia and Tasmania (PDF). Vol. 2. Melbourne: J. Ferres, gov't printer. p. 67.
- Tindale, Norman Barnett (1974). "Duduroa (VIC)". Aboriginal Tribes of Australia: Their Terrain, Environmental Controls, Distribution, Limits, and Proper Names. Australian National University Press. ISBN 978-0-708-10741-6. Archived from the original on 2 July 2017.
