= Bidhawal language =

Australian Aboriginal language

Bidhawal
- Birrdhawal, Bidwell
- mŭk-dhang
- Native to: Australia
- Region: Gippsland
- Ethnicity: Bidhawal
- Extinct: (date missing)
- Language family: Pama–Nyungan: Gippsland; Gunaikurnai; Bidhawal
- Writing system: Latin transcription

Language codes
- ISO 639-3: ihw
- Glottolog: gana1268
- AIATSIS: S49
- Location of Bidawal Country in Victoria

The Bidawal language was an Australian Aboriginal language, either a dialect of or closely related to the Kurnai language, formerly spoken by the Bidhawal. However, it had borrowed a number of words referring to mammals, birds and celestial bodies from Ngarigo, as well as a smaller number of words from Thawa and Dhudhuroa. The Bidawal called their own dialect mŭk-dhang (or muk-thang) ("good speech"), and that of the neighbouring Kurnai gūnggala-dhang 'strangers' language'. The Kurnai, however, called their own dialect mŭk-dhang, and that of the Bidawal kwai-thang ("rough speech"). (Note: Tindale's "dhang" has been written as "thang" in accordance with Dixon.) According to Alfred William Howitt, Bidhawal is a mixture of Kurnai, Ngarigo and Yuin.

== Name ==
Based on historical spellings, Corey Theatre regularized the form as Pirtawal with a retroflex stop.

Historical spellings of Pirtawal
Representation	Translation listed (Language attributed to)	Source
Bid.doo.wul	Wild black (Maneroo)	Robinson (1844, see Clark, 2000)
Bidooal	Wild black (Mallogottor mittong)	Robinson (1844, see Clark, 2000)
Birtowall	Scrub people	Bulmer (in Curr, 1887, p. 540)
Bidwell	-	Bulmer (in Curr, 1887, p. 540)
Bidwelli	-	Bulmer (in Curr, 1887, p. 540)
Bidwell	-	Bulmer (1878, p. 3)
Biduell/Bidwel	-	Howitt (XM690, p. 54)
Biduelli	brida, “scrub” uelli, “dweller”	Howitt (1904, p. 74)
Brida-wali	-	Howitt (n.d.-b, p. 136)
Bridueli	scrub dwelling	Howitt (n.d.-b, p. 136)
Bidwell mittŭng	Bendoc blacks (Maneroo and Ngarigo)	Howitt (n.d.-r, p. 16)
Bidweli	-	Howitt (1886, p. 410)
Beddiwell	-	Mathews (1898, p. 67)
Birdhawal	-	Mathews (1907, p. 346)
Biḍawal	-	Hercus (1969, p. 243)

The name "Bidhawal" is derived from the root pirta 'scrub' followed by what is likely the 'belonging to' suffix similar to equivalents found in geographically more distant languages such as Dharawal and Tharumba.

== Classification ==
The classification of Bidhawal is in dispute between linguists. Eve Fesl classified Bidhawal as a distinct language from Kanai; only 81 forms out of 234 compared were shared between Bidhawal and Kanai. Robert M. W. Dixon considers it to be the easternmost dialect of Kanai, since "[t]he grammatical forms given by Mathews for Bidhawal are almost identical to those for Muk-thang [Kanai], as are most of the verbs and a good proportion of nouns". He attributes the differences to a "strong lexical substratum" from the languages of the constituent tribes which made up the Bidhawal, but believes "there is no evidence that it was a ‘mixed language’ in the sense of being equally related to two or more parent languages". Ian Clark also considers it to be a Kanai dialect. R. H. Mathews, who documented the most of Bidhawal, referred to Bidhawal and Kanai as "dialects", though he also noted that "[w]hile many of the words of the Gūnggaladhang are nearly the same as those of the Birdhawal, there are a large number which are altogether different. The closest agreementis found among the pronouns and some of the verbs". Howitt thought the Bidhawal "may be considered an appendix to the Ngarigo, Murring, and Kurnai, being a mixture from them all."

== Phonology ==
Bidhawal consonants
	Labial	Dental	Alveolar	Retroflex	Palatal	Velar
Plosive	p~b	t̪~d̪ ⟨dh, th⟩	t/d	ʈ/ɖ	c~ɟ ⟨ty, dy⟩	k~ɡ
Nasal	m	n̪ ⟨nh⟩	n	ɳ	ɲ ⟨ny, ñ⟩	ŋ ⟨ng⟩
Rhotic			r			
Lateral			l			
Approximant	w			ɻ~r~ɾ ⟨r⟩	j ⟨y⟩	

== Grammar ==
=== Pronouns ===
Pronouns are inflected for person, number, and case. There are no gendered pronouns.

Bidhawal pronouns
			Singular	Dual	Plural
Nominative	1st person	inclusive	Ngaiu	Ngallu	Ngangun
Nominative	1st person	exclusive	Ngaiu	Ngallung	Ngangunnang
Nominative	2nd person		Ngindu	Ngindubul	Ngindigan
Nominative	3rd person		Mindha	Mindhabullong	Mindhagullang
Possesive	1st person	inclusive	Ngaindya	–	–
Possesive	1st person	exclusive	Ngaindya	–	–
Possesive	2nd person		Ngingunna	–	–
Possesive	3rd person		Ngaianga	–	–

The pronouns for Kurnai (Gūnggaladhang) are very similar to those for Bidhawal.

== Sources ==
- Barwick, Diane E. (1984). McBryde, Isabel (ed.). "Mapping the past: an atlas of Victorian clans 1835-1904". Aboriginal History. 8 (2): 100–131. JSTOR 24045800.
- Dixon, R. M. W. (2002). Australian Languages: Their Nature and Development. Cambridge University Press. ISBN 978-0-521-47378-1.
- Howitt, A. W. (1886). "On the Migrations of the Kurnai Ancestors". The Journal of the Anthropological Institute of Great Britain and Ireland. 15: 419–420.
- Howitt, A. W. (2010) [First published 1904]. The Native Tribes of South-East Australia. Cambridge University Press. pp. 79–81. ISBN 9781108006323.
- Mathews, R. H. (October 4, 1907). "Language of the Birdhawal Tribe, in Gippsland, Victoria". Proceedings of the American Philosophical Society. 46 (187): 346–359. JSTOR 983474.
- Mathews, R. H. (1908). "Initiationszeremonie des Birdhawal-Stammes (Initiation Ceremony of the Birdhawal Tribe)". Mitteilungen der Anthropologischen Gesellschaft. 38: 17–24.
- Tindale, Norman Barnett (1974). "Bidawal (VIC)". Aboriginal Tribes of Australia: Their Terrain, Environmental Controls, Distribution, Limits, and Proper Names. Australian National University Press. ISBN 978-0-708-10741-6.
