= Ngarigo =

Aboriginal Australian people

Ngarigo/Ngarigu People
- aka: Ngarigo, Bombala tribe, Menero tribe, and Cooma tribe
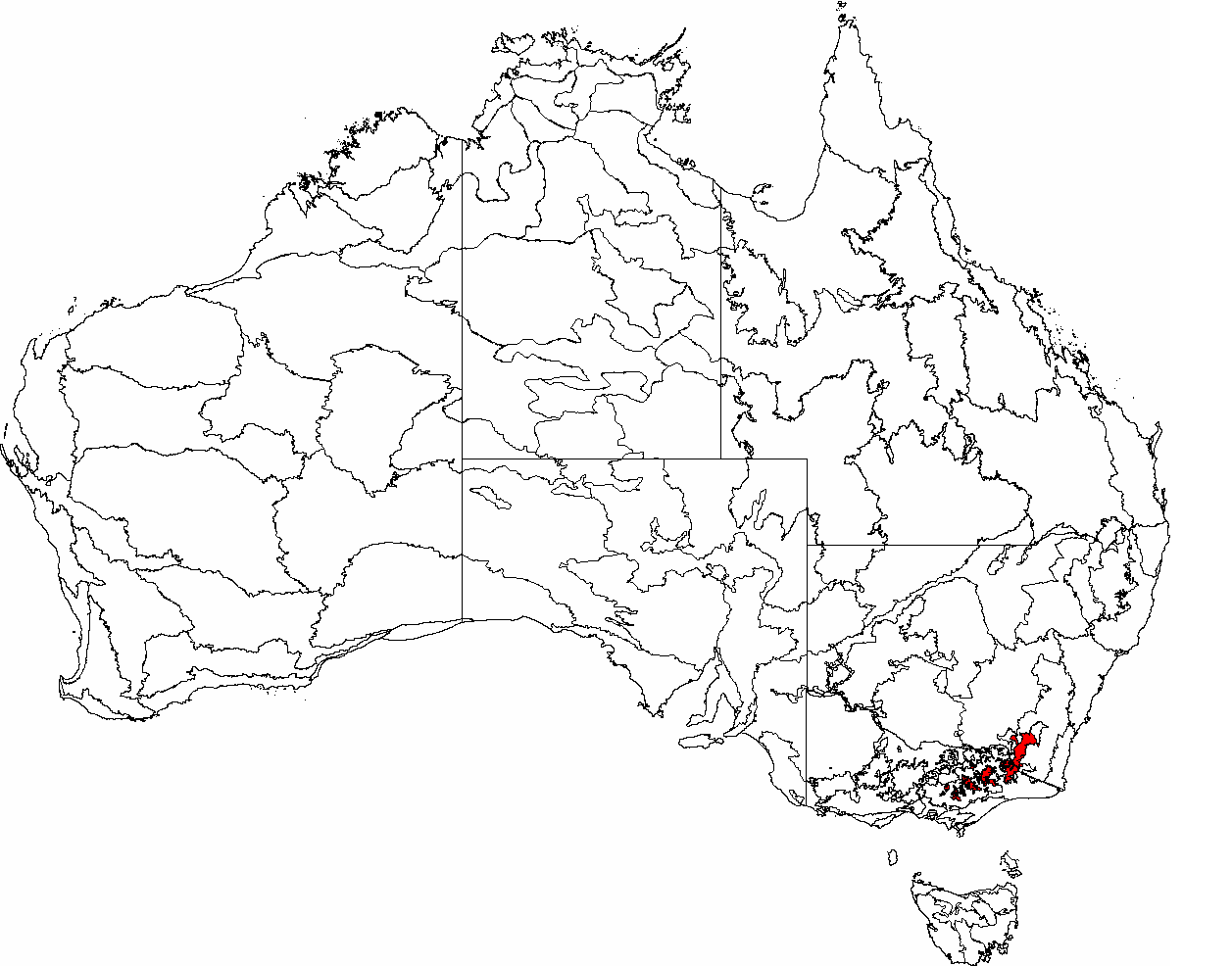
- Australian Alpine bioregion

Hierarchy
- Language family: Pama–Nyungan
- Language branch: Yuin–Kuric
- Language group: Yora
- Group dialects: Ngarigu

Area
- Location: Monaro and Australian Alpine regions of New South Wales and Victoria
- Rivers: Queanbeyan River; Bombala River
- Urban areas: Bombala, New South Wales; Cooma, New South Wales; Delegate, New South Wales; Goongerah, Victoria; Nimmitabel, New South Wales; Omeo, Victoria; Queanbeyan, New South Wales; Tumbarumba, New South Wales; Yass, New South Wales

The Ngarigo people (also spelt Garego, Ngarego, Ngarago, Ngaragu, Ngarigu, Ngarrugu or Ngarroogoo) are Aboriginal Australian people of southeast New South Wales, whose traditional lands also extend around the present border with Victoria. They are named for their language, Ngarigo, which in the 19th century was said to be spoken by the Nyamudy people (also known as Namwich or Yammoitmithang).

== Language ==
Ngarigu has been classified by linguist Robert Dixon as one of two Aboriginal Australian languages of the Southern New South Wales Group, the other being Ngunawal/Gundungurra. It was spoken in the area of Tumut by the Walgalu, in the Canberra-Queanbeyan-Upper Murrumbidgee region by people variously called the Nyamudy, the Namwich or the Yammoitmithang, and also as far south as Victoria's Omeo district. The heartland of Ngarigo speakers, in a more restricted sense, was Monaro.

John Lhotsky, Charles du Vé, John Bulmer, (Note: Bulmer's list should be read with care, given Koch's note that:"15 of the items (from 'canoe' to 'wind') are matched with what should be the gloss of the next word on the list. Thus mamat 'canoe' should rather be glossed 'sun', the next word in the list, which other sources establish as /mamady/. " (Koch 2016, p. 146)) George Augustus Robinson, Alfred W. Howitt and R. H. Mathews compiled early word-lists of the language. In 1963, Luise Hercus managed to recover many terms conserved by descendants living in Orbost.

== Country ==
According to Norman Tindale, following R. H. Mathews, the specific areas lands of the Ngarigo covered some 16,000 km^{2} (6,200 sq mi), centering on the Monaro tableland. The northern limits lay around Queanbeyan. It took in the Bombala River area, and ran south to the vicinity of Delegate and eastwards to Nimmitabel. Their western reaches extended to the Great Dividing Range of the Australian Alps.

== Socio-economic organisation ==
The Ngarigo clan and marriage structure consisted of a dual class system with matrilineal descent.

The Ngarigo would contact, via notched message sticks borne by messengers, other tribes such as the Walgalu and Ngunawal in order to arrange for all to meet up in the Bogong Mountains for the annual feasting off the bogong moth colonies. Corroborees, together with initiation ceremonies at a bora ring were also held, and while in the hills, the Ngarigo and other tribes culled plants like mountain celery and alpine baeckea (Baeckea gunniana) for medicinal ends, preparing the former as a paste for problems in the urinary tract, the latter as a sedative and cough medicine.

== Post-contact history ==
With their hunting areas being stolen by European colonisers running sheep, many Ngarigo took on occasional labour on pastoral runs, but the overall population of the Canberra area suffered a drastic reduction as diseases introduced by the Europeans, such as smallpox, syphilis, influenza, measles and tuberculosis began to take their toll, so that the demise of the tribes was virtually completed within three generations.

== Dispute over the traditional ownership of the Canberra area ==
Several tribes have been historically associated with the area around Canberra, with conflicting claims arising from the assessment of native title rights among those who descend from the Aboriginal peoples of the region. Descendants of the Ngarigo, Ngunawal and Walgalu have vied to assert primacy.

In 2013, an ACT Government anthropological report was released, which concluded that the struggle between various Aboriginal groups for the mantle of Canberra's "First People" was likely to remain uncertain. The report concluded that evidence gathered from the mid-19th century onward was too scant to support any family's claims.

== Alternative names ==
- Bemeringal ("mountain men", of the coastal tribes)
- Bombala tribe
- Bradjerak/Brajeraq (bara, "man,"+ djerak, "savage/angry")
- Cooma tribe
- Currak-da-bidgee
- Guramal, Nguramal, Gurmal
- Menero tribe
- Murring ("men")
- Ngaryo (common typo)

Source: Tindale 1974, p. 198

== Notable people ==
- Ashleigh Barty, world number 1 tennis player and National Indigenous Tennis Ambassador for Tennis Australia

== Sources ==
- ACT Government Genealogy Project: Our Kin Our Country: August 2012 Report (PDF), ACT Government, August 2012, archived from the original (PDF) on 13 March 2018
- Blay, John (2015). On Track: Searching out the Bundian Way. NewSouth Publishing. ISBN 978-1-742-23444-1.
- Dixon, R. M. W. (2002). Australian Languages: Their Nature and Development. Cambridge University Press. ISBN 978-0-521-47378-1.
- Flood, Josephine (2000) [First published 1980]. The moth hunters: Aboriginal prehistory of the Australian Alps. Australian Institute of Aboriginal Studies. ISBN 978-0-855-75085-5.
- Gillespie, Lyall Leslie (1991). Canberra 1820–1913. Australian Government Publishing Service. ISBN 978-0-644-08060-6.
- Howitt, Alfred William (1904). The native tribes of south-east Australia (PDF). Macmillan.
- Koch, Harold (2016). "Documentary sources on the Ngarigu language: the value of a single recording." (PDF). In Austin, Peter K.; Koch, Harold; Simpson, Jane (eds.). Language, land & song: Studies in honour of Luise Hercus. EL Publishing. pp. 145–157.
- Kwok, Natalie (January 2013). Considering traditional Aboriginal affiliations in the ACT region: Draft Report (PDF). ACT government.
- Mathews, R. H. (1908). "Vocabulary of the Ngarrugu tribe, N.S.W." Journal and Proceedings of the Royal Society of New South Wales. 42: 335–342. doi:10.5962/p.359522.
- Slattery, Deirdre (2015). Australian Alps: Kosciuszko, Alpine and Namadgi National Parks. Csiro Publishing. ISBN 978-1-486-30172-0.
- Tindale, Norman Barnett (1974). "Ngarigo (NSW)". Aboriginal Tribes of Australia: Their Terrain, Environmental Controls, Distribution, Limits, and Proper Names. Australian National University.
- Towell, Noel (9 April 2013). "Canberra's first people still a matter for debate". The Canberra Times. Archived from the original on 10 April 2013.
- du Vé, Charles; Bulmer, John (1887). "Moneroo" (PDF). In Curr, Edward Micklethwaite (ed.). The Australian race: its origin, languages, customs, place of landing in Australia and the routes by which it spread itself over the continent. Vol. 3. Melbourne: J. Ferres. pp. 429–233.
