= Dhudhuroa people =

Indigenous Australian people from North-east Victoria

The Dhudhuroa people (or Duduroa) are an Indigenous Australian people of North-eastern Victoria, in the state of Victoria, Australia. About 2,000 descendants exist in Australia in the early 21st century.

== Name ==
The endonym Dhudhuroa has been analysed as being composed of the initial syllable dhu- of their word for "no" (dhubalga) and a form of the word for "mouth" (wurru).

== Language ==
Dhudhuroa has been classified as belonging to the Gippsland branch of the Pama-Nyungan language family. Robert M. W. Dixon classifies it, with Pallanganmiddang, as one of the two languages comprising an Upper Murray Group. Lexicostatistical analysis however shows that it is something of a language isolate within neighbouring languages, with which it shares no more than 11–16% of common vocabulary. It has various dialects, one being Ba Barwidgee.

The language is currently undergoing a revival, and is being taught at Bright Secondary College, Harrietville Primary School, Wooragee Primary School and Dederang Primary School.

== Country ==
The Dhudhuroa language is a language of north-eastern Victoria, existing from before European settlement. According to Norman Tindale, the people inhabit a stretch of territory that encompasses around 4,700 square kilometres (1,800 mi^{2}), embracing the areas defined by the Mitta Mitta and Kiewa rivers. It includes Tallangatta and the Murray River Valley land from Jingellic and Tintaldra to Albury. Tindale's reconstruction of the scanty source evidence to arrive at this conclusion has been judged "poor" due to its over-reliance on a single source, that of A. W. Howitt, by R.M. Dixon.

As of 2015 it is estimated that there are about 2000 descendants of Dhudhuroa, and there is a Dhudhuroa Native Title Group.

== Social organization ==
The early Australian ethnographer Alfred Howitt categorized the Dhudhuroa as a horde of the Jaitmathang, an opinion shared by Aldo Massola in 1962. Linguistically however the vocabulary they used differed from that noted down from tribal informants of various hordes of the Jaitmattang.

== Alternative names ==
=== Tindale ===
- Tharamirttong, Tharamittong
- Tharomattay
- Jeenong-metong (strong-footed ones)
- Dyinning-middhang
- Ginning-matong
- Dhooroomba(?)
- Theddora mittung (hordal term)

=== AIATSIS ===
- Djiningmiddang tribe
- Yaithmathang
- Jaitmatang
- Duduroa
- Djilamatang
- Kandangora
- Omeo tribe
- Theddora
- Yaitmathang
- Dhudhruwa
- Dhuduroa
- Do
- dor
- dee
- Dodora
- Dodoro
- Toutourrite
- Theddora mittung
- Duduruwa
- Tharamirttong
- Tharamittong
- Tharo mattay
- Jeenong metong
- Dyinning middhang
- Ginning matong

== Some words ==
- ngiyambanba (fire)
- geberri (bad)
- gundja (good)
- yambo (fish)
- bandjina (child)
- mema (father)
- baba (mother)
- wingga (dog)
- dalga (mountain)
- gumbarro (gum tree)

== Sources ==
- "Austlang: S44: Dhudhuroa". Australian Institute of Aboriginal and Torres Strait Islander Studies.
- Blake, Barry; Reid, Julie (2002). "The Dhudhuroa language of northeastern Victoria: a description based on historical sources" (PDF). Aboriginal History. 26 (Annual 2002): 177–210.
- Blake, Barry J.; Reid, Julie (1999). "Pallanganmiddang: a language of the Upper Murray". Aboriginal History. 23: 15–31. JSTOR 24046758.
- Clark, Ian D. (2009). "Dhudhuroa and Yaithmathang languages and social groups in north-east Victoria – a reconstruction". Aboriginal History. 33: 201–229. JSTOR 24046829.
- Dixon, R. M. W. (2002). Australian Languages: Their Nature and Development. Cambridge University Press. ISBN 978-0-521-47378-1.
- Howitt, Alfred William (1904). The native tribes of south-east Australia (PDF). Macmillan.
- Jacks, Timna (10 October 2015). "VCE Indigenous language students awaken 'sleeping' Dhudhuroa tongue". The Age.
- Massola, Aldo (1962). "Aborigines of the Victorian high plains". Proceedings of the Royal Society of Victoria. 75 (2): 319–325.
- Tindale, Norman Barnett (1974). Aboriginal Tribes of Australia: Their Terrain, Environmental Controls, Distribution, Limits, and Proper Names. Australian National University Press. ISBN 978-0-708-10741-6.
