= Walgalu =

Aboriginal people in New South Wales, Australia

The Walgalu are an Aboriginal people of highland southeast New South Wales, Australia. The Ngambri belong to the Walgalu grouping.

== Language ==
According to some scholars, the Walgalu language is a form of Ngarigo.

== Country ==
According to Norman Tindale, the Walgalu's traditional lands consisted of some 2,600 square miles (6,700 km^{2}) of territory centering around the headwaters of the Murrumbidgee and Tumut rivers. Kiandra was located within their boundaries, whose southern extension ran down Tintaldra, and whose northeastern limits were at Queanbeyan. Josephine Flood argued, on the basis of a note in Alfred William Howitt, that they were attested as far south as the upper Murray site of Kauwambal between Mount Kosciuszko and Mount Cobberas, which would place their summer camping somewhat west of the Djilamatang.

According to Steven Avery, culture group boundaries in southeastern Australia are disputed, due in part to the inexactitude of linguistically assigned boundaries and the uncertainty of historical records.

The Cooma local government website, based on recent research, differentiates between two Aboriginal groups which resided in their region, stating that "the two main groups on Monaro were the Ngarigo people of the tablelands and the Wogul or Wolgalu group in the high country."

== Alternative names ==
- Guramal (Wiradjuri language = "hostile men")
- Gurmal
- Tumut River people
- Tumut tribe
- Walgadu
- Wolgah
- Wolgal
- Murrin

Source: Tindale 1974, p. 199

== Sources ==
- "Aboriginal People of Monaro". Archived from the original on 20 March 2012.
- Avery, Steven (1994). Aboriginal and European Encounter in the Canberra Region: a question of change and the archaeological record. Attorney-General's Department, MA thesis. Archived from the original on 4 October 2011.
- Dixon, R. M. W. (2002). Australian Languages: Their Nature and Development. Cambridge University Press. ISBN 978-0-521-47378-1.
- McBryde, Isabel (1986). "Artefacts, language and interaction: a case study from south-eastern Australia". In Bailey, G.; Callow, P. (eds.). Stone Age Prehistory: studies in memory of Charles McBurney. Oxford University Press. pp. 77–93. ISBN 978-052125773-2.
- Tindale, Norman Barnett (1974). "Walgalu (NSW)". Aboriginal Tribes of Australia: Their Terrain, Environmental Controls, Distribution, Limits, and Proper Names. Australian National University.
