= Dhudhuroa language =

Extinct Australian Aboriginal language

Dhudhuroa
- Victorian Alpine
- Region: North-eastern Victoria, Australia
- Ethnicity: Dhudhuroa, Djilamatang, ?Minjambuta
- Extinct: early 20th century
- Revival: 2010s
- Language family: Pama–Nyungan: Gippsland; Dhudhuroa

Language codes
- ISO 639-3: ddr
- Glottolog: dhud1236
- AIATSIS: S44
- Location of Dhudhuroa Country in Victoria and New South Wales

Dhudhuroa is an extinct Australian Aboriginal language of north-eastern Victoria. As it is no longer spoken, Dhudhuroa is primarily known today from written material collected by R. H. Mathews from Neddy Wheeler. It has gone by numerous names, including Dhudhuroa, the Victorian Alpine language, Dyinningmiddhang, Djilamatang, Theddora, Theddoramittung, Balangamida, and Tharamirttong. Yaitmathang (Jaitmathang), or Jandangara (Gundanora), was spoken in the same area, but was a dialect of Ngarigu.

The Dhudhuroa language is currently undergoing a revival, and is being taught at Bright Secondary College and Wooragee Primary School.

== Phonology ==
=== Consonants ===
	Labial	Dental	Alveolar	Retroflex	Palatal	Velar
Plosive	b	d̪ ⟨dh⟩	d	(ɖ ⟨rd⟩)	ɟ ⟨dj⟩	ɡ
Nasal	m	n̪ ⟨nh⟩	n	(ɳ ⟨rn⟩)	ɲ ⟨ny⟩	ŋ ⟨ng⟩
Lateral			l			
Rhotic			r ⟨rr⟩			
Approximant	w				j ⟨y⟩	

Blake and Reid (2002) suggest that there were possibly two retroflex consonants, but there is not enough evidence for them.

=== Vowels ===
	Front	Central	Back
Close	i iː		u uː
Open		a aː	

== Grammar ==
Nouns are inflected for number, gender and case.

There are three numbers, the singular, dual and plural.

== Sources ==
- Blake, Barry J.; Reid, Julie (2002). "The Dhudhuroa language of northeastern Victoria: a description based on historical sources" (PDF). Aboriginal History. 26: 177–210. JSTOR 24046052.
- Mathews, R. H. (1909). "The Dhudhuroa language of Victoria". American Anthropologist. 11 (2): 278–284. doi:10.1525/aa.1909.11.2.02a00100.
