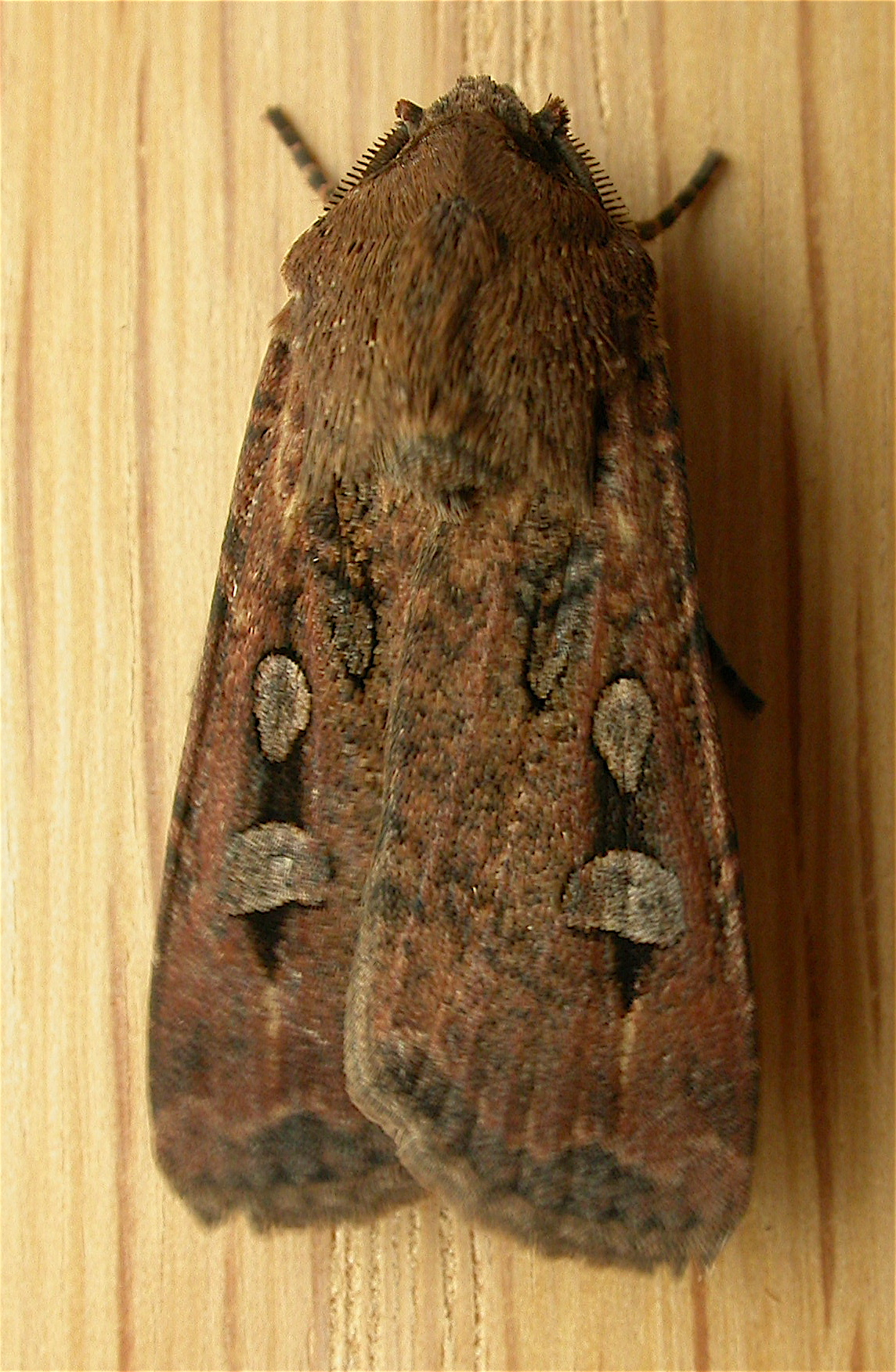
- An adult

Conservation status
- Endangered (IUCN 3.1)

Scientific classification
- Kingdom: Animalia
- Phylum: Arthropoda
- Clade: Pancrustacea
- Class: Insecta
- Order: Lepidoptera
- Superfamily: Noctuoidea
- Family: Noctuidae
- Genus: Agrotis
- Species: A. infusa

Binomial name
- Agrotis infusa (Boisduval, 1832)

Synonyms
- Noctua infusa (Boisduval, 1832); Agrotis spina (Turner, 1920)

= Bogong moth =

Species of moth

The bogong moth (Agrotis infusa) is a temperate species of night-flying moth, notable for its biannual long-distance seasonal migrations towards and from the Australian Alps, similar to the diurnal monarch butterfly. During the autumn and winter it is found in southern Queensland, western New South Wales, western Victoria, Tasmania and also in South and Western Australia. Adult bogong moths breed and larvae hatch during this period, consuming winter pasture plants during their growth. During the spring, the moths migrate south or east and reside in mountains such as Mount Bogong, where they gregariously aestivate over the summer until their return towards breeding grounds again in the autumn.

The moth's name, bogong, is derived from an Australian Aboriginal language; the Dhudhuroa word bugung describes the brown colouration of the moth. It is an icon of Australian wildlife due to its historical role as an important food source and because Aboriginal peoples would come to where the moths spend the summer to feast on them and hold intertribal gatherings. In recent years, it has been seen in major cities like Canberra, Melbourne, and Sydney due to strong winds during its spring migration.

Starting around 1980 and accelerating rapidly after 2016, the bogong moth population has sharply declined as a result of increasingly severe droughts, along with increased temperatures in caves used by the moths for aestivation, both primarily resulting from anthropogenic climate change. In December 2021 the bogong moth was added to the IUCN Red List as an endangered species. In 2026, observations on Zoos Victoria's Moth Tracker indicated a steep rebound.

== Taxonomy and etymology ==
The bogong moth was first described by French lepidopterist Jean Baptiste Boisduval in 1832, who described the moth as Noctua infusa from a type specimen from Australia. He described the moth as having blackish-brown hind wings. However, in 1903 British entomologist George Hampson classified a specimen with white hind wings under this name, alongside another specimen of Agrotis spina with blackish-brown hind wings. Australian amateur entomologist Alfred Jefferis Turner identified A. spina as a synonym of A. infusa in 1920. I. F. B. Common, an Australian entomologist, found specimens with both hind wing colours in 1954. Specimens with the white hind wings were only found during specific months in mercury vapour light traps near Canberra, and he attributed the white hind wing specimens to a seasonal form.

The moth's name, bogong, is derived from the Dhudhuroa word bugung, meaning brown moth. Its presence has contributed to the naming of numerous locations and landmarks. For example, a town, Bogong, in the Australian state of Victoria has been named after the moth. Mount Bogong, located south of the Bogong High Plains, is also named after the moth, with its traditional name, Warkwoolowler, meaning the mountain where Aboriginal people collected the "boo.gong fly". The Taungurung name for the bogong moth is debera.

In the Australian state of New South Wales, a series of mountains in the Kosciuszko National Park are named the Bogong Peaks.

== Description ==
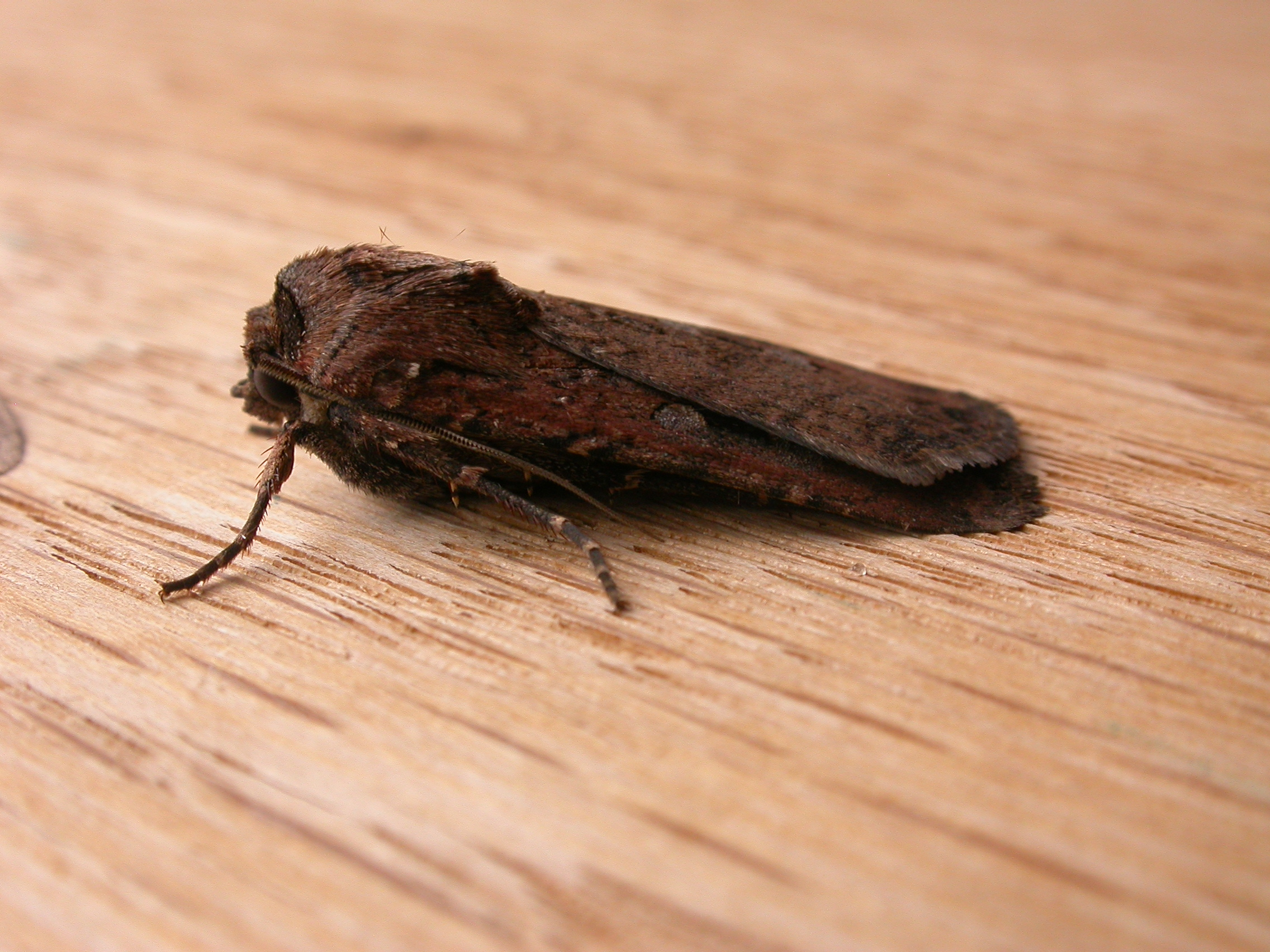
Side profile of an adult

Adult bogong moths have an overall dark brown colouration, with a dark stripe interrupted by two light-coloured spots on the wings, distinguishing it from other moths. There are visual differences between the migratory and nonmigratory forms of the moth; migratory moths have brown hind wings while nonmigratory moths have paler hind wings. Bogong moths have a wingspan of 40–50 mm (1.6–2.0 in), and a body length of around 25–35 mm (1–1.4 in). The average weight of an adult bogong moth is 0.326 grams.

Bogong moth eggs are dome–shaped in appearance and are vertically ridged. They are 0.7 mm (0.03 in) in diameter and 0.4 mm (0.02 in) in height.

Caterpillars initially start out with a pale colouration, but as they grow and consume food they become green with pale and dark stripes and spots. Larvae achieve a maximum length of 50 mm (2.0 in).

== Distribution and habitat ==
Bogong moth populations are primarily located across southern Australia, west of the Great Dividing Range. The regions contain populations of nonmigratory and migratory moths of this species, distinguished by their differing seasonal presences in each region. The adult bogong moth lays eggs across New South Wales, southern Queensland, and northern parts of Victoria, where larvae hatch and grow until adulthood. During the spring season and subsequent summer aestivation, bogong moths migrate south or east towards the Australian Alps, and can be found in the Australian Capital Territory and Bogong Mountains. However, bogong moths can also be found in locations as far as Tasmania and New Zealand due to strong winds that blow them off their path.

=== Breeding grounds ===
Bogong moth eggs and larvae are primarily found in self-mulching soils (soil that mixes itself) and crop pastures, where both wild and agricultural larval food sources are abundant during the autumn and winter seasons. The heavy presence of larvae in these pastures can lead to significant crop damage. During the spring and summer seasons, when grasses overtake these pastures, conditions are unfavourable for larval survival since larvae do not consume these plants. This leads to delayed breeding, as bogong moths are multivoltine and so can raise multiple generations. Instead, adult bogong moths migrate in a southerly direction during the summer and aestivate (remain dormant), until conditions are favourable again.

=== Aestivation sites ===
During the spring migration, adult bogong moths can be found in their ideal aestivation sites, which generally consist of cool, dark caves and crevices but can include spaces underneath tors and even fallen tree trunks. Stable temperatures and humidity make these locations ideal for bogong moth aestivation. Crevices regulate their environment through wind flow, and caves generally have more regular temperatures and greater humidity. This reduces water loss in bogong moths during their inactivity. While temporary sites can be used in lower elevations, these sites undergo massive population fluctuations and movements throughout their use. Permanent aestivation sites are generally found in higher altitudes of 1500 metres (4920 ft) or above, with the largest, most stable aggregations found on the summits of mountains such as Mt. Gingera.

== Life cycle ==
Adult bogong moths lay up to 2000 eggs in the soil or on plants near the soil after returning from aestivation sites in the autumn migration. Incubation times vary depending on temperature, with eggs hatching after a period of 4–7 days in laboratory conditions. The larvae of bogong moths undergo six instars. Caterpillars grow slowly throughout the first three instars, taking until June to develop over the winter. However, the larvae go through fast growth during the spring, reaching the final instar in late August to September, soon before migration. They are active at night, when they feed on plants within breeding grounds. Larvae undergo pupation in soil chambers at a depth of 20–150 mm (0.8-7.9 in). Pupation can last between 3–11 weeks depending on the temperature and environment. Pupae are 20 mm (0.8 in) in length and have a shiny, brown appearance. Adults emerge from the soil chambers and shortly after begin migration. Adult bogong moths are active at night, and have different seasonal behaviours. During the spring, bogong moths feed and migrate south, where they aestivate during the summer. Adult bogong moths are not sexually mature yet, and do not actively seek food during this period of dormancy. In autumn, the moths migrate again and return to their breeding grounds, laying eggs and dying.

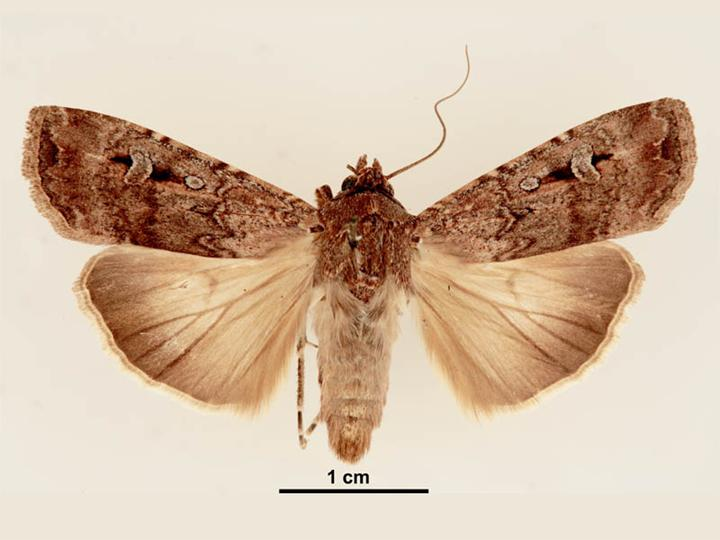
Female dorsal view

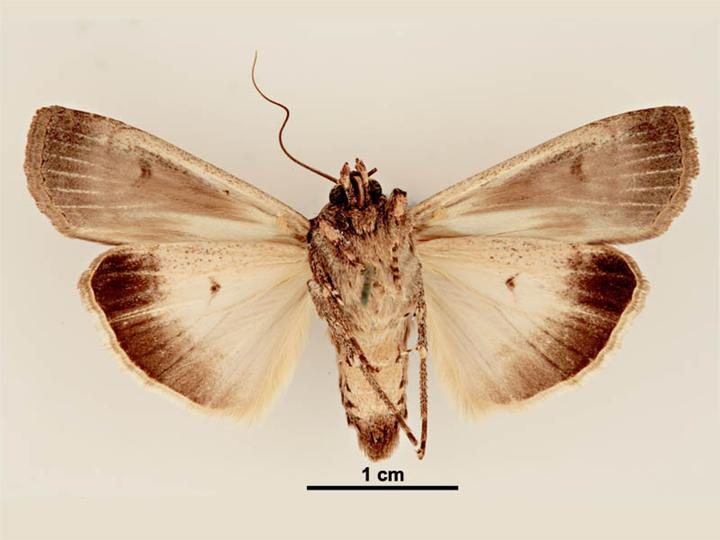
Female ventral view

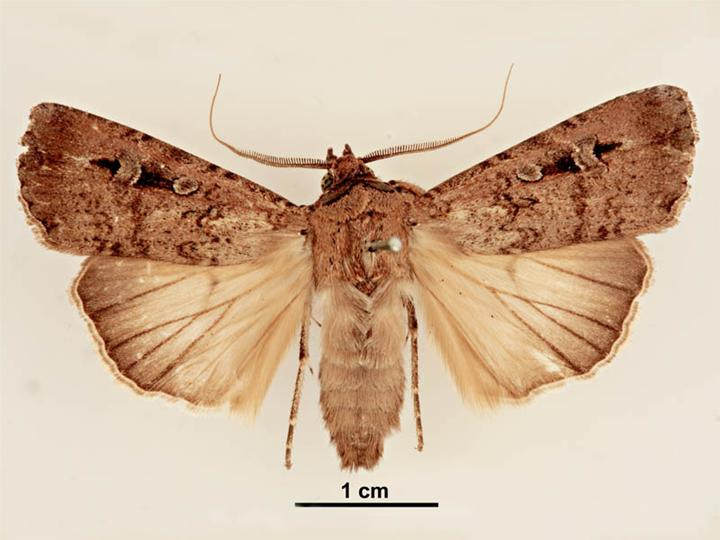
Male dorsal view

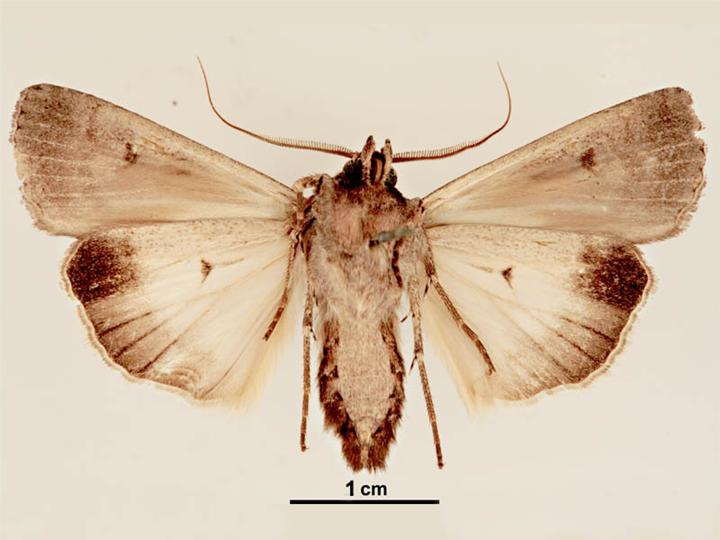
Male ventral view

== Behaviour ==
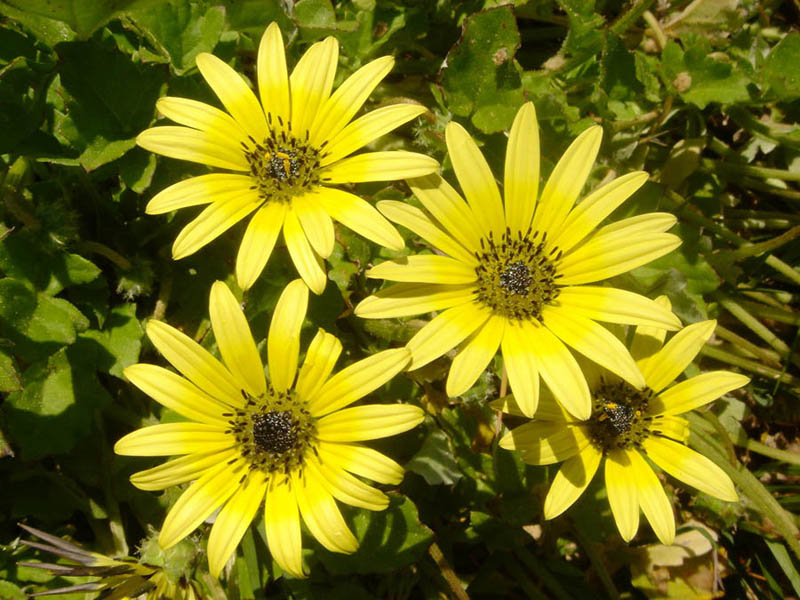
Capeweed, one of the larval host plants of the bogong moth

=== Food resources ===
Bogong moth larvae subsist on winter pasture crops and wild crop weeds such as cape weeds within bogong moth breeding grounds, primarily depending on annual dicotyledons that grow during the winter. Attacks on a wide variety of cultivated crops have been seen, with plants such as Medicago species, wheat, cabbages, cauliflowers, silver beet, peas, and potatoes all recorded being consumed by bogong moth caterpillars. However, the larvae avoid grasses, which overtake pastures during the summer, making summer unfavourable due to lack of larval food sources. Adult bogong moths feed on the nectar of flowers such as Epacris, Grevillea and Eucalyptus while breeding or migrating, but will not actively feed during aestivation.

=== Migration ===
Bogong moths undergo whole scale long-distance migration biannually, in which they can travel up to 965 km (600 miles). The spring migration begins in early September and occurs from the lowlands of Southern Australia south towards the Australian Alps for purposes of reaching aestivation sites. During the summer, the moths remain in their aestivation sites until autumn, when they migrate back towards the breeding grounds of the lowlands as early as February, but primarily in April. The bogong moth utilises particular aestivation sites repeatedly throughout migrations, as seen with the development of parasites that depend on the regular arrival and departure of the moths from caves. The population within each aestivation site fluctuates throughout the summer due to moth mortality and the departure and arrival of moths either migrating further south for aestivation or north to return to breeding grounds. However, this differs from changes during migration periods, when the populations rapidly increase with arrival or decrease with departure.

Bogong moths are nocturnal migrants, but the exact mechanism for long-distance navigation is not clear. It is possible that they are oriented by light, as seen in the influence of light intensity on activity during aestivation. Additionally, bogong moths may use an internal magnetic compass to aid in navigation, as seen in the similar monarch butterfly. A study published in 2018 concluded that the bogong moth uses a combination of the Earth's magnetic field and recognisable landmarks to calibrate their route. In 2025, researchers found that neurons in these insects responded to a starry sky, and suggested bogong moths use both magnetic fields and stars to orient themselves and navigate.

However, there are also nonmigratory populations; this generally occurs in areas with favourable conditions, where migration to avoid harsh conditions such as seasonal changes in larval food crop abundance is not necessary. Some populations of bogong moths in areas such as Tasmania and in coastal populations of New South Wales do not migrate, and reach sexual maturity at a faster rate than migratory populations.

=== Social aggregation ===
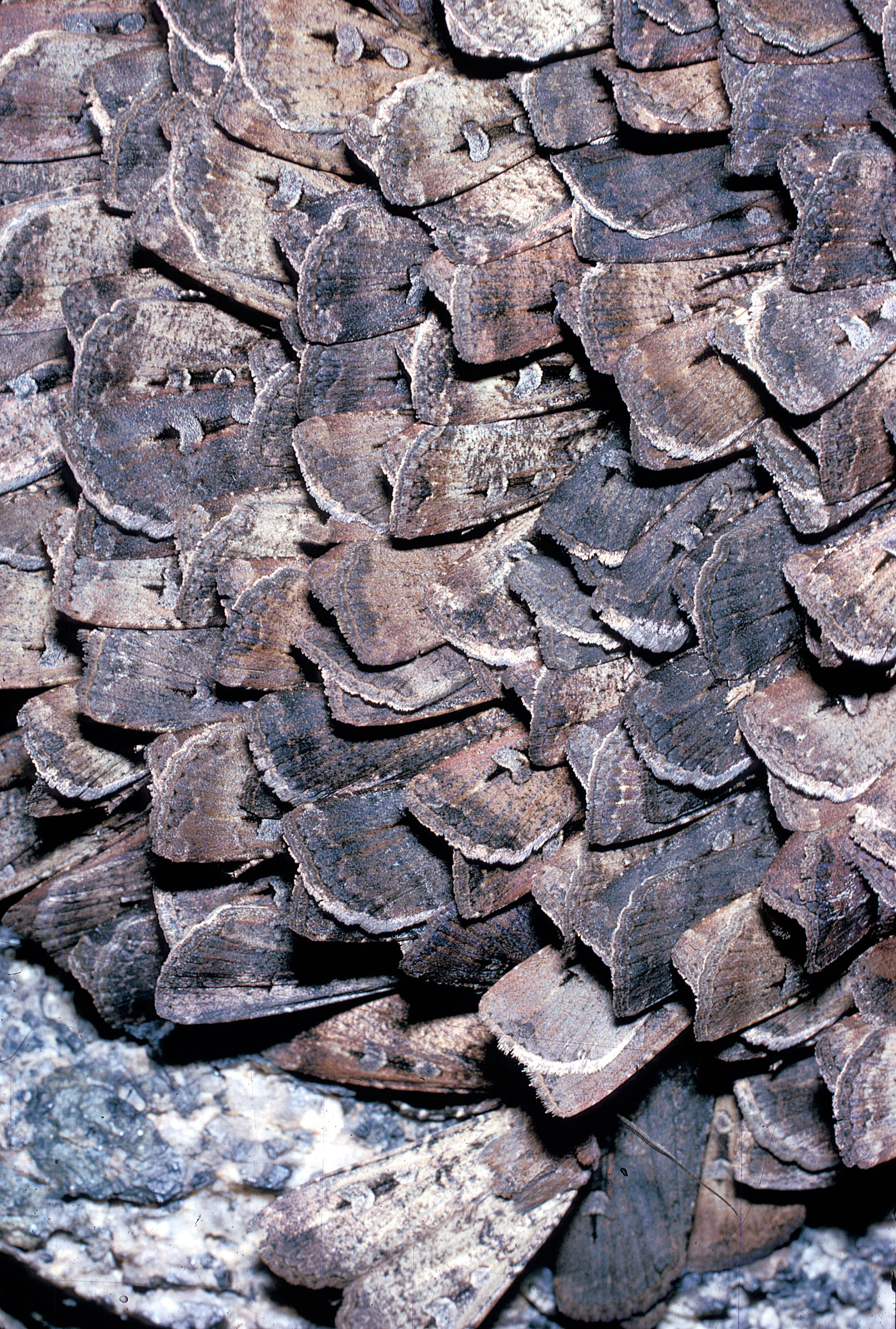
Gregarious aggregation of bogong moths during aestivation

During the spring migration, bogong moths gregariously aggregate with densities reaching 17,000 moths per square metre (10.8 square feet) within caves, crevices, and other areas hidden from the sunlight. The lack of light and relatively constant temperature and humidity makes these spots favourable during aestivation. The first moths that arrive occupy the deepest and darkest locations, using their fore tarsi to grip onto the rock faces, and aggregations form around these initial areas, with moths arriving later settling for less ideal areas with more sunlight, higher temperatures, and decreased humidity. To diminish the amount of light that reaches their light-sensitive eyes, later moths push themselves underneath the wings and abdomens of moths that arrived earlier and place their hind legs on top of the moths beneath them. This physical contact and aggregation allow the moths to retain body moisture. When the aestivating moths are disturbed, the moths within the area of disturbance briefly spread out and leave the aggregation, dropping excrement when unsettled before quickly returning to the aggregation and re-positioning themselves.

While the moths mostly remain dormant during aestivation, there are some periods of activity within the aggregation which are correlated to changes in light intensity. During dawn and dusk, portions of the population become active, first crawling around and spreading out, and then flying out of their shelter into the open. While some water drinking has been observed, no evidence of copulation or active foraging has been found during these periods of activity.

=== Diapause ===
Facultative diapause, an optional period of delayed development in response to environmental conditions, accompanies the biannual migration of the bogong moths. While one generation of moths goes through the two migrations each year, multiple generations are possible in favourable conditions and higher temperatures, as growth across all life stages can occur faster. For example, without the diapause, the bogong moth would normally complete sexual maturation within 50 days. However, this maturation is delayed due to the lack of larval food sources during the summer season. During the summer, hot temperatures occur and grasses, which are an unfavourable diet for bogong moth larvae, overtake pastures and make up the majority of the plants occupying the pastures. Bogong moths avoid this harsh environment by delaying development during the summer so that their eggs do not hatch in a poorly-suited environment; instead, they migrate to cooler, more suitable areas and delay their development during aestivation until the winter season, when they return to the breeding grounds and winter pasture crops begin to grow again. During aestivation, the bogong moths remain dormant for several months, possibly delaying development due to the lower temperatures. The food they consume during the migration is also dedicated to building fat reserves for aestivation rather than development, as bogong moths must consume more food during the autumn migration before maturation and mating. However, in areas with favourable conditions, bogong moths do not have to migrate during the summer.

== Ecology ==
=== Enemies ===
==== Predators ====
The bogong moth suffers from predation during both its migration and aestivation. During the spring and autumn migrations, several species of birds, mammals, and even fish have been recorded preying on the moth. Little raven, currawong and Australian pipit congregations form to feast on bogong moths as they travel from aestivation sites during migration. Aboriginal people also travelled to aestivation sites to feast on the dormant moths, and may have searched for these bird congregations to locate these sites. Bats also attack the moths during active flight periods during the dusk, and foxes, bush rats, and dusky antechinus have been recorded eating moths. Of the mammals that prey on the bogong moth, the endangered mountain pygmy-possum is the most reliant on bogong moths as a source of food.

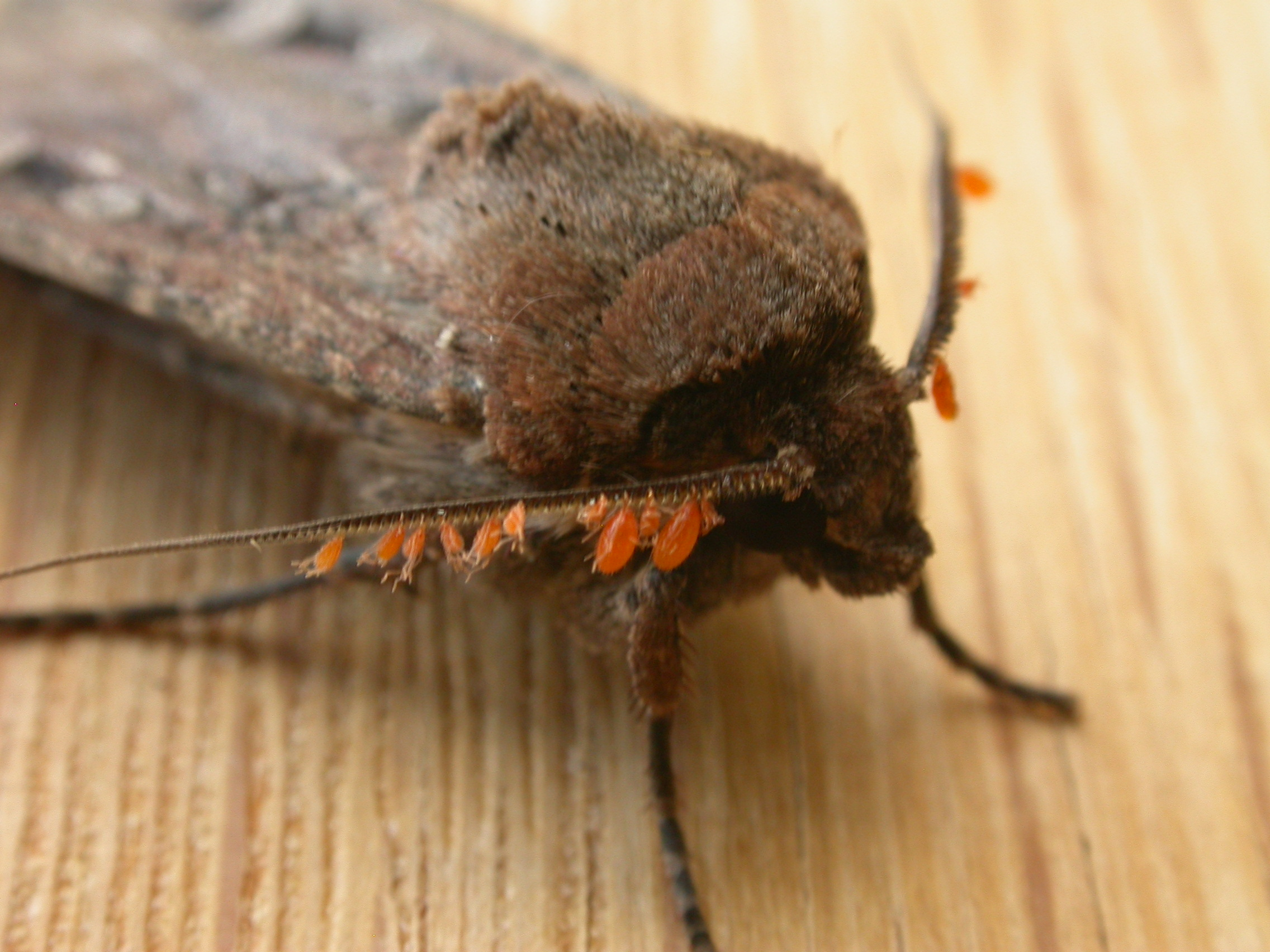
Parasites on the antennae of an adult moth

==== Parasites ====
Two species of mermithid nematodes parasitise the bogong moth during its aestivation: Amphimermis bogongae and Hexamermis cavicola. The parasites are transmitted to bogong moths through water; the early instar larval nematodes reside in the debris of the cave floors of common aestivation sites, and crawl up to reach the moths through trickles of water coming down the walls. Bogong moths are infected upon their arrival within the caves once they drink the water. After a few months, the larval nematodes emerge from the moths, which causes the moth to die, and burrow into the cave floor, where they mature and lay eggs over the winter and wait for the next spring migration of the moths. The nematodes are unusual in that they parasitise adult bogong moths instead of the more commonly utilised larval host stage. The nematodes' life cycles demonstrate an adaptation to the migration of the bogong moths, as they are dependent on bogong moths returning to the same aestivation sites.

=== Biovector of arsenic ===
Concerns have been raised over the potential role of agriculture in turning the bogong moth into a biovector of arsenic in the Australian Alps. Aggregations of bogong moths in aestivation sites has led to the bioaccumulation of the pollutant in both the surrounding local environment and within predators, particularly in the endangered mountain pygmy possum. However, no conclusive evidence has directly linked agriculture as the source of arsenic in bogong moths.

In 2001, a few months after rainfall had washed out debris consisting of dead moths from within the cave, the complete death of local grasses was seen outside of an aestivation site of the bogong moth. Investigation into the causes of the grass mortality showed that the concentration of arsenic in the surrounding areas was much higher than normal, and the source was determined to be the bogong moths. Since the bogong moths do not feed at their aestivation sites, they had absorbed arsenic from lowland feeding sites as larvae and subsequently transported it over long distances into the mountains. Bioaccumulation, the absorption and accumulation of substances by organisms, occurs with arsenic in bogong moths. While levels within each individual moth are small, the sheer quantity of moths in the area led to a concentration of the pollutant to damaging levels in the environment. The presence of arsenic has also been shown in the feces of mammals such as the mountain pygmy-possum, demonstrating the bioaccumulation of this pollutant in animals. While no source has been determined, concerns have been raised over the possible role of agriculture in the bioaccumulation of arsenic due to its presence in historically and presently-used insecticides. This has led to the discontinued use of insecticides in controlling the bogong moth in urban areas, in favour of less intrusive methods.

=== Decline in numbers ===
In the spring/summer aestivation seasons of 2017–18 and 2018–19, dramatic drops in numbers of the moths in the Alpine caves have been observed. Millions of the moths have usually lined the walls of these caves over summer, but for the 2017–18 and 2018–19 aestivation seasons there were none in some caves, according to Professor Eric Warrant of Lund University in Sweden. He says that the drop in numbers was probably caused by a lack of rainfall due to winter drought in their breeding areas and climate change, the lack of rain producing insufficient vegetation to feed the caterpillars. Some caves still harboured thousands of moths, which suggested that the moths "came from different breeding grounds, where one location wasn't as badly affected by the drought as the other. I don't think they will disappear completely, but there's certainly a possibility that they could become locally extinct at their breeding grounds", Warrant said.

Other biologists and ecologists have pointed to the dramatic effect on animals which feed on the moths, which are an important source of protein for wildlife, including the threatened mountain pygmy possum as well as other insectivorous mammals and birds. "The vulnerability of the Australian Alps to climate change is the worst in the world because we've got these short little mountains so when it gets warmer, there is nowhere for these cold-adapted species to go", according to Euan Ritchie, a wildlife ecologist at Deakin University.

=== 2026 rebound ===
In 2026 the number of citizen science sightings increased significantly across Eastern Australia. This made some biologists hopeful about the species future, while noting that the underlying climate pressures are still present.

== Interactions with humans ==
=== Food source ===
Bogong moths were historically used as a food source by Aboriginal peoples located in South-eastern Australia. Groups would travel to the area towards the summits of mountains to harvest moths, where they also met with other Aboriginal peoples, fostering inter-tribal relations as people gathered and feasted during these harvests. They would go into the caves and scrape aestivating moths off the walls into nets and dishes using sticks. Once gathered, the moths would be roasted to remove the scales and wings and then either eaten immediately or ground into a paste and made into "moth meat" cakes that would last and could be taken home. The moth was said to have a nice nutty flavour that was most similar to walnuts or almonds. The bogong moth is an icon of Australian wildlife due to this historical role as an important food source and as an inter-tribal gathering point in Southeastern Australia.

An excavation of Cloggs Cave, near Buchan in Victoria, revealed microscopic remains of moth on a small grinding stone, estimated to be about 2,000 years old. This is the first confirmed evidence of insect food remains discovered on a stone artefact in the whole world. The Gunaikurnai people were one of the peoples who used to travel to the mountains to obtain the high-fat, energy-rich food, and stories of these travels had been passed down in their oral history. The excavation was done by researchers from Monash University in collaboration with the traditional owners, represented by the Gunaikurnai Land and Waters Corporation (GLaWAC).

=== Pest of crop plants ===
Bogong moths have had a role in damaging crop plants since winter pastures serve as breeding grounds and larval food sources. Outbreaks of caterpillars have been recorded across New South Wales, with damage primarily done to heavy black soil flats. Medicago species, wheat, cabbages, cauliflowers, silver beet, peas, and potatoes have been recorded as being attacked by bogong moth larvae.

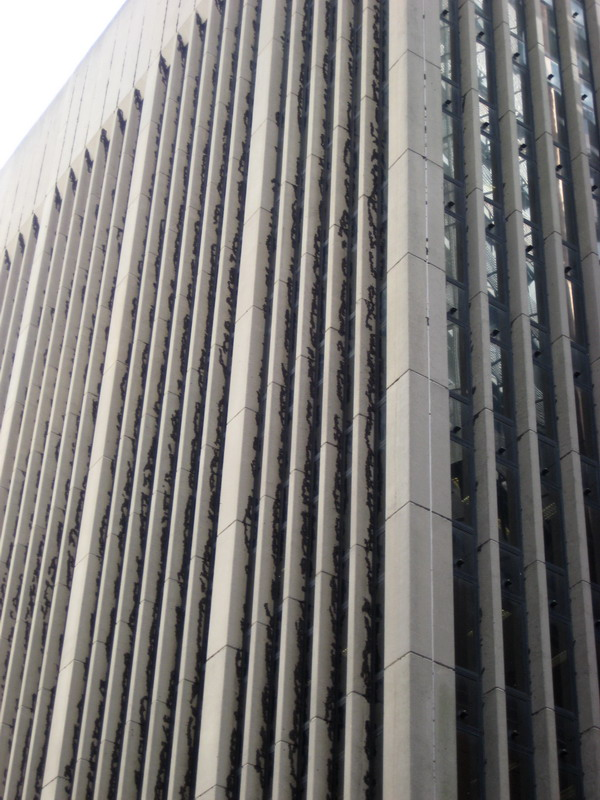
Bogong moths in Sydney, aggregating in the crevices of a building.

==== Control ====
The bogong moth is a minor and irregular pest of crop plants in Australia. This makes it difficult to predict their pattern and control. Typically, control of this species is not cost-effective. However, if there are heavy damaging outbreaks of the bogong moth, insecticide is applied to the crops that are affected by it.

=== Migration issues ===
Millions of bogong moths have been blown off course from their spring migration into major cities like Canberra, Melbourne, and Sydney due to strong winds, with notable instances of bogong moth invasions including the 2000 Olympics in Sydney. The large amount of light and noise present can also attract moths towards cities. Parliament House in Canberra, present in the middle of the bogong moth flight path during migrations, was notably susceptible to moths. Light pollution from the building traps them during their flight and encourages the moth to find shelter within crevices, shadows, and sometimes even the insides of the buildings during the light and heat of the day. Efforts have been made to try and drive the moths out by turning off lights, covering attractive corners and pathways indoors, and using insecticides. However, insecticide use has ceased in urban areas due to concerns over environmental consequences.

== Conservation status ==
In December 2021 the bogong moth was added to the IUCN Red List as an endangered species, based on a February 2021 assessment. It was listed due the rapid warming of the Australian Alps, its summer migration destination, shrinking its habitat.
