= Gippsland languages =

Pama–Nyungan subfamily of southeastern Australia

Gippsland
- Geographic distribution: Gippsland, New South Wales
- Linguistic classification: Pama–Nyungan: Southeastern; Victorian; Eastern Victoria; Gippsland
- Subdivisions: Gaanay (Kurnai); Dhudhuroa; Pallanganmiddang †

Language codes
- Glottolog: None gana1268 (Birrdhawal) dhud1237 (Dhudhuroa–Pallanganmiddang)
- Gippsland languages (green) among other Pama–Nyungan (tan). The section on the coast is Gaanay.

The Gippsland languages are a family of Pama–Nyungan languages of Australia. They were spoken in the Gippsland region, the southernmost part of mainland Australia, on the Bass Strait. There are three rather distant branches; these are often considered single languages, though the dialects of Gaanay are sometimes counted separately:

- Gippsland
  - Gaanay (Kurnai)
    - Muk-thang
    - Nulit
    - Thangquai
    - Bidhawal
  - Dhudhuroa
  - Pallanganmiddang

All but Kurnai are now extinct. The Gippsland languages, especially Gaanay, have phonotactics that are unusual for mainland Australian languages, but characteristic of Tasmanian languages.
