= Pallanganmiddang language =

Extinct Pama–Nyungan language of southeastern Australia

Pallanganmiddang
- Waywurru, Waveroo
- Native to: Australia
- Region: Victoria
- Ethnicity: Pallanganmiddang people
- Extinct: 19th century
- Language family: Pama–Nyungan: Gippsland; Pallanganmiddang

Language codes
- ISO 639-3: pmd
- Glottolog: pall1243
- AIATSIS: S89
- Location of Waywurru / Pallanganmiddang Country in Victoria

Pallanganmiddang (Waywurru, Waveroo) is an extinct, poorly-attested Aboriginal language of the Upper Murray region of the northeast of Victoria, that was spoken by the Pallanganmiddang people.

== Name ==
Many tribe and language names in the area end in a suffix variously spelt -matong, -middang, -mirttong, -mathang, and -mittung; this suffix may have an etymological association with "speech" or "tongue" (compare Western Australian language Kalaamaya's midhany "tongue", likely a cognate), and, in Pallanganmiddang's case, seems to denote an ethnonym.

Pallanganmiddang has been alternatively known as Balangamida, Pallangahmiddang, Pal-ler an mitter, Wavaroo, Wave Veroo, Waveroo, Wayyourong, Wayyouroo, Wayerroo, Waywurru, Weeerroo and Weeherroo.

== Classification ==
Although it was a Pama-Nyungan language, Pallanganmiddang was evidently quite distinct from its neighbouring languages, such as Dhudhuroa, Yorta Yorta and Wiradjuri; its percentage of shared vocabulary with these neighbours is very low. The only exception is the language mentioned in an 1899 list titled "Barwidgee, Upper Murray", with which Pallanganmiddang shares 39% of its vocabulary. This source may actually show a dialect of Dhudhuroa spoken near the border of Pallanganmiddang territory, or it may be conflating two languages, although the list's use of words not native to the area suggests its lack of reliability.

Despite its seeming lack of closeness to neighbouring languages, Pallanganmiddang does contain many roots familiar in Aboriginal languages such as nha- "to see", and yan- "to go".

== Documentation ==
There are only four primary source documents on the language: a vocabulary of 46 words from 1878 and a vocabulary of 109 words from 1886, a vocabulary of 341 words of unclear date, and a vocabulary of 63 words from 1900, which, taken together, provide a list of more than 300 words.

== Phonology ==
=== Consonants ===
The consonant inventory was probably the same as in neighbouring languages. The following table shows the maximum inventory, with sounds not directly attested being shown in brackets:

Consonantal inventory
	Labial	Alveolar	Retroflex	Dental	Palatal	Velar
Stop	p/b	t/d	ʈ/ɖ	t̪/d̪	c/ɟ	k/ɡ
Nasal	m	n	(ɳ)	(n̪)	ɲ	ŋ
Lateral		l	(ɭ)	(l̪)	(ʎ)	
Rhotic		r				
Approximant	w				j	

- The variation between p/b, t/d, and k/g in the sources suggest a lack of phonemic distinction between voiced and voiceless consonants.
- There was probably not a phonemic distinction between dentals and palatals, since some words are recorded with both t/d, suggesting a dental or alveolar plosive, and j/g, suggesting a palatal plosive (e.g. "foot" is variously spelt teerrer or gerra, "man" is variously spelt teerre, gerree or jere).
- There is no definite evidence for retroflexes, but the spelling of carrda "crayfish" suggests they existed.
- There probably was a distinction between a flapped or trilled rhotic, and a glide-type rhotic (possibly a retroflex), but such distinctions were not made in older sources.

The following table shows consonants in both initial and intervocalic form; note the differences between the voiced and voiceless plosives:

Initial and intervocalic consonants
	Initial	Medial
p/b	pada "big"	kabiga "baby"
t/d	taka "hit"^{[A]}	madega "old man"
rt/rd	?	karda "crayfish"
th/dh	thirriwa "nails"	bathawatha "cold"
tj/dj	djuyu "snake"	budju "kangaroo"
k/g	kima "kangaroo rat"	bugu "bowels"
m	merri "ground"	marrimuna "lazy"
n	narra "wild dog"	mani "camp"
rn	?	?
nh	nhagadi "see"^{[B]}	?
ny	nyuma "rain"	noganya "give"
ng	ngaa "nose"	?
l	—	ngalawiya "wood duck"
rr	—	karri "wind"
y	yarra "beard"	payorro "magpie"
w	warra "water"	wawa "brother"

^{A} The alveolar initial is assumed here based on a cognate.
^{B} The dental initial is assumed here based on various cognates.

Only 7 words ending with consonants have been recorded (the word wugug is suspicious, however, as wowwer is also recorded and wugug is documented for another language in Victoria). Three of these words occur in another form (or similar word) ending in a vowel; even bab "mother" may have had the alternate form bab-ga, based on mam-ga "father". It seems likely Pallanganmiddang did not allow final consonants.

Pallanganmiddang	English
wugug	elder brother
worungun	cord
karrin	laugh
bab	mother
tueyon (also ju-u)	snake
youllon (also ulo)	finger, toe
bunjun (compare punjoo "road")	track of a foot

==== Consonant clusters ====
Pallanganmiddang contained homorganic nasal-plosive consonantal clusters. There were also heterorganic clusters, some of which went across morpheme boundaries such as -mg- in mam-ga "father".

Homorganic clusters
Cluster	English
mb	bamba "a fly"
nd	purranda "bad"
rnd	?
ndh	berrontha "crow"
ndj	pandju "road"
ngg	pungga "stone"

Heterorganic clusters
Cluster	English
nb	winbinbi "sun"
ngb	narrangba "you're a bad boy"
md	wimda "spear"
mg	mamga "father"
lg	belgamba "shield"
nrr	mobenrru "bushman"
nm	tonmana "gammon", "tell a lie"

=== Vowels ===
Pallanganmiddang may have had only three vowels /i/, /u/ and /a/, similar to many Aboriginal languages, although the exact amount is unclear. Nonetheless, according to different sources, a, e, i, o, and u are all used. There may have been a distinction between long and short vowels, as suggested by the spelling in the first syllable of karmborro "group", but this is unclear.

There may have been no phonemic distinction between u and o, as suggested by variant spellings, such as koro and kurru "blood".

Monosyllabic words with no final consonant seemingly contained a long vowel (e.g. mii "eye", ngaa "nose"), a feature common in Aboriginal languages.

=== Sound correspondences ===
Robert M.W Dixon, in his notes, claimed that there seems to be evidence of sound correspondence between Pallanganmiddang and its neighbouring languages. See this list:

English	Pallanganmiddang	Neighbouring languages
ear	marramba	marlamboa (Dhudhuroa)
tongue	dharra	dhalayn (widespread)
water	warra	wala (Yorta Yorta) wallung "rain" (Ngarigo)
wedge-tailed eagle	warrimu	wanumarru (Dhudhuroa)
excrement	gurra	guna (widespread)
foot	djirra	djina (widespread)
head	buwa	buka (Yorta Yorta)
dogh	bowa, bawa	baka (Yorta Yorta)

== Grammar ==
No primary source data are available for Pallanganmiddang's grammar. However, there are short sentences included in the collected vocabulary lists, although it is difficult to glean much information from them.

=== Pronouns ===
The forms innar and neibee are both recorded for "you". Another word, ninna, although given as "I", could possibly be a variant of innar. If spelled ngina (as the initial velar nasal may have been unheard), it matches a word meaning "you" in Yorta Yorta and Latji-Latji.

Itebe is recorded for "I". This could have been pronounced something like ngaytbi, and so neibee, although given as "you", could perhaps be a first-person pronoun. In fact, neibee seems to match the final two syllables in bang(g)owonabi (translated as "hungry"), waurranmandjianabi (translated as "thirsty") and kanimanabi (translated as "drink"), possibly meaning "I'm hungry", "I'm thirsty", and "I drink".

Nyeende-nanga-durrah is recorded for "me", and nyeende for "my". However, a velar nasal, rather than the implied palatal nasal from the spelling, is more typical for first person pronouns in languages in the area. This could suggest they are possibly misglossed and are actually second person pronouns; alternatively, a sound change could have occurred, or the text could be erroneous.

One wordlist records wowandowan for "hungry"; since wan means "I" in several other languages in Victoria, this possibly suggests a translation of wowandowan as "I'm hungry" and therefore wan as a bound first-person pronoun (and the previously mentioned ngina, etc. as the free form).

=== Morphology ===
There probably was a suffix -ntha (in neighbouring language Dhudhuroa, -ntha occurred as a second person subject bound pronoun):

Pallanganmiddang	English
minyi-wayantha	answer
bobintha	burn
tagalitantha	eat
tang(g)rrintha	lame (in leg)
puthanda	sulky

The suffix -gu can be found on verbs (in other languages of Victoria, this is a plural imperative or a dative-purposive marking a purposive or infinitive verb):

Pallanganmiddang	English
yayi yani-gu	come
yayi yan-di-gu	fetch it
tuta-gu	catch
taka-gu	kill
maynde-gu?	take it

Many verbs end in either -ti or -thi:

Pallanganmiddang	English
taka-thi	eat
popa-ti	jump
yaga-thi	swim
yawa-ti	talk
kibi-thi	sing

-dali appears in some words:

Pallanganmiddang	English
kudji-dali (also given as kudjina)	cry
padadi-dali	dance
pewu-dali	ready to fight
tagurra wurrima-dali	wash

-bi appears in some words:

Pallanganmiddang	English
towadad-bi	fight
wurrarragurra-bi	lose the way
yana-bi?	walk

-na appears to be a suffix, appearing on nouns, verbs, and forms of uncertain word class. This may actually represent two suffixes, the distinction unheard by the documenters.

Pallanganmiddang	English
taka-na (compare taka-ku "kill")	beat
ton-ma-na	gammon, tell a lie
kudji-na (also given as kudjidali)	cry
yarra-na (also given as yarra)	beard

Some nouns referring to humans end in -ga:

Pallanganmiddang	English
yuwarriga (compare yuwarru "young man")	daughter
djerriga (compare djerri "man", "woman")	old woman
mamga (also given as mama)	father

-di was possibly a causative suffix; compare the translations of "come" and "fetch it":

Pallanganmiddang	English
yayi yani-gu	come
yayi yan-di-gu	fetch it

== Vocabulary ==
The following table contains a list of selected vocabulary from Pallanganmiddang:

Pallanganmiddang	English
(ng)ina	you
noga	that
pulithap, pulido	two
pada	big
djerri	man
karrewa	fish
marrega	bird
bawa	dog
wonda	tree
waarri	bark
wada	skin
kurru	blood
buwa, boya	egg
buwa	head
marramba	ear
mii	eye
tagadhi	eat
nhaga-	see
ngurrangurra	sleep
barridjarra	die
taga-	kill
yakathi	swim
yan-	walk
yayiyani-	come
tanade, tandathi	stand up
bathawatha, bawatha	cold
murnang-djitaming(g)a	full
kayangi (-dji?)	good
