= Robert Hamilton Mathews =

Australian anthropologist and linguist (1841-1918)

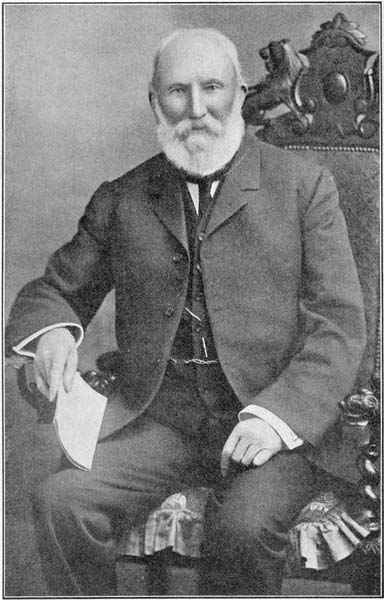
R H Mathews

Robert Hamilton Mathews (1841–1918) was an Australian surveyor and self-taught anthropologist who studied the Aboriginal cultures of Australia, especially those of Victoria, New South Wales and southern Queensland. He was a member of the Royal Society of New South Wales and a corresponding member of the Anthropological Institute of London (later the Royal Anthropological Institute).

Mathews had no academic qualifications and received no university backing for his research. Mathews supported himself and his family from investments made during his lucrative career as a licensed surveyor. He was in his early fifties when he began the investigations of Aboriginal society that would dominate the last 25 years of his life. During this period he published 171 works of anthropology running to approximately 2200 pages. Mathews enjoyed friendly relations with Aboriginal communities in many parts of south-east Australia.

Marginalia in a book owned by Mathews suggest that Aboriginal people gave him the nickname Birrarak, a term used in the Gippsland region of Victoria to describe persons who communicated with the spirits of the deceased, from whom they learned dances and songs.

Mathews won some support for his studies outside Australia. Edwin Sidney Hartland, Arnold van Gennep and Andrew Lang were among his admirers. Lang regarded him as the most lucid and "well informed writer on the various divisions which regulate the marriages of the Australian tribes." Despite endorsement abroad, Mathews was an isolated and maligned figure in his own country. Within the small and competitive anthropological scene in Australia his work was disputed and he fell into conflict with some prominent contemporaries, particularly Walter Baldwin Spencer and Alfred William Howitt. This affected Mathews' reputation and his contribution as a founder of Australian anthropology has until recently been recognised only among specialists in Aboriginal studies. In 1987 Mathews' notebooks and original papers were donated to the National Library of Australia by his granddaughter-in-law Janet Mathews. The availability of the Robert Hamilton Mathews papers has allowed greater understanding of his working methods and opened access to significant data that were never published. Mathews' work is now used as a resource by anthropologists, archaeologists, historians, linguists, heritage consultants and by members of descendant Aboriginal communities.

== Family background ==
Robert Hamilton Mathews was the third of five children in a family of Irish Protestants. His elder siblings Jane and William were born in Ulster before the family's flight from Ireland in 1839. Robert and his younger sisters Matilda and Annie were born in New South Wales. Before they emigrated, Mathews' father, William Mathews (1798–1866), was the principal co-proprietor of Lettermuck Mill, a small papermaking business near the village of Claudy in County Londonderry. The other partners were his three brothers, Robert, Hamilton and Samuel Mathews. When first established by Robert's grandfather (also named William Mathews), Lettermuck was a successful business. Changes in papermaking technology, combined with the introduction of the Paper Excise to Ireland in 1798, adversely affected profitability. Many Irish papermakers made efforts to evade the tax on paper and the Mathews family became "notorious for crimes against the Excise". They were regularly summoned before the Court of the Exchequer to answer charges of avoidance. Between 1820 and 1826 penalties of £3,300 were imposed on William Mathews, none of which he paid.

Hostile relations developed between the Mathewses and the Excise officers who regularly inspected their business. In 1833 an Excise officer named James Lampen disappeared, having last been seen entering the Lettermuck premises. A witness heard the discharge of a firearm according to a newspaper report. In March 1833 Robert's father, William Mathews, his three uncles and a journeyman employed in the mill were arrested for Lampen's murder. They were incarcerated until May that year when the charges were dropped, reportedly because of the disappearance of a key witness and the failure to find a body, despite a substantial search. It was believed within and outside the Excise office that the Mathewses were guilty of murder. From the time of the brothers' release, Excise officers, protected by an armed guard, monitored the mill around the clock. Prevented from trading illegally, the business collapsed and eventually all the brothers emigrated to various destinations. In later years, bodies were exhumed from bog near the mill, thought to belong to Lampen and an itinerant worker in the paper industry. This raises the possibility that R. H. Mathews' father and uncles were involved in a double homicide.

Penniless after the collapse of the business, William Mathews and his wife Jane (née Holmes) falsified their ages so as to qualify for assisted migration to New South Wales. In the company of R. H. Mathews' two elder siblings, they arrived in Sydney on the Westminster in early 1840. William Mathews found labouring work for the family of John Macarthur at Camden, New South Wales and shepherded at another of their properties, Richlands near Taralga. They seem to have been itinerant for some years. R. H. Mathews was born at Narellan, southwest of Sydney, on 21 April 1841. The family's fortunes improved when they acquired a farm of 220 acres (89 ha) at Mutbilly near the present village of Breadalbane, New South Wales in the Southern Tablelands. Goulburn is the nearest city.

== Early life ==
In explaining his success in working with Aboriginal people, Mathews claimed that "black children were among my earliest playmates". This could refer to the family's time at Richlands where William Mathews worked as a shepherd, as did several Aboriginal men from the area. At Mutbilly the family lived on territory that R. H. Mathews later identified as the traditional country of the Gandangara people (also spelled Gundungurra). Mathews' father was, according to his grandson William Washington Mathews, a "broken man" by the time they settled at Mutbilly. He had sectarian disputes with Roman Catholic neighbours and was several times prosecuted for minor assaults against them. R. H. Mathews and his younger siblings were educated by his father and at times by a private tutor.

Occasional visits by large survey teams inspired Mathews' interest in his future profession. After his father's death in 1866, he became an assistant to surveyor John W. Deering in 1866–67. He later trained with surveyors Thomas Kennedy and George Jamieson and in 1870 he passed the government-run examination to become a licensed surveyor.

== Career as a surveyor ==
As a licensed surveyor in colonial New South Wales, Mathews was entitled to do government work that fell within his assigned district while also maintaining a private practice. His earnings were considerable, and rapidly eclipsed the salary of the colony's Surveyor-General. In the 1870s Mathews was posted successively to the districts of Deepwater, New South Wales, Goondiwindi and Biamble. In 1880 he was posted to Singleton, New South Wales in the Hunter Region. As a surveyor he had many opportunities to meet Aboriginal people and he employed at least one, the Kamilaroi man Jimmy Nerang, in his survey team. Mathews joined the Royal Society of New South Wales in 1875 but never published in the society's journal until he took up anthropology in 1893. Private correspondence shows that he collected some linguistic data and artefacts during his early days as a surveyor.

Mathews married Mary Sylvester Bartlett of Tamworth in 1872. They had seven children, two of whom became prominent later in life. Their first-born Hamilton Bartlett Mathews (1873–1959) served as Surveyor-General of New South Wales. Gregory Macalister Mathews CBE, FRSE (1876–1949), their third child, won international renown as an ornithologist. He donated his outstanding collection of Australian books to the National Library of Australia. His collection of bird skins, sold to Walter Rothschild, 2nd Baron Rothschild in the 1920s, is in the American Museum of Natural History, New York City.

After two years in Singleton Mathews resigned from his post as a licensed surveyor. From that time his surveying was confined to a part-time practice. From May 1882 until March 1883 Robert and Mary made a world tour, visiting the United States, Britain and possibly Europe. In Ireland, Mathews visited his parents' village of Claudy, seemingly unaware that his father had been suspected of involvement in the murder of James Lampen.

== Legal career ==
Mathews was appointed a justice of the peace for the colonies of Queensland and South Australia in 1875 and for New South Wales in 1883.

This allowed him to serve as a magistrate in local courts. He did this regularly after he moved to Singleton where he also served as district coroner. This experience inspired his first publication, Handbook to Magisterial Inquiries in New South Wales: Being a Practical Guide for Justices of the Peace in Holding Inquiries in Lieu of Inquests (1888).

When Mathews became interested in anthropology, he found his status as a magistrate advantageous. Contacts in the police force supplied information on Aboriginal ceremonies while others informed him about the location of potential informants or collected data on his behalf.

Mathews' coronial work exposed him to the sufferings of Aboriginal people in the districts around Singleton. He officiated at the magisterial inquiry into the death of a Singleton Aborigine known as Dick who died of malnutrition and exposure in 1886. James S. White, the minister of the Singleton Presbyterian Church where Mathews worshipped, was an active campaigner for Aboriginal rights. Mathews was friendly with White, but never became a political agitator, preferring instead to document the complexity of Aboriginal culture. In 1889 the Mathews family moved from Singleton to Parramatta in western Sydney where his sons attended The King's School, Parramatta.

== Contribution to anthropology ==
In early 1892 Mathews returned to the Hunter Valley to survey a pastoral property near the hamlet of Milbrodale, New South Wales. A worker on the property pointed out a rock shelter where a large man-like figure had been painted by Aboriginal artists. Mathews measured and drew the painting and documented hand stencils in other caves in the vicinity. From these observations he prepared a paper that he read before the Royal Society of New South Wales and subsequently published in the 1893 volume of the Journal and Proceedings of the Royal Society of New South Wales. He identified the human figure as a depiction of the ancestral being, Baiame (also spelled Baiamai and Baiami). The encounter with the Baiame site, and the favourable reception of Mathews' paper by the Royal Society of New South Wales, marked a turning point in his career. His biographer, the Australian historian Martin Thomas, describes it as the onset of his "ethnomania". Mathews was further encouraged when he prepared a long paper on Sydney rock art which was awarded the Royal Society's Bronze Medal essay prize for 1894.

From this time, Mathews became a fanatical student of Aboriginal society. He familiarised himself with the fledgling discipline of anthropology by studying in the library of the Royal Society of New South Wales which exchanged publications with 400 other scholarly and scientific institutes around the world. He also studied at the Public Library in Sydney (now the State Library of New South Wales). Mathews' work would now be classified as social or cultural anthropology. He did not practise physical anthropology or collect human remains.

In addition to documentation of rock art, which appears in 23 published papers, Mathews published on the following themes: kinship and marriage rules; male initiation; mythology; and linguistics. He capitalised on the considerable international interest in Aboriginal Australians in the Victorian and Edwardian periods. His reports were read and cited by major social scientists including Émile Durkheim and van Gennep. Apart from a few short books and booklets, Mathews published almost entirely in learned journals, including Journal of the Anthropological Institute, American Anthropologist, American Antiquarian, Bulletins et Mémoires de la Société d'Anthropologie de Paris, and Mitteilungen der Anthropologischen Gesellschaft. In addition to these specialist anthropological journals, he published in general scientific periodicals including Proceedings of the American Philosophical Society and the journals of various Australian royal societies including the Royal Australasian Geographical Society (Queensland Branch).

Mathews gathered information by forging links with Aboriginal communities that he visited in person. This was his preferred method of data collection, and he criticised Howitt and Lorimer Fison for "not having gone out among the blacks themselves in all cases." However, Mathews' personal investigations were confined to southeast Australia while his publications concerned all Australian colonies (states from 1901) except Tasmania. When writing about areas he could not personally visit, he used data supplied by rural settlers whom he persuaded to collect information according to his instructions. The R. H. Mathews Papers contain many examples of this incoming correspondence.

=== Kinship and marriage rules ===
Of Mathews' 171 publications, 71 are to do with Aboriginal kinship, totems or the rules of marriage. His first publication on kinship was read before the Queensland branch of the Royal Geographical Society of Australasia in 1894. It concerns the Kamilaroi people of New South Wales whose country he knew from his surveying. Mathews noted that the Kamiliaroi community was divided into two cardinal groups, these days known as moieties (although Mathews more often called them "phratries" or less often "cycles"). Each moiety was divided into a further two sections. Particular sections (from opposite moieties) were expected to intermarry. The community was also divided into totems, which were also taken into consideration when marriages were being arranged. Particular totemic groups were expected to intermarry.

Mathews noted that marriage rules similar to those of the Kamilaroi occurred across much of Australia. Some communities had intermarrying moieties without further divisions within the moiety groups. Others had moieties divided into four sections (now known as sub-sections). He plotted the distribution of marriage rules and other cultural traits in his "Map Showing Boundaries of the Several Nations of Australia", published by the American Philosophical Society in 1900.

Throughout his studies of Aboriginal kinship, Mathews claimed that some marriages occurred that were outside the standard marriage rules as generally understood by the community, although they were nonetheless accepted. He called them "irregular" marriages and argued that a further set of rules governed these relationships. Despite these departures from the standard rules, it remained a highly ordered social system. Mathews pointed out that in Kamilaroi society there were some marriages, such as those between people of the same totem, that were never deemed acceptable. Mathews' rival Howitt denounced these findings, arguing that this information was imparted by "degraded" tribes, corrupted by European influence. However, later anthropologists, including Adolphus Peter Elkin, endorsed Mathews' interpretation.

Mathews' approach to kinship was very different from that of Howitt who, as John Mulvaney has written, sought "to lay bare the essentials of primeval society, on the assumption that Australia was a storehouse of fossil customs." Mathews reacted against this approach, which was based on the social evolutionary ideas of Lewis Henry Morgan, a patron of both Howitt and his collaborator Fison. Howitt and Fison argued that the vestiges of a primitive form of social organisation, called "group marriage", were evident in Aboriginal marriage rules. Group marriage, as defined by Morgan, presupposed that groups of men who called each other "brother" had collective conjugal rights over groups of women who called each other "sister". Thomas argues that Mathews found the idea of group marriage in Aboriginal society "counterintuitive" because "the requirements of totems and sections made marriage a highly restrictive business." The idea that group marriage exists in Aboriginal Australia is now dismissed by anthropological authorities as "one of the most notable fantasies in the history of anthropology."

=== Male initiation ===
Mathews believed that ceremonial life was integral to the social cohesion of Aboriginal communities. Initiation, he explained, was "a great educational institution" intended to strengthen the civil authority of the elders of the tribe. Mathews' first publication on initiation was a description of a Bora ceremony, held by Kamilaroi people at Gundabloui in 1894. He returned to the subject of Kamilaroi initiation in his last paper, "Description of Two Bora Grounds of the Kamilaroi Tribe" (1917), published the year before his death.

In the intervening years, Mathews wrote extensively on ceremonial life, mostly in southeast Australia. More limited descriptions of ceremonies in South Australia and the Northern Territory were developed from data supplied by correspondents. Of his 171 anthropological publications, 50 are partly or wholly concerned with ceremony. The majority consist of a detailed description of the initiation ritual practised by a particular community. By 1897, Mathews could claim to have documented the male initiation ceremonies of about three quarters of the land mass of New South Wales.

Mathews wrote primarily about the early stages of male initiation. However, he published some data on female initiation in Victoria and he was attentive to the activities that occurred in the women's camps while neophytes were out in the bush being inducted into rituals by the men. Mathews documented initiation at a time when the ceremonies were endangered by colonisation and the consequent loss of access to sacred ceremonial sites. Many of the performers in ceremony who were known to Mathews were employed in the pastoral industry. Mathews' reports show that these historical changes found expression in ceremonial life. Motifs of cattle, locomotives, horses and white people were carved into the ground at ceremonial sites in New South Wales. Mathews' work on Kamilaroi initiation was cited extensively in a famous debate between Lang and Hartland about whether Aborigines "possessed the conception of a moral Being".

Much of Mathews' research on ceremony was conducted during preparatory and rehearsal periods, rather than during the initiation rituals themselves. Thomas suggests that this may have been intentional on the part of Mathews' informants, since it allowed them to control what secret-sacred information was revealed to an outsider. That Mathews was permitted even this degree of access is evidence of the degree to which he was trusted. He was given a number of sacred instruments relating to initiation ceremonies, now in the collection of the Australian Museum. Information documented by Janet Mathews, originating from Aboriginal elders on the South Coast of New South Wales in the 1960s, indicates that Mathews was himself initiated. Thomas argues that Mathews' refusal to write directly about these experiences shows that his loyalty to the secret culture was "more important than whatever kudos he might have won as an anthropologist in revealing these secrets to the world."

=== Mythology ===
Mathews' first contribution to the study of myth was a series of seven legends from various parts of New South Wales, published in 1898 as "Folklore of the Australian Aborigines" by the anthropological magazine Science of Man. He republished them as a short book the following year. Over the next decade, Mathews published another dozen articles describing Aboriginal myths. While a few legends from Western Australia were documented by a correspondent, the great bulk of Mathews' folklore research was done in person.

Mathews' interest in mythology connected with the British interest in folklore study that was a serious branch of inquiry during his lifetime. The Folklore Society, formed in 1878, was dedicated to the study of traditional music, customs, folk art, fairy tales and other vernacular traditions. The society published Folk-Lore, an internationally distributed journal, to which Mathews contributed five articles.

In keeping with the Folk-Lore style, Mathews tended to rephrase Aboriginal narratives into respectable English. This was acceptable to his allies Hartland and Lang, both prominent in folklore studies. However, Mathews' rephrasing was queried by Moritz von Leonhardi, the German editor and publisher, with whom he corresponded.

Despite these limitations, Mathews' publications and unpublished notes preserve significant examples of Aboriginal folklore that might otherwise have been lost. Mathews' most substantial documentation of Aboriginal mythology can be found in his account of the creation of the Blue Mountains, as told by Gundangara (or Gundungurra) people. The story involves an epic chase between the quoll Mirragan and the great fish Gurangatch who tore up the ground to create rivers and valleys. Mathews' surveying background and his interest in topography made him attentive to the route of the journey.

=== Linguistics ===
The first language documented by R. H. Mathews was Gundungurra in a paper co-authored with Mary Everitt, a Sydney school teacher, dated 1900. From that time, linguistic study was a major part of his research. Language elicitation can be found in 36 of his 171 works of anthropology. His linguistic writings describe a total of 53 Australian languages or dialects.

Most of Mathews' linguistic research was conducted in person during visits to Aboriginal camps or settlements. He wrote in his study of Kurnu (a major dialect of the Paakantji language, spoken in western New South Wales): "I personally collected the following elements of the language in Kurnu territory, from reliable and intelligent elders of both sexes." A few of his linguistic studies were carried out with aid of correspondents. A 210 word vocabulary of the Jingili language was prepared with the aid of a Northern Territory grazier. The Lutheran missionary and anthropologist Carl Strehlow supplied information for a paper on Luritja, spoken in Central Australia. Mathews' publications seldom name the Aboriginal people who tutored him in language, but this information can often be found in notebooks or offprints of articles among the R. H. Mathews Papers.

A consistent template was used throughout Mathews' linguistic writings. First, the grammar was explained. This was followed by vocabulary, first with the word in English and then its equivalent in the Aboriginal language. Words are grouped in categories which were loosely replicated in each article: "The Family", "The Human Body", "Natural Surroundings", "Mammals", "Birds", "Fishes", "Reptiles", "Invertebrates", "Adjectives" and "Verbs". Mathews' vocabularies typically number about 300 words, rising on occasion to 460. Mathews studied language in this manner because he believed that comparative linguistic study would provide evidence of the successive waves of migration into Australia when the continent was originally populated.

Mathews used a system of orthography developed from advice on the elicitation of native terms, circulated by the Royal Geographical Society. Mathews' documentation was not sufficiently extensive so as to allow someone to learn or speak the language. Even so, his work constitutes an important historical record of many tongues that are no longer spoken. It has been used extensively in more recent historical investigations of Aboriginal linguistics.

== Conflict with rivals ==
In a letter to Alfred William Howitt, Walter Baldwin Spencer said of Mathews that "I don't know whether to admire most his impudence his boldness or his mendacity—they are all of a very high order and seldom combined to so high a degree in one mortal man." Spencer said of Mathews' writings that they merely "corroborate or make use of" other scholarship "without adding any matter of importance".

Spencer provided little explanation of why he objected to Mathews so strongly. Theoretical differences are thought to have been a factor. Spencer believed in social evolution and group marriage, whereas Mathews was sympathetic to ideas of cultural diffusion. Mathews corresponded with W. H. R. Rivers, who became a major proponent of diffusionist theories. Early in their anthropological careers, Mathews and the Melbourne-based Spencer themselves corresponded, and they were sufficiently close in 1896 for Spencer to be listed as having communicated Mathews' article "The Bora of the Kamilaroi Tribes" to the Royal Society of Victoria. By 1898 they had completely fallen out and Spencer commenced a behind-the-scenes campaign against Mathews. Spencer wrote to British anthropologists, among them Sir James George Frazer, urging them never to quote him. Frazer agreed, promising Spencer that "I shall not even mention him [Mathews] or any of his multitudinous writings."

Spencer was closely allied to A. W. Howitt who was also hostile to Mathews. Mathews had initially assumed a collegial attitude to Howitt, describing him in 1896 as a "friend and co-worker". Until 1898, Mathews' references to Howitt's work were invariably respectful, even when their opinions differed. Howitt, however, consistently refused to acknowledge Mathews' scholarship, possibly because Mathews had queried his reports that the kinship systems of south Queensland descended through the paternal line. Mathews was enraged when Howitt's magnum opus The Native Tribes of South-East Australia was published in 1904. By that time Mathews had published more than 100 works of anthropology, but he received not a footnote in Howitt's book. The extent to which Mathews was being overlooked by his Australian contemporaries became apparent to British anthropologists. Northcote W. Thomas observed in 1906 that Mathews had written "numerous articles", all of which had "either been ignored or dismissed in a footnote by experts such as Dr. Howitt and Prof. Baldwin Spencer".

In 1907 Mathews published a critique of Howitt and Spencer in Nature in which he complained that Howitt had consistently overlooked his own work. Considering it too prominent a forum to ignore, Howitt wrote a rejoinder and thus engaged in dialogue with Mathews for the first time. Howitt made the unlikely claim that he had only ever seen two publications by Mathews "neither of which recommended itself to me by its accuracy". Mathews replied, questioning the veracity of this assertion.

Mathews and Howitt subsequently debated each other at greater length in American Antiquarian. Howitt was by this time mortally ill. His final contribution to anthropology, written on his death bed, was a denunciation of Mathews titled "A Message to Anthropologists". It was posthumously printed as a circular letter by members of the Howitt family and posted to a list of anthropological luminaries that included Henri Hubert, Émile Durkheim, Marcel Mauss, Arnold van Gennep, Franz Boas, Prince Roland Bonaparte and Carl Lumholtz. It was also published in Revue des Études Ethnographiques et Sociologiques. Martin Thomas argues that "A Message to Anthropologists" did significant damage to Mathews' reputation.

== Impact ==
Thomas notes that professional anthropologists have often been cautious in acknowledging the contribution of their "amateur" forebears. Mathews had few champions among academic anthropologists until A. P. Elkin became interested in his work. In an obituary of Alfred Radcliffe-Brown dated 1956, Elkin declared that Mathews' work on Australian kinship marked a significant intellectual breakthrough. He listed eleven key achievements in the field of kinship study, including Mathews' realisation that the totemic heroes "were related to one another in the same kinship manner as human beings were related: in other words, that they were part of the same social order." More controversially, Elkin argued that anyone "familiar with Radcliffe-Brown's writings on this subject since 1913 will realise the extent to which he used Mathews's concepts and generalisations." Elkin claimed Radcliffe-Brown was familiar with Mathews's writings but, regarding him as an amateur, "underestimated his ability for careful recording and sound generalisation. This, however, did not prevent him adopting the results of much which Mathews had accomplished." Twenty years later, Elkin built substantially on his earlier argument for Mathews' importance. This was published as a three-part journal article titled "R. H. Mathews: His Contribution to Aboriginal Studies". A draft "Part IV" in the University of Sydney Archives indicates that Elkin was planning further writings on Mathews before his death in 1979.

Another early champion was Norman Tindale who found Mathews' understanding of topography and cartography invaluable to his project of mapping tribal boundaries. The bibliography of Tindale's Aboriginal Tribes of Australia reveals the extensive use he made Mathews' writings. Tindale wrote in 1958 that in "going through Mathews' papers for the purpose of checking the second edition of my tribal map and its data, I have been more than ever impressed with the vast scope and general accuracy of this work. Despite earlier critics I am coming to believe that he was our greatest recorder of primary anthropological data."

Disagreement about the value of Mathews' work has continued. In a 1984 article the historian Diane E. Barwick, made a damning appraisal of Mathews, criticising his Victorian research for perpetrating a "sometimes ignorant and sometimes deliberate distortion [that] has so muddled the ethnographic record ". Barwick claimed that from 1898 Mathews "contradicted, ridiculed or ignored" the "careful ethnographic reports" of Howitt for whom he had an "almost pathological jealousy". (Note: 'Because R.H. Mathews' publications have been the main source for Tindale's and modern language distribution maps I cannot ignore them, but I must that his sometimes ignorant and sometimes deliberate distortion has so muddled ethnographic record that a detailed review of his research is needed. Mathews' ence in every publication from 1898 onward that all his Victorian information collected firsthand 'in the camps of the natives' is proven false by his own correspondence and notebooks. These prove that he had no contact with Aborigines or south of the Murray river before his grossly inaaccurate 1898 article mapping 'class divisions' of Victorian 'nations' was sent to press in August 1898. 1897-98 correspondence with police posts on the Murray and staff at Victorian and at Cumeroogunga, New South Wales, reveals that he knew nothing about viving communities, not even their location.') The contemporary anthropologist Deborah Bird Rose and colleagues take the opposite view, describing Mathews as "a more sober and thorough researcher" than Howitt. They claim that "Mathews did not share Howitt's penchant for suppressing the particular in favour of the grand theory, or for suppressing women in favour of men." Unusually for a male anthropologist, he acknowledged "the existence of women's law and ritual."

The enactment of native title legislation in Australia has created new interest in Mathews' work. His writings are now routinely cited in native title claims put forward by Aboriginal claimants.

== Sources ==
- Atchison, John (1986). "Mathews, Hamilton Bartlett (1873–1959)". Australian Dictionary of Biography. Vol. 10. National Centre of Biography, Australian National University. ISBN 978-0-522-84459-7. ISSN 1833-7538. OCLC 70677943.
- Barwick, Diane E. (1984). McBryde, Isabel (ed.). "Mapping the past: an atlas of Victorian clans 1835–1904". Aboriginal History. 8 (2): 100–131. JSTOR 24045800.
- Dorson, Richard M. (1968). The British Folklorists: A History. Chicago: University of Chicago Press. ch. 1.
- Durkheim, Émile (1926). The Elementary Forms of the Religious Life: A Study in Religious Sociology. London: George Allen & Unwin. pp. 143, 162.
- Elkin, A. P. (1956). "A. R. Radcliffe-Brown, 1880–1955". Oceania. 26 (4): 250. doi:10.1002/j.1834-4461.1956.tb01717.x.
- Elkin, A. P. (1975a). "R. H. Mathews: His Contribution to Aboriginal Studies: Part I". Oceania. 46 (1): 1–24. doi:10.1002/j.1834-4461.1975.tb01884.x.
- Elkin, A. P. (1975b). "R. H. Mathews: His Contribution to Aboriginal Studies: Part II". Oceania. 46 (2): 126–52. doi:10.1002/j.1834-4461.1975.tb01901.x.
- Elkin, A. P. (1976). "R. H. Mathews: His Contribution to Aboriginal Studies: Part III". Oceania. 46 (3): 206–34. doi:10.1002/j.1834-4461.1976.tb01243.x.
- van Gennep, Arnold (1996). Rites of Passage. London: Routledge. p. 74.
- Hiatt, L. R. (1996). Arguments about Aborigines: Australia and the Evolution of Social Anthropology. Cambridge University Press.
- Howitt, A. W. (1907). "Literature relating to Australian Aborigines". Letter to the editor. Nature. 77 (1987): 80–81. doi:10.1038/077080d0. S2CID 3971328.
- Howitt, A. W. (1908). "A Message to Anthropologists". Revue des Études Ethnographiques et Sociologiques. Vol. 1. pp. 481–82.
- Illert, Christopher R. (2001). "The Centenary of Mary Everitt's "Gundungurra" Grammar" (PDF). Journal and Proceedings of the Royal Society of New South Wales. 134 Parts 1 and 2 (399–400): 19–44. ISSN 0035-9173. Archived from the original (PDF) on 4 February 2014.
- Kass, Terry (2008). Sails to Satellites: The Surveyors General of NSW (1786–2007). Bathurst, NSW: Department of Lands. p. 31.
- Kloot, Tess (1986). "Mathews, Gregory Macalister (1876–1949)". Australian Dictionary of Biography. Vol. 10. National Centre of Biography, Australian National University. ISBN 978-0-522-84459-7. ISSN 1833-7538. OCLC 70677943.
- Lang, Andrew (1903). Social Origins. London: Longmans, Green, and Co. p. 38.
- Mathews, R. H. (1888). Handbook to Magisterial Inquiries in New South Wales: Being a Practical Guide for Justices of the Peace in Holding Inquiries in Lieu of Inquests, etc. Sydney: George Robertson and Co.
- Mathews, R. H. (1893). "Rock Paintings by the Aborigines in Caves on Bulgar Creek, near Singleton". Journal and Proceedings of the Royal Society of New South Wales. 27: 353–8.
- Mathews, R. H. (1894). "Aboriginal Bora held at Gundabloui in 1894". Journal and Proceedings of the Royal Society of New South Wales. 28: 98–129.
- Mathews, R. H. (1894–1895). "The Kamilaroi Class System of the Australian Aborigines". Proceedings and Transactions of the Queensland Branch of the Royal Geographical Society of Australasia. 10.
- Mathews, R. H. (1896a). "The Bora of the Kamilaroi Tribes". Proceedings of the Royal Society of Victoria. new series. 9: 137.
- Mathews, R. H. (1896b). "The Būrbŭng of the Wiradthuri Tribes". Journal of the Anthropological Institute. 25: 313.
- Mathews, R. H. (1897). "The Burbung, or Initiation Ceremonies of the Murrumbidgee Tribes". Journal and Proceedings of the Royal Society of New South Wales. 31: 114.
- Mathews, R. H. (1898). "Folklore of the Australian Aborigines". Science of Man. new series. 1.
- Mathews, R. H. (1899). Folklore of the Australian Aborigines. Sydney: Hennessey, Harper and Company.
- Mathews, R. H. (1900). "The Origin, Organization and Ceremonies of the Australian Aborigines". Proceedings of the American Philosophical Society. 39: 556–78.
- Mathews, R. H. (1900–1901). "Ethnological Notes on the Aboriginal Tribes of the Northern Territory". Queensland Geographical Journal. 16.
- Mathews, R. H. (1904). "Ethnological Notes on the Aboriginal Tribes of New South Wales and Victoria". Journal and Proceedings of the Royal Society of New South Wales. 38: 165 – via Trove.
- Mathews, R. H. (1907a). "Languages of some Tribes of Western Australia". Proceedings of the American Philosophical Society. 46.
- Mathews, R. H. (1907b). "Ethnological Notes on the Aboriginal Tribes of New South Wales and Victoria". Letter to the Editor. Nature. 76 (1958): 31–32. doi:10.1038/076031e0. hdl:2027/chi.083111000. S2CID 4040599.
- Mathews, R. H. (1908). "Some Mythology of the Gundungurra Tribe, New South Wales". Zeitschrift für Ethnologie. 40 (2). Dietrich Reimer Verlag: 203–206. JSTOR 23030223.
- Mathews, R. H. (1909). "Folklore Notes from Western Australia". Folk-Lore. 20 (3): 340–342. doi:10.1080/0015587X.1909.9719891.
- Mathews, R. H. (1917). "Description of Two Bora Grounds of the Kamilaroi Tribe". Journal and Proceedings of the Royal Society of New South Wales. 51.
- Mathews, R. H. (2007). "Language of the Kurnu Tribe, New South Wales". In Thomas, Martin (ed.). Culture in Translation: The anthropological legacy of R. H. Mathews. Aboriginal History Monographs. Canberra: ANU Press. p. 80. ISBN 978-192131325-7.
- Mathews, R. H.; Everitt, M. M. (1900). "The Organisation, Language and Initiation Ceremonies of the Aborigines of the South-East Coast of N. S. Wales". Journal and Proceedings of the Royal Society of New South Wales. 34: 262–81.
- McBryde, Isabel (1974). "Mathews, Robert Hamilton (1841–1918)". Australian Dictionary of Biography. Vol. 5. National Centre of Biography, Australian National University. ISBN 978-0-522-84459-7. ISSN 1833-7538. OCLC 70677943.
- Miller, James (1985). Koori: A Will to Win: The Heroic Resistance, Survival & Triumph of Black Australia. Sydney: Angus & Robertson. p. 104.
- Muir, Alison (2004). "The eighteenth century paper-makers of the north of Ireland". Familia: Ulster Genealogical Review (20): 59. ISBN 978-190368852-6.
- Mulvaney, D. J. (1971). "The Ascent of Aboriginal Man: Howitt as Anthropologist". In Walker, Mary Howitt (ed.). Come Wind, Come Weather: A Biography of Alfred Howitt. Melbourne University Press. p. 290.
- Rose, Deborah Bird; James, Diana; Watson, Christine (2003). Indigenous Kinship with the Natural World in New South Wales. Hurstville, NSW: National Parks and Wildlife Service. p. 17.
- Thomas, Martin (2004). "R. H. Mathews and Anthropological Warfare: On writing the biography of a "self-contained man"". Aboriginal History. 28: 1–32. JSTOR 24046582.
- Thomas, Martin (2007a). ""Birrarak is the name given to me by the natives": Ethnological Notes on R. H. Mathews". In Thomas, Martin (ed.). Culture in Translation: The anthropological legacy of R. H. Mathews. Aboriginal History Monographs. Canberra: ANU Press. pp. 19–20. ISBN 978-192131325-7.
- Thomas, Martin (2007b). "The Ethnomania of R. H. Mathews: Anthropology and the rage for collecting". In Poiner, Gretchen; Jack, Sybil (eds.). Limits of Location: Creating a Colony. Sydney University Press. pp. 189–208.
- Thomas, Martin (2007c). "Rock Art and Daily Life: Introduction". In Thomas, Martin (ed.). Culture in Translation: The anthropological legacy of R. H. Mathews. Aboriginal History Monographs. Canberra: ANU Press. p. 43. ISBN 978-192131325-7.
- Thomas, Martin (2007d). "Kinship and Marriage: Introduction". In Thomas, Martin (ed.). Culture in Translation: The anthropological legacy of R. H. Mathews. Aboriginal History Monographs. Canberra: ANU Press. p. 89. ISBN 978-192131325-7.
- Thomas, Martin (2007e). "Mythology: Introduction". In Thomas, Martin (ed.). Culture in Translation: The anthropological legacy of R. H. Mathews. Aboriginal History Monographs. Canberra: ANU Press. p. 127. ISBN 978-192131325-7.
- Thomas, Martin (2007f). "Language: Introduction". In Thomas, Martin (ed.). Culture in Translation: The anthropological legacy of R. H. Mathews. Aboriginal History Monographs. Canberra: ANU Press. p. 158. ISBN 978-192131325-7.
- Thomas, Martin (July 2008). "Word Territory: Recording Aboriginal language with R. H. Mathews". History Australia. 5 (1): 37.1 – 37.18. doi:10.2104/ha080037. S2CID 143454844.
- Thomas, Martin (2011a). The Many Worlds of R. H. Mathews: In Search of an Australian Anthropologist. Sydney: Allen & Unwin. p. 11.
- Tindale, Norman B. (1974). Aboriginal tribes of Australia, their terrain, environmental controls, distribution, limits, and proper names (with four sheet map). Berkeley and Canberra: University of California Press.
