= Aldo Massola =

Australian anthropologist and museum curator

Aldo Massola (9 September 1910 – 6 July 1975) was an Italian-Australian anthropologist, a curator at the National Museum of Victoria in Melbourne from 1954 to 1964, who overcame scandal in his personal life to author a number of influential books about Aboriginal Victorians.

Born in Rome, Italy, he emigrated with his family to Melbourne in 1923. In 1964 he was imprisoned, having been found guilty of the theft of more than 250 rare gold coins.

Although his work has been superseded and updated, he remains important because of his pioneering studies in the field. His published books include: Bunjil's Cave: Myths, Legends and Superstitions of the Aborigines of South-East Australia (1968); Journey to Aboriginal Victoria (1970); Aboriginal Mission Stations in Victoria (1970) and The Aborigines of South-Eastern Australia As They Were (1971).
