= Ngarigo language =

Extinct Pama–Nyungan language of Australia

Ngarigo
- Jaitmathang, Walgalu, Southern Inland Yuin
- Region: New South Wales & ACT, Australia
- Ethnicity: Ngarigo, Walgalu (Ngambri), Jaitmatang
- Extinct: by 2006
- Language family: Pama–Nyungan: Yuin–Kuric; Yuin; Ngarigo
- Dialects: Ngarigo; Yaithmatang; Walgalu (Wolgal)

Language codes
- ISO 639-3: Either: xni – Ngarigo xjt – Jaitmathang
- Glottolog: sout2770
- AIATSIS: S46 Ngarigu / Ngarigo, S98 Southern Ngarigu, D62 Canberra language, S47 Walgalu, S43 Gundungerre / Yaithmathang
- ELP: Ngarigu
- Location of Ngarigu/Ngarigo Country in Victoria and New South Wales

Ngarigo (Ngarigu) is an extinct Australian Aboriginal language, the traditional language of the Ngarigo people of inland far southeast New South Wales.

Yaithmathang (Jaitmathang), also known as Gundungerre, was a dialect.

== Phonology ==
Consonant sounds
	Labial	Dental	Alveolar	Retroflex	Palatal	Velar
Stop	b	d̪	d	ɖ	ɟ	k/ɡ
Nasal	m		n		ɲ	ŋ
Lateral			l		ʎ	
Rhotic			ɾ~r			
Approximant	w				j	

Vowels given are /a i u/.
