= Aboriginal History =

- Discipline: Anthropology, history, Indigenous studies
- Language: English
- Edited by: Ingereth MacFarlane, Liz Conor

Publication details
- History: 1977–present
- Publisher: Aboriginal History, Australian National University (Australia)
- Frequency: Annually
- Open access: Yes

Standard abbreviations
- ISO 4: Aborig. Hist.

Indexing
- ISSN: 0314-8769 (print); 1837-9389 (web)

Links
- Journal homepage; Online access at ANU Press

Aboriginal History is an annual peer-reviewed academic journal published as an open access journal by Aboriginal History Inc. and ANU Press. It was established in 1977 (co-founded and edited by Diane Barwick) and covers interdisciplinary historical studies in the field of the interactions between Aboriginal Australian and Torres Strait Islander peoples and non-Indigenous peoples.

== Scope ==
The journal's scope includes the areas of Australian Indigenous history and oral histories, languages, biographies, bibliographic guides and archival research. It has also brought previously unpublished manuscripts and research in the fields of Australian archaeology, anthropology, linguistics, demography, sociology, law and geography to the professional and wider public. A focus on cultural, political and economic history is complemented by critiques of current events of relevance to Aboriginal and Torres Strait Islander culture and society.
