= Alfred William Howitt =

Australian anthropologist, explorer and naturalist (1830–1908)

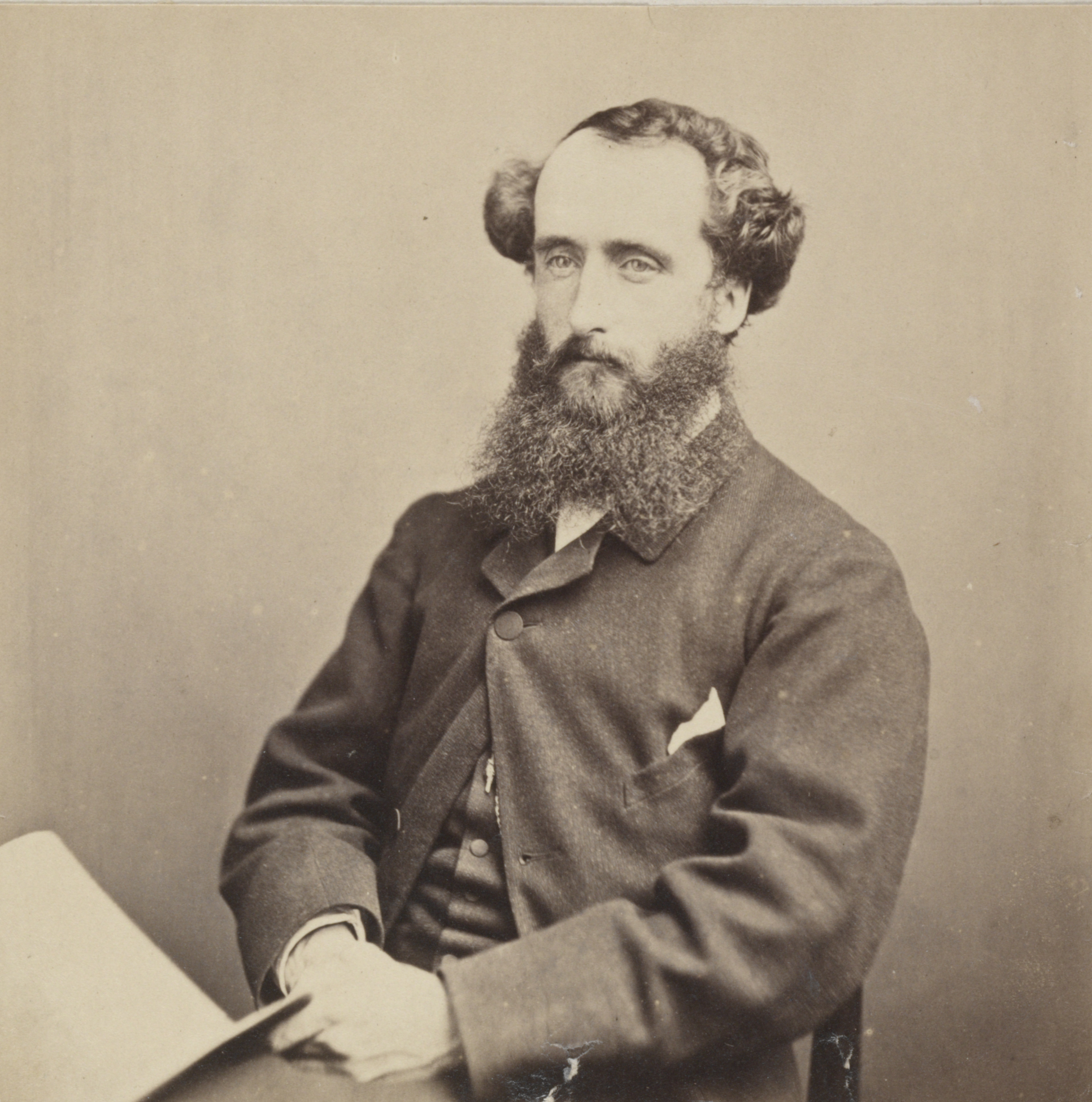
- Howitt, c. 1861
- Born: 17 April 1830; Nottingham, England
- Died: 7 March 1908 (aged 77); Bairnsdale, Australia
- Burial place: Bairnsdale Cemetery
- Occupations: Anthropologist, writer, explorer
- Known for: Leader of the expedition to rescue the Burke and Wills expedition. Anthropological work in Australia.
- Parents: William Howitt (father); Mary Howitt (mother)

Alfred William Howitt CMG (17 April 1830 – 7 March 1908), also known by author abbreviation A. W. Howitt, was an Australian anthropologist, explorer and naturalist. He was known for leading the Victorian Relief Expedition, which set out to establish the fate of the ill-fated Burke and Wills expedition.

== Biography ==
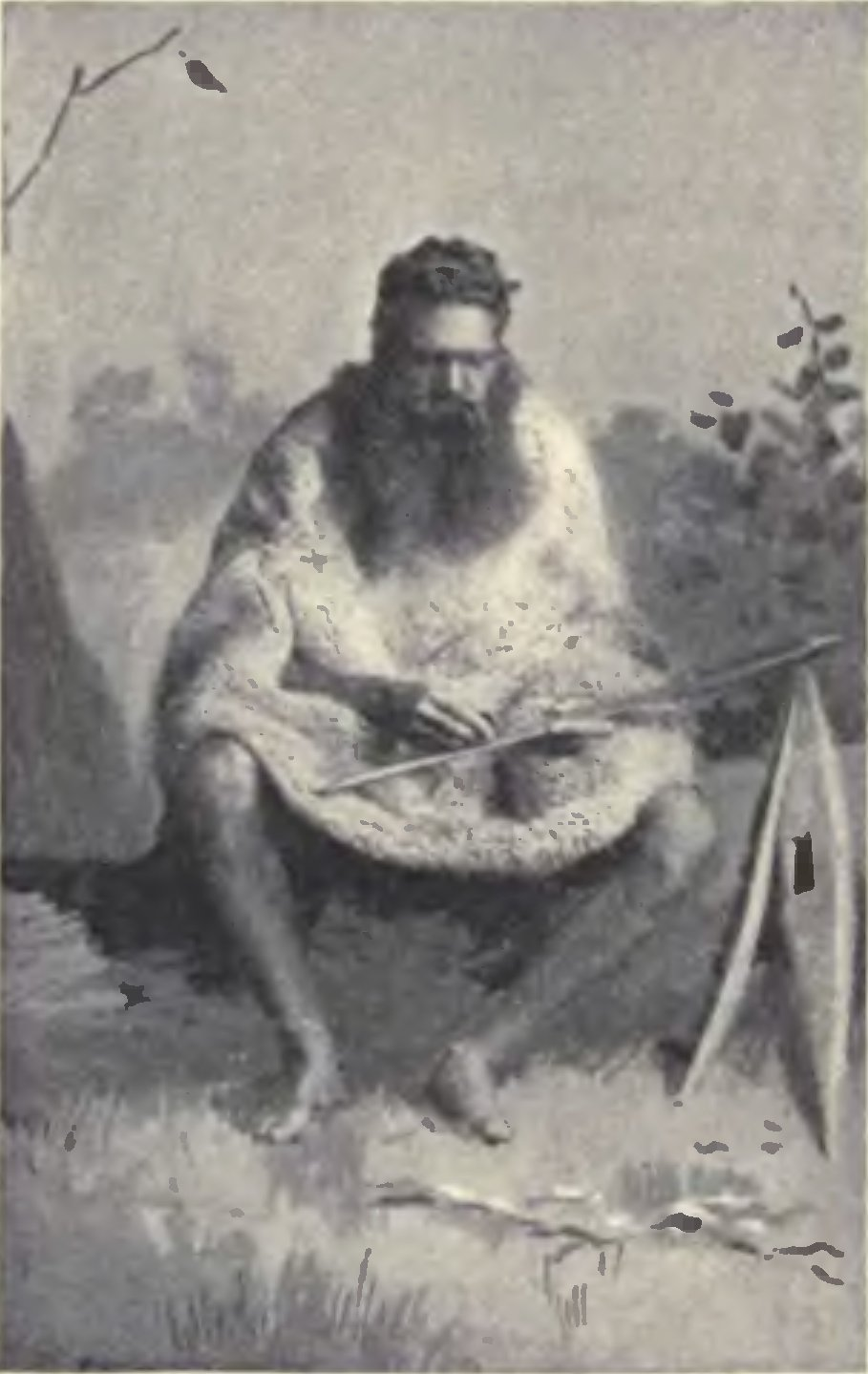
Scan of illustration from p. 40 of The native tribes of South-East Australia, 1904

Howitt was born on 17 April 1830, in Nottingham, England, the son of authors William Howitt and Mary Botham.

He went to the Victorian gold fields in 1852 with his father and brother to visit his uncle, Godfrey Howitt. Initially, Howitt was a geologist in Victoria; later, he worked as a gold warden in North Gippsland. Howitt went on to be appointed Police magistrate & Warden Crown Lands Commissioner; later still, he held the position of Secretary of the Mines Department.

In 1861, the Royal Society of Victoria appointed Howitt leader of the Victorian Relief Expedition, with the task of establishing the fate of the Burke and Wills expedition. Howitt was a skilled bushman; he took only the necessary equipment and a small crew on the journey to Cooper Creek. There, on 16 September he found sole survivor John King; Howitt buried Burke and Wills before returning to Melbourne with King. On a follow-up expedition to Cooper Creek in 1862, Howitt recovered the bodies of Burke and Wills for burial at the Melbourne General Cemetery.

Howitt collected botanical specimens during his expeditions in north-eastern South Australia, south-western Queensland and western New South Wales; his collections were sent to Baron von Mueller and are now in Melbourne.

Howitt researched the culture and society of Indigenous Australians, in particular kinship and marriage; he was influenced by the theories of evolution and anthropology. Howitt's major work (co-authored with Lorimer Fison) was "Kamilaroi and Kurnai" (1879), which was recognised internationally as a landmark in the development of the modern science of anthropology; this work was used by others, including the twentieth century anthropologist Norman Tindale.

In 1863, he married Maria (nickname 'Liney') Boothby; they had five children. Maria was the daughter of Judge Benjamin Boothby, Chief Justice of the Colony of South Australia. Howitt was Secretary for Mines in Victoria.

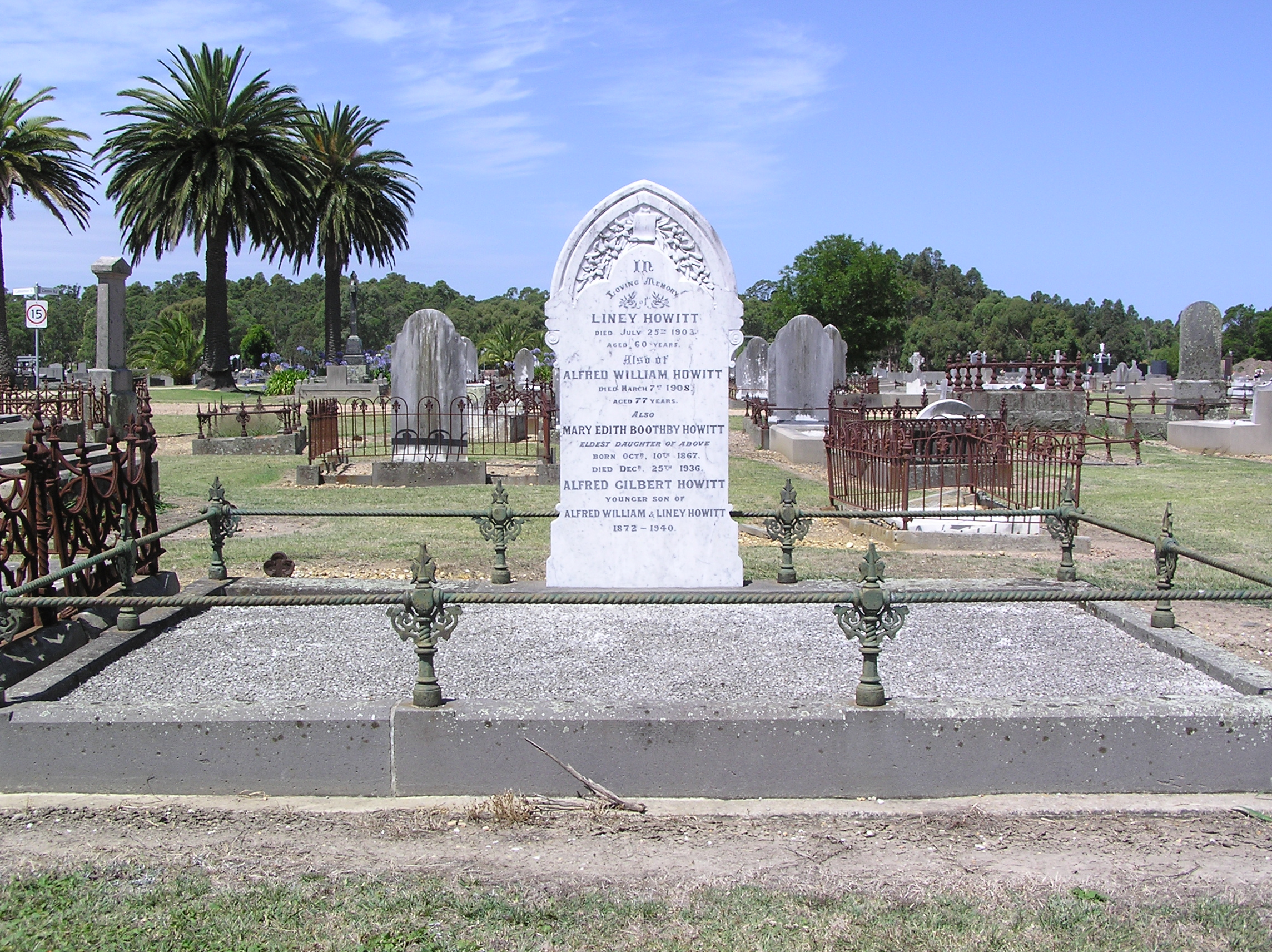
Alfred William Howitts grave site at the Bairnsdale Cemetery

In 1903, Howitt was awarded the Clarke Medal by the Royal Society of New South Wales; in 1904 he received the first Mueller Medal from the Royal Society of Victoria. A memorial fund established after his death was used to buy rare books on topics such as anthropology, geology, and botany for the library of the Royal Society; these books were inscribed "Purchased from A. W. Howitt Memorial Fund". He was appointed CMG in the 1906 Birthday Honours.

Howitt died on 7 March 1908, aged 77, in Bairnsdale. The recreational park named in his honour is located adjacent to the Mitchell River Bridge on the eastern side of Bairnsdale.

Howitt's scientific life shared a special irony with that of his longtime friend Lorimer Fison. They were both set in motion by Lewis Henry Morgan; Morgan pinned more hope on Fison than on Howitt. However, Fison gave up his scientific pursuit shortly after Morgan's death, whereas Howitt persevered for many years. Howitt's magnum opus, The Native Tribes of South East Australia (1904), remains one of the only contemporaneous scientific studies of the native institutions of Central Australian Aborigines.

== Recognition ==
Mount Howitt in Victoria, and Howitt Hall, one of Monash University's Halls of Residence, are named after him. Howitt Street in Kingston, Canberra, and Howitt Street in Traralgon, are also named after him. It is likely that Howitt, a locality beside the Gulf of Carpentaria in Queensland, is named after him, because many localities in the area are named after those connected to the Burke and Wills expedition.

Awards
Preceded by Frederick Manson Bailey	Clarke Medal; 1903	Succeeded by Walter Howchin
