= Kuringgai =

Term used to refer to an Aboriginal Australian people from coastal New South Wales

Kuringgai people
- aka: Ku-ring-gai, Kuring-gai, and Guringai; Kuringgai (AIATSIS), nd (SIL)
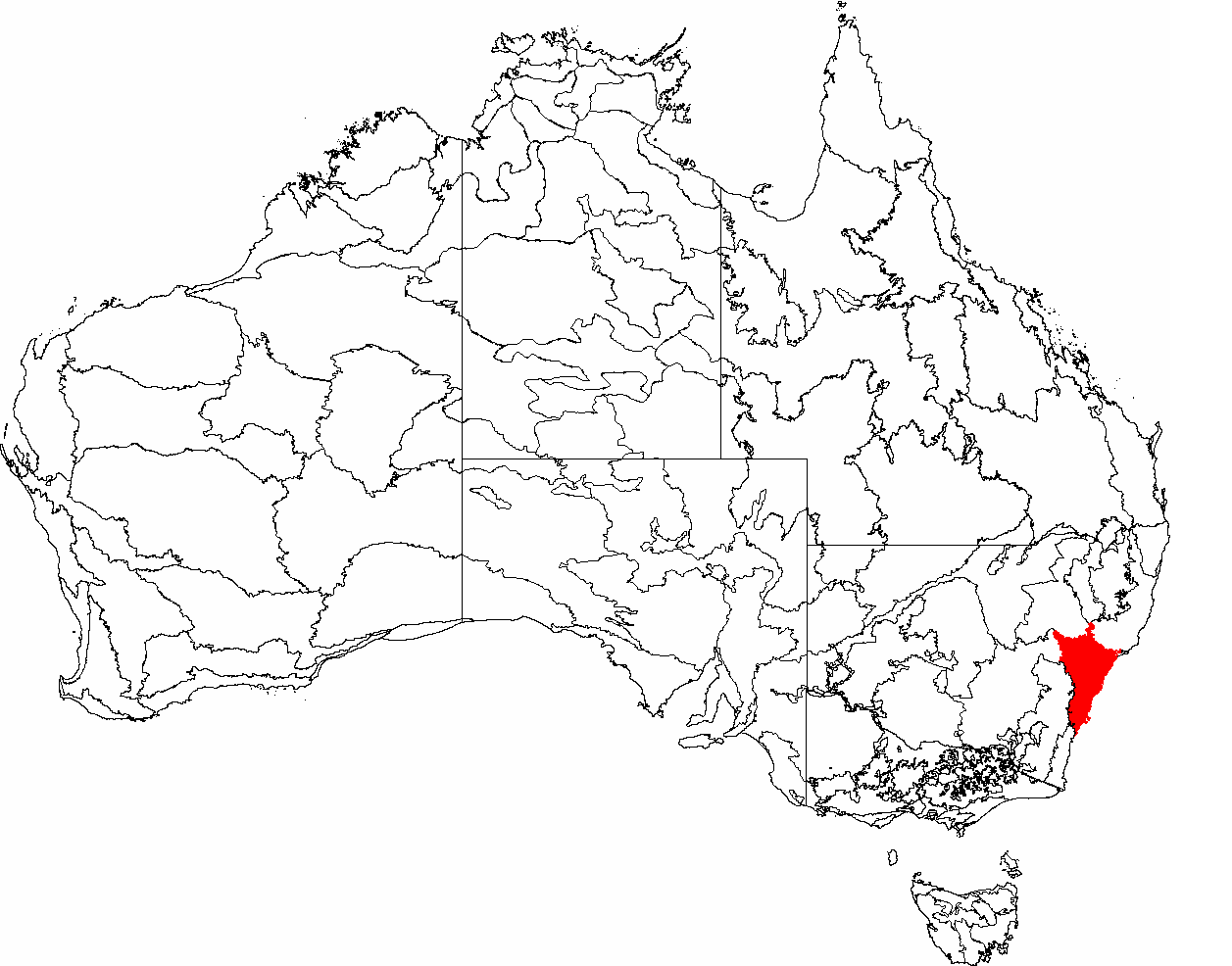
- Sydney Basin bioregion

Hierarchy
- Language family: Pama–Nyungan
- Language branch: Yuin–Kuric
- Language group: Gathang language
- Group dialects: Awabakal language

Area
- Bioregion: Sydney Basin
- Location: Sydney, Central Coast, and Newcastle, New South Wales

Kuringgai (also spelled Ku-ring-gai, Kuring-gai, Guringai, Kuri-nggai) ([kuriŋɡai],) is an ethnonym used sometimes to classify the Indigenous Australian people who spoke the Gathang language along the coastal areas between Sydney and Port Macquarie, in particular to those people located in the Pittwater and Central Coast regions.

In the present day, the term Kuringgai is considered redundant and the people it referred to are now regarded as being synonymous with the Awabakal people, specifically those clans from the Broken Bay region.

== Origins of the ethnonym ==
In 1892, ethnologist John Fraser edited and republished the work of Lancelot Edward Threlkeld on the language of the Awabakal people, An Australian Grammar, with lengthy additions. In his "Map of New South Wales as occupied by the native tribes" and text accompanying it, he coined the term Kuringgai to refer to a hypothetical people he believed inhabited a large stretch of the central coastline of New South Wales. This term was derived from the Awabakal word for man, kuri.

Fraser regarded the language described by Threlkeld as a dialect of a larger language, variations of which were spoken by many other tribes in New South Wales:

we have now come to know that this dialect was essentially the same as that spoken by the sub-tribes occupying the land where Sydney now stands, and that they all formed parts of one great tribe, the Kuringgai.

In the text accompanying his map, he states:

The next great tribe is the Kuringgai on the sea coast. Their taurai (hunting ground or territory) is known to extend north to the Macleay River, and I found that southwards it reached the Hawkesbury. then after, by examining the remains of the language of the natives about Sydney and southwards, and by other tests, I assured myself that the country thereabout was occupied by sub-tribes of the Kuringgai.

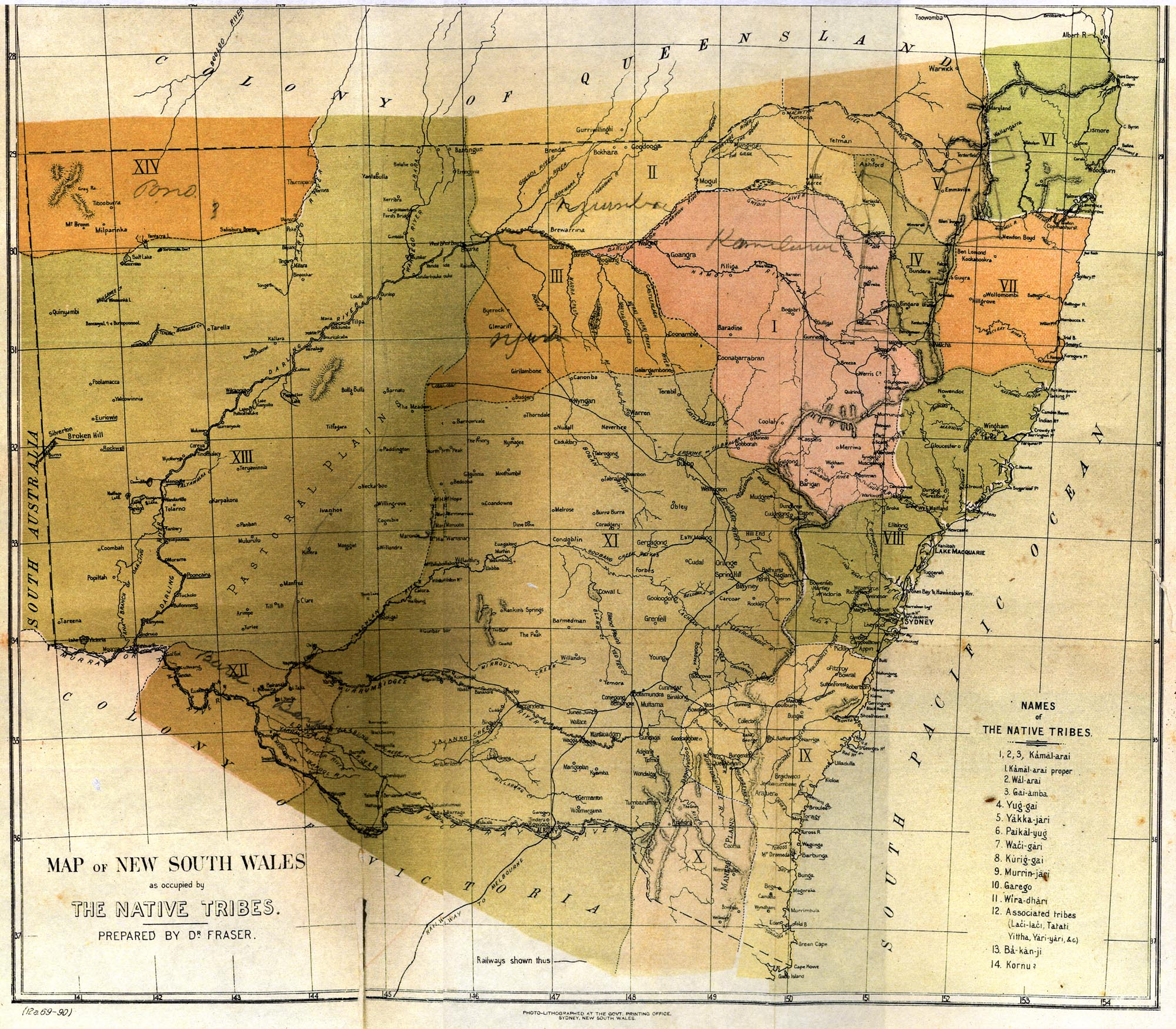
Fraser's 1892 map. Kuringgai is marked VIII.

== Debate on the validity of the term ==
Norman Tindale, in his 1974 classic survey of all known Australian tribes, was dismissive of Fraser's conjecture as "poor" in details, and "unquestionably the most inaccurate and garbled account ever published about the aborigines. Many of his tribal names were pure artifacts", each created to subsume under an invented label several different tribal identities: thus his fantasy of a Paikalyung crushed together 10 tribal units; his Yunggai nation throws together the Anēwan, Jukambal and the Kwiambal; his Wachigaru dissolves into one fictional unity the Banbai, Gumbaynggirr, Ngaku and some of the Dunghutti. Even his acknowledgement of the Ualarai actually sweeps up 5 distinct aboriginal societies. Under his heading for the Awabakal, he writes:

the Awabakal are the central one of a series of tribes to which the arbitrary term Kuringgai has been applied by Fraser.

Where Fraser discerned one "nation", Tindale defined a conglomeration of distinct tribes such as the Tharawal, Eora, Dharuk, Darkinjang, Awabakal, Worimi, Wonnarua, Birpai and Ngamba.

Arthur Capell, writing four years earlier, thought to the contrary that Kuringgai/Guriŋgai denoted some substantive historical reality, and was an appropriate name for the language spoken on the north side of Port Jackson northwards at least as far as Tuggerah Lakes. He concluded under the heading Karee/Kuringgai that the reference is to:

the language of the Pittwater people, and included the well-known Cammeraygal on the extreme south, along the northern shores of Port Jackson, and stretched as far north at least as Broken Bay. This is the basis for the statement above that the "Sydney" language did not cross Port Jackson

Val Attenbrow dismissed Capell's claim for an independent Guriŋgai, while Amanda Lissarrague and Jim Wafer reanalyzed the material and concluded the word denoted the "Hunter River-Lake Macquarie language", otherwise known as Awabakal.

Geoff Ford in his thesis, "Darkiñung recognition : an analysis of the historiography for the Aborigines from the Hawkesbury-Hunter Ranges to the Northwest of Sydney (2010)" Chapters 8 & 9 in particular investigates the work of Threlkeld, Fraser, Matthews and others and determined that the Kuringgai were actually the "Wannungine". These were the same people that Thelkeld worked with and Fraser identified as Awabakal.

The paper "Guringaygupa djuyal, barray: Language and Country of the Guringay People" by Amanda Lissarrague and Robert Syron (November 2024) explores the historical and linguistic connections between the Guringay people and their land north of the Hunter River. It also critiques the invention and misapplication of the term "Kuringgai" (or "Guringai"), which has been mistakenly associated with Aboriginal groups north of Sydney.

The historical record confirms that the Gringai (or Grengai) people occupied areas north of the Hunter River. The name's written form has undergone multiple transformations due to English-speaking colonial interpretations. The Guringay dialect is part of the Gathang language, spoken alongside Birrbay and Warrimay. Linguistic evidence supports the distinctiveness of Guringay from languages spoken south of the Hunter.

The study also maps Guringay country, highlighting early references from colonial sources such as William Scott (1929) and James Boydell (1895), who confirmed their presence in the Paterson, Allyn, and Williams River regions. However, post-1904 maps progressively excluded references to Gringai, leading to Tindale's classification (1940, 1974), which misidentified the region's language groupings.

A key issue examined in the paper is the origin of "Kuringgai" as a constructed term. In 1892, John Fraser coined the term “Kuringgai” based on his flawed analysis of Aboriginal languages, extending it across an unrealistically vast region from Bulli to beyond the Hastings River. This misclassification was later reinforced by Arthur Capell (1970), who applied "Kuringgai" to a supposed language from north of Port Jackson to Tuggerah Lakes, despite linguistic evidence showing that it was simply a dialect of the Hunter River and Lake Macquarie (HRLM) language.

Further confusion arose in 1993 when James Kohen continued using "Kuringgai" to describe a supposed north Sydney Aboriginal language, despite its lack of historical or linguistic basis. The AIATSIS map (1996) incorporated "Kuringgai," cementing the error in public perception.

The paper critically examines the appropriation of the term "Guringai" by non-Indigenous groups in Sydney, particularly the Guringai Tribal Link (2003), which claims cultural representation over the region despite the name's colonial origins. Educational resources, including the History of Aboriginal Sydney project and the Australian Museum, continue to propagate the misattribution, further alienating actual Guringay descendants from their cultural heritage.

The authors advocate for the correct recognition of Guringay people and their affiliation with Gathang language, urging government and community bodies to cease using "Kuringgai/Guringai" for the Sydney and Central Coast region. They highlight the First Languages Australia Gambay Map, which properly reinstates Guringay north of the Hunter, while calling for transparency and historical accuracy in discussions about Aboriginal heritage.

== Usage in the modern era ==
The name invented by John Fraser still reverberates in a number of placenames and institutions in New South Wales.

- Electoral district of Ku-ring-gai
- Hornsby Ku-ring-gai Hospital
- Ku-ring-gai Chase National Park
- Ku-ring-gai High School
- Ku-ring-gai Council
- Mount Ku-ring-gai
- Kuring-gai College of Advanced Education, subsumed in 1989 as part of the University of Technology, Sydney

== Sources ==
- Attenbrow, Val (2010). Sydney's Aboriginal Past: Investigating the Archaeological and Historical Records. University of New South Wales Press. ISBN 978-1-742-23116-7.
- Capell, A. (September 1970). "Aboriginal Languages in the South Central Coast, New South Wales: Fresh Discoveries". Oceania. 41 (1): 20–27. doi:10.1002/j.1834-4461.1970.tb01112.x. JSTOR 40329895.
- Foley, Dennis (2007). "Leadership: the quandary of Aboriginal societies in crises, 1788 – 1830, and 1966". In Macfarlane, Ingereth; Hannah, Mark (eds.). Transgressions: Critical Australian Indigenous histories. Vol. 16. Australian National University Press. pp. 177–192. ISBN 978-1-921-31344-8. JSTOR j.ctt24hfb0.12.
- "Ku-ring-gai". AIATSIS. Archived from the original on 27 August 2016.
- Maynard, John (2014). True Light and Shade: An Aboriginal Perspective of Joseph Lycett's Art. National Library of Australia. ISBN 978-0-642-27708-4.
- Ridley, William (1861). Lang, Gideon S. (ed.). The Aborigines of Australia (PDF). London: Edward Stanford.
- Steele, Jeremy M. (December 2005). The aboriginal language of Sydney (PDF) (M.A. thesis). Macquarie University.
- Threlkeld, L.E.; Fraser, John (1892). An Australian language as spoken by the Awabakal, the people of Awaba, or lake Macquarie (near Newcastle, New South Wales) being an account of their language, traditions, and customs (PDF). Sydney: C. Potter, Govt. Printer.
- Tindale, Norman Barnett (1974). "Awabakal (NSW)". Aboriginal Tribes of Australia: Their Terrain, Environmental Controls, Distribution, Limits, and Proper Names. Australian National University. Archived from the original on 15 March 2015.
