= John Fraser (ethnologist) =

Australian ethnologist, linguist and educator

Reverend Dr John Fraser (1834 – 1904) was an Australian ethnologist, linguist, school headmaster and author of many scholarly works. He is known for his revised and expanded version of Lancelot Threlkeld's 1834 work, An Australian Grammar, with the new title An Australian language as spoken by the Awabakal, the people of Awaba or Lake Macquarie (near Newcastle, New South Wales) being an account of their language, traditions and customs / by L.E. Threlkeld; re-arranged, condensed and edited with an appendix by John Fraser (1892). In this, Fraser created new divisions and terminology for some Aboriginal groups in New South Wales.

== Biography ==
Fraser was born in Perth, Scotland in 1834 and educated at the University of Edinburgh.

He migrated to Australia and settled at Maitland, New South Wales. In 1861 he was appointed rector of the Presbyterian Maitland High School, before going on to establish his own school, known as Sauchie House (now Maitland Boys High School). There he remained as headmaster for about 20 years.

Apart from being an advocate of Christian missions, Fraser was an ethnologist and linguist, with a particular interest in Australian Aboriginal languages. His book, The Aborigines of New South Wales, won the 1882 Royal Society of New South Wales Prize, and he wrote numerous scholarly articles and books.

== An Australian Language (1892) ==
The work which won him most recognition was his much expanded and authoritative edition of L.E. Threlkeld's grammar of the Awabakal language, An Australian Grammar. Fraser's revised edition, containing much original material based on his own research, was published in 1892 as An Australian language as spoken by the Awabakal, the people of Awaba or Lake Macquarie (near Newcastle, New South Wales) being an account of their language, traditions and customs / by L.E. Threlkeld; re-arranged, condensed and edited with an appendix by John Fraser.

In the preface, Fraser writes: "...but we have now come to know that this dialect was essentially the same as that spoken by the sub-tribes occupying the land where Sydney now stands, and that they all formed part of one great tribe, the Kuriggai".

The book included a "Map of New South Wales as occupied by the native tribes", accompanied by descriptions and names decided upon by Fraser after "ten years' thought and inquiry on the location of our native tribes". In the text accompanying his map, Fraser writes:

The New England tribe, the Yunggai has caused me much perplexity... I have...called this tribe the Yung-gai, from Yung – the name which the coast tribes give to New England...The Ngarego tribe belongs to Victoria rather than to New South Wales... Of these tribes, the Kamalarai tribe, Walarai, Ngaiamba, Bakanji, Waradhari, the Associated Tribes, the Ngarego, the Kuringgai, are names already established and in use; and most of them are formed from the local word for 'no'... The names Murrinjari, Wachigari, Paikalyung, Yakkajari, I have made, for these tribes have no general names for themselves.

His major work was not without its later critics.

Historian Niel Gunson wrote in 1974 that the work was "hampered by his peculiar theories of racial and linguistic origin".

Anthropologist and ethnologist Norman Tindale (Aboriginal tribes of Australia, 1974) wrote that there was such a

"literary need for major groupings that [Fraser] set out to provide them for New South Wales, coining entirely artificial terms for his 'Great tribes'. These were not based on field research and lacked aboriginal support. His names such as Yunggai, Wachigari and Yakkajari can be ignored as artifacts. During the 1890s the idea spread and soon there was a rash of such terms...Some of these have entered, unfortunately, into popular literature, despite their dubious origins.

He goes on to list the Bangarang (Pangerang) (Vic.); Booandik (Vic. & SA); Barkunjee (Barkindji) (NSW), Kurnai (Vic.), Thurrawal (Dharawal) (NSW), Wiradjuri (NSW) and Malegoondeet (?) (Vic.) as some of these names, and mentions R.H. Mathews, A.W. Howitt and John Mathew as promulgators of the "nations" concept.

Tindale later (under his entry for Awakabal, p. 200) refers to Kuringgai as an "arbitrary term...applied by Fraser", the Awabakal being the central tribe of the several to which Fraser applied the group term.

=== Comparison of contents ===
==== 1834 edition ====
The contents of Threlkeld's work are as follows:

- Introductory remarks
- Part 1: Pronunciation and Orthography (three chapters: Pronunciation; Orthography; Etymology)
- Part 2: The parts of speech
- Part 3: Vocabulary and illustrations (two chapters: Vocabulary; Illustrations)

==== 1892 edition ====
The contents of Fraser's edition are as follows:

- Frontispiece: Map of New South Wales as occupied by the native tribes
- The illustrations [Text explaining map, and three other illustrations, pictures of people]
- Introduction
- Part 1.
  - An Australian grammar : comprehending the principles and natural rules of the language, as spoken by the aborigines, in the vicinity of Hunter's River, Lake Macquarie, &c. New South Wales / L.E. Threlkeld [1834]
  - A key to the structure of the aboriginal language : being an analysis of the particles used as affixes, to form the various modifications of the verbs; shewing the essential powers, abstract roots, and other peculiarities of the language spoken by the aborigines in the vicinity of Hunter River, lake Macquarie, etc., New South wales / L.E. Threlkeld [1850]
- Part 2. The gospel by St. Luke translated into the language of the Awabakal / L.E. Threlkeld [1891]
- Part 3. An Awabakal-English lexicon to the gospel according to Saint Luke / L.E. Threlkeld [1892]
- Part 4.
  - Appendix A. A short grammar and vocabulary of the dialect spoken by the Minyung people of the north-east coast of New South Wales / H. Livingstone
  - B. Grammar of the language spoken by the Narrinyeri tribe in S. Australia / G. Taplin
  - C. Grammar of the language spoken by the aborigines of Western Australia
  - D. Grammar and vocabulary of the aboriginal dialect called the Wirradhuri
  - E. Prayers in the Awabakal dialect
  - F. Gurre Kamilaroi 'Kamilaroi sayings'
  - G. Specimens of a dialect of the aborigines of New South Wales : being the first attempt to form their speech into a written language.

== Death and legacy ==
Fraser died in the New Hebrides (now Vanuatu) in May 1904.
