= Geawegal =

Geawegal is the name for an Australian Aboriginal people who were recorded as inhabiting an area of the Hunter Valley in eastern New South Wales, north of Sydney. This identification has been recently questioned by Jim Wafer of Newcastle University, who also reconstructs the original name as Kayawaykal.

== Language ==
The Geawegal language would have been, according to Tindale, closely related to Gamilaraay. Surveying the literature, Jim Wafer says it is as yet unclear whether the linguistic affiliation, based on guesses from a mere 6 morphemes, links the language to a "Darling Tributaries" language' like Gamilaraay, or to a "Lower North Coast" language like Warrimay, or even a "Hunter River-Lake Macquarie language" (HRLM) like Awabakal.

The ethnonym appears to means "no-sayers" (geawe, held by Tindale to probably represent keawai = no, while -gal appears to be a "belonging" suffix), – the tribe being described by the negative word it employed- and if so, Tindale suggested that the more precise transcription of their name, given the prevalence of unvoiced consonants, might be Keawekal/Keawaikal. Wafer however argues that this is very close to kayaway is one of several alternative negative forms in HRLM, suggesting different language affinities than those suggested by Tindale. Horatio Hale, a philologist who took part in the United States Exploring Expedition led by Charles Wilkes, made the first description of their language.

== Country ==
The Geawegal were described by Rusden as occupying "part of the valley of the Hunter River extending to each lateral watershed, and from twenty-five to thirty miles along the valley on each side of Glendon." Disputing this, Tindale claimed they lived further to the north-west over an estimated 3,300 square miles (8,500 km^{2}) extending from the territory around the northern tributaries of the Hunter River to Murrurundi, and taking in Muswellbrook, Aberdeen, Scone and Mount Royal Range. Tindale's evidence for this, based upon an 1899 police survey questionnaire, has been challenged by Jim Wafer with regard to the Upper hunter River. Her concludes that 'the region attributed by Tindale to the "Geawegal" was in fact occupied by speakers of a dialect – which I call the "Upper Hunter dialect" – of the Darling Tributaries language.'

== People ==
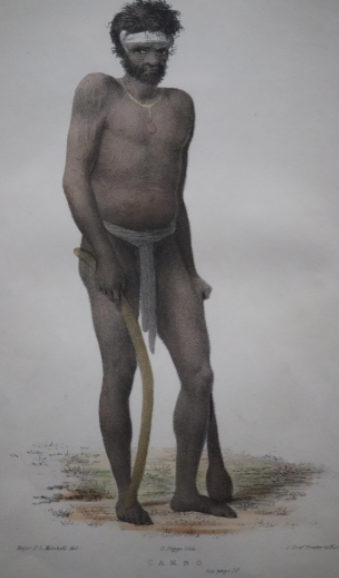
Cambo, Geawegal man, sketched by Sir Thomas Mitchell in 1831

Tindale affirms that the Geawegal had close affiliations with the neighbouring Warrimay, and were not to be confused with the Gweagal, an Eora horde that dwelt between Botany Bay and Port Jackson. Helen Brayshaw to the contrary considered them to form part of the Gamilaraay nation. Wafer contests this, while also challenging Tindale's two speculative identifications and suggests rather that they belong to the Hunter River-Lake Macquarie language group.

They married out with the aborigines of Maitland, to some extent with those of the Paterson River, and on exceptional occasions with the people around Muswellbrook. They greatly feared the Gamilaraay, who, according to some early reports, were wont to push down from the upper Hunter River and raid their territory as far as Jerrys Plains.

Their society was divided into at least two sections, Yipai and Kampu., (Note: It has been remarked that the same terms were current among the Wanarruwa, which may afford a clue as to the real affiliation of the Geawegal. (Wafer 2014, p. 61)) as opposed to the four recorded for the surrounding tribes, but this may simply reflect a failure of the informant's memory. Despite formally strict marriage rules, Fison and Howitt's informant told them that festive occasions involving wife-swapping took place among them. They were one of the tribes employing heralds to communicate with other, and sometimes distant tribes. These people were considered as sacred, and to be allowed free passage, even among hostile tribes. The victor who slew an enemy in a tribal fight would excise his hand and carry it for some time among the tribe as a trophy. When a warrior died, all of his fighting and hunting equipment was solemnly buried with his body.

== History ==
Tindale regards passages in the travelogue of the French explorer François Péron, writing in 1807, as constituting the first description of the Geawegal. Hale's observations in 1846 were written in good part from notes he gathered from interviews with Lancelot Threlkeld, but Wafer contends that Tindale errs in ascribing this data to the Geawegal. In 1880, by which time the tribe was thought to be extinct, Lorimer Fison and Alfred William Howitt wrote a short excursus on them, relying on information from G. W. Rusden, who had learnt the language in his youth.

== Dispute over their identification ==
Determining what tribes occupied the upper Hunter Valley region has long proved difficult, with maps of Australian tribal territories often leaving this particular area vacant. Despite Tindale's identification of an indigenous Geawegal people in this locality, many historical documents attest to the presence of the Gamilaraay in the same area, especially around the Hunter River headwaters and Murrurundi. It was Fison and Howitt who first provided this name for the tribe.

== Alternative names ==
- Geawagal, Garewagal
- Keawaikal/ Keawekal

Source: Tindale 1974

== Some words ==
- barrucun (boomerang)
- kuratji (witch doctor, medicine man)
- murramai/maRamay or maRama (a rock crystal invested with supernatural powers introduced during initiatory rites)

== Sources ==
- Brayshaw, Helen (1987). Aboriginals of the Hunter Valley (PDF). Vol. Bicentennial Publication No 4. Scone, New South Wales: Scone & Upper Hunter Historical Society.
- Fison, Lorimer; Howitt, Alfred William (1880). Kamilaroi and Kurnai: group-marriage and relationship, and marriage by elopement: drawn chiefly from the usage of the Australian aborigines: also the Kurnai tribe, their customs in peace and war. Melbourne: G. Robertson.
- Hale, Horatio (1846). "The Languages of Australia" (PDF). United States Exploring Expedition. During the years 1838,1839, 1840, 1841, 1842.Under the Command of Charles Wilkes. Philadelphia: Lea and Blanchard. pp. 479–531.
- Péron, François (1809) [First published 1807]. A Voyage of Discovery to the Southern Hemisphere, performed by order of the Emperor Napoleon, during the years1801, 1802, 1803, and 1804. London: Richard Phillips.
- Tindale, Norman Barnett (1974). "Geawegal (NSW)". Aboriginal Tribes of Australia: Their Terrain, Environmental Controls, Distribution, Limits, and Proper Names. Australian National University Press. ISBN 978-0-708-10741-6. Archived from the original on 6 March 2017.
- Wafer, Jim (2014). "Placenames as a guide to language distribution in the Upper Hunter, and the landnám problem in Australian toponomastics". In Clark, Ian D.; Hercus, Luise; Kostanski, Laura (eds.). Indigenous and Minority Placenames Australian and International Perspectives. Australilan National University. pp. 57–82. ISBN 9781925021622. JSTOR j.ctt13www5z.7.
