= Pangerang =

Indigenous people in Victoria, Australia

The Pangerang, also spelt Bangerang and Bangarang, are the Indigenous Australians who traditionally occupied much of what is now north-eastern Victoria stretching along the Murray River to Echuca and into the areas of the southern Riverina in New South Wales. They may not have been an independent tribal reality, as Norman Tindale thought, but one of the Yorta Yorta tribes. In fact, it appears that the term Pangerang was a Ngurrai-illam word to describe the Yorta Yorta people.

== Country ==
Pangerang lands were estimated by Norman Tindale to have covered some 6,700 square kilometres (2,600 mi^{2}), running through the lower Goulburn River valley and extending westwards to the Murray River. It covered areas east and west of Shepparton, taking in Kyabram. The southern reaches extend as far as Toolamba and Violet Town.

== History of contact ==
Some Pangerang were among the estimated 26 indigenous people killed by troopers at Moira Swamp/Lake Barmah on the 15 December 1843.

== Social structure ==
According to Norman Tindale, the Bangerang collective of tribes, or nation, also known as the Yorta Yorta, consists of eight hordes, though others have been included in the list.

- Moiraduban
- Waningotbun (at Kotupna)
- Maragan (perhaps Maraban)
- Owanguttha (Note: "There were eight well-defined hordes the names of which generally terminated in [-pan] or [-ban]. Curr and Mathews both show that Pangerang hordes extended a little way downriver from Echuca on both banks; these western hordes were called Jabalaljabala by downriver tribes. Three of Curr's Pangerang hordes are separated as the Kwatkwat. The hordes shown by Curr north of the Murray River belong to other tribes.")

We know somewhat more about the fish-loving Wongatpan and the opossum-hunting Towroonban, two Pangerang clans, simply because they happen to have been the tribes inhabiting the area where the ethnographer Edward Micklethwaite Curr took over his pastoral run.

=== Alternative names ===
- Panggarang, Pangorang, Pangurang, Pine-gorine, Pine-go-rine, Pinegerine, Pinegorong
- Bangerang, Banjgaranj
- Pallaganmiddah
- Jabalajabala (from the word jabala meaning no), a name applied to western Pangerang hordes)
- Yaballa, Yabula-yabula
- Waningotbun
- Maragan
- Owanguttha
- Yurt (exonym used by northerners and the Ngurelban, from jurta, meaning no)
- Yoorta
- Moiraduban
- Moitheriban
- Bangarang (Note: Mentioned by Tindale as derived from John Fraser (1892). According to Peter Sutton this spelling came from R.H. Mathews.)

== Sources ==
- Barwick, Diane E. (1984). McBryde, Isabel (ed.). "Mapping the past: an atlas of Victorian clans 1835–1904". Aboriginal History. 8 (2): 100–131. JSTOR 24045800.
- Bowe, Heather; Morey, Stephen (1999). The Yorta Yorta (Bangerang) language of the Murray Goulburn: including Yabula Yabula. Pacific Linguistics. ISBN 978-0-858-83513-9.
- Furphy, Samuel (2013). Edward M. Curr and the Tide of History. Australian National University. ISBN 978-1-922-14471-3.
- "Colonial Frontier Massacres in Australia, 1788-1930". University of Newcastle.
- Smyth, Robert Brough (1878). The Aborigines of Victoria: with notes relating to the habits of the natives of other parts of Australia and Tasmania (PDF). Vol. 1. Melbourne: J. Ferres, gov't printer – via Internet Archive.
- Sutton, Peter (2004). Native Title in Australia: An Ethnographic Perspective. Cambridge University Press. ISBN 978-1-139-44949-6.
- Threlkeld, L E; Fraser, John (1892). Fraser, John (ed.). An Australian language as spoken by the Awabakal, the people of Awaba, or lake Macquarie (near Newcastle, New South Wales) being an account of their language, traditions, and customs. Sydney: Charles Potter, Government Printer.
- Tindale, Norman Barnett (1974). Aboriginal Tribes of Australia: Their Terrain, Environmental Controls, Distribution, Limits, and Proper Names. Australian National University Press. ISBN 978-0-708-10741-6.
- West, Raymond (1962). Those Were the Days: A Story of Shepparton, Victoria, and to Some Extent, Its District. Waterwheel Press.
