= Miromaa Aboriginal Language and Technology Centre =

Miromaa Aboriginal Language and Technology Centre, formerly the Arwarbukarl Cultural Resource Association, is an Australian community organisation servicing the Awabakal people in coastal New South Wales. The organisation has developed a software program Miromaa, which means "saved" in Awabakal language, to provide the necessary skills to Aboriginal communities around Australia to assist in the preservation and dissemination of the endangered traditional languages of Aboriginal Australia.

In 2007, they came second in the Microsoft Unlimited Potential Innovation Award, and joint winner of the Australian Community ICT Award for software development.
