= Burigon =

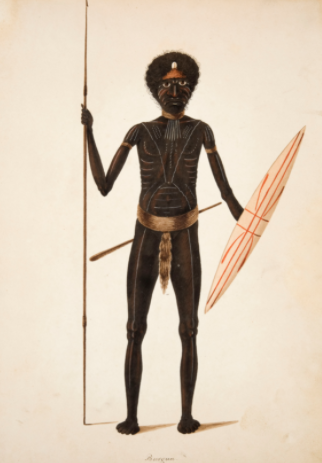
A painting of Burigon by Richard Browne

Burigon (died 1820), also called Burragong or Jack, was an Awabakal man and "Chief of the Newcastle Tribe".

Alongside his tribe, Burigon entertained Governor Macquarie with a corroboree at the site of the Newcastle Government House. Under the patronage of Commandant James Wallis, who was in charge of the British colonial post of Newcastle from 1816 to 1818, the convict artist Joseph Lycett painted at least 14 scenes of traditional practices of the Awabakal people. Burigon and James Wallis hunted together and Wallis was to later write that he had "kinder feelings" for Burigon than for many of his own heritage. This was despite the Commandant being previously responsible for the Appin Massacre of Aboriginal people a few years previously. This close relationship of Burigon and Wallis was instrumental in gaining access for the artist Joseph Lycett to visually document the life of the Awabakal people. Burigon re-named his eldest son Wallis after the Commandant, and allowed him to be taken to the Parramatta Native Institution to be educated in the British manner. The child was enrolled at the facility in 1818 at the age of 10, and remained in the Sydney region until the age of 19.

Burigon died October 27, 1820; he was fatally wounded at Newcastle when attempting to apprehend an escaped convict named John Kirby. Kirby was later arrested, convicted of wilful murder and executed in December 1820. Burigon's murder is the first legal case which resulted in the execution of a Caucasian man for the killing of an Aboriginal Australian.

== See also ==
- List of Indigenous Australian historical figures
