= Biraban =

Australian Aboriginal leader

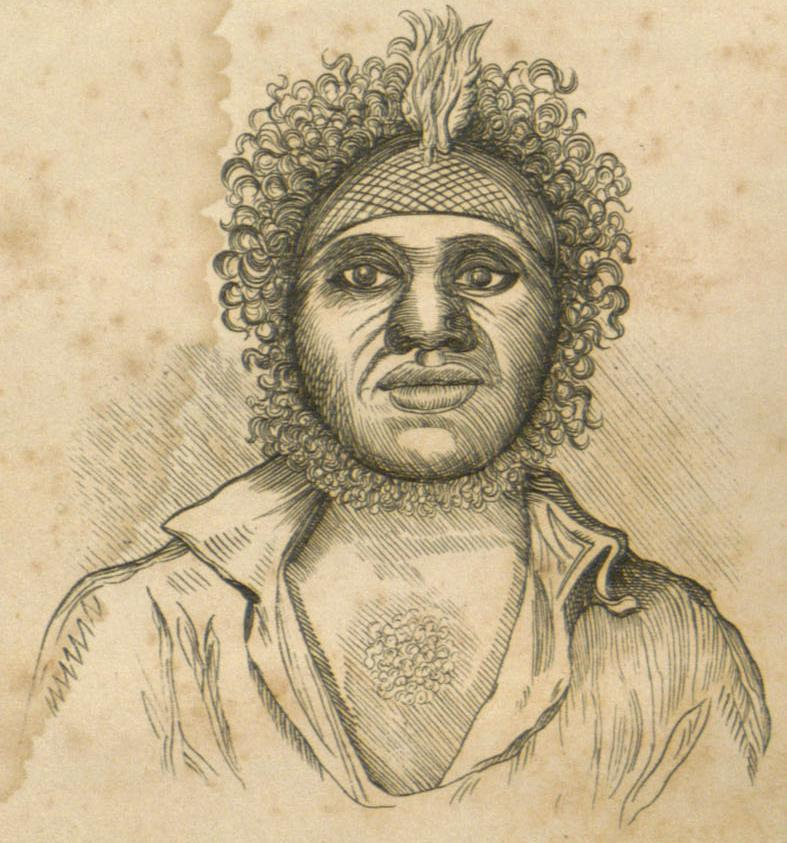
- Biraban, drawn by Alfred Thomas Agate.
- Born: c. 1800
- Died: 14 April 1846
- Other names: We-pohng, Barabahn, Bi-ra-ban, Biraban, John McGill, M'Gill, MacGil, Maggill.
- Spouse: Ti-pah-mah-ah (Patty)
- Children: Ye-row-wa

Biraban (c. 1800 – 14 April 1846) was a leader of the Awabakal people, an Aboriginal Australian people who lived in the area around what is today Lake Macquarie. His native name prior to Awabakal initiation was We-pohng; his naming as Biraban is reference to his totemic relationship with the eaglehawk.

== Early life ==
We-pohng was born at Bahtahbah (Belmont, New South Wales) c.1800. During his childhood We-pohng was abducted by the British and raised within the military barracks located in Sydney. Subsequently, We-pohng was assigned to Captain John M. Gill, a member of the 46th Regiment. We-pohng remained with Captain Gill from February 1814 until Captain Gill departed Australia in December 1817. It was at this time We-pohng became fluent in English and was bestowed the name M'Gill (and its derivatives) by the captain as "a mark of his claim on the boy."

We-pohng, with two other young Awabakal men named Bob Barrett and We-rah-kah-tah, were assigned to Captain Francis Allman in 1821 to assist in the establishment of a penal colony at Port Macquarie, assuming the role of regional guide, interpreter and a 'bush constable'. We-pohng, We-rah-kah-tah and Bob Barrett were utilised for their tracking skills to apprehend escaping convicts.

Prior to his return to Newcastle in 1825 We-pohng married Ti-pah-mah-ah, with whom he had one son, Ye-row-wa.

== Return to Awabakal ==
From 1825 Biraban served as an informant to the missionary Lancelot Edward Threlkeld teaching him the Awabakal language and cosmology.

In 1826 Biraban experienced his Awabakal clan initiation in which he was transposed from boyhood to manhood. Subsequently, Biraban acted as a spokesperson for the Awabakal clan, with part of his duties involving reporting 'assaults on Aboriginal people to Threlkeld who, in turn, reported them to the colonial authorities,' and acting as a distributor of British material goods to Aboriginal people.

Biraban assisted Threlkeld to establish a Mission of the London Missionary Society (LMS), and later the Colonial government Ebenezer (mission), on Awabakal land. In preparation for the LMS Mission Biraban worked alongside two other indigenous men to fell 'trees to make room for the erection of…[a mission] house and prepare for planting some Indian corn.'

== Linguistic and translation work ==
Speaking English fluently Biraban was frequently called upon by the colonial government to act as an interpreter between Aboriginal clan members and settlers. A notable work in which Biraban was involved was the interpretation and transcription of Christian religious texts into the Awabakal language. Threlkeld recognised the value of Biraban as his local teacher, writing, '[i]t was very evident that M'Gill [Biraban] was accustomed to teach his native language, for when he was asked the name of anything, he pronounced the word very distinctly, syllable by syllable, so that it was impossible to mistake it.' It was later admitted by Threlkeld that Biraban was crucial to his translation work, with the Awabakal translation and publication of the Gospel of Luke being 'principally translated by Macgill himself.'

Whilst translating Christian texts Biraban also shared with Threlkeld knowledge of Awabakal cosmology, detailing stories of Koun, Tippakal, Por-rang, and his personal life. Biraban also incorporated Christian theology into the Awabakal cosmological order, offering a dreaming narrative, to Threlkeld, concerning Jehovah; Biraban conceptualised Jehovah as an indigenous being which appears to only men. Biraban's authority within the Aboriginal clans and his ability to disseminate Christian beliefs to Aboriginal people positioned Biraban to be considered by Threlkeld as a missionary teacher, yet this plan was abandoned as Threlkeld felt Biraban was unable to be baptised due to his preference for alcoholic beverages.

By 1830 the value Biraban's translation work was widely acknowledged. Governor Sir Ralph Darling gifted to Biraban a brass plate with the inscription: Baraban, or Macgil, Chief of the Tribe at Bartabah, on Lake Macquarie: a reward for his assistance in reducing his Native Tongue to a written language. At this time Biraban was also active in Supreme Court translations with Threlkeld. Yet, despite being fluent in English, Biraban's non-Christian status resulted with the Court dismissing Biraban as a competent witness.

Biraban died in Newcastle on 14 April 1846. A short obituary recognising his achievements was written in the Sydney Morning Herald.

== Contemporary recognition ==
Biraban is the inspiration for the poem The Eagle Chief.

The Biraban Public School in Toronto recognises Biraban's connection to the region and work as leader and linguist.

In the Canberra suburb of Aranda Biraban is remembered with a street named in his honour.

The University of Newcastle hosts the Birabahn Cultural Trail and Birabahn Building.

== See also ==
- List of Indigenous Australian historical figures

== Bibliography ==
- Brisbane Water Historical Society; The Entrance and District Historical Society (1968). The Story of the Aboriginal People of the Central Coast of New South Wales. Wyong, New South Wales.
- Gunson, N., ed. (1974). Australian Reminiscences & Papers of L.E. Threlkeld Missionary to the Aborigines 1824-1859. Vol. I. Canberra: Australian Institute of Aboriginal Studies.
- Gunson, N. (ed.). Australian Reminiscences & Papers of L.E. Threlkeld Missionary to the Aborigines 1824-1859. Vol. II. Canberra: Australian Institute of Aboriginal Studies.
- Keary, A. (2009). "Christianity, colonialism, and cross-cultural translation: Lancelot Threlkeld, Biraban, and the Awabakal". Aboriginal History. 33: 117–155. JSTOR 24046826.
- Threlkeld, L. E. (1850). "Reminiscences of Birabān". A key to the structure of the Aboriginal language; Being an analysis of the particles used as affixes, to form the various modifications of the verbs; Shewing the essential powers, abstract roots, and other peculiarities of the language spoke by the Aborigines in the vicinity of the Hunter River, Lake Macquarie, etc., New South Wales: Together with comparisons of Polynesian and other dialects. Sydney: Kemp and Fairfax. pp. 5–7.
- Threlkeld, L. E. (1892). "The Key" (PDF). In Fraser, J. (ed.). An Australian Language as spoken by the Awabakal the people of Awaba or Lake Macquarie (Near Newcastle, New South Wales) Being an Account of Their Language, Traditions and Customs. Sydney: Charles Potter. pp. 83–104.
- van Toorn, P. (2006). Writing Never Arrives Naked: Early Aboriginal Cultures of writing in Australia. Canberra: Aboriginal Studies Press.
