= Harry Brown (explorer) =

Indigenous Australian explorer

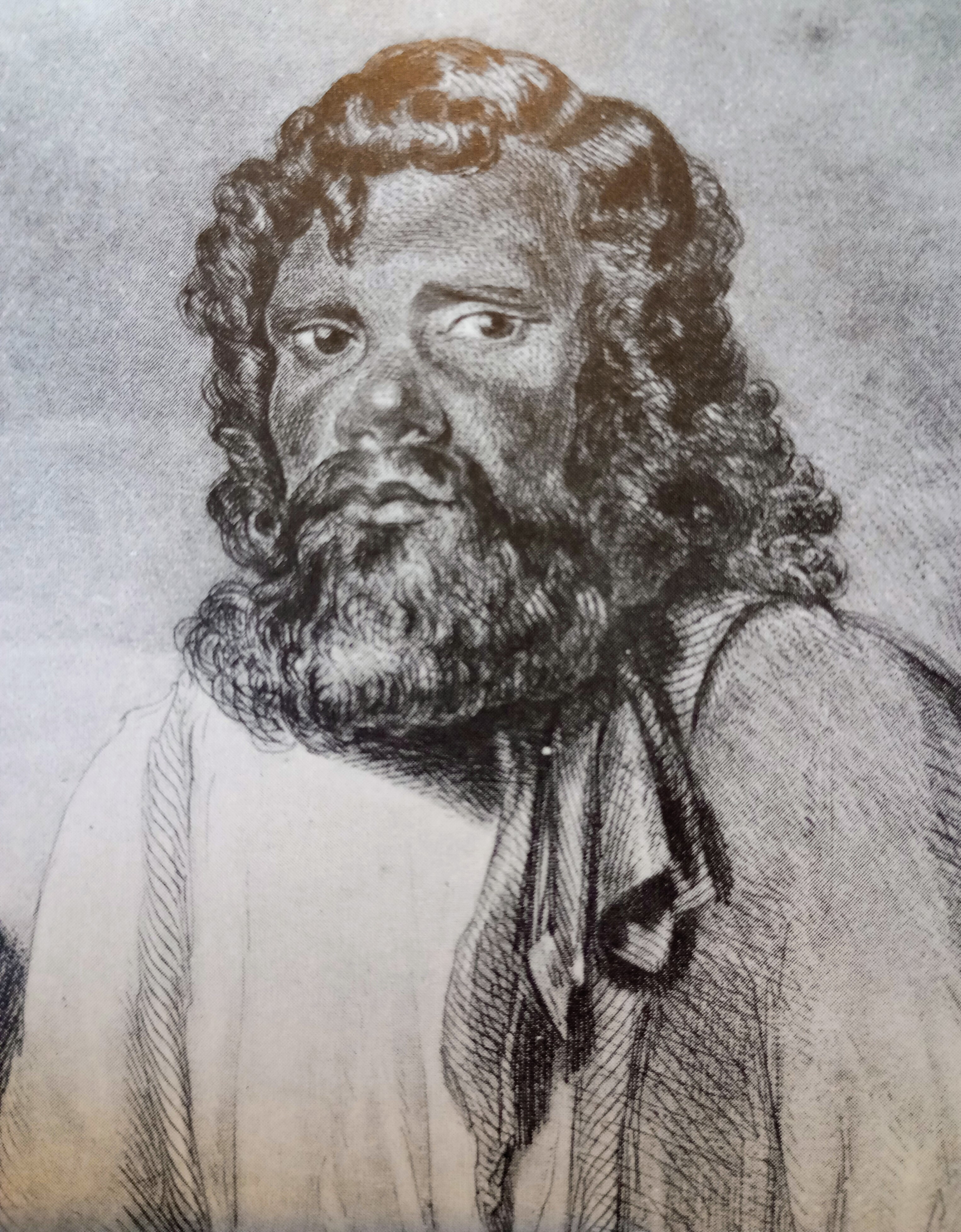
Harry Brown

Harry Brown (c. 1820 – 17 June 1854) was an Indigenous Australian Awabakal man from Newcastle, New South Wales, who became a pioneering explorer of what was later known as Queensland and the Northern Territory.

From 1844 to 1847, he guided and occasionally led two famous expeditions conducted by Ludwig Leichhardt through these regions. After Leichhardt went missing on a later expedition, Brown was chosen to be part of a search party in an attempt to discover the location and cause of his disappearance.

== Early life ==
Harry Brown, often referred to as just Brown, was born near Newcastle in the British colony of New South Wales in the year 1820. He was the son of an Awabakal man called Ngoakoro (also named by the British as "Moses"). Brown's mother is not documented and seems to have died while he was a young child. Brown's traditional name is also not documented.

== House servant and whaler ==
As an adolescent, Brown was employed as a house servant in Newcastle where he gained the general approval of the local colonists for being highly intelligent, honest and reliable. He was later contracted as a crew member on board various vessels in the local whaling industry.

== First expedition with Leichhardt ==
By 1844, Brown's reputation as a dependable and perceptive Aboriginal worker in colonial society must have influenced Ludwig Leichhardt in appointing him as a member of his expedition to explore the immense un-colonised area of north-eastern Australia between Moreton Bay and Port Essington. Leichhardt hired Brown, along with four white men, while they were both in Sydney in September 1844. After sailing to Moreton Bay, Leichhardt hired several additional people to join his expedition, including Charley Fisher, a Wiradjuri man who happened to be in area as a trooper for the Border Police.

Because Brown and Charley were Indigenous Australians, they were expected to guide and hunt food for the group, as well as take care of the horses and track the group's missing livestock. They were also expected to be the main communicators with Aboriginal people that they may encounter along the way.

Brown became Leichhardt's most reliable colleague during the expedition and was very important in providing food, water and guidance for the group. He also interacted with the local Aboriginal people that they met despite many language differences. Brown would sing and tell stories most evenings which Leichhardt found very comforting during a journey which had multiple hardships.

Despite Brown and Charley possibly having a causative role in the skirmish with a group of local First Nations people on the Mitchell River which resulted in the death of John Gilbert, they became even more essential to the group afterwards due to the sickness and injury acquired by the other expedition members.

After travelling along the coast of the Gulf of Carpentaria and through Kakadu, they eventually reached their destination of Port Essington on the Cobourg Peninsula. Brown was praised for his significant contribution to the success of the expedition.

== Second expedition with Leichhardt ==
In October 1846, Leichhardt again called upon Brown to participate in another expedition through the north-eastern regions of Australia. The expedition initially followed the same route as their first journey but due to problems of supplies of food and medicine, as well as the general sickness and discontent of most of the participants, Leichhardt decided to abandon the project and turn back.

Leichhardt became disorientated on the return journey and the responsibility of successfully guiding the expedition back to the colonised areas fell to Brown. He led the group back through the difficult terrain of the Expedition Range and finally to safety when they encountered British colonists at what is now Chinchilla, Queensland.

Brown appears to have had a falling out with Leichhardt during this journey due to Leichhardt's lack of leadership in a situation that involved their survival.

== Expedition to find Leichhardt ==
In 1848, Leichhardt again set out on a journey, this time to cross the Australian continent. Leichhardt's group was never heard of again. Fortunately for Brown he did not participate in this expedition.

In 1852, Hovenden Hely was appointed to lead an investigative expedition to try and discover what happened to Leichhardt and his fellow missing expeditioners. Hely, who travelled with Leichhardt in his second expedition, called on Brown to participate in the mission. Brown, who was working in the Wide Bay-Burnett region at the time, accepted the request.

The Hely expedition travelled west from the Darling Downs to the Maranoa River and encountered several local Aboriginal people who claimed they knew where Leichhardt's party had been killed by a group of Indigenous men. However, the informants were terrified that they would be shot by Hely's expeditioners and the claims were never verified. Brown again played an important role in assisting Hely's expedition.

== Death ==
Brown was given little recompense for his exploration efforts and returned to his home country around Newcastle. He died in June 1854 from burn injuries sustained after falling into a fire at the "Black's Camp" on Newcastle Beach several weeks earlier.

== Legacy ==
The modern day town of Rolleston, Queensland was built on the site of Brown's Lagoon which was named after Harry Brown. Brown Street in Rolleston is a continuation of his legacy in the pioneering of this district.

Brown's Peak in the Peak Range National Park was also named in his honour.

== See also ==
- List of Indigenous Australian historical figures
