= Awabakal =

Australian Aboriginal people of mid north coastal New South Wales

Awabakal people
- Awabagal, Awaba, Kuri, Minyowa, Minyowie
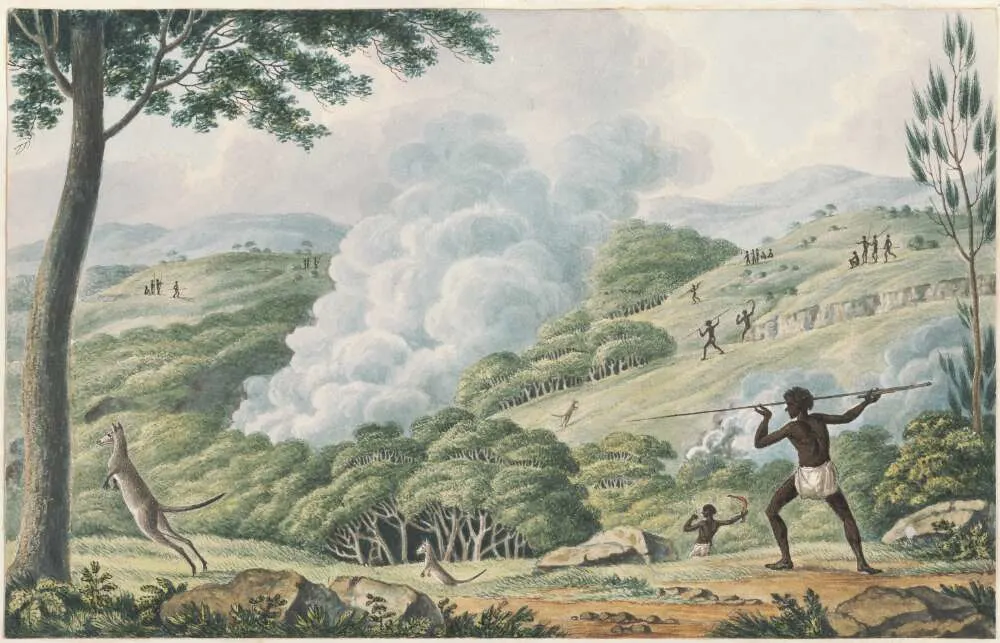
- Painting of Awabakal people using fire to hunt kangaroos by Joseph Lycett c.1817

Hierarchy
- Language family: Pama–Nyungan
- Language branch: Yuin–Kuric
- Language group: Kuri
- Group dialects: Awabakal

Area (approx. 1,800 km^{2} or 690 sq mi)
- Bioregion: Lower Hunter River and Lake Macquarie
- Location: Hunter Region, New South Wales
- Coordinates: 33°5′S 151°30′E
- Other geological: Lake Macquarie

Notable individuals
- Biraban; Bungaree; Harry Brown; Burigon

The Awabakal people /əˈwɒbəɡæl/, are a group of Indigenous Australians and their descendants from eastern Australia who speak the Awabakal language. Their traditional territory consists of the coastal area of New South Wales located between what is now known as the Hunter River and the Gosford region. This includes the Watagan Mountains to the west, Newcastle and Lake Macquarie to the north, and the Wyong and Tuggerah areas to the south.

== Name ==
The term Awabakal was first coined by the ethnologist John Fraser in 1892, who assisted in the publication of a thorough study on the Awabakal language by Lancelot Threlkeld. In this language, awaba was the word for Lake Macquarie, meaning flat or plain surface. With the addition of the suffix -kal, a term was created which referred to the people native to that area.

It is not known exactly how the Awabakal people collectively called themselves, but from their word for man, kuri, the term Kuri-nggai (also written as Ku-ring-gai or Guringai), has often been used as a collective denominator of the Awabakal and several other linguistically related coastal tribes in this region. Although the anthropologist Norman Tindale has challenged the validity of this classification, he agrees that the Kuri-nggai was synonymous with Awabakal. However, the linguist, Arthur Capell, asserted with minimal evidence that Kuri-nggai was a language distinct from Awabakal, which was spoken by the Garigal clan from the Broken Bay region.

According to Lancelot Threlkeld, the Indigenous people who occupied the coastal region north from Port Jackson to the lower Hunter River "all speak the same dialect" (ie. Awabakal). He further asserted that language of the Aborigines of Sydney and Botany Bay (ie. Eora or coastal Dharug) varied from Awabakal in only a slight degree.

In the present day, it is generally accepted that the language known as Awabakal was spoken by the coastal Indigenous people inhabiting the region from the lower Hunter River, south to Broken Bay. The people around the southern limits of this area, ie. the Garigal clan, may have spoken a dialect referred to as Kuri-nggai. Occasionally, the overall term Katungal is used to describe all the related local coastal languages, including Awabakal.

== Language ==
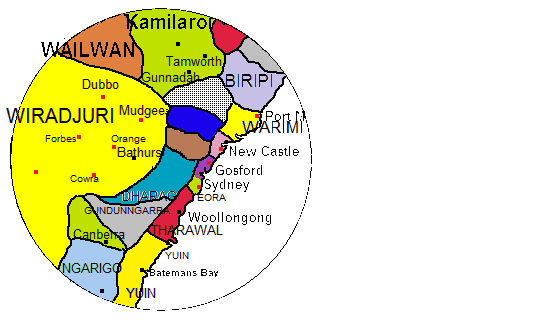
Traditional lands of Australian Aboriginal tribes around Newcastle, New South Wales

The Awabakal language was extensively studied and recorded in the 1830s by the missionary, Lancelot Threlkeld. He was able to do this mostly through his close association with a leading Awabakal man called Biraban. Threlkeld's work was published under the title An Australian language as spoken by the Awabakal, the people of Awaba or Lake Macquarie. This collection was one of the first comprehensive records of any Indigenous language in Australia.

From this study, Awabakal terms for well known local geographical locations can be derived:

- Mulubinba (place of a type of fern called mulubin) – Newcastle
- Whibayganba – Nobbys Head
- Tahlbihn – Flagstaff Hill (Fort Scratchley)
- Burrabihngarn – Pirate Point (Stockton)
- Yohaaba – Port Hunter
- Coquun (from Koko-in meaning fresh water) – Hunter River
- Khanterin – Shepherds Hill (The Hill)
- Toohrnbing – Ironbark Creek
- Bo-un – Maitland
- Kotara (meaning club or waddy) – Kotara
- Tukkara (meaning cold or winter) – Tuggerah Lakes
- Puntei (meaning narrow peninsula) – Coal Point
- Burraghihnbihng – Hexham Swamp
- Warrawallug (meaning human head) - Mount Warrawolong
- Killibinbin (meaning bright, glorious) - Kilaben Bay
- Biddabah (meaning place of rest) – Warners Bay

The general term, Koori, used in modern times to describe Indigenous Australians from all of southeast Australia, comes from the Awabakal word, kuri, meaning man.

== Country ==
The Awabakal were bounded to the northwest by the Wonnarua, the Worimi to the northeast, the Darkinung peoples to the west, and the Dharug-Eora to the south. This region includes what is now Newcastle, Lake Macquarie, Wyong, Tuggerah and Gosford.

Tindale estimated Awabakal territory to cover some 1,800 square kilometres (700 mi^{2}). More recent estimates are that Awabakal territory covers 2870 square kilometres.

== Clans ==
During the early stages of British colonisation, the Awabakal were categorised into several tribes and clans based upon location as follows:

Awabakal Tribe:

- Ash Island clan (located around what is now Kooragang Island)
- Pambalong clan (located around what is now Hexham Swamp)
- Five Islands/Mount Sugarloaf clan (located around the north of Lake Macquarie and Mount Sugarloaf)
- Bahtahbah clan (located around Newcastle and south along the eastern side of Lake Macquarie)
- Kurungbong clan (located around what is now the Cooranbong area)
- Bo-un or Wallis Plains clan (located around what is now Maitland)

Kuringgai Tribe:

- Tuggerah clan (located around the Tuggerah Lakes)
- Wyong clan (located around Wyong River)
- Narara clan (located around what is now Gosford)
- Erinan/Walkeloa clan (located around what is now Woy Woy and Erina)
- Terrigal clan (located around what is now Terrigal)
- Garigal clan (located around Broken Bay)

As noted previously, there is some speculation that the Kuringgai tribe was distinct, however most researchers regard this tribe as being linguistically and culturally contiguous with Awabakal.

== Culture and traditions ==
=== Beliefs ===
The eaglehawk or wedge-tailed eagle has special significance for the Awabakal people. Ko-un, their "celestial entity" or creator figure, looks like an Aboriginal man, but in flight resembles an eagle-hawk.

Nobbys Head (Whibayganba) at the entrance of the Hunter River was traditionally believed to be the home of an immense subterranean kangaroo that occasionally shakes himself causing local earthquakes.

An important creation story is that of Belmont Lagoon being formed by the tears of the moon. The male moon spirit named Pontoebung became saddened by not being as radiant and appreciated as the female sun spirit named Punnal. He withdrew in loneliness for days and began to weep, his tears falling back down to earth forming Belmont Lagoon. Pontoebung eventually decided to return and as he got closer to earth, he heard the Awabakal people rejoicing. They were happy that a freshwater lagoon had been formed, which made him overjoyed. He could see his full reflection in the water and his happiness made his face beam. From then on, whenever the moon passed over Belmont Lagoon, Pontoebung would shine his brightest and the Awabakal clans would hold a large corroborree to honour his brightness.

A small lake now known as Freemans Waterhole, was called Wauwarun by the Awabakal and they believed it to be unfathomable while also containing a man-eating monster named wauwai. A similar monster lived in the depths around Pulbah Island in Lake Macquarie.

=== Food and land management ===
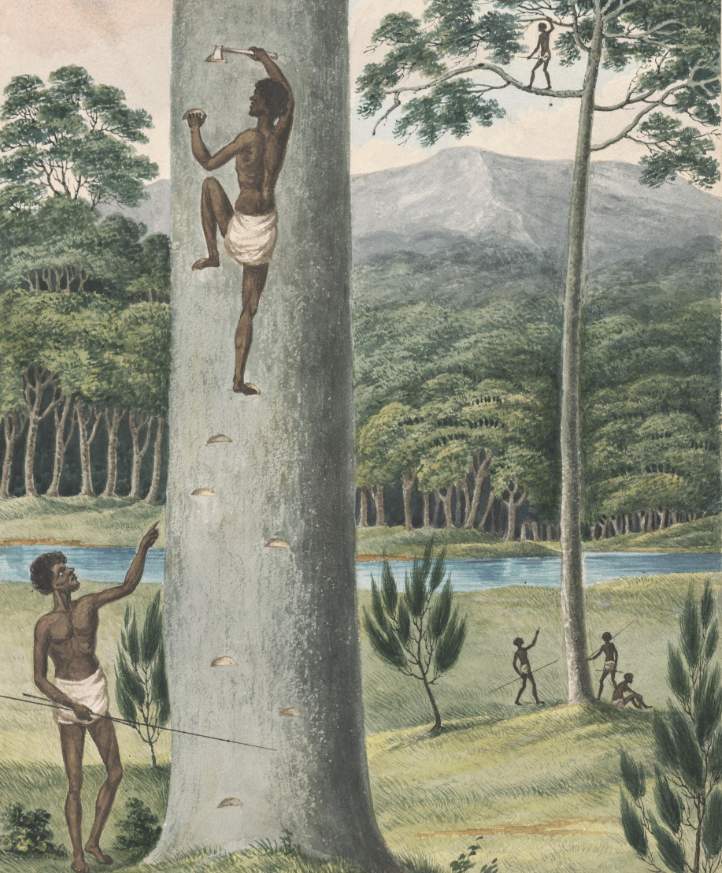
Painting by Joseph Lycett of an Awabakal man climbing a tree by cutting steps into the trunk in order to hunt possum c.1820

Like other First Nations Australian people, the Awabakal played a significant part in shaping the environment of their region. They practised fire-stick farming extensively, which helped them to hunt and to navigate through dense prickly scrub along the coast and riverways. One of Newcastle's main city thoroughfares, Watt Street, was built over an Awabakal path from the shore to the top of a hill.

The abundant possum (willai) was the main source of daily protein, and was hunted through trapping and by climbing trees with the assistance of a small stone axe (baibai) to cut footholds into the trunk. They also hunted kangaroo (moani) and emu (kogkorog) by using fire (koiyug) to flush the animals out into the open where they would be killed by boomerang (turruma), waddy (kotara) or spear (wairai).

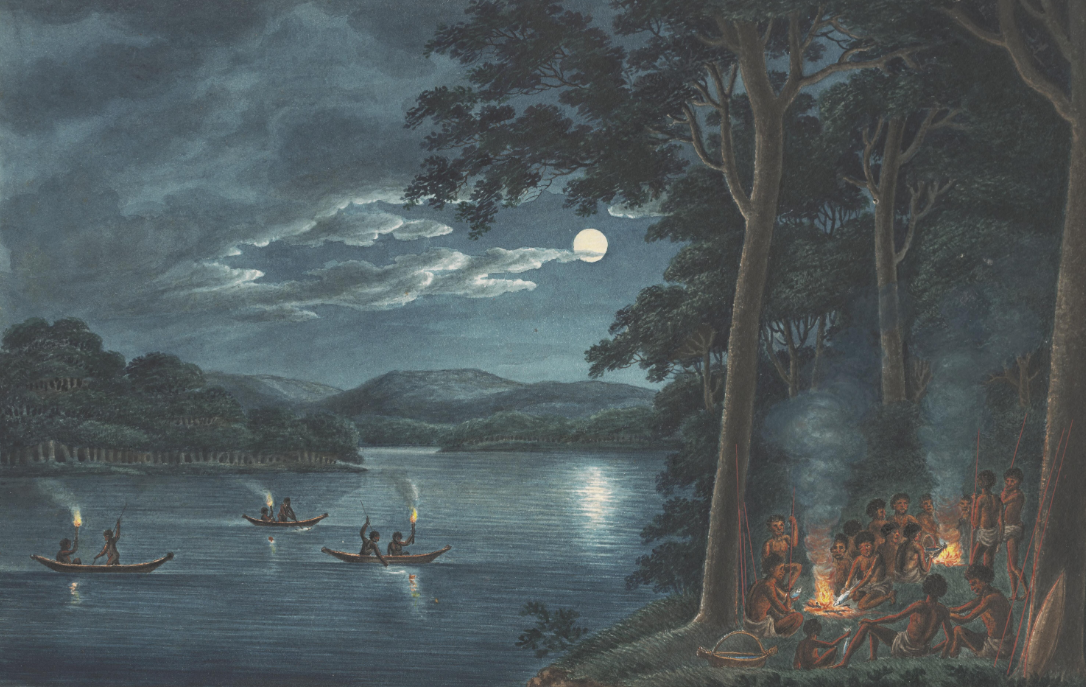
Painting of Awabakal people night fishing with fire torches on Lake Macquarie by Joseph Lycett c.1817

Fishing, particularly for oysters (munbonkan), was a significant part of the Awabakal people's diet and culture pre-colonisation. The Awabakal also caught fish (makoro) using hook-and-line or a specialised fish spear called a motig or kullara. They also hunted waterfowl such as the black swan (kunbul) and ate turtle (yunug), eel (kaneen) and whale (toroggun) when the opportunity arose. Fishing from bark canoes (cooeyung) was often done at night (tokoi) with the assistance of a flame torch. The fish were cooked in the canoe on a small clay hearth.

Various root vegetables such as the waiyog and kokobai were harvested for carbohydrate, as was the honey (kirika) of the native bee (nukkung). The young flower stems and the roots of the gymea lily were also roasted and used as food.

The red-gum sap of various trees such as Corymbia gummifera was melted and applied as a medical ointment to skin conditions. Awabakal people generally went naked but wore cloaks of possum or kangaroo fur when cold.

=== Ceremonial rites ===
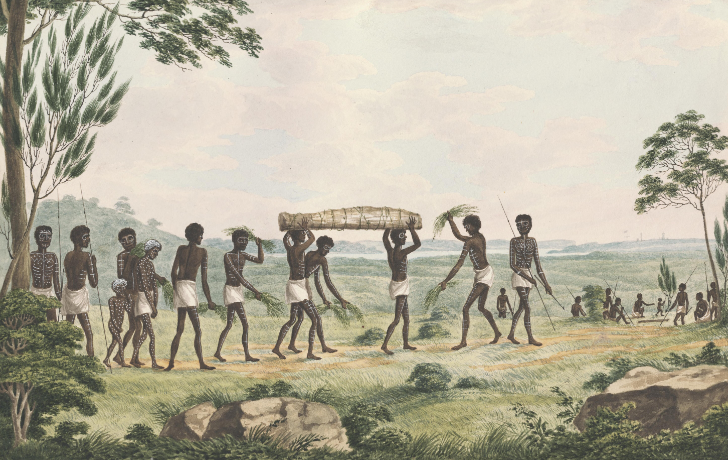
Painting of an Awabakal funeral procession by Joseph Lycett c.1817

The Awabakal practised initiation rites on adolescent males whereby tooth avulsion was performed in a ceremonial area called a yulung. The removal of the tooth was done to condition the youths to pain and also protect them from the evil spirit named Puttikan.

In regards to death, the Awabakal performed both burial and cremation rites dependent upon the situation. If burial was performed, the corpse would be wrapped in sheets of paperbark and placed in a sandy grave lined with soft leaves. The mourners would decorate themselves with a white ochre called pitto.

=== Poetry and song ===
As with many other First Nation Australian peoples, the Awabakal would transmit knowledge and entertainment through large singing and dancing ceremonies performed at night generally known as corroborees. An Awabakal man named Wullati was a respected composer of verse for these ceremonies and an extract of one of his poems was recorded:

Nung-ngnun nge a runba wonung bulkirra umbilinto bolwarra! Pital burra kultan wirripang buntoa.
Nung-ngnun nge a runba turrama berrambo, burra kilkoa; kurri wi raratoa yella walliko, yule moani, woinyo, birung poro bulliko.

(Here is a song of our home where the hills join on high! A joyful place where the eagle strikes.
Here is a song of our home where the boomerang lies like a resting serpent, and the fluttering of the pigeon's wings sweeps the wallaby's footprint from the glistening grass.)

=== Conflict, justice and diplomacy ===
The Awabakal, in pre-colonisation times, were noted as being strong and determined defenders of their territory. They had possession of the coastal territory for thousands of years, during which time they successfully repelled incursions by the neighbouring Gamilaraay people and established places of defence, "virtual armouries", high in the Watagan Mountains. The wommera spear-throwing tool is derived from the Awabakal word wommurur.

If a crime or transgression was deemed to have occurred, the culprit would be made to stand and face a pre-determined number of spears thrown in his direction with only a small wooden shield known as a koreil for protection.

Awabakal people were in regular contact with the Worimi to the north and the Eora and Dharug to the south, and travel to these areas was not uncommon. Awabakal messengers and ambassadors were readily identified by being painted with red ochre and having their long hair tied up in a conical form.

=== Population ===
The overall population of the Awabakal at the onset of British invasion and colonisation is uncertain but has been estimated to have been around 1,500 people. This figure is likely to be an underestimate due to the British introduction of smallpox early on in the colonisation process in 1789. The release and spread of the disease from Port Jackson just to the south of traditional Awabakal lands has been estimated to have caused a mortality rate of around 50% of the Aboriginal people residing in an extensive area of southeastern Australia.

== History since colonisation ==
=== Early encounters with the British ===
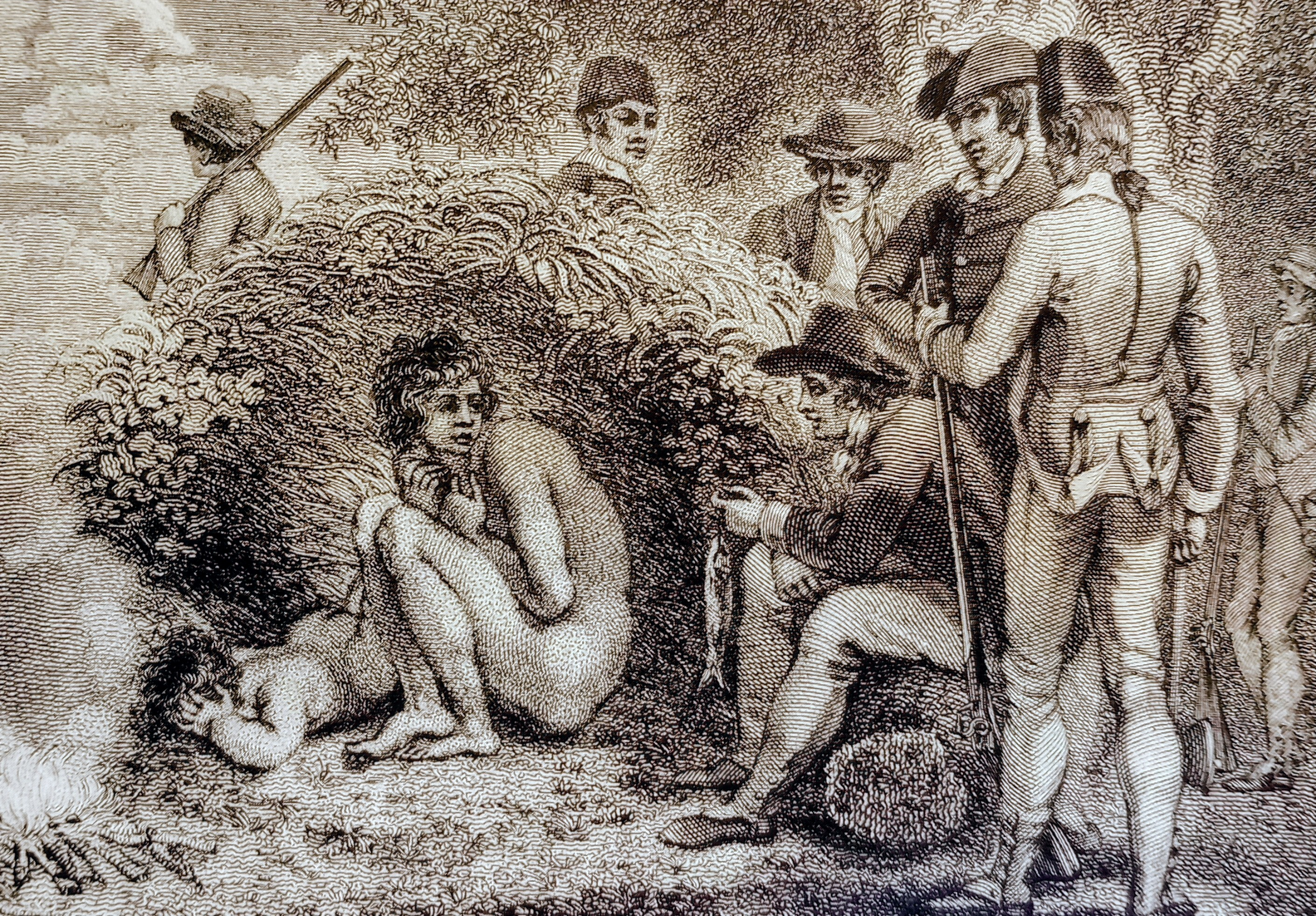
Sketch by Captain John Hunter of the encounter with a Garigal woman suffering from smallpox at Pittwater in 1789

The first documented contact between the two cultures appears to have occurred in June 1789, when Governor Arthur Phillip and Captain John Hunter led a party of ten men to explore Broken Bay. They encountered a Garigal woman recovering from smallpox at Pittwater and conversed with around twenty Aboriginal people whom they met within the shoaly harbour later known as Brisbane Water. These people spoke words such as baato (water) and makoro/magro (fish) which are shared in the Awabakal and Eora languages.

In 1796, a fishing vessel from the military convict outpost at Sydney was driven by bad weather into a river-mouth at what is now Newcastle, New South Wales. The fishermen found considerable amounts of coal there, but "conducted themselves improperly" while ashore, causing conflict with the Awabakal. Two of the fishermen were subsequently wounded, one of them fatally.

The colonists soon started to send vessels to the Hunter River to extract coal and cedarwood. In March 1799, the colonial enforcer, Henry Hacking, was ordered to investigate claims of British sailors being trapped at the mouth of the Hunter River. Hacking encountered a group of Awabakal men who informed him that the sailors had departed endeavouring to walk back to Sydney. Hacking did not believe them, and became agitated, shooting dead three Awabakal men. The sailors in question did in fact later arrive in Sydney, having walked the distance.

In 1800, Captain William Reid, looking for a cargo of coal, mistakenly sailed his vessel into the entrance of Lake Macquarie thinking it was the Hunter River. His crew encountered a group of Awabakal men who guided them to nearby areas of accessible coal.

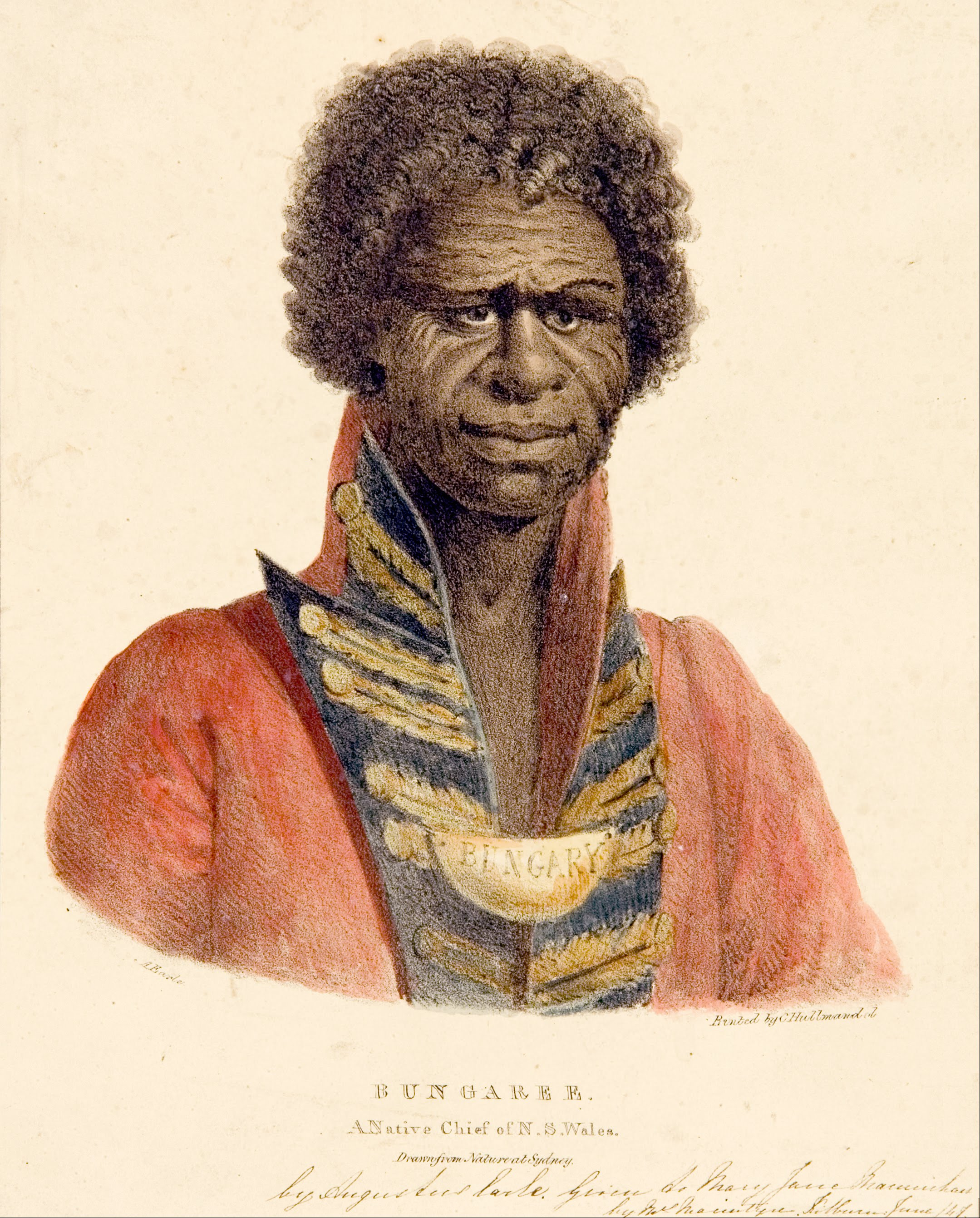
Bungaree

By the late 1790s, a few Awabakal men had travelled to Sydney and become known to the British officers there. In particular, Bungaree, whose mother was from the lower Hunter River and whose father was from the northern side of Broken Bay, was attracted to the European society and taken on as a sailor on a British vessel. He came to the attention of Matthew Flinders who took Bungaree on several voyages, most notably the circumnavigation of Australia in 1801-1803.

Bungaree also assisted in the establishment of the convict colony at Newcastle in the early 1800s by acting as a guide to the British and a mediator to his Awabakal countrymen. In 1804, he was employed around Newcastle in tracking down and capturing escaped convicts. Bungaree's father was killed by one of these escaped prisoners during an attempted recapture.

=== Life under British military rule ===
The founding of the convict military outpost at Newcastle had overt consequences for many Awabakal people. Besides the dislocation from land and sea resources in the immediate region, the influx of hundreds of armed soldiers and desperate prisoners, both with predispositions to violence and racism, had clear negative outcomes for the wider Awabakal community. The outpost was also male-dominated, and a trend was soon established where Awabakal females were forcibly taken for sexual purposes by soldiers, convicts and cedar-getters, resulting in the spread of venereal diseases, frequent assaults and death.

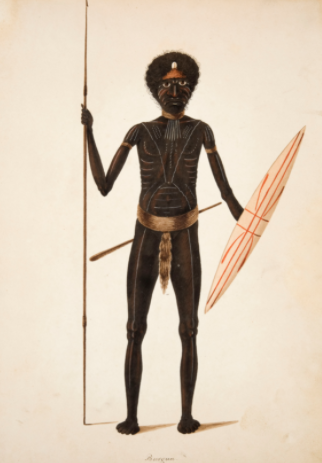
Burigon

However, the commandants in charge of Newcastle also found the local Awabakal useful as guides, servants and as trackers of escaped convicts. Those who worked for the British in this manner were rewarded with food, tobacco and clothing for them and their immediate clan-members. Bungaree, Bob Barrett, Werakata and Burigon were some of the men who took on the role of trackers, and with the patronage of the commandants, they obtained a degree of both protection and celebrity. Safety was never guaranteed though in the brutal colonial world, and Burigon was eventually murdered by a convict in 1820.

Awabakal children were also taken by some of the officers to be servants. One boy was taken by Lieutenant John McGill to Sydney where he was taught English and accustomed to British colonial ways. The boy was given the name McGill, but after returning to his homeland, he underwent initiation, became known as Biraban and went on to be an important leader of the remaining Awabakal.

Despite the upheaval, some Awabakal people were still able to conduct a traditional lifestyle away from the convict outpost. Paintings produced by artists such as Joseph Lycett show customary hunting and ceremonial rites being performed at least until 1819.

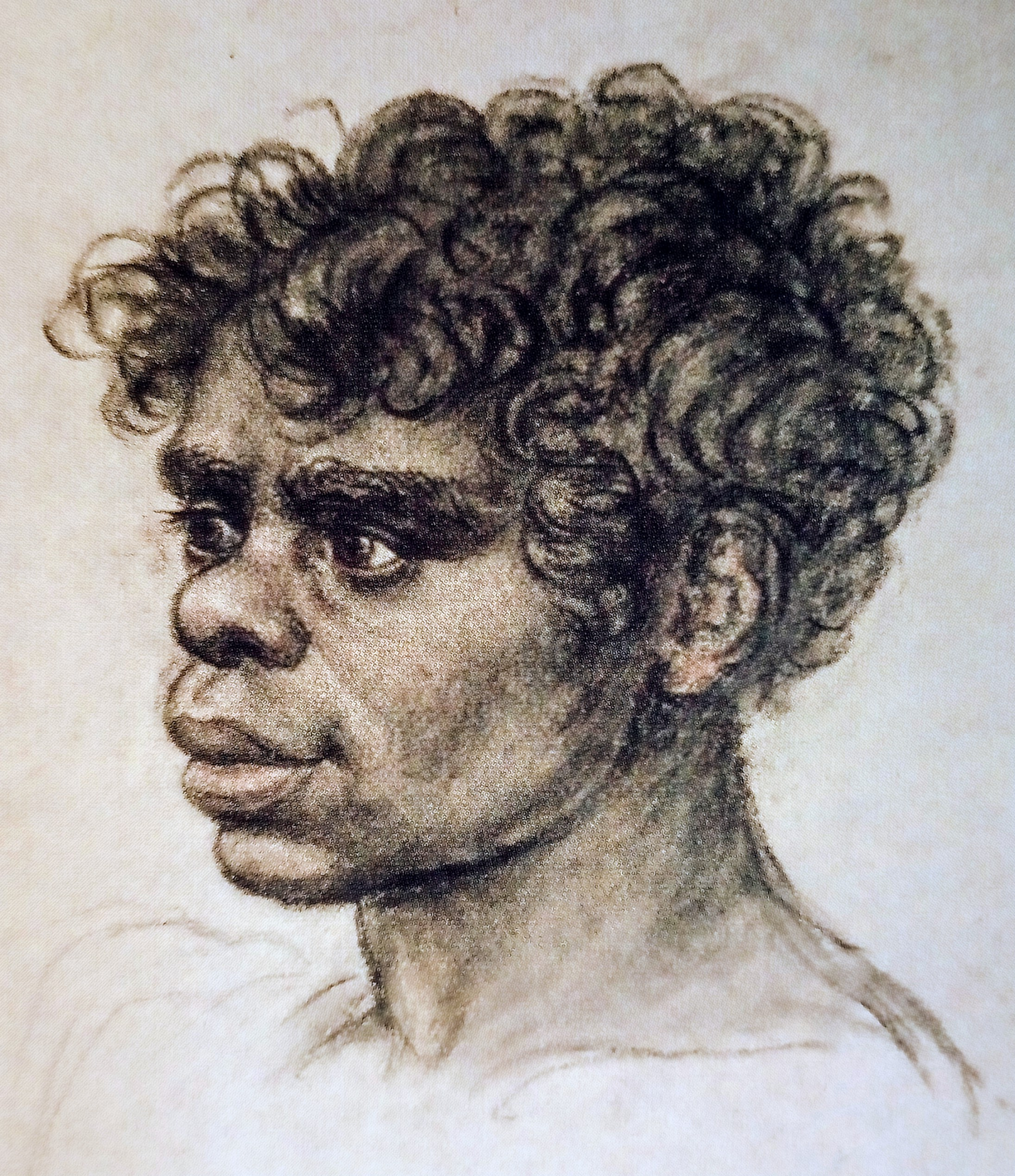
Bo-un "Bowen" Bungaree

Conversely, those who relinquished their traditional ways and became usefully associated with the British were sometimes rewarded significantly. For instance in 1815, Governor Lachlan Macquarie gave Bungaree a fishing boat, a formal title of "King of his Tribe" and granted him and his small clan a reserve of land on Sydney Harbour at Georges Head. Bungaree and his kin were subsequently able to live relatively comfortably off-country in Sydney. Bungaree's adult son, Bo-un (Bowen) Bungaree, was likewise given patronage by Macquarie in 1821, and was able to reside in the Maitland region with around 30 followers in comparative safety. Bowen's name was derived from Bo-un, the Awabakal word associated with the Maitland area.

=== The coming of settlers and missionaries ===
The Newcastle convict colony was closed in 1823 and the traditional lands of the Awabakal were made available for wider British settlement. This brought a new stage of dispossession and disaster for the Awabakal people. In 1825, Percy Simpson took up land at Cooranbong and Dora Creek, William Cape appropriated land at Wyong, while Frederick Augustus Hely was granted a large parcel of property around Gosford. All these areas were the heartlands of several Awabakal clans, from which they were ejected.

In 1826, the Reverend Lancelot Threlkeld established a Christian mission to the Awabakal people on behalf of the London Missionary Society on the eastern side of Lake Macquarie around what is now Belmont. He befriended a young man named Biraban of the local Bahtahbah clan, who understood English and enabled Threlkeld to interact with the Awabakal and learn their language. Threlkeld moved the mission site across the lake in 1830 to what is now Toronto and Coal Point.

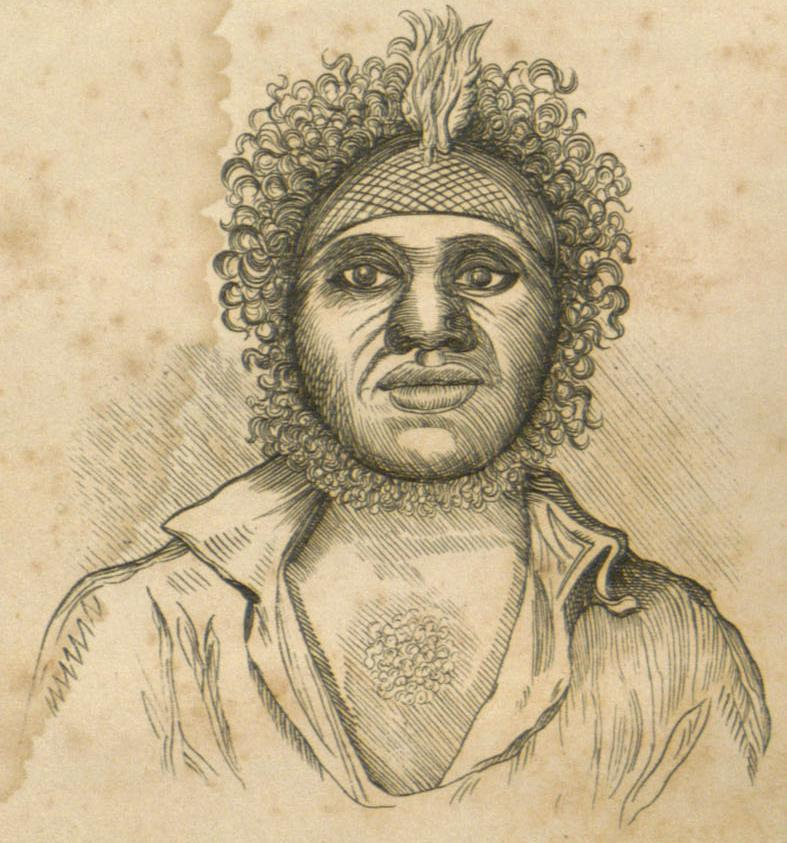
Biraban

Threlkeld failed to convert any Awabakal to Christianity but he had sufficient sympathy to document the abuses committed against them by the settlers. He recorded the regular kidnapping, assault and rape of Awabakal girls under the age of ten by Englishmen, and the beating and killing of Indigenous adults who would try to prevent this occurring. He also wrote how the settlers viewed the Awabakal as baboons while forcing dispossession, disease, alcoholism, prostitution and premature death upon them. Despite Threlkeld notifying the authorities of these crimes, the highly prejudicial status of British law against Aboriginal people ensured no meaningful action was taken.

Many Awabakal people were soon driven to becoming fringe dwellers at Newcastle where they subsisted as beggars, casual labourers and prostitutes for the white townspeople. Although this influx into the town was noticeable in 1829, the outcome of being paid mostly in cheap alcohol and tobacco had dire consequences for most.

=== Military and police operations against the Awabakal ===
The brutal process of displacement forced upon the Awabakal also compelled some into active resistance. As early as 1824, an Awabakal man the colonists called "Bumblefoot" was jailed for the attempted murder of a stockman near Swansea Heads and the stealing of his musket.

By 1826, the newly established regiment of horse soldiers known as the New South Wales Mounted Police was operating in the region, where it was obtaining a reputation of extrajudicial killings of suspected Wonnarua resistance leaders in the Hunter Valley. In 1832, these mounted soldiers were conducting a campaign of terrorism against the Awabakal throughout the Lake Macquarie and Brisbane Water districts, raiding camps, burning possessions, flogging people and shooting suspected thieves. On one occasion, a heavily pregnant woman was seized near Fennell Bay, handcuffed and made to walk to Maitland for interrogation. The dread of the Mounted Police forced many Awabakal into hiding, but convinced others to fight.

In 1833 and 1834, at least three bandit groups of Awabakal had formed, raiding various cattle and sheep stations in the district for food, clothing and weapons, with one gang even holding-up Threlkeld's mission. After one of these groups raided a property near Wyong and sexually assaulted a convict servant, the local settlers, including Threlkeld, petitioned the authorities to take vigorous action against these gangs. The colonial authorities officially designated 23 Awabakal men and one Awabakal woman as wanted outlaws, placing a £10 reward on each for their capture, and gave Jonathan Warner, a former officer in the British army, the duty of crushing these gangs. With the assistance of mounted troops sent from Sydney, Warner went about this task.

Warner (after whom the suburb of Warners Bay is named) stated that he might be obliged to shoot some of "the blacks" as both part of the operation and to keep the "natives in terror". In late 1834, he led a number of raids on various Awabakal camps throughout the Brisbane Water and Lake Macquarie regions, capturing several supposed ringleaders and shooting and wounding an undocumented number of others. Around the same time, the police magistrate in Newcastle, George Brooks, ordered a surprise raid on the Aboriginal camp at Baker's Island which resulted in an Awabakal man named Young Moses being shot dead and others, including women and children, being wounded.

Warner's operation was completed in December 1834, resulting in 18 Awabakal prisoners being held in Sydney Gaol. After a series of trials, a man named Mickey Mickey was sentenced to death for the rape of the convict servant and eight others were sentenced to hard labour on Goat Island. At least one man, named Jack Jones, died in jail before sentencing from injuries sustained after being shot in the neck while being arrested.

Mickey Mickey was publicly executed by hanging at the jail on George Street, Sydney in February 1835. It took 12 minutes for him to die. Four others died within a year while under sentence at Goat Island. In 1836, the remaining four surviving prisoners were transferred to Threlkeld's mission on Lake Macquarie. They absconded within a week.

=== Awabakal people during the 1840s and 1850s ===
By 1839 there was estimated to be only around 150 Awabakal people alive in the Newcastle, Lake Macquarie and Gosford areas. No longer a threat to British colonisation, most lived in severe poverty on the edges of white society. Even the missionary Lancelot Threlkeld abandoned them after establishing a profitable coal mining business on the mission site at Coal Point. He shut the mission and moved to Sydney in 1841.

A few Awabakal men, such as William Burd, were able to obtain employment as black trackers working for the police in capturing bushrangers. However, in order to get paid the few shillings earned for each prisoner, the trackers had to travel first to Newcastle for the receipt and then to Sydney to receive the cash. Burd quit the job after only a year.

Others like Bo-un "Bowen" Bungaree and Biraban still had a degree of status in the European world and were thereby able to survive for a time. Bo-un was occasionally employed as a blacktracker but lived mostly in Sydney working as a fisherman. He had previously joined the surveyor John Oxley as a guide during his maritime expedition in 1823 to what is now Queensland. In 1849, Bo-un and five other Awabakal men from Broken Bay were employed as sailors on a vessel taking prospectors to the California gold rush. Bo-un was the only one of his kin to return alive from San Francisco. He later died at Sydney in 1853.

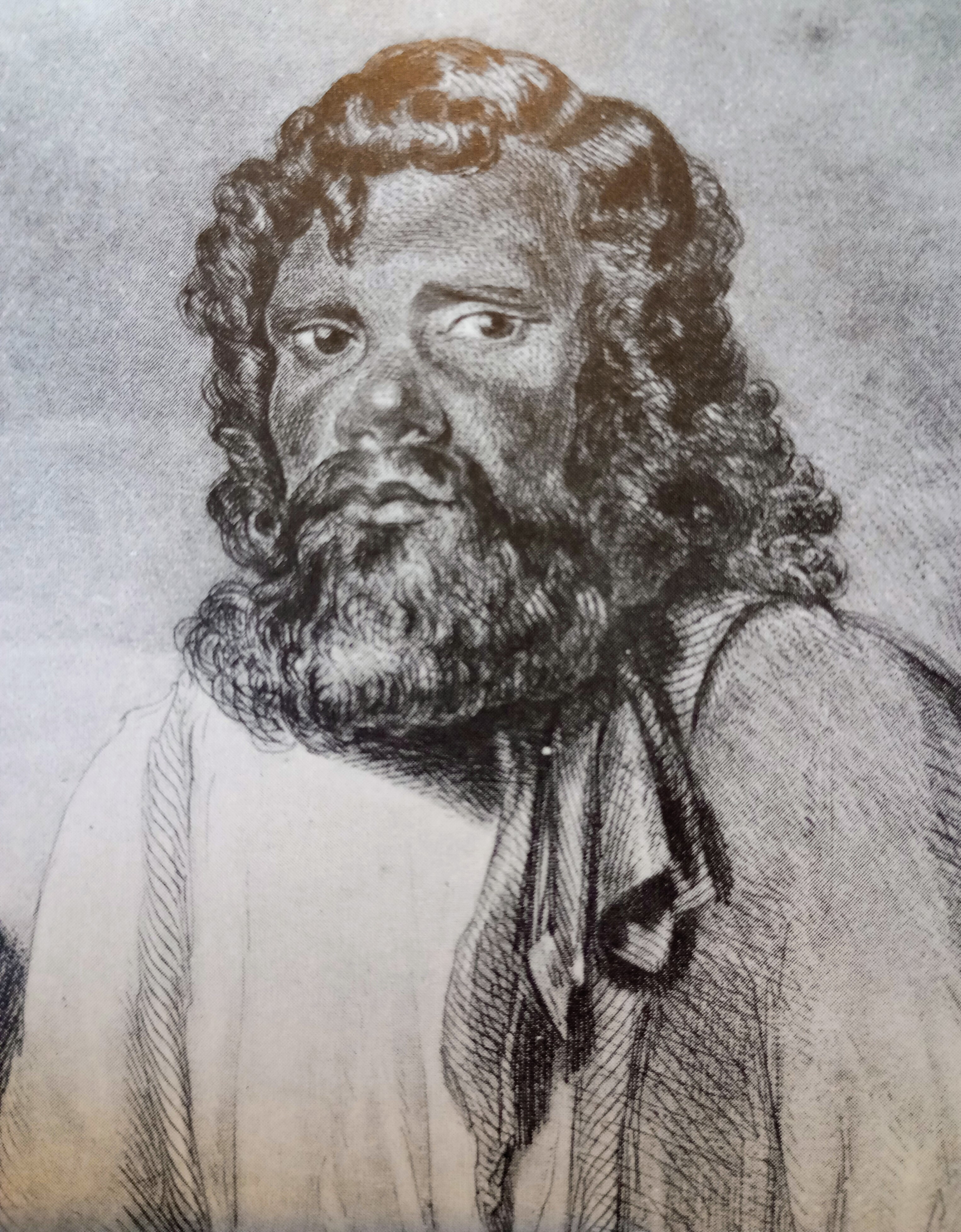
Harry Brown

Biraban also worked for period as a blacktracker in Port Macquarie and as a court translator in Sydney, but mostly stayed on country around Newcastle. He worked there as a language assistant and labourer for Rev Lancelot Threlkeld and also as a guide to various visitors. In 1846, he was recorded as one of thirty remaining Awabakal living at Newcastle in homeless destitution, begging for an old blanket or a coat. He died later that year.

Harry Brown was another Awabakal man who achieved a degree of celebrity after being chosen by Ludwig Leichhardt as a guide for his pioneering expedition across the interior of Australia to Port Essington. Brown successfully completed this journey in 1845 and took on a major role in another of Leichhardt's explorations in 1846. He also assisted Hovenden Hely in an 1852 expedition to try and find Leichhardt after the explorer went missing. Brown was given little recompense for his efforts and died from burns after falling into a fire at the "Black's Camp" on Newcastle Beach in 1854.

=== "Black Ned" and "Margaret" ===
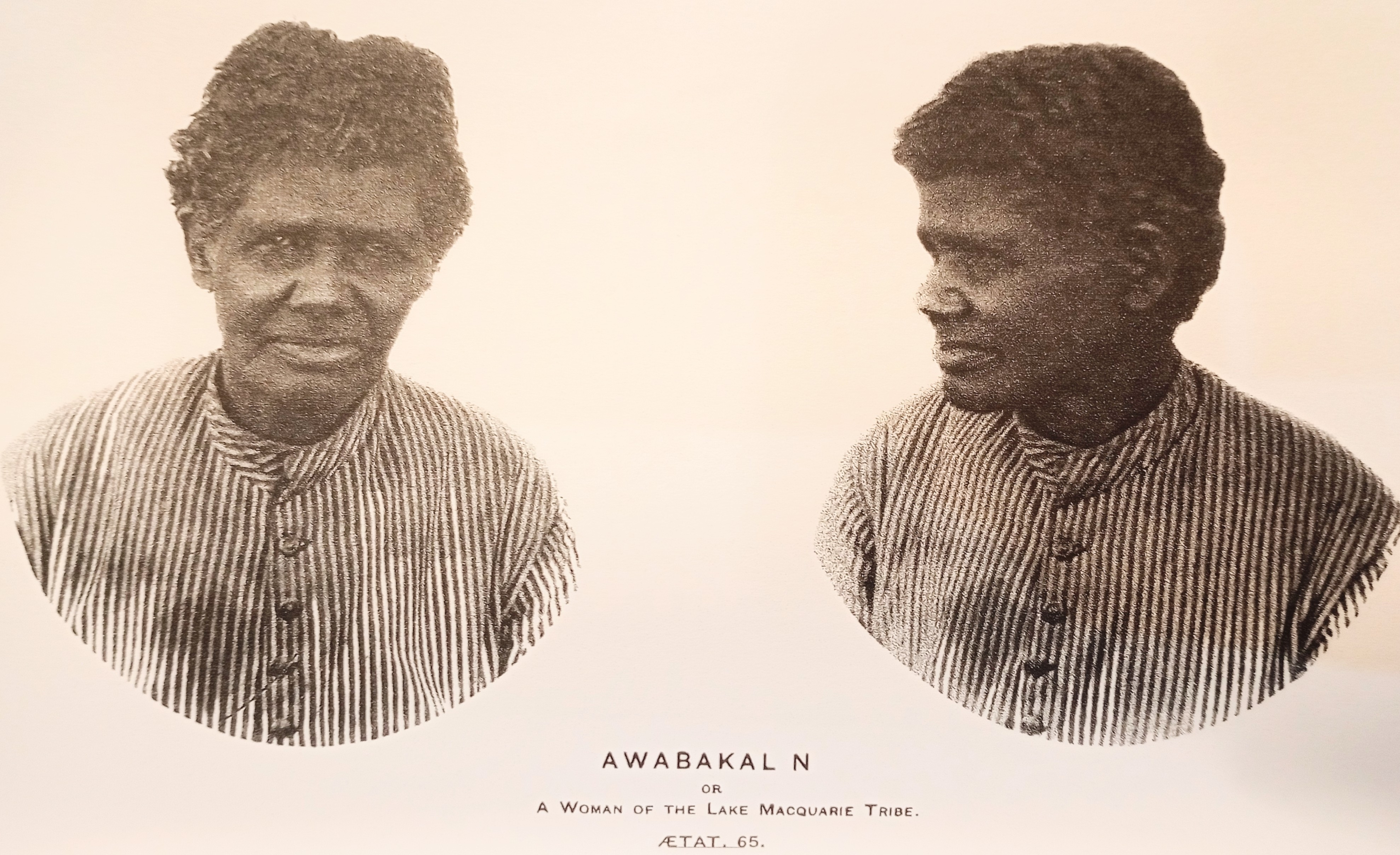
Margaret of the Awabakal

By the 1870s there was only one recognised group of Awabakal people of unmixed heritage continuing to live on country. This included a man named Black Ned, his wife Margaret and their two children William and Ellen. Attached to this family were three women, two of whom were named Kitty and Nullity. They lived at Swansea and were well respected members of the community. Black Ned died in 1877 while Margaret existed until 1894. Descendants of Ned and Margaret live on today. Black Ned's Bay and Margaret's Bay located near to Swansea were named in their honour.

== Awabakal in the modern day ==
The direct descendants of Margaret and Black Ned (or Mahrahkah) are represented by the Awabakal Descendants of the Traditional Owners Aboriginal Corporation.

Other Aboriginal residents in the Newcastle and Central Coast regions are supported by community organisations like 'The Awabakal Newcastle Aboriginal Cooperative Limited' which was established in 1976. It is responsible for the delivery of community and health services to Aboriginal people in this region, including:

- The Awabakal Medical Centre
- The Awabakal Disability Service
- Culturally appropriate care for older people
- Child care services

=== Butterfly Cave ===
The Butterfly Cave at West Wallsend is part of "women's business" site related to birthing, and had been the subject of decades of activism to ensure its protection. In 2013 it was recognised as a New South Wales 'Aboriginal Place' and in 2024 the State Government bought the land around the cave to protect it from housing developers.

=== Wollotuka Institute ===
Wollotuka, meaning an 'eating and meeting place' originally began as a support programme in 1983 to assist and promote university studies for Indigenous people. Wollotuka's all Indigenous staff moved into their new building, Birabahn in 2002, and the Wollotuka Institute was officially established on the grounds of the University of Newcastle in 2009.

The Awabakal Environmental Education Centre began operating in 1976. The centre provides opportunities for teachers and students in the Hunter Region to learn about the environment and human interactions with the natural world.

=== Native title ===
In 2013 an association of Awabakal and Guringai descendants laid claim to native title over land from Maitland to Hornsby. The claim was opposed by representatives of the Worimi and Wonnarua as asserting rights over their own traditional territories. In 2017 the claim was withdrawn after the NSW government declared that although the Descendants of the Traditional Owners Aboriginal Corporation had shown descent from the original people Indigenous to the area, they had failed to demonstrate continuous preservation of customary laws and practices since the onset of British colonisation.

== Notable Awabakal people ==
- Biraban – a recognised headman of the Awaba clan who assisted the Reverend Lancelot Threlkeld to compile the first grammatical study of an Aboriginal language in Australia
- Bob Barrett – a colonial enforcer who worked with the British to capture convicts at Newcastle and Port Macquarie
- Bungaree – leading Awabakal man and famous explorer who circumnavigated Australia firstly with Matthew Flinders and then later with Phillip Parker King
- Bo-un (Bowen) Bungaree – son of Bungaree and pioneering Aboriginal traveller to the USA
- Burigon – leading Awabakal man whose murder resulted in the first white man to be hanged in Australia for killing an Indigenous person
- Harry Brown – explorer who guided Ludwig Leichhardt on expeditions to northern Australia

== Alternative names ==
- Awaba (Awabakal toponym designating Lake Macquarie)
- Awabagal
- Kuri (generic term for "man")
- Kuringgai
- "Lake Macquarie, Newcastle" tribe
- Minyowa (Awabakal horde at Newcastle)
- Minyowie

Source: Tindale 1974, p. 191

== See also ==
- Arwarbukarl Cultural Resource Association
- Kuringgai
