= An Australian Grammar =

Book by Lancelot Edward Threlkeld

An Australian Grammar...
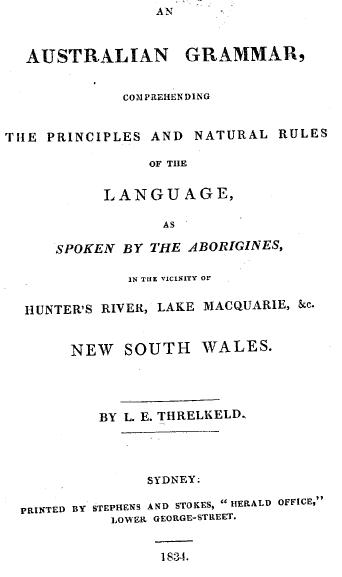
- Author: L. E. Threlkeld
- Language: English
- Subject: Awabakal language
- Genre: Grammar
- Publisher: Stephens and Stokes
- Publication date: 1834
- Publication place: Australia

An Australian grammar : comprehending the principles and natural rules of the language, as spoken by the Aborigines in the vicinity of Hunter's River, Lake Macquarie, &c. New South Wales is a book written by Lancelot Edward Threlkeld and published in Sydney in 1834. It is a grammar of the Awabakal language.

In 1892 a revised and much expanded version was published by ethnologist John Fraser, as An Australian Language as Spoken by the Awabakal..., in which he and other contributors added much text, several appendices, and a map of the tribes of New South Wales as frontispiece.

== Description ==
An Australian grammar : comprehending the principles and natural rules of the language, as spoken by the Aborigines in the vicinity of Hunter's River, Lake Macquarie, &c. New South Wales (1834), by English missionary Lancelot Threlkeld, is a description of what is now referred to as the Awabakal language, spoken by people in the Hunter Valley and Lake Macquarie regions of New South Wales, Australia.

== Revised and expanded version ==
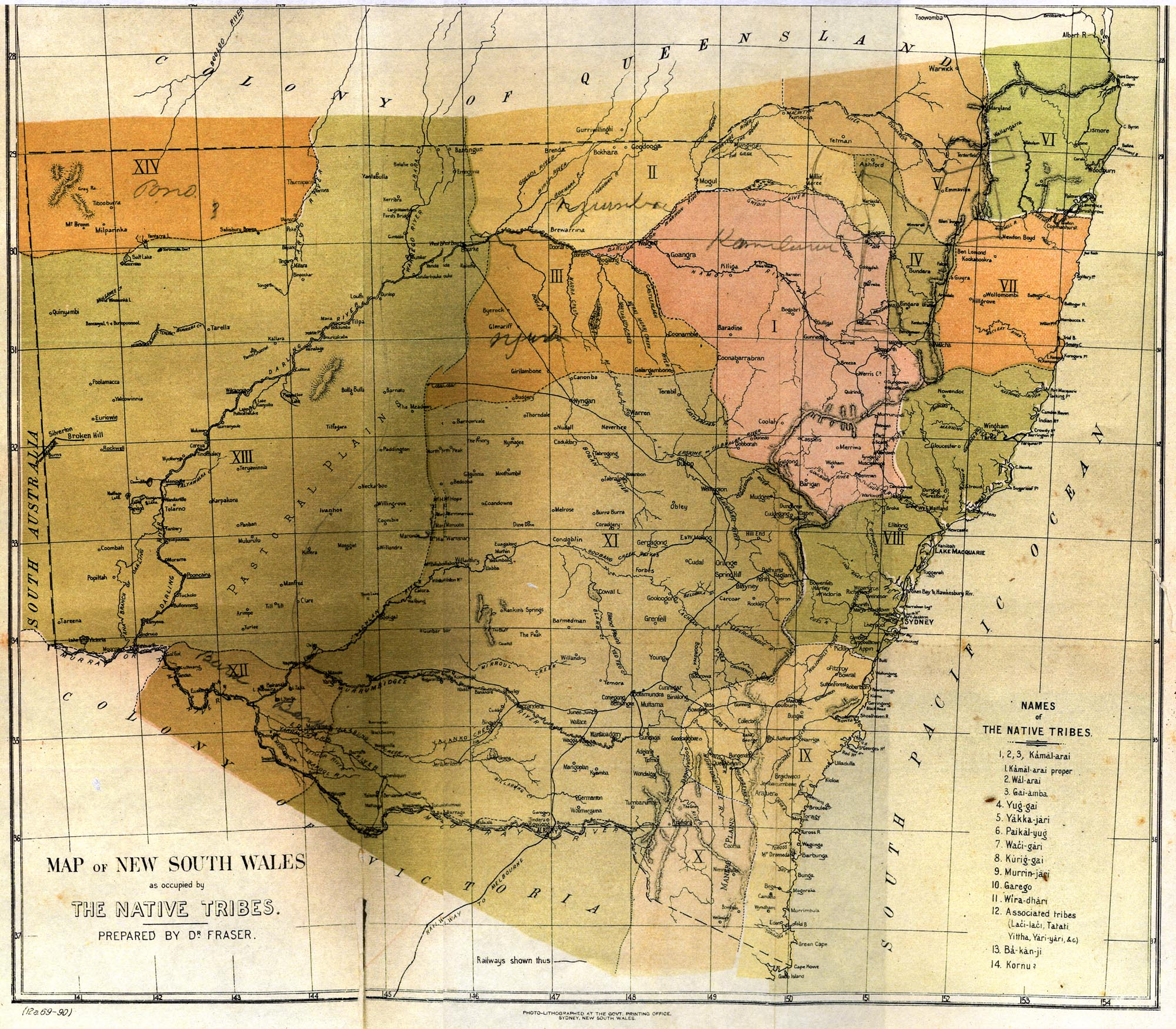
Fraser's map

In 1892, ethnologist and linguist John Fraser republished a greatly expanded version of Threlkeld's work, as An Australian language as spoken by the Awabakal, the people of Awaba or Lake Macquarie (near Newcastle, New South Wales) being an account of their language, traditions and customs / by L.E. Threlkeld; re-arranged, condensed and edited with an appendix by John Fraser.

In the preface, Fraser writes: "...but we have now come to know that this dialect was essentially the same as that spoken by the sub-tribes occupying the land where Sydney now stands, and that they all formed part of one great tribe, the Kuriggai". The book included a "Map of New South Wales as occupied by the native tribes", accompanied by descriptions and names decided upon by Fraser after "ten years' thought and inquiry on the location of our native tribes". The book was very influential, but not without its critics. Norman Tindale (1974) later wrote that there was such a "literary need for major groupings that [Fraser] set out to provide them for New South Wales, coining entirely artificial terms for his 'Great tribes'. These were not based on field research and lacked aboriginal support. His names such as Yunggai, Wachigari and Yakkajari can be ignored as artifacts".

== Comparison of contents ==
=== 1834 edition ===
The contents of Threlkeld's work are as follows:

- Introductory remarks
- Part 1: Pronunciation and Orthography (three chapters: Pronunciation; Orthography; Etymology)
- Part 2: The parts of speech
- Part 3: Vocabulary and illustrations (two chapters: Vocabulary; Illustrations)

=== 1892 edition ===
The contents of Fraser's edition are as follows:

- Frontispiece: Map of New South Wales as occupied by the native tribes
- The illustrations [Text explaining map, and three other illustrations, pictures of people]
- Introduction
- Part 1.
  - An Australian grammar : comprehending the principles and natural rules of the language, as spoken by the aborigines, in the vicinity of Hunter's River, Lake Macquarie, &c. New South Wales / L.E. Threlkeld [1834]
  - A key to the structure of the aboriginal language : being an analysis of the particles used as affixes, to form the various modifications of the verbs; shewing the essential powers, abstract roots, and other peculiarities of the language spoken by the aborigines in the vicinity of Hunter River, lake Macquarie, etc., New South wales / L.E. Threlkeld [1850]
- Part 2. The gospel by St. Luke translated into the language of the Awabakal / L.E. Threlkeld [1891]
- Part 3. An Awabakal-English lexicon to the gospel according to Saint Luke / L.E. Threlkeld [1892]
- Part 4.
  - Appendix A. A short grammar and vocabulary of the dialect spoken by the Minyung people of the north-east coast of New South Wales / H. Livingstone
  - B. Grammar of the language spoken by the Narrinyeri tribe in S. Australia / G. Taplin
  - C. Grammar of the language spoken by the aborigines of Western Australia
  - D. Grammar and vocabulary of the aboriginal dialect called the Wirradhuri
  - E. Prayers in the Awabakal dialect
  - F. Gurre Kamilaroi 'Kamilaroi sayings'
  - G. Specimens of a dialect of the aborigines of New South Wales : being the first attempt to form their speech into a written language.
