= Awabakal language =

Australian Aboriginal language

Awabakal
- Hunter River – Lake Macquarie
- An Australian Aboriginal language, as spoken by the Awabakal
- Native to: Eastern New South Wales, Australia
- Region: Lake Macquarie, Newcastle
- Ethnicity: Awabakal, Geawegal, Wonnarua
- Extinct: late 19th century
- Revival: early stages of revival
- Language family: Pama–Nyungan: Yuin–Kuric; Kuri; Worimi; Awabakal
- Dialects: Awabagal; Geawegal; Wonarua

Language codes
- ISO 639-3: awk
- Glottolog: awab1243
- AIATSIS: S66
- ELP: Awabakal

Awabakal (also Awabagal or the Hunter River – Lake Macquarie, often abbreviated HRLM language) is an Australian Aboriginal language that was spoken around Lake Macquarie and Newcastle in New South Wales. The name is derived from Awaba, which was the native name of the lake. It was spoken by Awabakal and Wonnarua peoples.

It was studied by missionary Lancelot Threlkeld in the 19th century, who wrote a grammar of the language, but the spoken language had died out before 21st-century revival efforts.

== Classification ==
Awabakal is a Pama–Nyungan language, most closely related to the Worimi language, within the Yuin–Kuric group of Pama–Nyungan.

== History ==
Awabakal was studied by the Reverend Lancelot Threlkeld from 1825 until his death in 1859, producing a grammar and dictionary in An Australian Grammar in 1834. The speaker of Awabakal who taught him about the language was Biraban, the tribal leader. Threlkeld and Biraban's Specimens of a Dialect of the Aborigines of New South Wales in 1827 was the earliest attempt at exhibiting the structure of an Australian language.

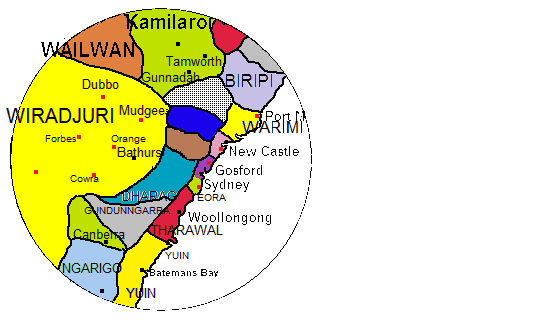
Traditional lands of Australian Aboriginal tribes of eastern New South Wales

Threlkeld's work was greatly expanded by John Fraser and republished in 1892 as An Australian language as spoken by the Awabakal, the people of Awaba or Lake Macquarie (near Newcastle, New South Wales) being an account of their language, traditions and customs / by L.E. Threlkeld; re-arranged, condensed and edited with an appendix by John Fraser. It contained a grammar and vocabulary as well as much new material by Fraser, and helped to popularise the name "Awabakal" for the language grouping more broadly referred to as the Hunter River-Lake Macquarie language.

== Revival ==
The language is currently being revived. A new orthography and reconstruction of the phonology has been undertaken. To date, several publications have been produced including "A grammar for the Awabakal language", "An introduction to the Awabakal language : its orthography, recommended orthoepy and its grammar and stylistics " and "Nupaleyalaan palii Awabakalkoba = Teach yourself Awabakal".

== Phonology ==
=== Consonants ===
	Labial	Alveolar	Palatal	Velar
Plosive	p	t	c	k
Nasal	m	n	ɲ	ŋ
Trill		r		
Lateral		l		
Approximant	w	ɹ	j	

- Stop sounds /p, t, c, k/ may also be heard as voiced [b, d, ɟ, ɡ] in free variation among speakers.
- Palatal sounds /c/, /ɲ/ may also have dental allophones as [t̪, d̪], [n̪].

=== Vowels ===
	Front	Central	Back
Close	i		u
Open		a	

- Vowel length may or may not be distinctive.

== Grammar ==
=== Nouns ===
There exist three noun classes. The first has 4 declension patterns. A noun can exist in any of 13 cases.

- 1st class – Common nouns, descriptors, demonstratives and minaring 'what?'
- 2nd class – Place names, words of spatial relations and wonta 'where?'
- 3rd class – Personal names, kinship terms, and ngaan 'who?'

The default, unmarked case of nouns is the absolutive. Unlike English and many European languages, in which an unmarked noun is the nominative case, and is (in the active voice) the subject of the sentence, Awabakal merely references a particular noun with this case.

=== Descriptors ===
There is a category of words in Awabakal called descriptors. They can stand as referring terms and are in these cases similar to nouns, like adjectives or intransitive verbs/predicative verb-adjective phrases. They can be declined into nominal cases.

=== Numbers ===
There are four number words.

- wakool 'one'
- bulowara 'two'
- ngoro 'three'
- wara 'four, five' (also 'palm of the hand', a metaphorical extension of 'a handful of')

=== Pronominal enclitics ===
Pronominal enclitics are suffixes which have several functions and can be attached to verbs, descriptors, appositions, interrogatives, negatives and nouns. The numbers are: singular, dual and plural with a feminine/masculine distinction in the first person. They mark verbs for person, number, case and voice. The "ergative" enclitcs imply an active transitive situation and the "accusative" implies a passive intransitive situation. There are three true pronouns which could be called a nominative or topic case. There are only found at the beginning of an independent clause. These pronominals are found in ergative, accusative, dative and possessive cases.

=== Demonstratives ===
There are 3 degrees. They are declined for 10 cases.

- 'this' near the speaker
- 'that' near the addressee(s)
- 'that' there (but at hand)

=== Appositive demonstratives ===
Here too, there are 3 degrees. These terms indicate place. They decline for 13 cases.

=== Verbs ===
The default verbative voice of Awabakal verbs is neutral, i.e., they do not give a sense of active or passive. The pronominal enclitics indicate which voice the verb should be analysed as being in. There are 3 present tenses, 8 future and 7 past, with various voice, aspect and mood modifications.

kariwang+ku minaring ta+taan?
magpie+ERG what(ABS) eat+PRES
'What does the magpie eat?'

minaring+ku kariwang ta+taan
what+ERG magpie(ABS) eat+PRES
'What eats the magpie?'

=== Negatives ===
There are 10 forms of negatives which work with different types of words or phrases.

=== Conjunctions ===
Conjunctions are not commonly used in comparison to many languages. Sentences can often be connected without their use. These also have various combinations and case declinations.

=== Interrogatives ===
- ngaan 'who?'
- minaring 'what?'
- wonta 'where?'
- yakowai 'how?'
- yakowanta 'when?'
- iorakowa 'why not?'
- wiya 'say (how about) ...'

== Sample texts ==
Wonto ba kauwȧllo mankulla unnoa tara túġunbilliko ġurránto ġéen kinba,
2. Yanti bo ġearun kin bara ġukulla, unnoa tara nakillikan kurri-kurri kabiruġ ġatun mankillikan wiyellikanne koba.
3. Murrȧrȧġ tia kȧtan yantibo, koito baġ ba tuiġ ko ġirouġ Teopolo murrȧrȧġ ta,
4. Gurra-uwil koa bi tuloa, unnoa tara wiyatoara banuġ ba.

—Introduction of the Gospel of Luke

=== The Lord's Prayer ===
Below is the Lord's Prayer in Awabakal, according to the Gospel of Luke. Part of the Gospel of Luke was translated into Awabakal in 1892 and below the text reflects the orthography of the prayer in 1892.

Ġatun noa wiya barun, wiyånůn ba,
ġiakai wiyånůn nura,
Biyuġbai ġearúmba wokka ka ba moroko ka ba kåtan, Kåmůnbilla yitirra ġiroúmba.
Ġurrabunbilla wiyellikanne ġiroúmba,
yanti moroko ka ba, yanti ta purrai ta ba.
Ġuwoa ġearún purreåġ ka takilliko.
Ġatun warekilla ġearúnba yarakai umatoara,
kulla ġéen yanti ta wareka yanti ta wiyapaiyeůn ġearúnba.
Ġatun yuti yikpra ġearún yarakai umullikan kolaġ;
mitomulla ġearún yarakai tabiruġ.

== Influence on English ==
The word Koori, a self-referential term used by some Aboriginal people, comes from Awabakal.

== Bibliography ==
=== 19th century ===
- Threlkeld, Lancelot Edward (1827). Specimens of a Dialect of the Aborigines of New South Wales; Being the first attempt to form their speech into a written language. Sydney: printed at the 'Monitor Office,' by Arthur Hill.
- Threlkeld, Lancelot Edward (1834). An Australian grammar: comprehending the principles and natural rules of the language, as spoken by the Aborigines in the vicinity of Hunter's River, Lake Macquarie, &c. New South Wales. Printed by Stephens and Stokes. hdl:2440/61558.
- Threlkeld, Lancelot Edward (1836). An Australian spelling book in the language as spoken by the Aborigines in the vicinity of Hunter's River, Lake Macquarie, New South Wales. Sydney: Stephens and Stokes, 'Herald Office'.
- Threlkeld, Lancelot Edward (1850). A key to the structure of the Aboriginal language; being an analysis of the particles used as affixes, to form the various modifications of the verbs; shewing the essential powers, abstract roots, and other peculiarities of the language spoken by the Aborigines in the vicinity of Hunter River, Lake Macquarie, etc., New South Wales: together with comparisons of Polynesian and other dialects. Sydney: Kemp and Fairfax.
- Threlkeld, Lancelot Edward (1858). "Language of the Australian Aborigines". Waugh's Australian Almanac for the Year 1858. pp. 60–80.
- Threlkeld, Lancelot Edward (1892). Fraser, John (ed.). An Australian language as spoken by the Awabakal, the people of Awaba or Lake Macquarie (near Newcastle, New South Wales): being an account of their language, traditions and customs. Charles Potter, Govt. Printer. (NLA catalogue entry)

=== 21st century ===
- Arposio, Alex (2009) [First published early 2008. Revised edition published November 2008. Reprinted August 2009]. A grammar for the Awabakal language (Rev. ed.). Arwarbukarl Cultural Resource Association.
- Arwarbukarl Cultural Resource Association (2010). Awabakal dictionary (Research ed.). Arwarbukarl Cultural Resource Association. ISBN 978-0-9804680-8-3.

== See also ==
- Arwarbukarl Cultural Resource Association
- Indigenous Australian languages
- List of Aboriginal languages of New South Wales
