= Lancelot Threlkeld =

English missionary (1788–1859)

Lancelot Edward Threlkeld
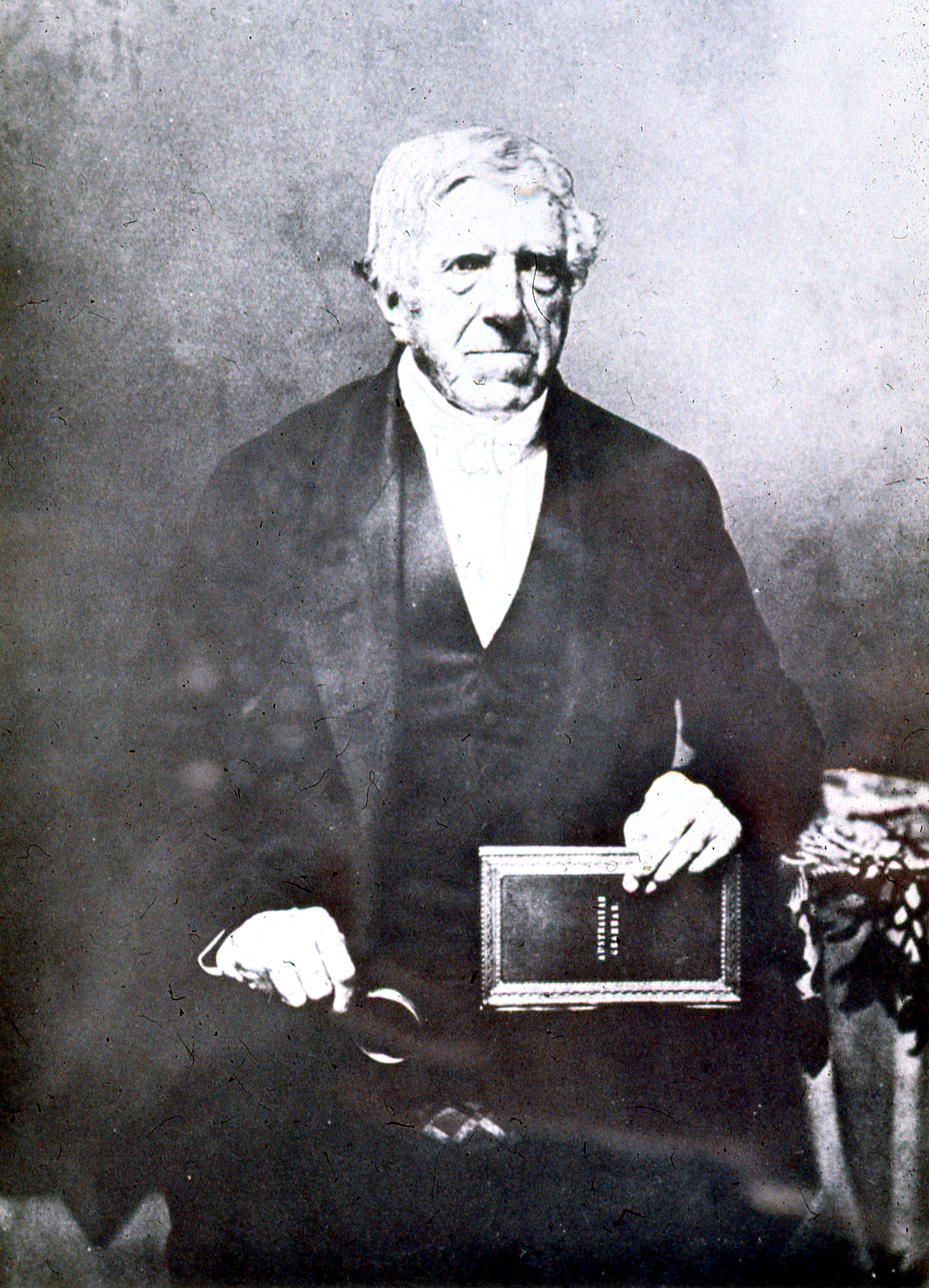

Personal life
- Born: 20 October 1788
- Died: 10 October 1859 (aged 70)
- Spouse: Martha Gross (married 1808–1824); Sarah Arndell (married 1824–1853)
- Children: Joseph Thomas Threlkeld; Martha Threlkeld; Tabitha Threlkeld; Mary Williams; Elizabeth Sophia Threlkeld; Lancelot Edward Threlkeld; Sarah Ann Threlkeld; Thomas Samuel Threlkeld

Religious life
- Religion: Christianity
- Ordination: 8 November 1815

Lancelot Edward Threlkeld (20 October 1788 – 10 October 1859) was an English missionary, primarily based in Australia. He was married twice and survived by sons and daughters from both marriages. Threlkeld is known for his work with Biraban in recording and publishing English translations of the Awabakal language.

== Early life ==
Born in Southwark, England, now in south London, on 20 October 1788, Threlkeld was son of Samuel Joseph Threlkeld, a brush-maker, and his wife Mary. In 1813 he began training as an evangelical missionary with the London Missionary Society (LMS). His missionary career began in 1814, with an assignment to the Society Islands.

== Missionary life ==
=== Evangelist ===
Threlkeld was well educated, and on 8 November 1815 sailed for Tahiti, but the illness and subsequent death of a child of his detained him for a year in Rio de Janeiro. He reached Eimeo (now Mo'orea in French Polynesia) in November.

Here Daniel Tyerman and George Bennet, travelling LMS deputies, appointed Threlkeld as missionary to the Aboriginal people of Lake Macquarie. Situated on land allocated by Governor Brisbane, Threlkeld was instructed to teach Aboriginal people agriculture, carpentry and establish a children's school. The LMS also dictated Threlkeld learn the local language as a precursor to successful Christian conversions.

By September 1826 Threlkeld and family were living on site at the Bahtahbah mission in six-roomed house. Alongside the Threlkeld family were three British overseers, one an assigned convict, one an adult and one a child domestic. Threlkeld, who was paying Aboriginal workers on site with fishing hooks, food and clothing, wrote in 1825, "[It] is my intention to act here upon the same plan we found so successful at Raiatea namely, give nothing to any individual but in return for some labour for common good!" Threlkeld wrote of the early period of the mission's settlement. Aboriginal people frequenting the mission sought land allocations: "Two natives have spoken to me already to allow them a portion of land for agriculture."

Residing on site at Bahtahbah mission enabled Threlkeld to work closely and frequently with Awabakal Elder Biraban. One significant task they undertook together was to establish a written form for the Awabakal language. Threlkeld wrote of this period as one being filled with mornings in which he worked with Biraban, "who speaks very good English, in writing the language.... Our conversations vary, and cruise from enquiries into their customs and habits. Easy sentences, passages from scripture, and information on Christian subjects are attempted." As a consequence of such work, Threlkeld published Specimens of a Dialect of the Aborigines of New South Wales.

Despite this socio-linguistic success in 1827, the lack of religious conversions led to the LMS objecting to Threlkeld's expenses. This assertion also affected Threlkeld's conflict with the colonial magistrate, Rev. Samuel Marsden, and Presbyterian minister, Rev. John Dunmore Lang. The LMS consequently appointed Marsden as a financial overseer and thus manager of the Bahtahbah mission. In 1828 the LMS, dissatisfied with Threkeld's evangelical work, directed him to abandon the Bahtahbah mission, and offered to pay for his return to London. Declining the LMS invitation, Threlkeld was subsequently appointed by Governor Darling, on behalf of the colonial government, to continue his "Christianisation and civilisation." This mission was allocated between 1,000 and 1,280 acres (400 and 520 ha) on the northern side of Lake Macquarie, and were named as Derabambah, Punte and Puneir by Aboriginal populations and Ebenezer (mission) by the European population. Initially, a mission house with 12 rooms was built of weatherboard and plaster. Later the site also hosted a storehouse, a barn, a hut (as living quarters for Australian/European men living on site), orchards and fenced cattle spaces. However, with less financial support and goods to distribute Threlkeld's ability to persuade Awabakal people to remain on site dramatically decreased. The official closure of the Ebenezer Mission occurred on 31 December 1841, with the precarious financial position of Threlkeld leading to the establishment of grazing stock and mining of coal seams on the property. In 1842 the British Secretary of State for the Colonies qualified the evangelical missions, such as Threlkeld's, as failures. However, the LMS, having received a letter from the Quakers James Backhouse and George Washington Walker, detailing the specific nature of missionary work in the Australian colonies, acknowledged Threlkeld's "vigilance, activity and devotedness to the welfare of the Aboriginal race."

== Interpreter ==
=== The Awabakal Scriptures ===
Threlkeld worked in association with Biraban to translate, conceptualise and write various Christian religious texts. Threlkeld published a book describing the Awabakal language: An Australian Grammar, comprehending the Principles and Natural Rules of the Language, as spoken by the Aborigines, in the vicinity of Hunter's river, Lake Macquarie, New South Wales. In 1836, he published An Australian Spelling Book in the Language spoken by the Aborigines. Threlkeld described the translation process with Biraban as follows: "Thrice I wrote [the Gospel of Luke], and he and I went through it sentence by sentence as we proceeded. McGill spoke the English language fluently." The objective of Threlkeld was to create a linguistic record "before the speakers themselves become totally extinct," as a means of "scientific inquiry" and "ethnographical pursuits". Threlkeld began translating the New Testament into the Hunter's River Aboriginal language, but realising in 1842 that his mission was achieving little success, Threlkeld ceased his linguistic work. Threlkeld later resumed working on publications of the Awabakal language, publishing A Key to the Structure of the Aboriginal Language (1850) and was working on a translation of the four Gospels at the time of his sudden death on 10 October 1859.

=== The Supreme Court ===
Threlkeld's linguistic work was highly valued in the Colonial Courts in the 1830s, as "Aborigines were not permitted to give evidence in court, not being allowed to swear an oath on the Bible without adhering to Christianity." Threlkeld also provided ethnographic information used to inform judges' conclusions in numerous cases.

== Protector ==
Threlkeld used the mission's Annual Reports and formal inquiries, such as Committee on the Aborigines Question, as forces to attempt to ameliorate Aboriginal dispossession and violent subjection.

In 1840 Threlkeld, writing to the Colonial Secretary, highlighted the paradoxical nature of the colonial courts: I am now perfectly at a loss to describe to [the Aborigines] their position. Christian laws will hang the aborigines [for] violence done to Christians, but Christian laws will not protect them from the aggressions of nominal Christians, because aborigines must give evidence only upon oath.

After the closure of the Ebenezer mission, Threlkeld served on Aboriginal welfare boards, attended police courts in support of Aboriginal defendants, and joined the Ethnological Society of London. In 1853 Threlkeld argued that the low status attributed to Aboriginal people was a "convenient assumption", as such characterisation at the level of "species of wild beasts, [meant] there could be no guilt attributed to those [settlers] who shot them off or poisoned them."

== Contemporary relevance ==
In 1892, ethnographer John Fraser republished Threlkeld's work on the Awabakal language in his An Australian Grammar (1834), "re-arranged, condensed and edited with an appendix by" Fraser. Norman Tindale (1974) wrote that there was such a "literary need for major groupings that [Fraser] set out to provide them for New South Wales, coining entirely artificial terms for his 'Great tribes'. These were not based on field research and lacked aboriginal support". Some of these terms had entered into the literature, despite their dubious origins, according to Tindale, including Bangarang (Vic.); Booandik (Vic. & SA); Barkunjee (Barkindji) (NSW), Kurnai (Vic.), Thurrawal (Dharawal) (NSW), Wiradjuri (NSW) and Malegoondeet (?) (Vic.).

From the late 1970s, Threlkeld's accounts were utilised in the regions of the Hunter Valley and Watagan Mountains in Land Rights claims and the determination of Aboriginal sites of significance.

In 1986 Threlkeld's work became the basis for an Awabakal language revitalisation project.

=== Australia's History Wars ===
Threlkeld's Annual Reports, which contained information concerning Aboriginal massacres, such as the Waterloo Creek massacre, remain crucial points of contention within Australia's History Wars. Keith Windschuttle argues that Threlkeld inflated numbers of the dead to gain support for his mission proposals. John Harris, on the other hand, argues, "We have few enough sources of Aboriginal eyewitness accounts as it is and those we do have, we owe to the concern and courage of missionaries like Lancelot Threlkeld." Macintyre explains the intersection of these viewpoints within Australia's media. The National Museum of Australia has labelled Threlkeld's era as "the most fiercely contested aspect of the national story."

== Publications ==
- Aboriginal Mission, New South Wales (1825)
- Specimens of a Dialect, of the Aborigines of New South Wales; being the First Attempt to Form their Speech into a Written Language (1827)
- Morning Prayers in the Awabakal Dialect (1835) digitized by Richard Mammana
- A Statement chiefly relating to The Formation and Abandonment of a Mission to the Aborigines (1928)
- An Australian Grammar, Comprehending the Principles and Natural Rules of the Language, as Spoken by the Aborigines, in the Vicinity of Hunter's River, Lake Macquarie, &c. New South Wales (1834)
- An Australian Spelling Book, in the Language as Spoken by the Aborigines, in the Vicinity of Hunter's River, Lake Macquarie, New South Wales (1836)
- A Key to the Structure of the Aboriginal Language (1850)
