= County of Bogong =

Coordinates: 36°15′S 146°50′E

Bogong
- Cadastral division
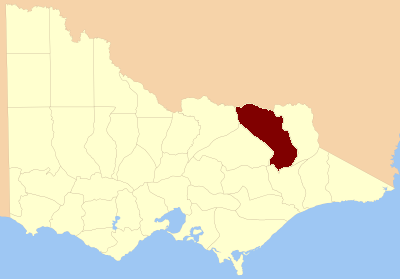
- Location in Victoria
- Country: Australia
- State: Victoria
- Established: 24 February 1871

Area
  - Total: 7,949 km^{2} (3,069 sq mi)
Lands administrative divisions around Bogong
Denison (NSW)	Hume (NSW)	Benambra
Delatite	Bogong	Benambra
Wonnangatta	Dargo	Dargo

The County of Bogong is one of the 37 counties of Victoria which are part of the cadastral divisions of Australia, used for land titles. It is located south of the Murray River, east of the Ovens River, and west of the Mitta Mitta River. Mount Bogong is located there, the highest mountain in Victoria. The county was proclaimed in 1871.

== Origin of the name ==
Bogong moth is a native insect of Australia. This was once considered a delicacy by the aborigines who collected the dormant larvae and cooked them. A town, Bogong, in the state of Victoria has been named after the moth.

== Parishes ==
Parishes within the county:

- Barambogie, Victoria
- Baranduda, Victoria
- Barnawartha North, Victoria
- Barnawartha South, Victoria
- Barwidgee, Victoria
- Beechworth, Victoria
- Beethang, Victoria
- Belvoir West, Victoria
- Bingo-Munjie, Victoria
- Bingo-Munjie North, Victoria
- Bingo-Munjie South, Victoria
- Bogong North, Victoria
- Bogong South, Victoria
- Bolga, Victoria
- Bonegilla, Victoria
- Bontherambo, Victoria
- Boorgunyah, Victoria
- Boorhaman, Victoria
- Bright, Victoria
- Brimin, Victoria
- Bruarong, Victoria
- Bundara-Munjie, Victoria
- Byawatha, Victoria
- Carlyle, Victoria
- Carraragarmungee, Victoria
- Carruno, Victoria
- Chiltern, Victoria
- Chiltern West, Victoria
- Darbalang, Victoria
- Dederang, Victoria
- Dorchap, Victoria
- El Dorado, Victoria
- Estcourt, Victoria
- Everton, Victoria
- Freeburgh, Victoria
- Gooramadda, Victoria
- Gundowring, Victoria
- Harrietville, Victoria
- Hotham, Victoria
- Kergunyah, Victoria
- Kergunyah North, Victoria
- Lilliput, Victoria
- Lochiel, Victoria
- Ludrik-Munjie, Victoria
- Magorra, Victoria
- Mudgeegonga, Victoria
- Mullagong, Victoria
- Mullindolingong, Victoria
- Murmungee, Victoria
- Murramurrangbong, Victoria
- Myrtleford, Victoria
- Noorongong, Victoria
- Norong, Victoria
- Nowyeo, Victoria
- Omeo, Victoria
- Porepunkah, Victoria
- Stanley, Victoria
- Tallandoon, Victoria
- Tangambalanga, Victoria
- Tarrawingee, Victoria
- Tawanga, Victoria
- Theddora, Victoria
- Tongaro, Victoria
- Undowah, Victoria
- Wallaby, Victoria
- Wangaratta North, Victoria
- Wermatong, Victoria
- Wodonga, Victoria
- Wollonaby, Victoria
- Woorragee, Victoria
- Woorragee North, Victoria
- Yackandandah, Victoria

== See also ==
- Counties of Victoria
