= List of places on the Victorian Heritage Register in the Shire of Indigo =

This is a list of places on the Victorian Heritage Register in the Shire of Indigo in Victoria, Australia. The Victorian Heritage Register is maintained by the Heritage Council of Victoria.

The Victorian Heritage Register, as of 2026, lists the following four state-registered places within the Shire of Indigo:

Place name	Place #	Location	Suburb or Town	Co-ordinates	Built	State registered	Photo
All Saints Winery	VHR H0333	315 All Saints Road	Wahgunyah	35.994320°S 146.410570°E	1870	9 October 1974	
Baarmutha Hydraulic Sluicing Area	VHR H2466	Buckland Gap Road	Beechworth	36.400032°S 146.692322°E	1852	21 August 2025	
Beechworth Cemetery	VHR H2215	Cemetery Road	Beechworth	36.344720°S 146.691520°E	1854	8 October 2009	
Beechworth Justice Precinct	VHR H1464	Ford Street	Beechworth	36.358920°S 146.688430°E	1857	20 August 1982	
Beechworth Post Office	VHR H0867	28A Camp Street	Beechworth	36.359480°S 146.687460°E	1870	27 March 1991	
Beechworth Primary School No. 1560	VHR H1718	Junction Road	Beechworth	36.355130°S 146.693160°E	1874	20 August 1982	
Bellevue	VHR H0355	9 William Street	Beechworth	36.356240°S 146.686280°E	1861	9 October 1974	
Black Springs Bakery	VHR H2038	464 Beechworth-Wangaratta Road	Beechworth	36.371530°S 146.643530°E	1875	13 November 2003	
Bridge	VHR H1428	Commissioners Creek, Isaacs Avenue	Yackandandah	36.312600°S 146.841940°E	1857	20 August 1982	
Burke Museum	VHR H0345	28 Loch Street	Beechworth	36.358126°S 146.687340°E	1857	9 October 1974	
Chiltern Athenaeum and Museum	VHR H0351	57 Conness Street	Chiltern	36.151090°S 146.609820°E	1866	June 19, 1997	
Chiltern Railway Station and Goods Shed	VHR H1603	Railway Access Road	Chiltern	36.155800°S 146.611350°E	1875	August 20, 1982	
Christ Church	VHR H0346	25-27 Ford Street	Beechworth	36.360830°S 146.684390°E	1855	9 October 1974	
Dow’s Pharmacy and Collection	VHR H2474	42-44 Conness Street	Chiltern	36.151480°S 146.608510°E	1868	15 October 2026	
Fairfield	VHR H0700	3210 Murray Valley Highway	Rutherglen	36.037560°S 146.576320°E	1889	21 September 1988	
Former Bank of Australasia	VHR H0277	28 Conness Street	Chiltern	36.151490°S 146.607620°E	1877	9 October 1974	
Former Bank of NSW	VHR H0349	87 Ford Street	Beechworth	36.359100°S 146.686970°E	1856	9 October 1974	
Former Bank of Victoria	VHR H0348	29 Camp Street	Beechworth	36.359790°S 146.687090°E	1857	9 October 1974	
Former Beechworth Gaol	VHR H1549	Reformatory Reserve, Williams Street	Beechworth	36.357390°S 146.690480°E	1859	20 August 1982	
Former Customs House	VHR H0332	2 Foord Street	Wahgunyah	36.007940°S 146.394970°E	1886	9 October 1974	
Former Methodist Church	VHR H0523	26-30 Ford Street	Beechworth	36.361430°S 146.685130°E	1854	7 May 1982	
Former Ovens Benevolent Asylum	VHR H1510	3A and 5 Warner Road, 42 Gilchrist Avenue, 6 Boiler House Lane, and 26-28 Albert Road	Beechworth	36.366380°S 146.692640°E	1862	20 August 1982	
Former Ovens District Hospital	VHR H0358	13 Church Street	Beechworth	36.358810°S 146.682380°E	1862	9 October 1974	
Gundowring Homestead	VHR H0367	1350 Gundowring Road	Gundowring	36.375190°S 147.059720°E	1860	9 October 1974	
Kirby Flat Gold Mining Diversion Sluice	VHR H1256	Bells Flat Road	Yackandandah	36.335850°S 146.824760°E	1851	19 December 1996	
Lakeview	VHR H0280	18-22 Victoria Street	Chiltern	36.154700°S 146.610180°E	1870	9 October 1974	
London Tavern	VHR H0350	43 Camp Street	Beechworth	36.358230°S 146.685070°E	1859	9 October 1974	
Magenta Quartz Mine	VHR H1873	145 Magenta Road	Chiltern	36.135150°S 146.625500°E	1860	20 August 1982	
Magpie Creek Gold Mining Diversion Sluice	VHR H1253	Kibell Lane	Wooragee	36.311650°S 146.735290°E	1860	19 December 1996	
Mayday Hills Hospital	VHR H1189	Albert Road	Beechworth	36.368599°S 146.696091°E	1864	20 August 1982	
Mount Ophir Winery	VHR H0334	168 Stillards Lane	Rutherglen	36.083380°S 146.516610°E	1891	9 October 1974	
Newtown Bridge Precinct	VHR H1424	Spring Creek, Bridge Road	Beechworth	36.365420°S 146.683760°E	1875	20 August 1982	
Olive Hills	VHR H0698	3221 Murray Valley Highway	Rutherglen	36.044870°S 146.575240°E	1886	21 September 1988	
Powder Magazine	VHR H0357	Skidmore Road	Beechworth	36.355230°S 146.679080°E	1858	9 October 1974	
Queen Victoria Park	VHR H2262	Beechworth-Wangaratta Road	Beechworth	36.355816°S 146.691817°E	1874	9 December 2010	
Residence - 26 Finch Street	VHR H0352	26 Finch Street	Beechworth	36.357230°S 146.686380°E	1860	9 October 1974	
Residence - 39 Finch Street	VHR H0353	39 Finch Street	Beechworth	36.356380°S 146.686430°E	1862	9 October 1974	
Residence - 10 John Street	VHR H0354	10 John Street	Beechworth	36.365730°S 146.685150°E	1862	9 October 1974	
Rutherglen Research Institute	VHR H1650	124 Chiltern Valley Road	Rutherglen	36.095740°S 146.505930°E	1896	12 October 1988	
S. G. Dean's Grocery & Hardware Store	VHR H0368	26-28 High Street	Yackandandah	36.313680°S 146.838760°E	1864	9 October 1974	
St Andrews Uniting Church	VHR H0347	115 Ford Street	Beechworth	36.357400°S 146.688670°E	1857	9 October 1974	
Star Theatre	VHR H0278	38 Main Street	Chiltern	36.150750°S 146.609790°E	1859	9 October 1974	
Tanswell's Commercial Hotel	VHR H0351	30 Ford Street	Beechworth	36.360530°S 146.686300°E	1853	9 October 1974	
The Hermitage	VHR H0279	2132 Murray Valley Highway	Barnawartha	36.051940°S 146.696240°E	1852	9 October 1974	
Wallaby Mine Gold Battery Site	VHR H1272	Wallaby Mine Track	Stanley	36.361020°S 146.761620°E	1851	19 December 1996	
Wallaces Lead Gold Puddling Precinct	VHR H1746	Mount Pleasant Road	Cornishtown	36.110350°S 146.596800°E	1854	17 September 1998	
Yackandandah Court House	VHR H1490	4A William Street	Yackandandah	36.311340°S 146.841400°E	1864	20 August 1982	
Yackandandah Creek Gold Hydraulic Sluicing Works	VHR H1755	Yackandandah Track and Cohns Track	Yackandandah	36.338550°N 146.815160°E	1940	26 November 1998	
Yackandandah Creek Gorge Gold Mining Diversion Sluice	VHR H1254	Bells Flat Road	Yackandandah	36.321660°S 146.831460°E	1882	19 December 1996	
Yackandandah Creek Hydraulic Gold Sluicing Pit	VHR H1227	Number One Road	Yackandandah	36.351130°S 146.801800°E	1851	28 November 1996	
