= Kiewa Valley Highway =

Highway in Victoria, Australia

Kiewa Valley Highway Victoria
- Coordinates: 36.147716°S 146.928174°E (North end); 36.743159°S 147.168212°E (South end)

General information
- Type: Highway
- Length: 79.2 km (49 mi)
- Gazetted: November 1914 (as Main Road); 1959/60 (as State Highway)
- Route number(s): C531 (1998–present)
- Former route number: State Route 191 (1986–1998)

Major junctions
- North end: Murray Valley Highway; Bandiana, Victoria
- Kiewa East Road; Running Creek Road
- South end: Bogong High Plains Road; Mount Beauty, Victoria

Location(s)
- Region: Hume
- Major settlements: Dederang, Tawonga

Highway system
- Highways in Australia; National Highway • Freeways in Australia; Highways in Victoria

Kiewa Valley Highway is a rural highway which traverses the Kiewa Valley near the alpine regions of Victoria, Australia, connecting the eastern Wodonga suburb of Bandiana to Mount Beauty, at the foot of Mount Bogong in the Alpine National Park.

== Route ==
Kiewa Valley Highway commences at the intersection with Murray Valley Highway in Bandiana and heads in a south-easterly direction as a two-lane, single carriageway rural highway, mostly following the course of Kiewa River through Kiewa until it reaches Dederang, where it starts to wind through the valleys of the Victorian Alps, eventually terminating at the intersection with Bogong High Plains Road in Mount Beauty. From Mount Beauty, Bogong High Plains Road takes a winding and twisty route via the Falls Creek alpine resort to meet Omeo Highway at Glen Valley.

== History ==
Within Victoria, the passing of the Country Roads Act 1912 through the Parliament of Victoria provided for the establishment of the Country Roads Board (later VicRoads) and their ability to declare Main Roads, taking responsibility for the management, construction and care of the state's major roads from local municipalities. Dederang Road was declared a Main Road from Dederang to Mount Beauty (and continuing northwards from Dederang to Yackandandah) on 30 November 1914.

The passing of the Developmental Roads Act 1918 through the Parliament of Victoria allowed the Country Road Board to declare Developmental Roads, serving to develop any area of land by providing access to a railway station for primary producers. Kiewa-Wodonga Road between Kiewa and Baranduda was declared a Developmental Road on 16 August 1919; this section was later re-declared as a Main Road on 13 May 1929.

In the 1950s the road was sealed and realigned to Mount Beauty to permit the transport of materials for the construction of the Kiewa Hydroelectric Scheme.

The passing of the Highways and Vehicles Act 1924 provided for the declaration of State Highways, roads two-thirds financed by the state government through the Country Roads Board. Kiewa Valley Highway was declared a State Highway in the 1959/60 financial year, from Bandiana via Kiewa and Dederang to Mount Beauty (for a total of 49 miles), subsuming the original declaration of Kiewa-Wodonga Road and Dederang Road (between Dederang and Mount Beauty) as Main Roads; before this declaration, this road was also referred to as Kiewa Valley Road.

Kiewa Valley Highway was signed as State Route 191 between Bandiana and Mount Beauty in 1986; with Victoria's conversion to the newer alphanumeric system in the late 1990s, this was replaced by route C531.

The passing of the Road Management Act 2004 through the Parliament of Victoria granted the responsibility of overall management and development of Victoria's major arterial roads to VicRoads: VicRoads re-declared the road in 2004 as Kiewa Valley Highway (Arterial #6790), from Bandiana to Mount Beauty.

== Major intersections ==
LGA	Location	km	mi	Destinations	Notes
Wodonga	Bandiana	0.0	0.0	Murray Valley Highway (B400) – Wodonga, Tallangatta, Corryong	Northern terminus of highway and route C531
Wodonga	Baranduda	4.3	2.7	Yackandandah–Wodonga Road (C527) – Yackandandah, Myrtleford	
Wodonga–Indigo boundary	Staghorn Flat–Kiewa boundary	11.4	7.1	Allans Flat Road (C533) – Allans Flat, Yackandandah	Concurrency with route C533
Indigo	Kiewa	14.4	8.9	Kiewa East Road (C533) – Tangambalanga	Concurrency with route C533
Alpine	Dederang	41.4	25.7	Dederang Road (C528) – Yackandandah	
Alpine	Running Creek	53.1	33.0	Running Creek Road (C534) – Myrtleford, Wangaratta	
Alpine	Tawonga–Tawonga South boundary	75.6	47.0	Tawonga Gap Road (C536) – Bright, Mount Buffalo	
Alpine	Mount Beauty	79.2	49.2	Bogong High Plains Road (C531 southeast) – Falls Creek, Omeo; Lakeside Avenue (northeast) – Mount Beauty	Southern terminus of highway at roundabout Route C531 continues south along Bogong High Plains Road
Concurrency terminus; Route transition

== See also ==
- Highways in Australia
- Highways in Victoria
