= Indigo Valley =

- Town
- Coordinates: 36°11′18″S 146°44′48″E
- Country: Australia
- State: Victoria
- Region: Hume
- LGA: Shire of Indigo

Government
  - State electorate: Benambra
  - Federal division: Indi

Population
  - Total: 561 (2006 census)
- Postcode: 3688

Indigo Valley is a locality in Victoria, Australia stretching approximately between Yackandandah and the Hume Highway near Barnawartha. The Indigo Creek flows through it.

Indigo Valley was formerly part of the Shire of Chiltern but now forms part of the Shire of Indigo, to which it lends its name.

Indigo Valley has a Country Fire Authority volunteer fire brigade and a state primary school called Middle Indigo Primary School.

The population of Indigo Valley was 561 in the Australian 2006 Census
