= Howlong =

- Town
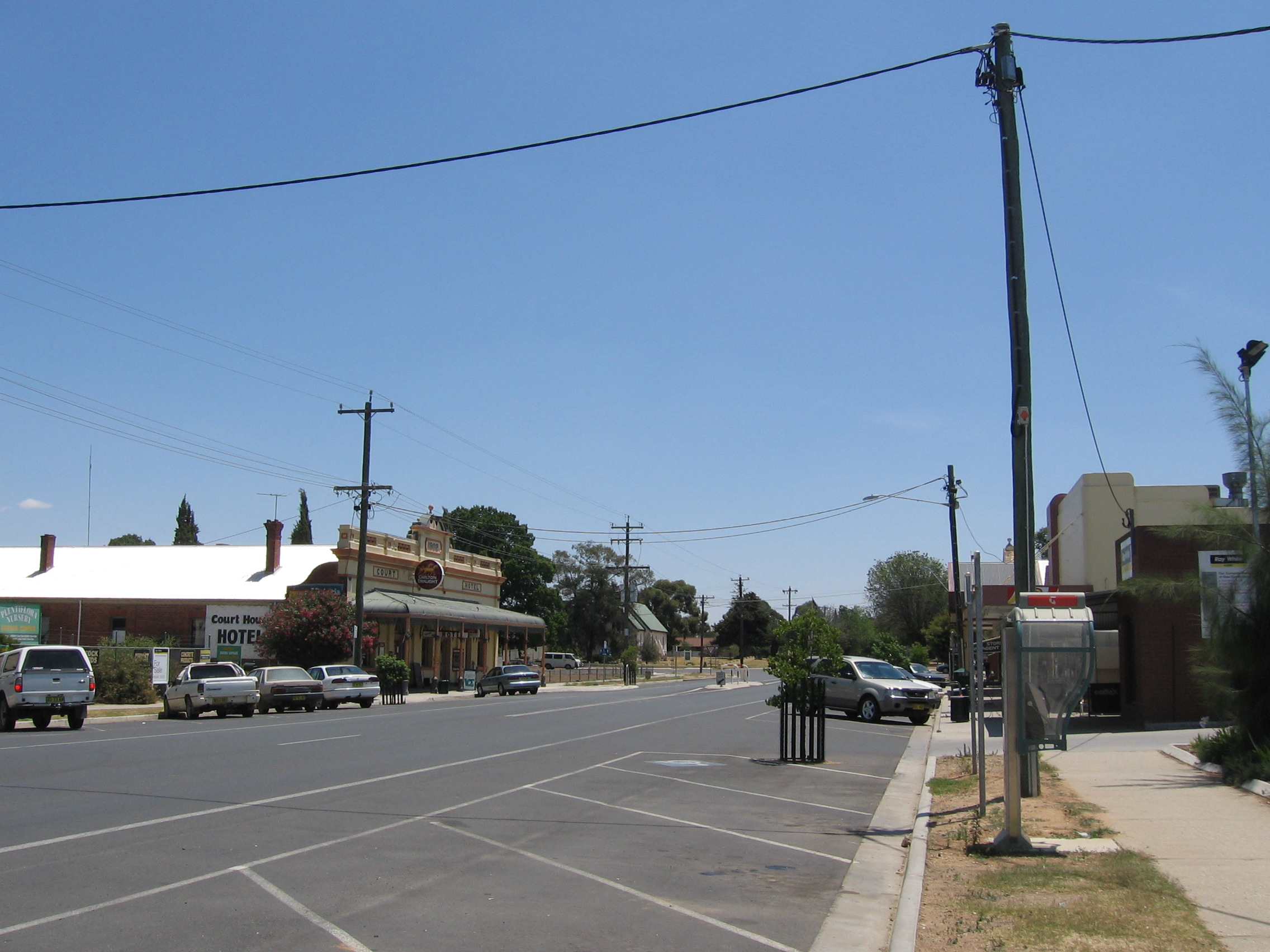
- The main street of Howlong

- Coordinates: 35°58′0″S 146°38′0″E
- Country: Australia
- State: New South Wales
- LGA: Federation Council
- Location: 582 km (362 mi) SW of Sydney; 297 km (185 mi) NE of Melbourne; 29 km (18 mi) W of Albury
- Established: 1854

Government
  - State electorate: Albury
  - Federal division: Farrer

Population
  - Total: 2,997 (2021 census)
- Postcode: 2643
- County: Hume
Localities around Howlong
		Moorwatha
	Howlong
Gooramadda	Browns Plains	Barnawatha North

Howlong /ˈhaʊlɒŋ/ is a town 28 kilometres (17 mi) west of Albury, and is situated on the Murray River which separates the Australian states of New South Wales and Victoria. The town is located on the Riverina Highway. There is a bridge across the Murray into Victoria. Howlong is in the Federation Council local government area. At the 2021 census, Howlong had a population of 2,997.

== History ==
Prior to the founding of the township the Surveyor-General of New South Wales at that time Major Thomas Mitchell crossed the Murray River during his exploration of the area. There is a monument to Mitchell on the Victorian side of the river which states that Mitchell and his party camped at the location on 17 October 1836 and then crossed the river slightly downstream of their camping point on the following day.

Two years later Joseph Hawdon and Charles Bonney, Hawdon with a property in 'Western Port of Melbourne the capitol of Port Philip', set off on the second longest cattle drive of its kind attempted in Australia at that time driving 300 head from Howlong to Adelaide South Australia.

Hawdon's diary states:

The banks of the Hume (Murray at Howlong) are well adapted for grazing stock, at least on the flats, and around the broad lagoons that join the river, some of which extend as much as three miles. Here also is a large plain, nine miles broad, called by the natives 'oolong'; the cattle appear to be very fond grazing upon it, although the land is not good, and the grass not so rich as nearer the river.

Also in 1838 the site of the Mitchell river crossing became the location of the first postage mail delivery by a mail carrier, John Conway Bourke when he undertook to deliver the overland mail from Sydney to what would later be called Melbourne.

The township appears to have taken its title from a property named Hoolong in the area which was owned by Isaac Rudd and was named after an Aboriginal place name meaning 'beginning of the plains'. Howlong as a township was laid out in 1854. The Post Office opened on 1 January 1861. It has frequently been noted on lists of unusual place names.

== Today ==
Howlong is now an important inland township which services the smaller villages of the area with a range of stores that meet most of the everyday needs of the people of the area. Nearby villages in the area include Brocklesby, Walbundrie and Chiltern.

The town is the subject in the song "By the time I get to Howlong" from Spiderbait's album Grand Slam.

== Sport ==
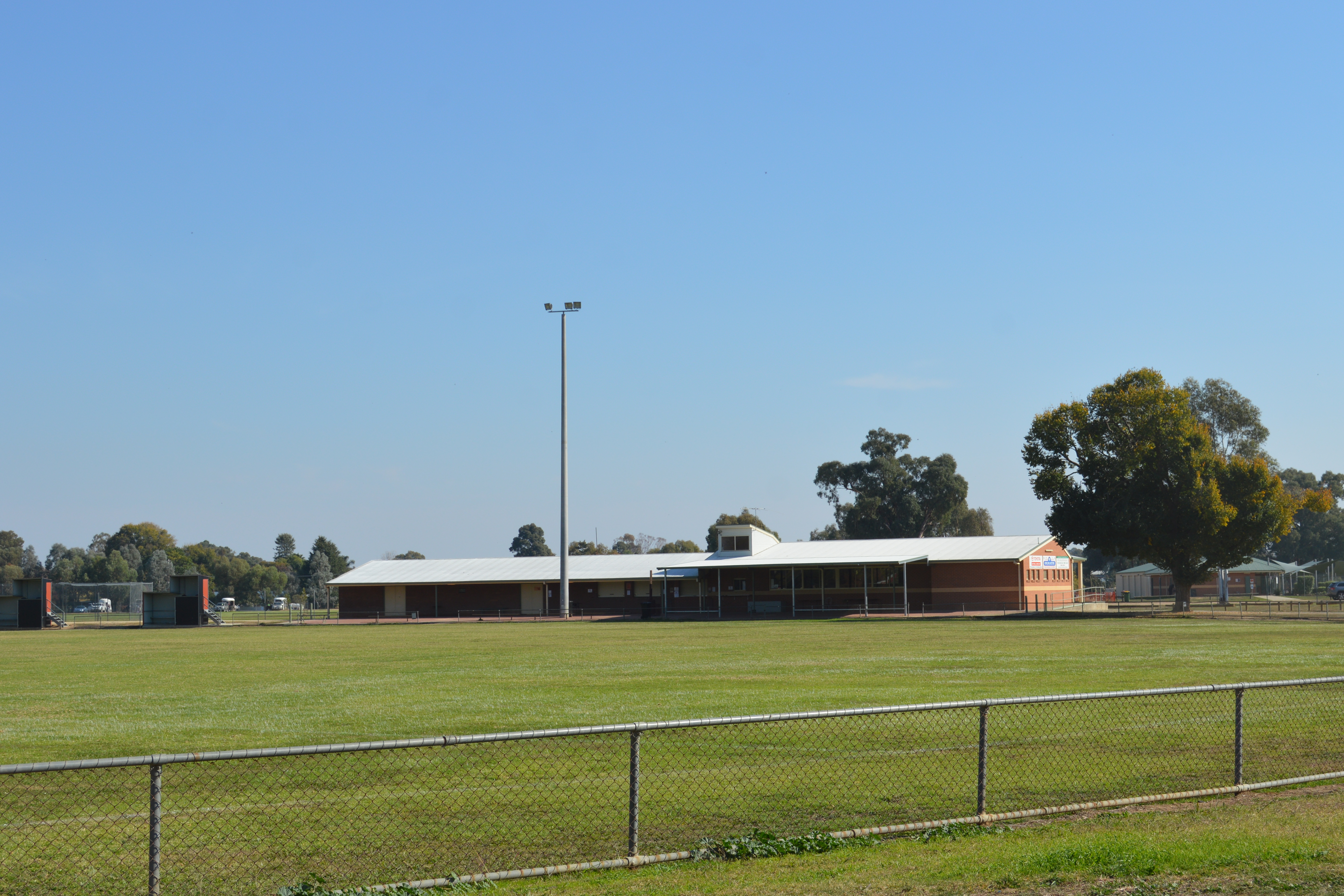
Howlong Football Ground

Local sporting clubs include the Howlong Football Club, an Australian rules football team, which was established in 1897, and who have competed in the Hume Football League since 1953 and previously competed in the Chiltern & District Football Association in 1915 & 1916 and 1923 to 1952.

The Howlong Football Club played in the Ovens and Murray Football League from 1911 to 1914 and again in 1919.

Local golfing is done at the Howlong Golf Resort.

== Gallery ==
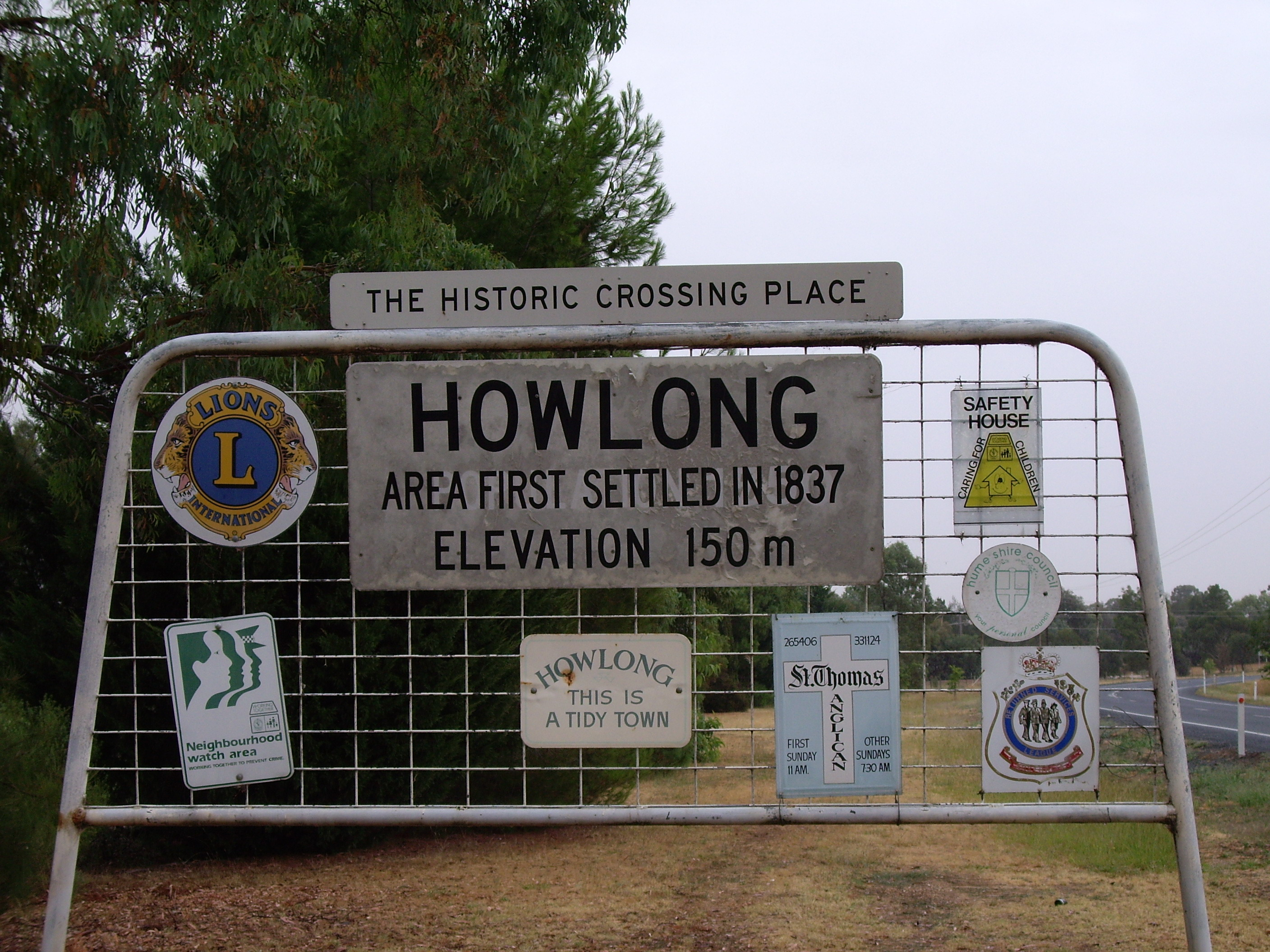
Entering Howlong

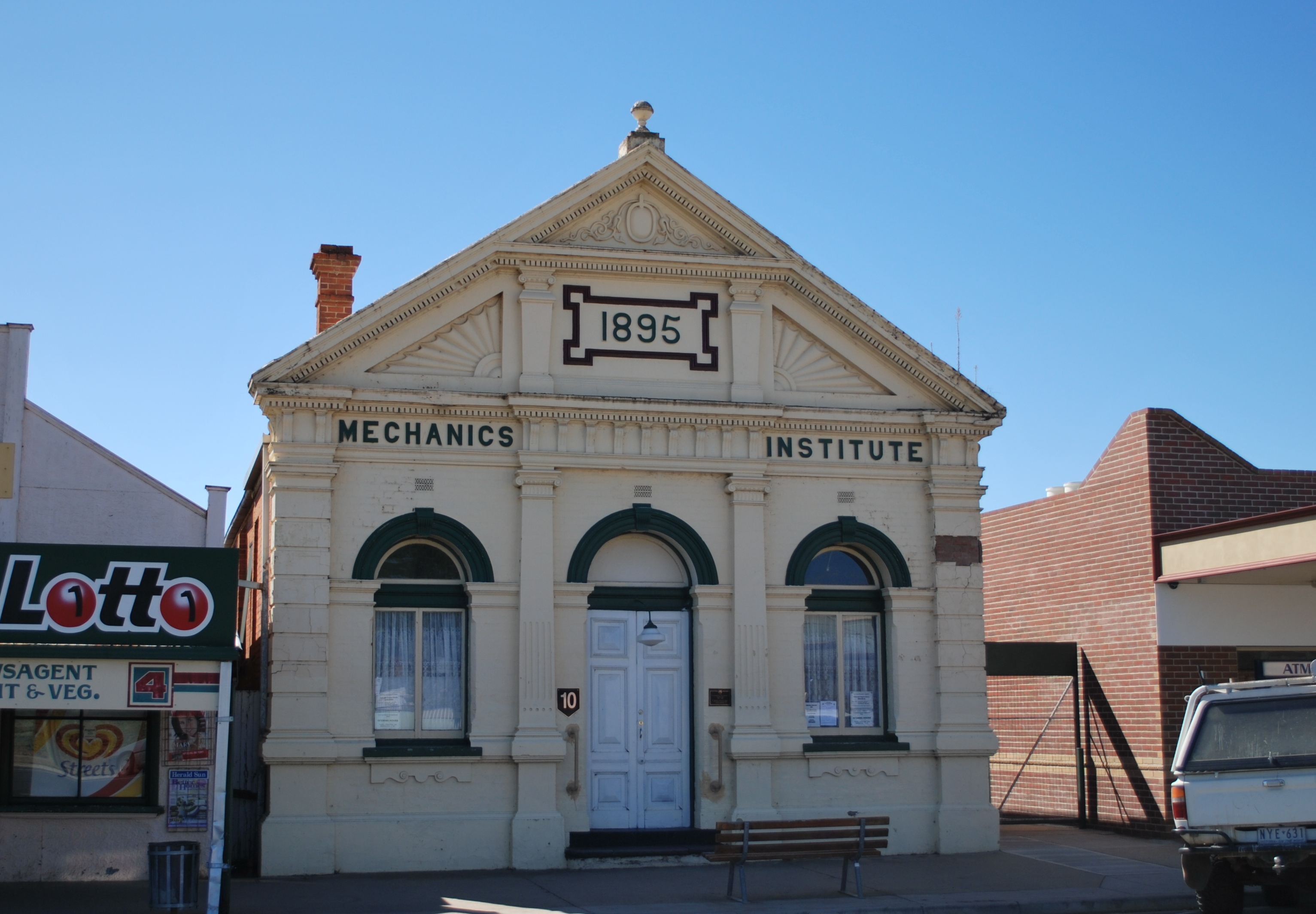
Mechanics Institute

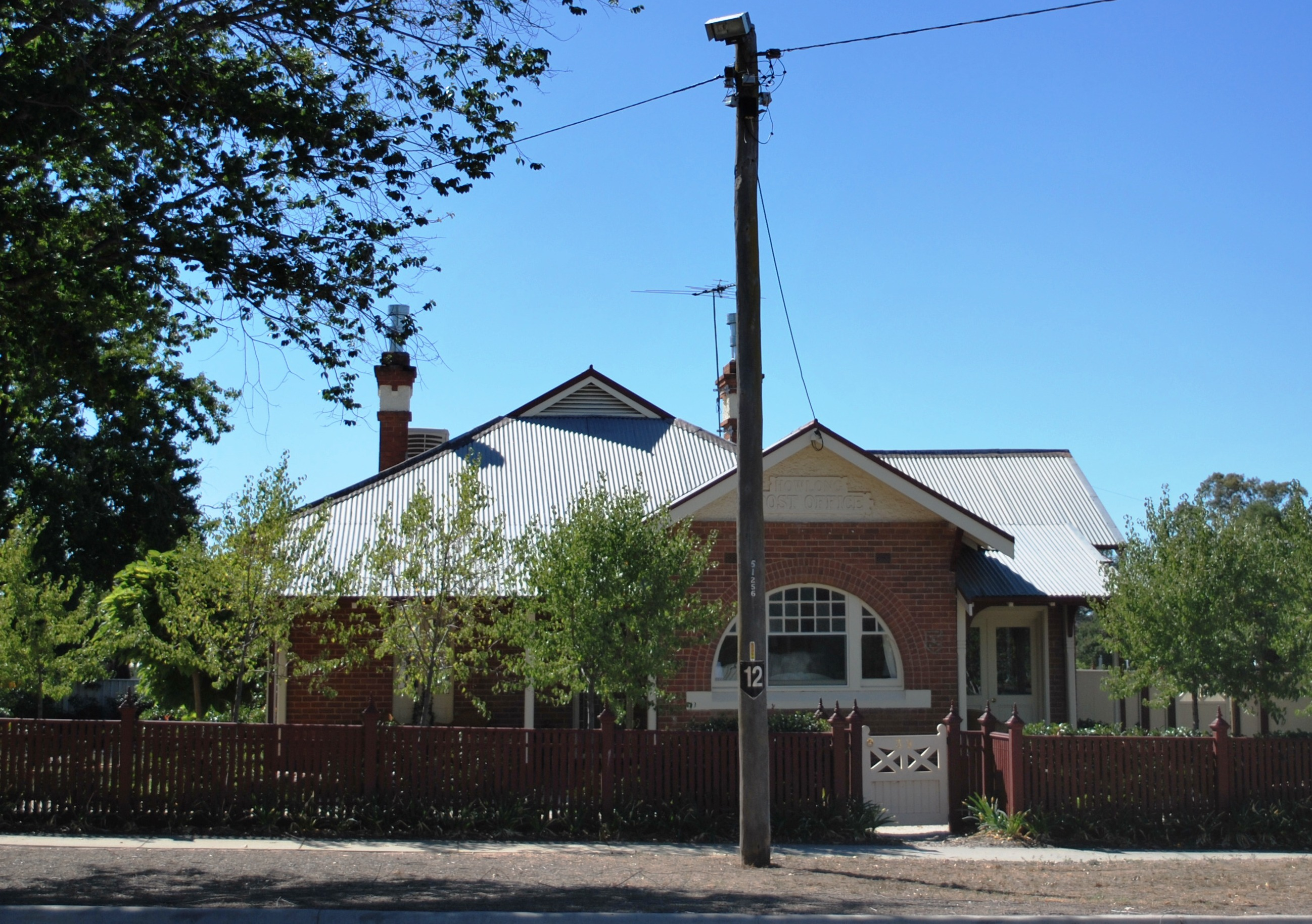
Old Post Office

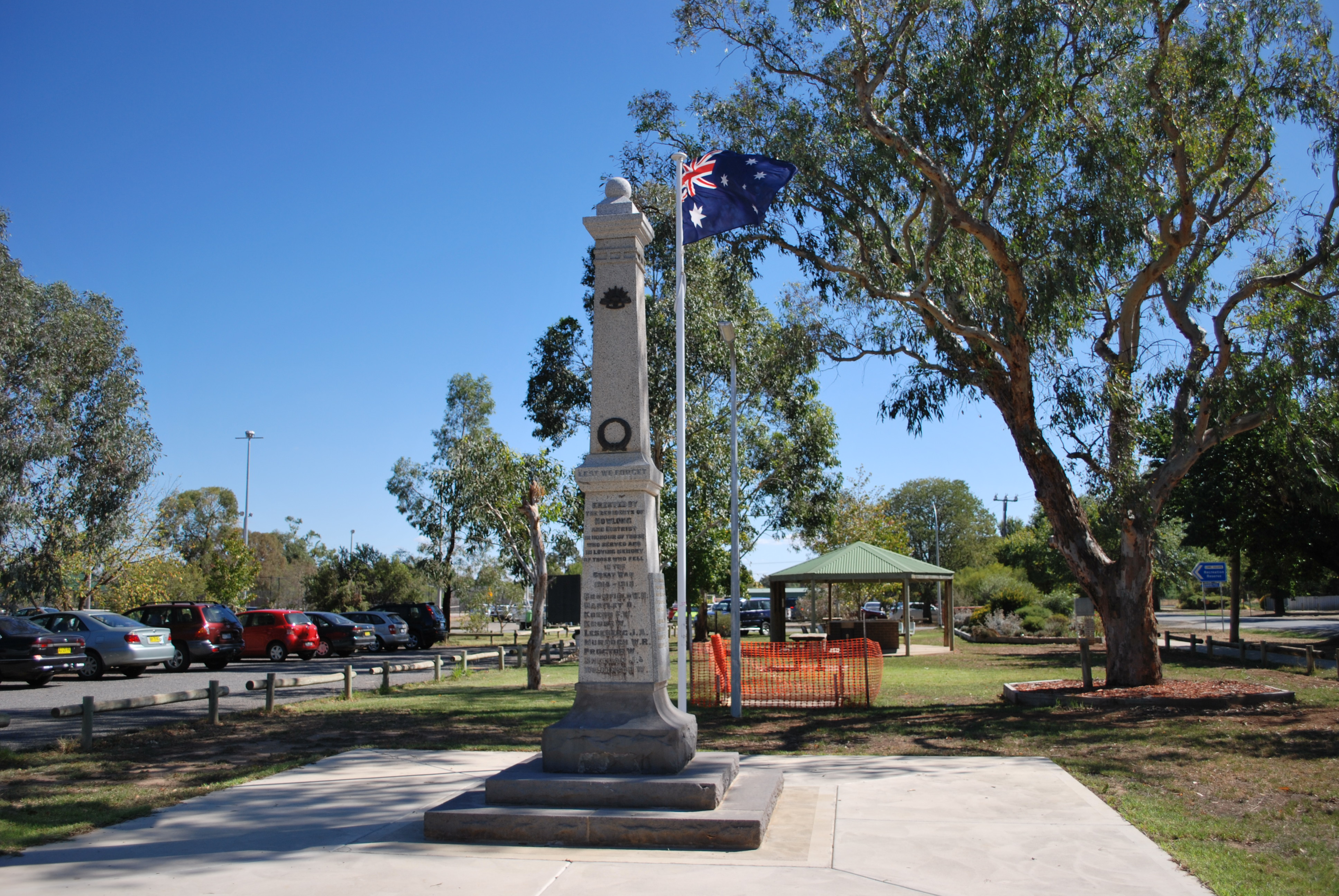
War Memorial

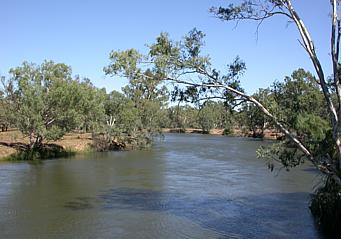
Murray River, Howlong
