= Huon, Victoria =

Huon
- Town
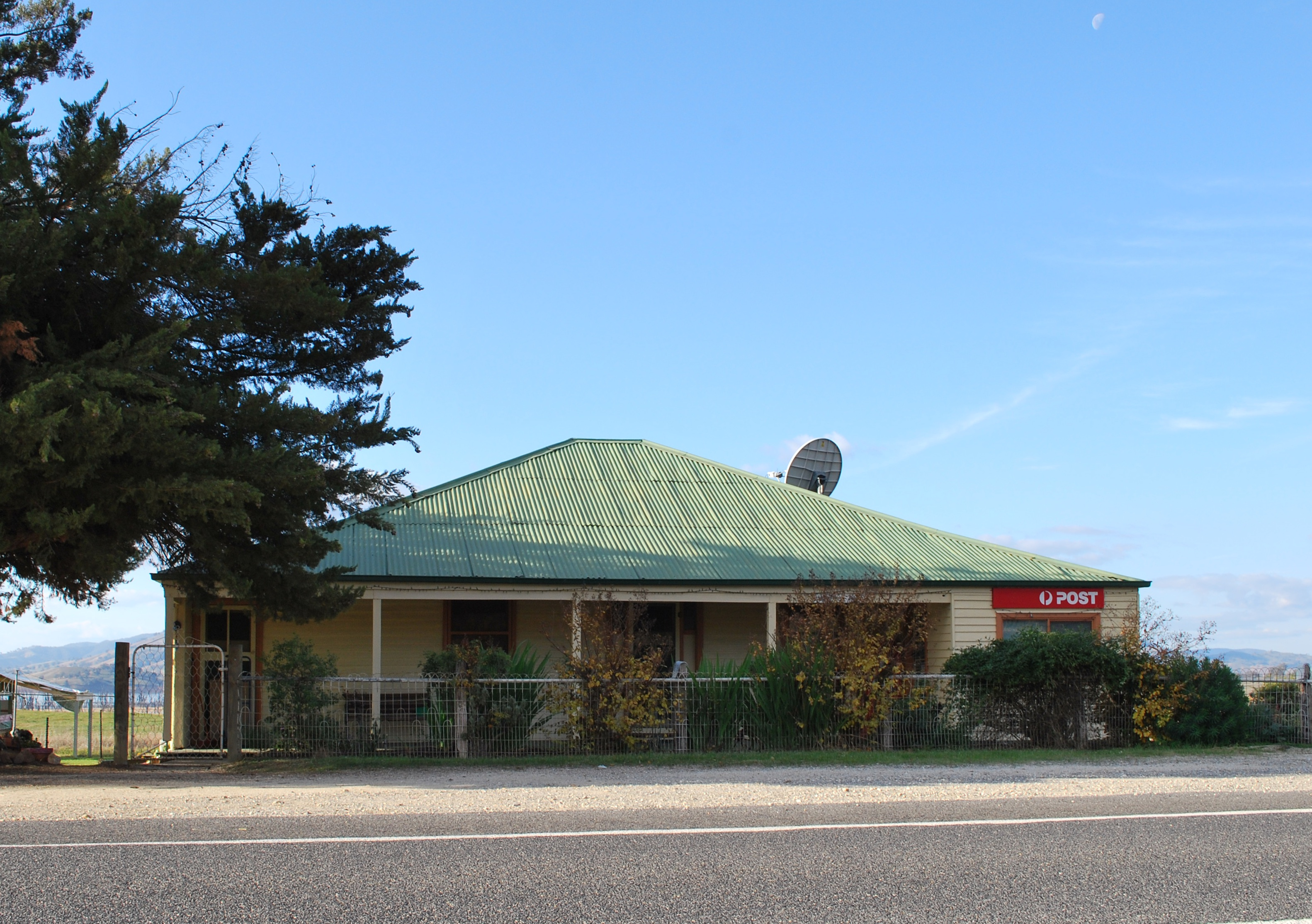
- Post office at Huon, on the Murray Valley Highway

- Coordinates: 36°13′42″S 147°04′40″E
- Country: Australia
- State: Victoria
- Region: Hume
- LGAs: Shire of Indigo; Shire of Towong
- Location: 347 km (216 mi) NE of Melbourne; 25 km (16 mi) SE of Wodonga; 17 km (11 mi) W of Tallangatta

Government
  - State electorate: Benambra
  - Federal division: Indi

Population
  - Total: 219 (2016 census)
- Postcode: 3695

Huon is a locality in north east Victoria, Australia. The locality is in the Shire of Indigo local government area and on Lake Hume, 347 kilometres (216 mi) north east of the state capital, Melbourne.

At the 2016 census, Huon had a population of 219.
