= Charleroi, Victoria =

Charleroi
- Town
- Coordinates: 36°18′31″S 147°9′12″E
- Country: Australia
- State: Victoria
- Region: Hume
- LGA: Shire of Indigo

Government
  - State electorate: Benambra
  - Federal division: Indi

Population
  - Total: 82 (2021 census)
- Postcode: 3695

Charleroi is a locality in the Shire of Indigo, Victoria, Australia. At the 2021 census, Charleroi had a population of 82.
