= Alf Trevillian =

Australian rules footballer

Personal information
- Full name: Alfred Trevillian
- Born: 22 April 1877; Cornishtown, Victoria
- Died: 2 December 1954 (aged 77); Brighton, Victoria
- Original team: Rutherglen
- Height: 180 cm (5 ft 11 in)
- Position: Ruck

Playing career^{1}
Years	Club	Games (Goals)
1902–1903, 1906	St Kilda	44 (12)
- ^{1} Playing statistics correct to the end of 1906.

Alfred Trevillian (22 April 1877 – 2 December 1954) was an Australian rules footballer who played for the St Kilda Football Club in the Victorian Football League (VFL).

== Statistics ==
Trevillian debuted at 25 years and 11 days and played until he was 29 years and 139 days. He was the 732nd player to appear, 4318th for most games played, and 4462nd for most goals kicked.
