= Baarmutha =

- Town
- Coordinates: 36°23′37″S 146°39′13″E
- Country: Australia
- State: Victoria
- Region: Hume
- LGA: Shire of Indigo
- Location: 299 km (186 mi) NE of Melbourne; 23 km (14 mi) W of Wodonga, Victoria; 6 km (3.7 mi) SW of Beechworth

Government
  - State electorate: Benambra
  - Federal division: Indi

Population
  - Total: 0
- Postcode: 3747

Baarmutha is a neighbourhood of Beechworth in the Shire of Indigo, Victoria, Australia.

== History ==
Originally known as Three Mile Creek, gold mining was performed in the area in the 19th century. The 1907 Victorian Municipal Directory and Gazetteer listed a population of 100 along with a public school and library.

Baarmutha Post Office opened on 1 October 1875 and closed in 1968.
