= Bruarong =

- Town
- Coordinates: 36°25′17″S 146°51′54″E
- Country: Australia
- State: Victoria
- Region: Hume
- LGA: Shire of Indigo

Government
  - State electorate: Benambra
  - Federal division: Indi

Population
  - Total: 114 (2021 census)
- Postcode: 3749

Bruarong is a locality in the Shire of Indigo, Victoria, Australia. At the 2021 census, Bruarong had a population of 114.

== History ==
The area that became Bruarong was originally known as "Sutton." It was one of two townships, along with neighbouring Hillsborough, established north of Stanley as a result of the gold rushes to Beechworth and Yackandandah around 1853. The settlement was later surveyed and officially renamed "Bruarong" when it was offered for sale.

There are differing accounts of the meaning of the name. One source gives its meaning as "neither flower nor fruit," while a contemporary newspaper account from 1869 reported that the name meant "Mountains of the Moon."

By the 1860s, miners in the area had turned to quartz mining. In 1864, new reefs were discovered near Kinchington's Creek, Hillsborough, and Bruarong, and quartz mining activity continued to increase throughout the decade. The Homeward Bound quartz mill was a significant operation in Bruarong, and other mines included the Birthday Reef and the Haphazard.

In 1869, a newspaper correspondent described Bruarong as being in a "transitionary state," with two hotels, two stores, and a school. Mining at the time was experiencing a downturn, with the Homeward Bound engine having suspended work due to hard quartz, though operations continued in the claim.The township was considered isolated, with residents of nearby towns reportedly reluctant to make the difficult descent over the steep range, and locals equally unwilling to make the return climb.

With the decline of mining in the early 20th century, the majority of the town blocks fell into disuse.
