= Allans Flat =

- Town
- Coordinates: 36°16′S 146°54′E
- Country: Australia
- State: Victoria
- Region: Hume
- LGA: Shire of Indigo

Government
  - State electorate: Benambra
  - Federal division: Indi

Population
  - Total: 297 (2021 census)
- Postcode: 3691

Allans Flat is a locality in Victoria, Australia. It is located along Osbornes Flat Road, north-east of Yackandandah. The areas around Allans Flat were mined for gold between the 1850s and 1904 though without sufficient population for a Post Office until 26 October 1876.

== History ==
Allans Flat was surveyed and proclaimed in 1905. The Post Office closed in 1975.

== Sport & Recreation ==
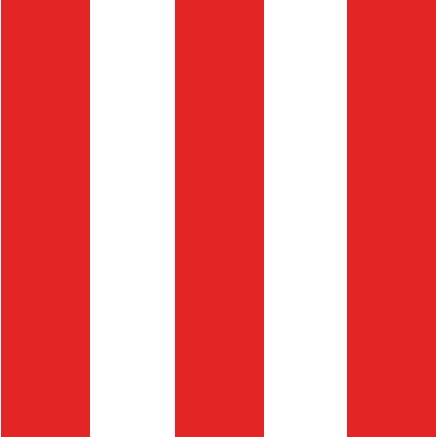
Allans Flat FC colours in 1924

In 1897, Osborne's Flat Football Club won the Weiss Football Trophy, in a competition between Osborne's Flat, Gundowring and Yackandandah.

The Allans Flat Football Club appears to of first been established in 1890.

The club was intermittently active over the next 15 years, then competed in the Murphy's Albion Hotel (Yackandandah) Football Association in 1906.

The club won a premiership in 1923 -

- Allans Flat & District Football Association
  - 1923 - Allan's Flats: 3.5 - 23 d Dederang: 0.6 - 6

Allan's Flat competed in the Kiewa Football Association from 1924 to 1926 and were runners up in 1925.

- 1925 - Tallangatta: 13.10 - 88 defeated Allan's Flat: 8.9 - 57

Allans Flat FC then competed in the Yackandandah & District Football League from 1929 to 1931, then appears to have gone into recess in 1932.
