= Peter Denahy =

Pete Denahy
- Born: 1972 (age 53–54)
- Genres: Country/Folk/Comedy/Bluegrass

Pete Denahy (born 1972) is an Australian entertainer from Yackandandah, Victoria, Australia. He sings and plays guitar, mandolin and fiddle. His most successful song was "Sort of Dunno Nothin'" which was a hit on YouTube and made the ARIA Top 100. It was on his Picture In A Frame album which made the top 30 of the ARIA Country Albums chart. Peter is married to Alison Denahy.

== Discography ==
=== Albums ===
List of albums, with selected details
Title	Details
Dyamberin	Released: 1993; Format: CD; Label: Peter Denahy
Over the Floodways	Released: 1996; Format: CD; Label: Peter Denahy (PD001CD)
The Petrol Head Fly	Released: 2002
Peter Denahy	Released: 2005; Format: CD; Label: Acmec Records Australia
Picture in a Frame	Released: 2008; Format: CD; Label: Compass Bros. (038CDCB)
All You Can Eat	Released: 2010; Format: CD, Digital; Label: Pete Denahy (PDCD003)
Wishbone Road	Released: 2012
Me	Released: 2014
Hiroshima Jam Session	Released: 2015
Singin' Shoes	Released: 2016
She Loves Me to the Moon	Released: September 2023; Label: Checked Label

=== Charting singles ===
List of singles, with selected chart positions
Title	Year	Peak chart positions	Album
Title	Year	AUS	Album
"Sorta Dunno Nothin'"	2008	100	Picture in a Frame

== Awards ==
=== Country Music Awards of Australia ===
The Country Music Awards of Australia (CMAA) (also known as the Golden Guitar Awards) is an annual awards night held in January during the Tamworth Country Music Festival, celebrating recording excellence in the Australian country music industry. They have been held annually since 1973.

Year	Nominee / work	Award	Result (wins only)
2011	"Every Time He Travels Through Cloncurry" (Written by Pete Denahy, Recorded by Luke Austen)	Bush Ballad of the Year	Won
2013	Yackandandah1852	Instrumental of the Year	Won
2014	"Cotton Eyed Joe"	Instrumental of the Year	Won
2016	"Cluck Old Hen"	Instrumental of the Year	Won
2016	"Singin' Shoes"	Bluegrass Recording of the Year	Won

=== Tamworth Songwriters Awards ===
The Tamworth Songwriters Association (TSA) is an annual songwriting contest for original country songs, awarded in January at the Tamworth Country Music Festival. They commenced in 1986. Peter Denahy has won four awards.

Year	Nominee / work	Award	Result (wins only)
1993	"Cantankerous Gramaphone" by Pete Denahy	Comedy/ Novelty Song of the Year	awarded
2000	"Bruce the Spider" by Pete Denahy	Comedy/ Novelty Song of the Year	Won
2001	"The Dung Beetle" by Pete Denahy	Comedy/ Novelty Song of the Year	Won
2022	Pete Denahy	Songmaker Award	awarded
