= Wooragee =

- Town
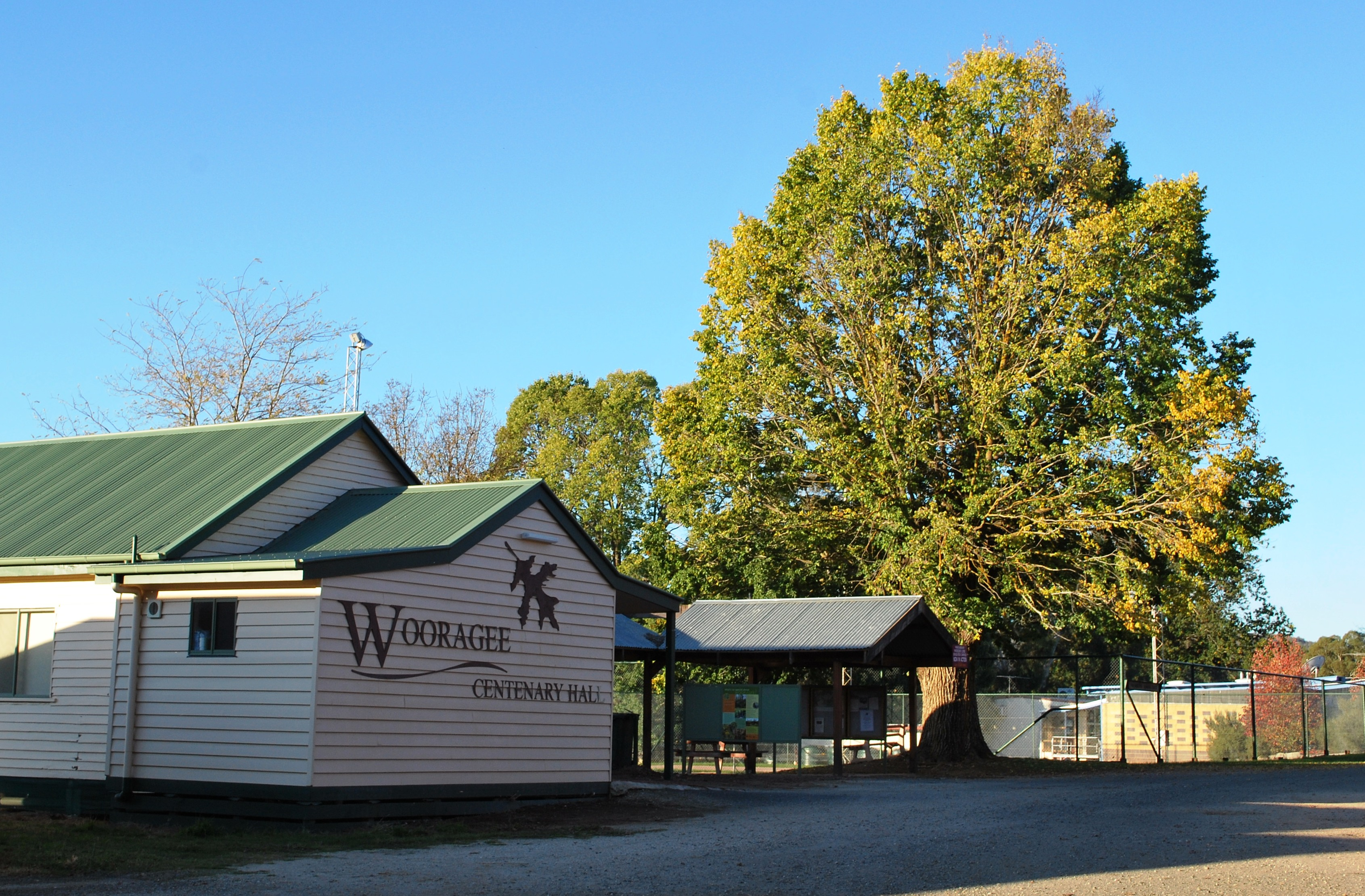
- Centenary Hall at Wooragee, 2009

- Interactive map of Wooragee
- Coordinates: 36°17′25″S 146°43′48″E
- Country: Australia
- State: Victoria
- Region: Hume
- LGA: Shire of Indigo
- Location: 295 km (183 mi) NE of Melbourne; 30 km (19 mi) SW of Wodonga; 9 km (5.6 mi) N of Beechworth

Government
  - State electorate: Benambra
  - Federal division: Indi

Population
  - Total: 345 (2016 census)
- Postcode: 3747

Wooragee is a locality in north east Victoria, Australia. The locality is in the Shire of Indigo local government area, 295 kilometres (183 mi) north east of the state capital, Melbourne.

At the 2016 census, Wooragee had a population of 345.

A small township exists in which is located a rural fire brigade, a public hall, public toilets, a small park, a tennis court and a state primary school.
