= Browns Plains, Victoria =

Browns Plains
- Town
- Coordinates: 36°2′46″S 146°37′26″E
- Country: Australia
- State: Victoria
- Region: Hume
- LGA: Shire of Indigo

Government
  - State electorate: Benambra
  - Federal division: Indi

Population
  - Total: 99 (2021 census)
- Postcode: 3685

Browns Plains is a locality in the Shire of Indigo, Victoria, Australia. At the 2021 census, Browns Plains had a population of 99.
