= Gooramadda =

- Town
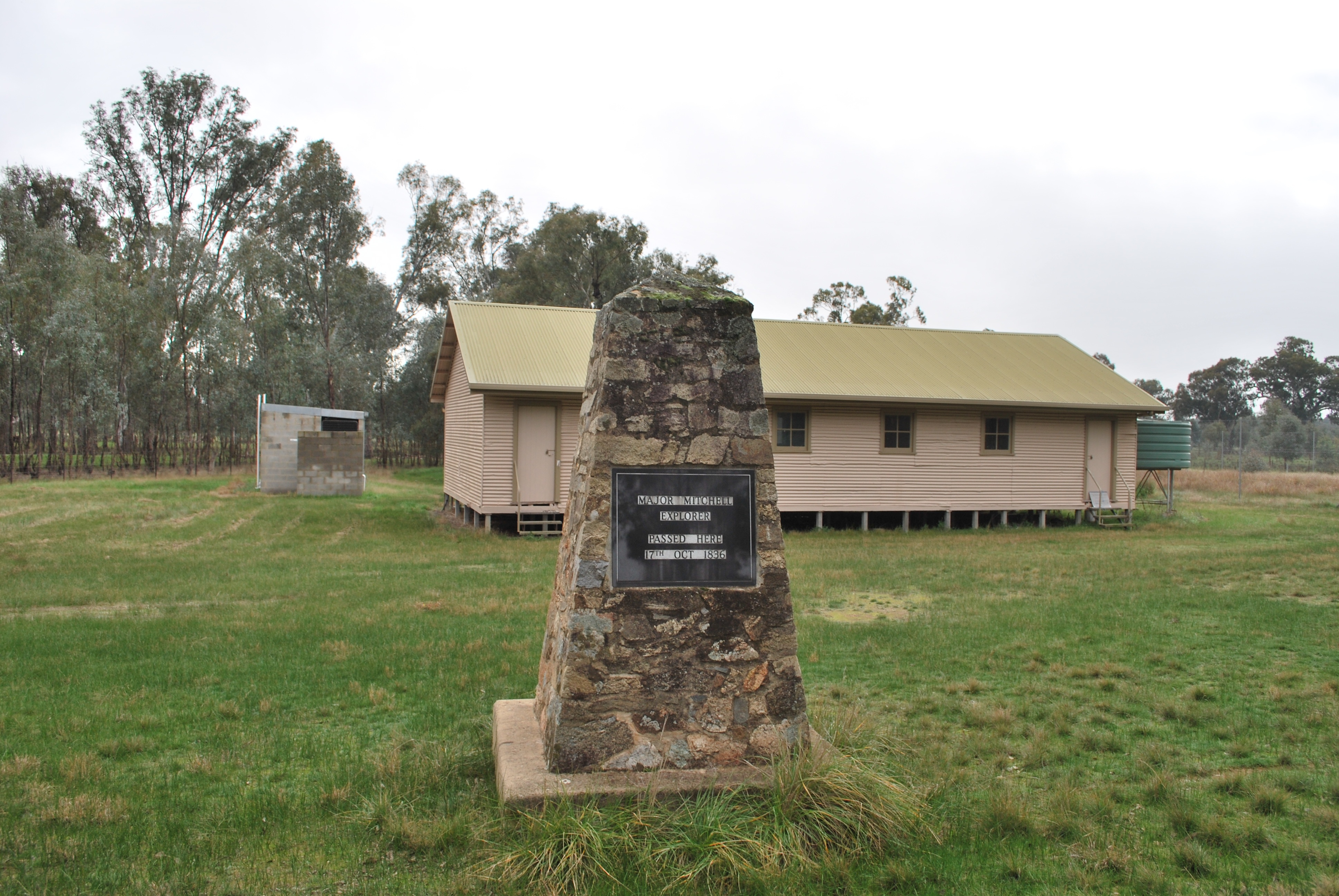
- Monument to explorer Thomas Mitchell in front of the Gooramadda Hall, 2010

- Coordinates: 36°01′00″S 146°37′07″E
- Country: Australia
- State: Victoria
- Region: Hume
- LGA: Shire of Indigo
- Location: 308 km (191 mi) NE of Melbourne; 30 km (19 mi) W of Wodonga; 5 km (3.1 mi) S of Howlong (NSW)

Government
  - State electorate: Benambra
  - Federal division: Indi

Population
  - Total: 58 (2016 census)
- Postcode: 3685

Gooramadda is a locality in north-east Victoria, Australia. It is on the Murray River, in the Shire of Indigo local government area, 308 kilometres (191 mi) north-east of the state capital, Melbourne.

Gooramadda played Australian Rules Football in the Chiltern & District Football Association in 1920 and 1921.

At the 2016 census, Gooramadda had a population of 58.
