= John Conway Bourke =

Australian mailman

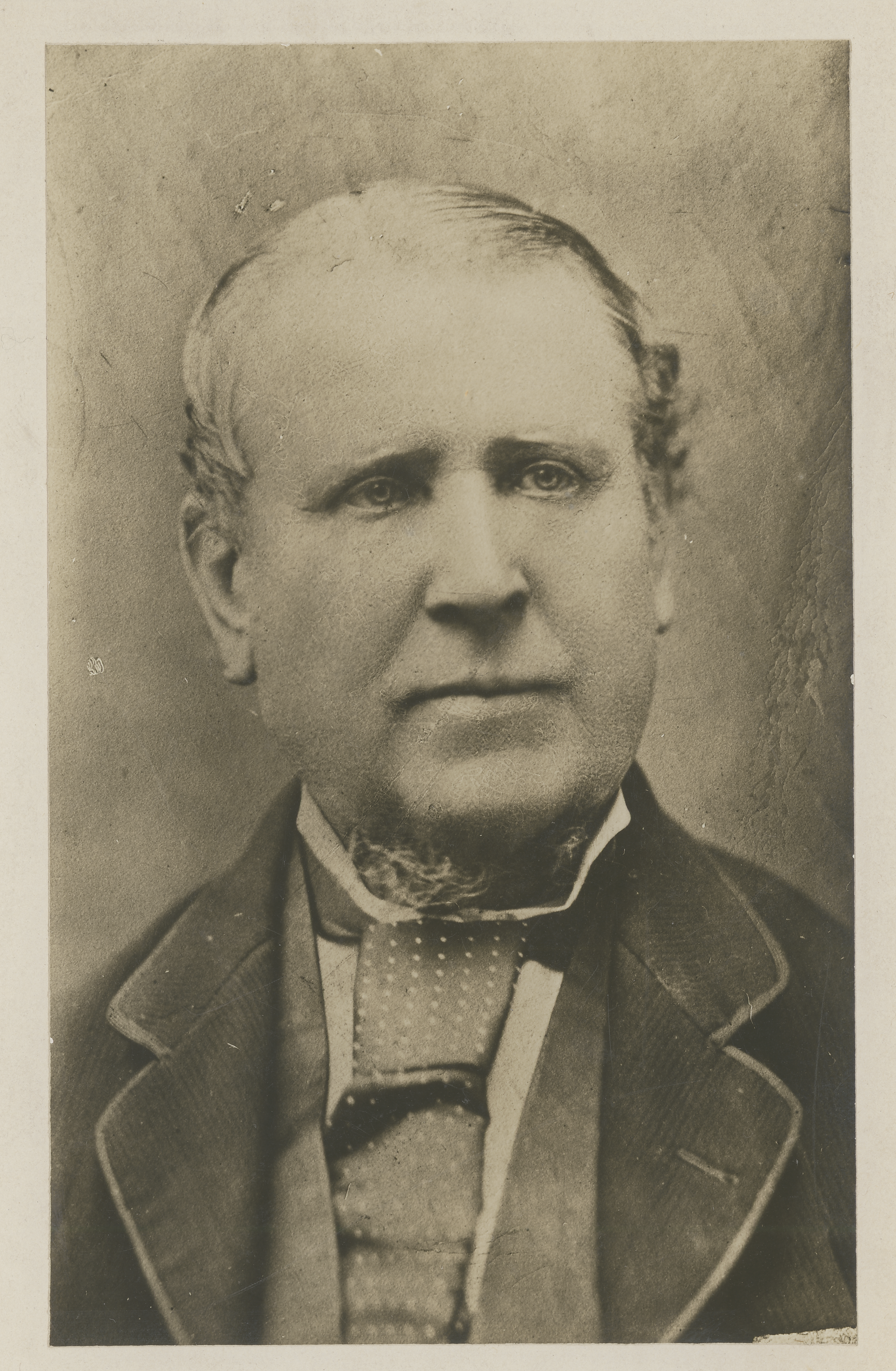
- John Conway Bourke circa 1870-1880
- Born: 24 June 1815; Rathkeale, Limerick, Ireland
- Died: 5 August 1902 (aged 87); Flemington, Victoria, Australia
- Burial place: Melbourne General Cemetery
- Occupation: Mailman

John Conway Bourke (24 June 1815, Rathkeale, Limerick, Ireland – 5 August 1902, Flemington, Victoria, Australia) was Victoria's first overland mailman.

== Life ==
John Conway Bourke was born in Rathkeale, Limerick, Ireland in 1815 and arrived in Australia as a convict in 1836.

Bourke took a job as a mailman in 1838, carrying the first overland mail from Melbourne to Howlong in New South Wales. He was employed by Joseph Hawdon. Bourke continued in this role until 1841 when coach services took over.

It was at Bourke's suggestion that camels were used for the Burke and Wills expedition, and this led to him being credited as one of the originated of the expedition.

He was given a position at the General Post Office, though took other jobs such as first licensee of Melbourne's Westernport Hotel, and spent ten years in New Zealand during the gold rush. He returned to Melbourne in 1871 and worked for the Post Office until 1883.

Bourke died in 1902, aged 87. He was buried at Melbourne General Cemetery where a memorial to him was erected in 1928. The John Conway Burke Bridge in Howlong, New South Wales was named after Bourke.

Papers relating to John Conway Bourke are held by Royal Historical Society of Victoria. Additional materials are held by National Archives of Australia.
