= Dederang =

- Town
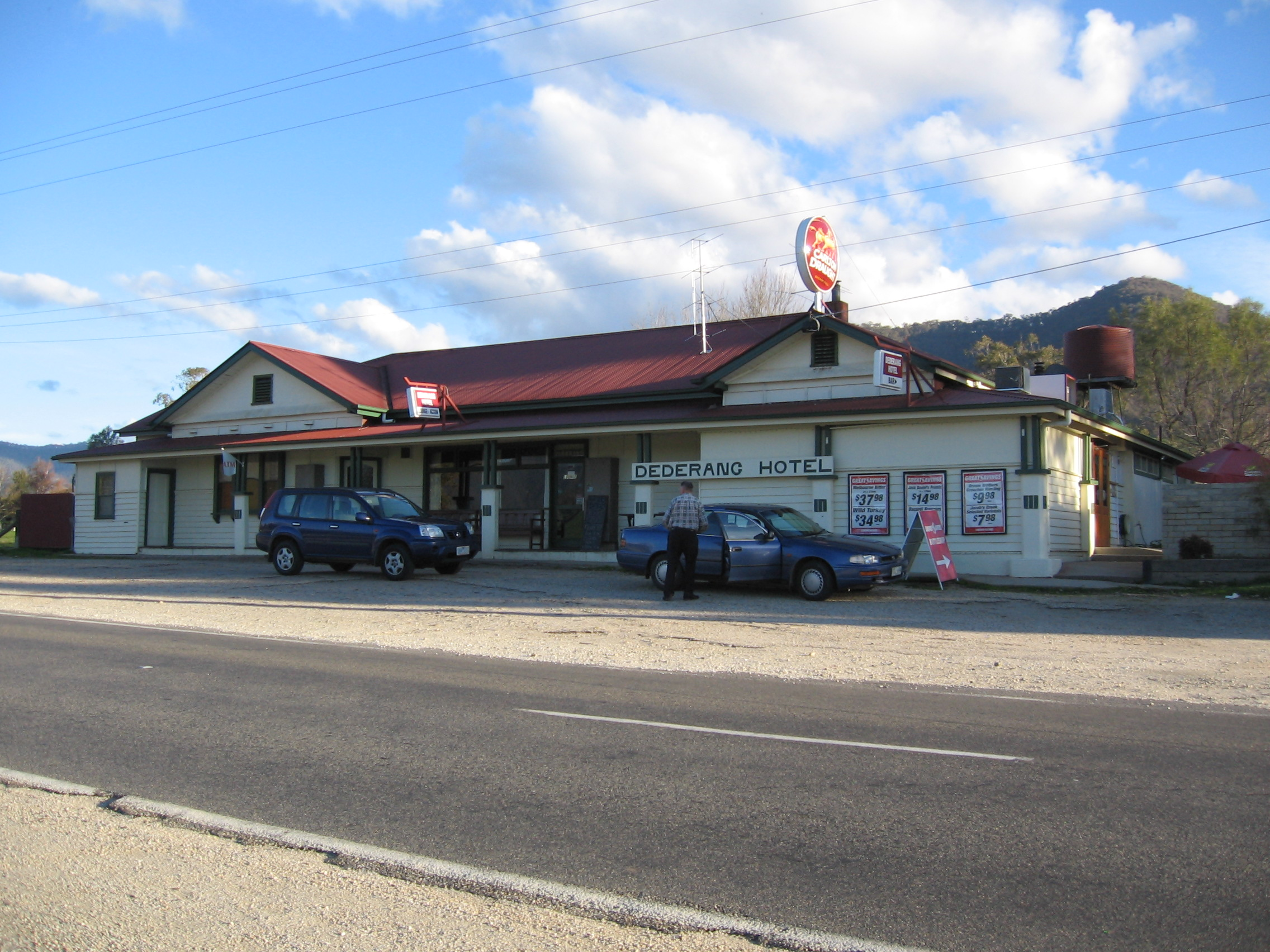
- The Dederang Hotel

- Interactive map of Dederang
- Coordinates: 36°29′0″S 147°01′0″E
- Country: Australia
- State: Victoria
- Region: Hume
- LGA: Alpine Shire
- Location: 329 km (204 mi) north east of Melbourne; 48 km (30 mi) south of Wodonga; 39 km (24 mi) north west of Mount Beauty; 24 km (15 mi) south east of Yackandandah

Government
  - State electorate: Ovens Valley
  - Federal division: Indi
- Elevation: 271 m (889 ft)

Population
  - Total: 198 (2021 census)
- Postcode: 3691
- Mean max temp: 26.6 °C (79.9 °F)
- Mean min temp: 10.1 °C (50.2 °F)
- Annual rainfall: 769.7 mm (30.30 in)

Dederang is a town in north east Victoria. The town is located on the Kiewa Valley Highway, in the Alpine Shire Local government in Australia, 329 kilometres from the state capital, Melbourne. Dederang is located in the Kiewa River valley. At the 2006 census, Dederang and the surrounding area had a population of 422.

Dederang Post Office opened on 1 September 1877 and closed in 1977.

The town is a popular trout and cod fishing location. It also holds a once-a-year Picnic Race meeting on the last Saturday in February. The races or versions of it have been held for over 160 years.

The town, in conjunction with neighbouring township Mount Beauty, has an Australian Rules football team Dederang-Mount Beauty competing in the Tallangatta & District Football League.

Golfers play at the Dederang Golf Club on the Kiewa Valley Highway.

Other notable clubs are the Dederang Bowls Club, Dederang Cricket Club and the Dederang & District Trail Riding Club.

The Dederang Hotel was purchased in 2025 by actor Shane Jacobson and a group of investors after Dave McKnight owned it for more than three decades. It was officially reopened in December 2025 following renovations under the new ownership.
