= Tawonga =

- Town
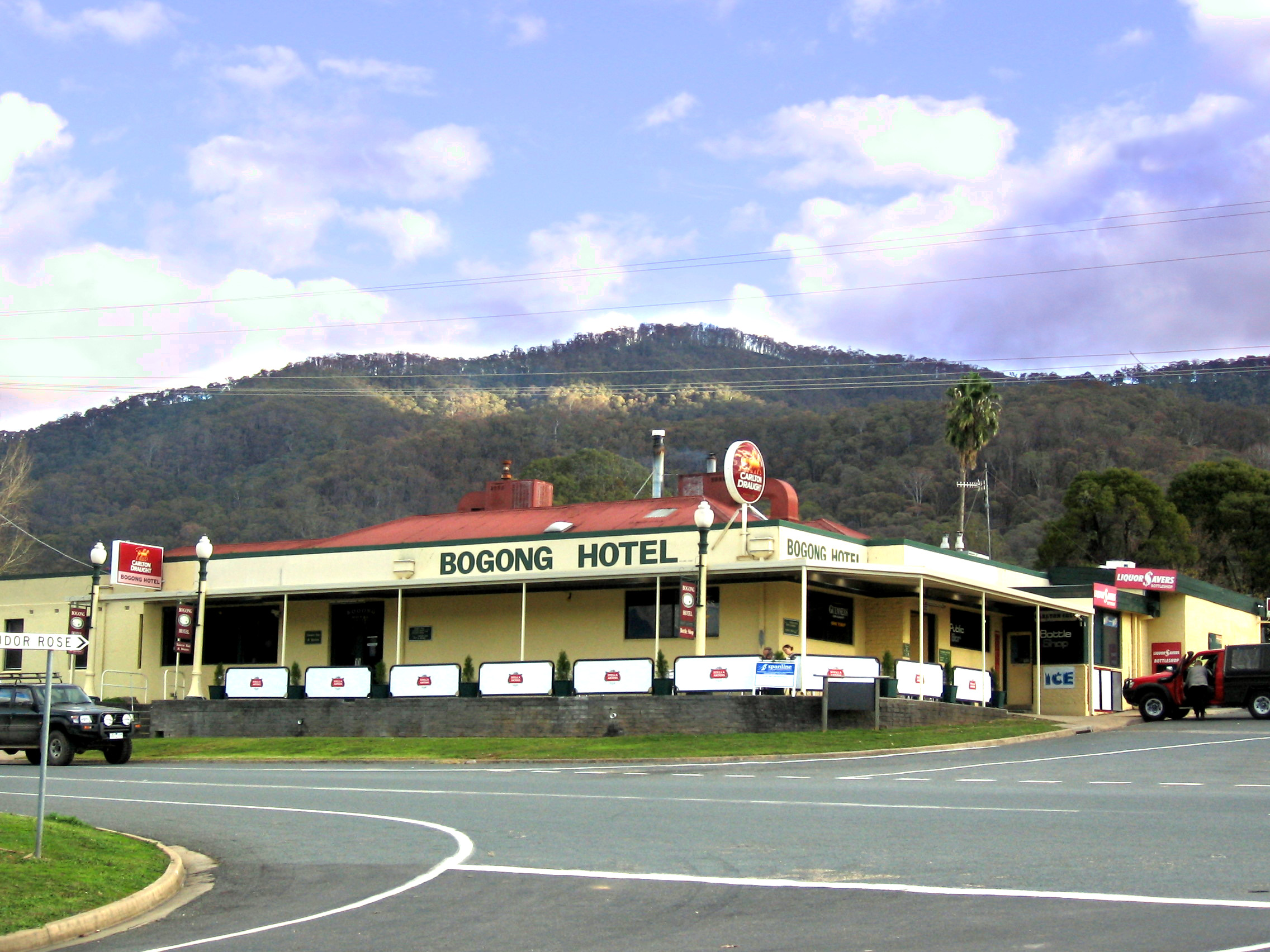
- The Bogong Hotel at Tawonga (destroyed by fire in 2011)

- Interactive map of Tawonga
- Coordinates: 36°38′0″S 147°06′0″E
- Country: Australia
- State: Victoria
- Region: Hume
- LGA: Alpine Shire
- Location: 350 km (220 mi) north east of Melbourne; 76 km (47 mi) south of Wodonga; 103 km (64 mi) east of Wangaratta; 56 km (35 mi) east of Myrtleford; 12 km (7.5 mi) north of Mount Beauty

Government
  - State electorate: Benambra
  - Federal division: Indi
- Elevation: 330 m (1,080 ft)

Population
  - Total: 568 (2021 census)
- Postcode: 3697
- Mean max temp: 20.3 °C (68.5 °F)
- Mean min temp: 7.4 °C (45.3 °F)
- Annual rainfall: 1,017 mm (40.0 in)

Tawonga is a town in northeast Victoria, Australia. The town is on the Kiewa Valley Highway, in the Alpine Shire local government area, 350 kilometres (217 mi) northeast of the state capital, Melbourne. At the 2021 census, Tawonga had a population of 568.

Tawonga Post Office opened on 4 October 1879.

December 5th 2011 the Country Fire Authority was alerted of a fire at the 125 year old Bogong pub. The building was destroyed.
