= Brimin =

- Town
- Coordinates: 36°3′11″S 146°35′14″E
- Country: Australia
- State: Victoria
- Region: Hume
- LGA: Shire of Indigo

Government
  - State electorate: Benambra
  - Federal division: Indi

Population
  - Total: 56 (2021 census)
- Postcode: 3685

Brimin is a locality in the Shire of Indigo, Victoria, Australia. At the 2021 census, Brimin had a population of 56.
