= Kiewa =

- Town
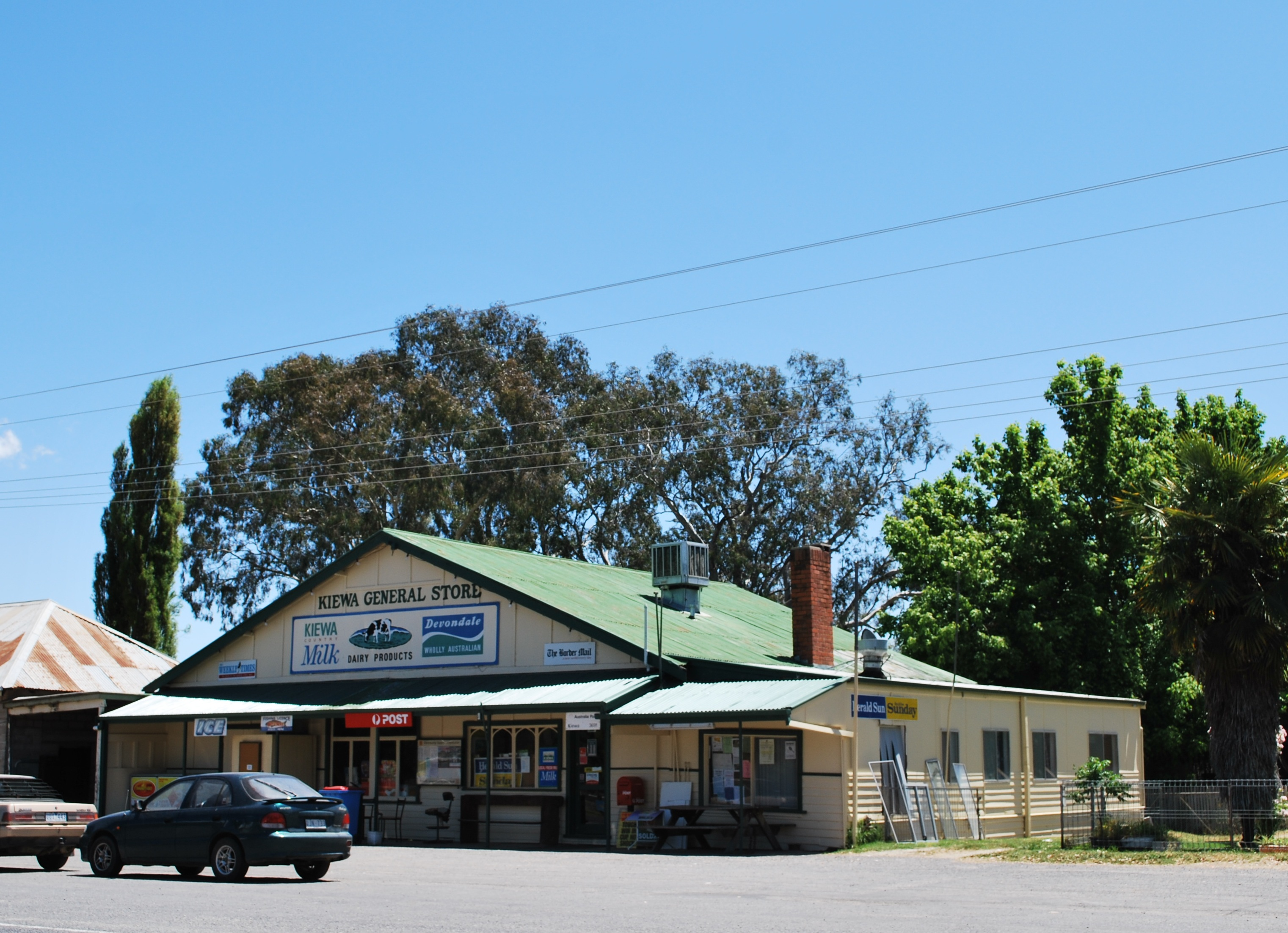
- General store at Kiewa, 2009

- Coordinates: 36°15′18″S 147°01′00″E
- Country: Australia
- State: Victoria
- Region: Hume
- LGA: Shire of Indigo
- Location: 343 km (213 mi) NE of Melbourne; 21 km (13 mi) SE of Wodonga; 2 km (1.2 mi) W of Tangambalanga

Government
  - State electorate: Benambra
  - Federal division: Indi

Population
  - Total: 474 (2016 census)
- Postcode: 3691

Kiewa is a locality in north east Victoria, Australia. The locality is in the Shire of Indigo local government area and on the Kiewa River, 343 kilometres (213 mi) north east of the state capital, Melbourne.

At the 2016 census, Kiewa had a population of 474.

Facilities include a general store and a state primary school.
