= Cornishtown =

- Town
- Coordinates: 36°6′10″S 146°34′14″E
- Country: Australia
- State: Victoria
- Region: Hume
- LGA: Shire of Indigo

Government
  - State electorate: Benambra
  - Federal division: Indi

Population
  - Total: 94 (2021 census)
- Postcode: 3683

Cornishtown is a locality in the Shire of Indigo, Victoria, Australia. At the 2021 census, Cornishtown had a population of 94.
