= Shire of Indigo =

- Local government area
- Location in Victoria

- Interactive map of Shire of Indigo
- Country: Australia
- State: Victoria
- Region: Hume
- Established: 1994
- Council seat: Beechworth

Government
  - Mayor: Bernard Gaffney
  - State electorate: Benambra
  - Federal division: Indi

Area
  - Total: 2,040 km^{2} (790 sq mi)

Population
  - Total: 17,368 (2021 census)
  - Density: 8.514/km^{2} (22.05/sq mi)
- Gazetted: 18 November 1994
- Website: Shire of Indigo
LGAs around Shire of Indigo
Federation (NSW)	Greater Hume (NSW)	Wodonga
Moira	Shire of Indigo	Towong
Wangaratta	Alpine	Towong

The Shire of Indigo, a local government area (LGA) in the Hume region of Victoria, Australia, lies in the north-east part of the state. It covers an area of 2,040 square kilometres (790 mi^{2}) and in August 2021 had a population of 17,368. It includes the larger towns of Beechworth, Chiltern, Rutherglen, Wahgunyah and Yackandandah, the smaller towns of Barnawartha and Tangambalanga, and surrounding rural areas.

The Shire is governed and administered by the Indigo Shire Council; its seat of local government and administrative centre is located at the council headquarters in Beechworth, it also has service centres located in Chiltern, Rutherglen and Yackandandah. The Shire is named after the Indigo Valley and Indigo Creek, geographical features that meander through the LGA and into the Murray River.

In 2008, the Bankwest Quality of Life Index rated Indigo fifteenth of 590 Australian local government areas.

== History ==
The Shire of Indigo was formed in 1994 from the amalgamation of the Shire of Rutherglen and most of the Shire of Chiltern, Shire of Yackandandah and United Shire of Beechworth.

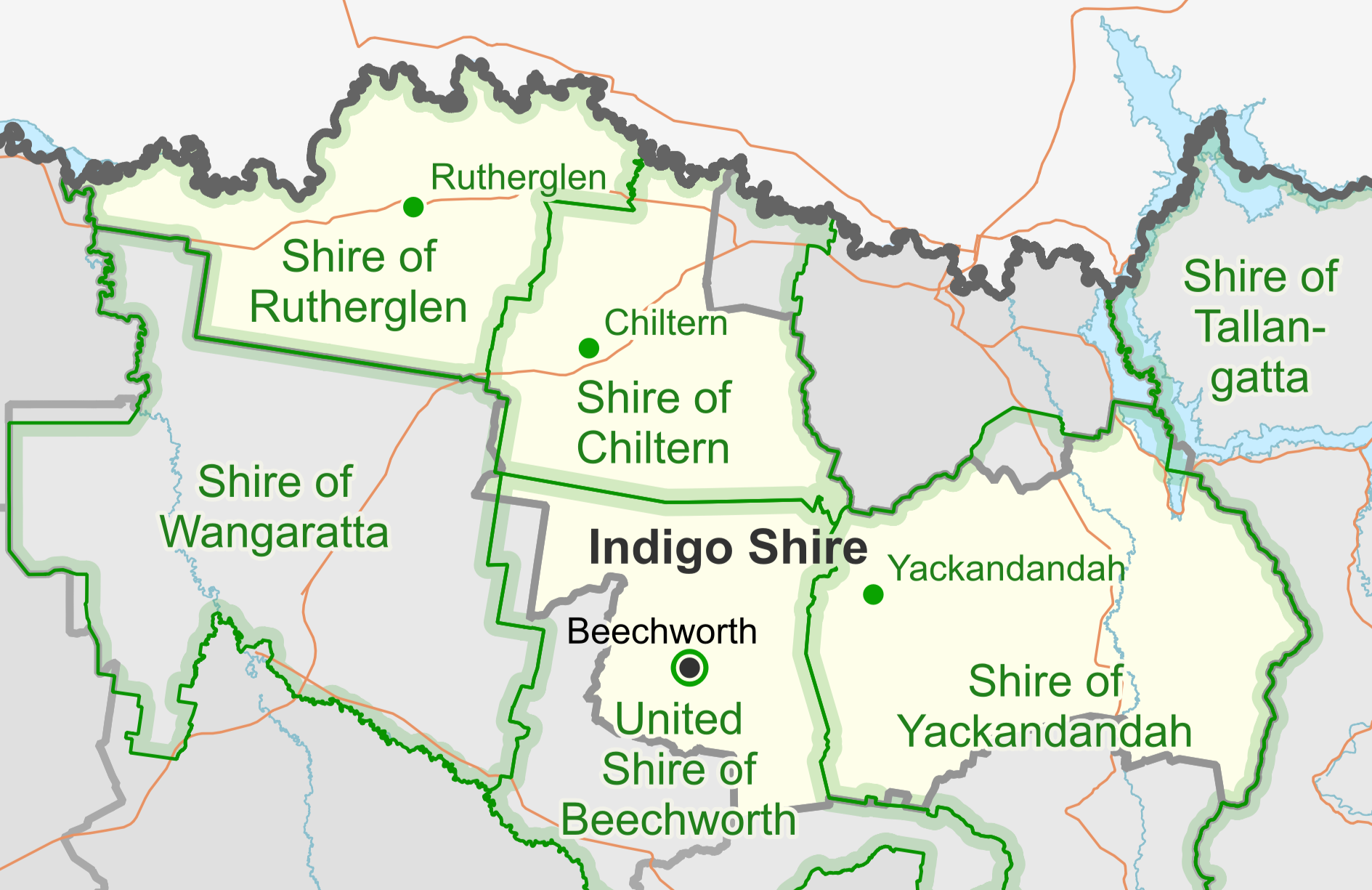
Indigo Shire's predecessor LGAs (green) as they were in 1994. The administrative centres of the former LGAs are marked by green dots.

== Council ==
=== Current composition ===
As of 22 September 2016, the council is composed of seven councillors elected to represent an unsubdivided municipality.

Ward	Councillor	Notes
Unsubdivided	Jenny O'Connor	Mayor, Member of the Greens
Unsubdivided	Sophie Price	Deputy Mayor
Unsubdivided	Bernard Gaffney	
Unsubdivided	James Trenery	
Unsubdivided	Barbara Murdoch	
Unsubdivided	Larry Goldsworthy	
Unsubdivided	Diane Shepheard	

The makeup of the council is as follows:

Party	Councillors
Unaligned	6
Greens	1
Total	7

=== Administration and governance ===
The council meets in the council chambers at the council headquarters in the Beechworth Municipal Offices, which is also the location of the council's administrative activities. It also provides customer services at both its administrative centre in Beechworth, and its service centres in Chiltern, Rutherglen and Yackandandah.

== Townships and localities ==
The 2021 census, the shire had a population of 17,368 up from 15,952 in the 2016 census

Population
Locality	2016	2021
Allans Flat	318	297
Barnawartha	904	987
Beechworth	3,859	4,274
Brimin	171	181
Browns Plains	102	99
Bruarong	77	114
Carlyle	79	82
Charleroi	73	82
Chiltern	1,605	1,580
Chiltern Valley	60	77
Cornishtown	96	94
Gooramadda	58	62
Gundowring^	214	208
Huon^	219	206
Indigo Valley	329	346
Kergunyah	215	232
Kiewa	474	483
Lilliput	76	84
Mudgegonga^	172	184
Norong	118	130
Osbornes Flat	233	285
Rutherglen	2,378	2,579
Sandy Creek	179	200
Staghorn Flat^	293	368
Stanley	364	371
Tangambalanga	542	908
Wahgunyah	1,098	1,061
Wooragee	345	342
Yackandandah	1,811	2,008

^ - Territory divided with another LGA

Baarmutha was a former town in the Shire of Indigo.

== See also ==
- List of localities (Victoria)
