= Barnawartha =

- Town
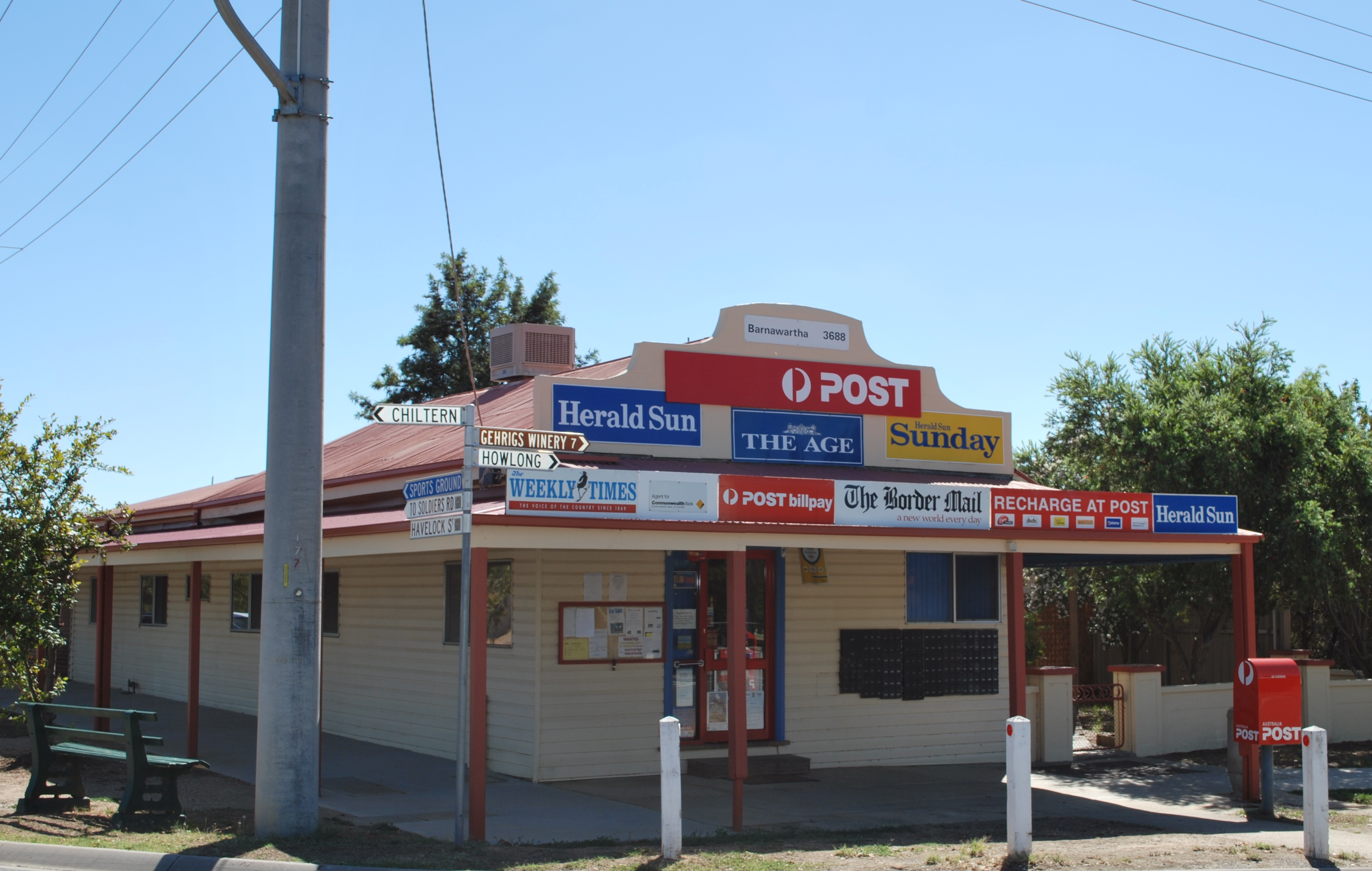
- Post office

- Interactive map of Barnawartha
- Coordinates: 36°06′0″S 146°40′0″E
- Country: Australia
- State: Victoria
- Region: Hume
- LGA: Shire of Indigo
- Location: 299 km (186 mi) NE of Melbourne; 23 km (14 mi) W of Wodonga; 10 km (6.2 mi) NE of Chiltern
- Established: 1860

Government
  - State electorate: Benambra
  - Federal division: Indi
- Elevation: 179 m (587 ft)

Population
  - Total: 987 (2021 census)
- Postcode: 3688

Barnawartha is a small town in north-east Victoria, Australia, located along the Hume Highway approximately 299 kilometres (186 mi) from Melbourne. It lies on the banks of Indigo Creek, a tributary of the Murray River. The town's commercial centre is around High Street.

== Etymology ==
The town was previously known as Indigo Crossing before the current name came into common use during the 1840s. The name is thought to derive from an Aboriginal word, with various recorded meanings including "tall rushes" and "parting of the storms". The town stands on the traditional lands of the Dhudhuroa people.

== History ==
The township was surveyed in 1857 by Assistant Surveyor William Snell Chauncy. It was settled in 1860, and the Post Office opened on 1 August 1860.

A pastoral run along Indigo Creek was first taken up in 1837. A flour mill was constructed in 1860, and a vineyard was established in 1858, which later became Gehrig's Winery in 1867. Though Barnawartha itself was never a gold town, it grew as a service centre for travellers heading to and from the Beechworth goldfields following gold discoveries there in 1852.

About five kilometres east of Barnawartha is Mount Lady Franklin, named after the wife of the Lieutenant Governor of Tasmania, Sir John Franklin. Lady Jane Franklin passed near the site during a journey from Melbourne to Yass in 1839.

Gustav and William Baumgarten were early landowners in the area. After serving time for receiving stolen horses from bushranger Ned Kelly, William established a large winery named Bogong on the Murray River.

In January 1952, a bushfire destroyed ten houses, a shop, an old mill, and the Methodist church.

== Historic resources ==
The town contains several historic buildings, including its post office, general store, Cheesely's Bootmakers shop, and a rebuilt hotel. The former Barnawartha railway station, opened in 1873 and closed in 1985, still has its original platform and building.

About seven kilometres north-west at Barnawartha North is The Hermitage, a homestead built from local granite, constructed by David Reid (1820–1906), one of the first settlers in the Ovens district. Reid married Mary Barber, a niece of explorer Hamilton Hume. The property is listed on both the Victorian and Australian heritage registers.

The Barnawartha Soldiers Memorial Hall was opened on 21 December 1921, built entirely by voluntary subscription to commemorate those from the district who served in World War I. The foundation stone was laid by Senator George Pearce on 9 July 1921. The land was donated free of charge and the building remains community owned and operated.

== Railway incidents ==
Barnawartha has been the site of two significant rail incidents on the North East railway line.

On 17 June 1982, a Melbourne-bound goods train ran through a red signal in heavy fog north of Barnawartha station and collided with the rear of the Spirit of Progress passenger train, which had broken down due to engine failure. The goods train struck at approximately 46 km/h, killing both crew members of the goods train and injuring nine others.

On 29 January 2020, a Pacific National freight train derailed near Barnawartha while travelling toward Albury, separating into three sections. The front section continued until it struck an approaching V/Line passenger train on the adjacent track, which impacted a shipping container on a derailed wagon and stopped approximately 50 metres short of another container lying across both tracks. No injuries were reported. An investigation by Victoria's Office of the Chief Investigator found the derailment was caused by a vertical track geometry defect and probable lateral track misalignment that had not been identified under the Australian Rail Track Corporation's assessment system. The incident led the ARTC to revise its procedures and standards for track geometry assessment.

== Education ==
Barnawartha Primary School, located at 11–17 Stanley Street, provides education from Prep to Year 6. The school is part of the Upper Hume Network and received a new inclusive playground in 2021 via the Victorian Government's Inclusive Schools Fund.

== Sports ==
The former golf course has been repurposed into a general-use recreation reserve managed by the Barnawartha Recreation Reserve Committee of Management.

In early 2024, two multipurpose hard courts (netball and tennis) were completed. Upgrades included LED lighting, seating, shelters, fencing and new acrylic surfaces. The $779,782 project was jointly funded by:

- Victorian Government: $491,982
- Indigo Shire Council: $282,800
- Barnawartha Netball Club: $5,000

In mid‑2025, the oval lighting upgrade was approved to install 100 lux LED floodlights. The project was funded by:

- Victorian Government: $250,000
- Indigo Shire Council: $74,474
- Barnawartha Football Netball Club: $25,000

Barnawartha is also home to the Indigo Creek Fishing Club and various informal recreational spaces.

=== Barnawartha Football Netball Club ===
Barnawartha FC colours

Barnawartha has an Australian rules football and netball team competing in the Tallangatta & District Football League. The club's first recorded match was in 1894 against Gooramadda. The club played informal matches until joining the Ovens and Murray Junior Football Association in 1910, and lost the 1911 grand final to Howlong.

It later played in the Chiltern & District Football Association from 1912 to 1957 (with breaks during wartime) before joining the T&DFL in 1958. Premierships were won in 2002, 2013 and they are the current reigning premiers having defeated Kiewa Sandy Creek in 2026.

== Attractions ==
Nearby is the Chiltern-Mt Pilot National Park, covering 21,565 hectares. The park features the Mt Pilot Range, Woolshed Falls, historic goldfields, and rare flora and fauna including the swift parrot and regent honeyeater.

The area includes Frying Pan Creek, Indigo Creek, Mount Lady Franklin, and bush camping at Richardson's Bend (known locally as "Richo's") on the Murray River, popular for fishing and boating.

The Barnawartha Scenic Reserve is managed by Parks Victoria and offers bushwalking in the surrounding ranges.
