= Gundowring =

- Town
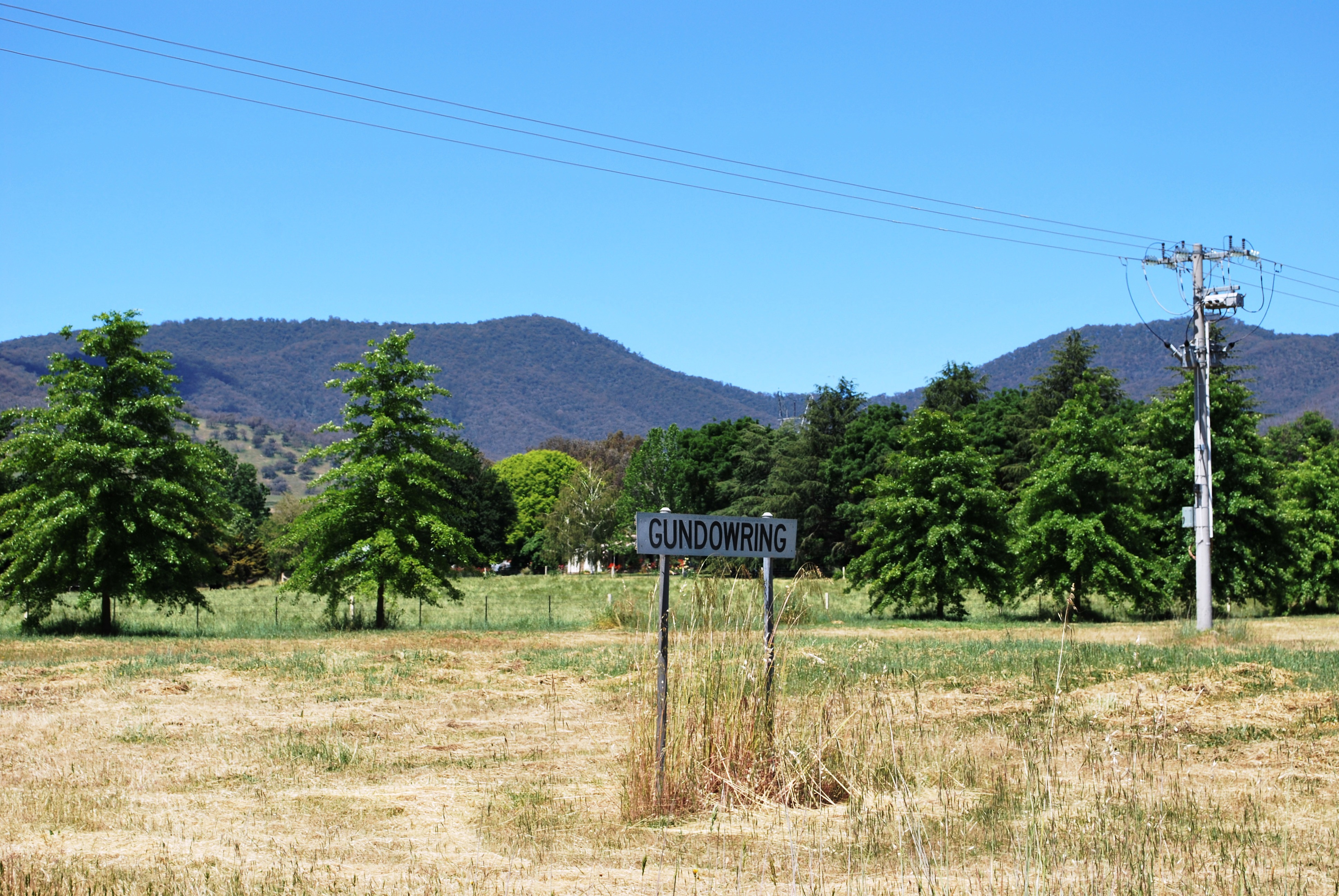
- Entering Gundowring, 2009

- Coordinates: 36°25′23″S 147°03′41″E
- Country: Australia
- State: Victoria
- Region: Hume
- LGAs: Alpine Shire; Shire of Indigo
- Location: 331 km (206 mi) NE of Melbourne; 43 km (27 mi) S of Wodonga; 41 km (25 mi) N of Mount Beauty

Government
  - State electorate: Benambra
  - Federal division: Indi

Population
  - Total: 208 (2021 census)
- Postcode: 3691

Gundowring is a locality in north east Victoria, Australia. The locality is in the Shire of Indigo local government area, 331 kilometres (206 mi) north east of the state capital, Melbourne.

At the 2021 census, Gundowring had a population of 208.

Gundowring Football Club were runners up in the 1902 and 1904 Kiewa Valley Football Association.
