= Stanley, Victoria =

Stanley
- Town
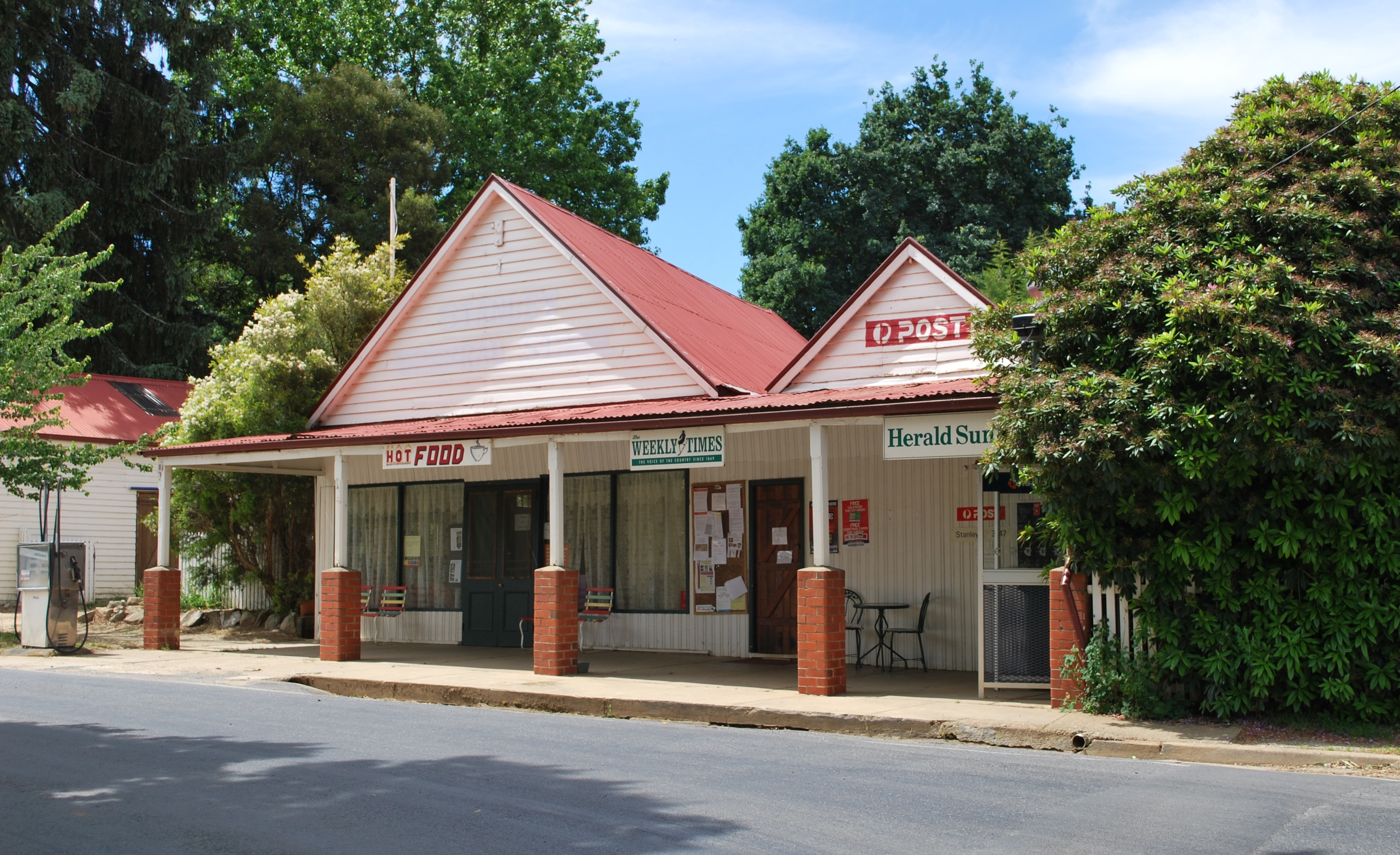
- The now closed general store and post office (circa 1852)

- Interactive map of Stanley
- Coordinates: 36°24′0″S 146°46′0″E
- Country: Australia
- State: Victoria
- Region: Hume
- LGA: Shire of Indigo
- Location: 296 km (184 mi) NE of Melbourne; 49 km (30 mi) E of Wangaratta; 12 km (7.5 mi) SE of Beechworth

Government
  - State electorate: Benambra
  - Federal division: Indi
- Elevation: 800 m (2,600 ft)

Population
  - Total: 324 (2006 census)
- Postcode: 3747

Stanley is a small town approximately 9 kilometres (5.6 mi) from Beechworth in Victoria, Australia, noted for its apple and nut farms. At the 2011 census, Stanley had a population of 324.

The town was formerly known as Snake Gully and Nine Mile Creek. Many parts of this rural community have the remains of gold diggings from the Victorian gold rush of the mid-1800s.

== Gold rush era ==
The district has an important historic gold mining past and produced some colourful people during that heyday. Among them was John Scarlett (1824-?), a Scottish miner. Scarlett was involved in all things associated with writing to the newspapers, calling meetings and voicing his opinions. Originally a dry miner, he advocated rights for this type of operator, then on acquiring access to water he became an advocate for wet miners to the exclusion of the dry operators. He stood for mining board elections and then Victorian parliament in 1859. He appears in two historical works of the district: Woods, Beechworth and more so in O'Brien, Shenanigans. Scarlett eventually became the Secretary for the local roads board. No known photo of him exists. In her book, Carole Woods termed Scarlett the "Nine Mile Warrior". O'Brien's work with the local 1850s papers uncovered an advertisement against Scarlett and much doggerel verse: a local paper christened Scarlett a "water squatter".

During the gold era, the Stanley region comprised a higher proportion of miners from Scotland, in comparison to other localities in the surrounding area (O'Brien). The gold mining carried out in the district involved (wet) sluicing operations.

Like many goldfields in northeastern Victoria there was a Chinese presence at Stanley.

== Stanley today ==
The town centre includes the Old Store Cafe (Closed), Stanley Pub, Primary School (currently not used as a school), CFA Fire Shed, Uniting Church, Recreational Reserve, Town Hall and Athenaeum (library). A store was built by Syd Mathieson (circa 1852). The Post Office was officially recognised and opened on 1 October 1857 as Nine Mile Creek and was renamed Stanley the next year, but ceased trading in 2010. Stanley Primary School closed in 2012.

There remain only two of the original buildings in Stanley, they being the store and powder magazine at the rear and the old police lock-up on Collins Road.

The Indigo Shire planning scheme notes that the lack of a reticulated sewerage system in Stanley has contributed towards water pollution in the area, and resolves that the area is "unsuitable for further un-sewered urban development". It accordingly resolves to "restrict future development until such time as a reticulated sewerage system is developed."
