= Chiltern, Victoria =

Chiltern
- Town
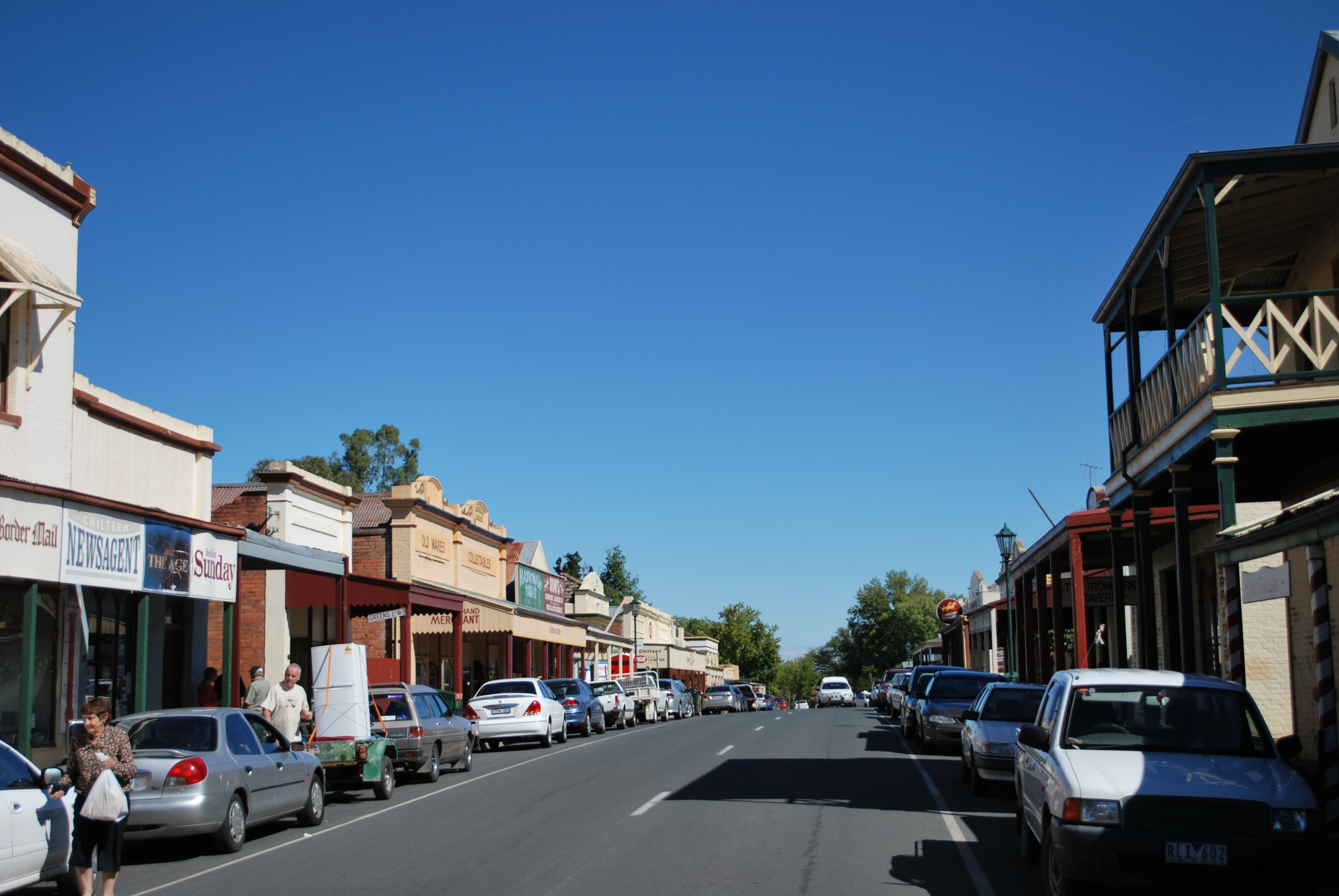
- Main street

- Interactive map of Chiltern
- Coordinates: 36°09′0″S 146°36′0″E
- Country: Australia
- State: Victoria
- Region: Hume
- LGA: Shire of Indigo
- Location: 281 km (175 mi) from Melbourne; 34 km (21 mi) from Wodonga; 25 km (16 mi) from Beechworth

Government
  - State electorate: Benambra
  - Federal division: Indi
- Elevation: 209 m (686 ft)

Population
  - Total: 1,580 (2021 census)
- Postcode: 3683

Chiltern is a town in Victoria, Australia, in the northeast of the state between Wangaratta and Wodonga, in the Shire of Indigo. At the 2021 census, Chiltern had a population of 1,580. It is the birthplace of Prime Minister John McEwen. The town is close to the Chiltern-Mount Pilot National Park. Chiltern was once on the main road between Melbourne and Sydney but is now bypassed by the Hume Freeway running one kilometre to the south.

== History ==
The area around Chiltern is the traditional lands of the Dhudhuroa people. The nearby Yeddonba Aboriginal Cultural Site, in the Chiltern-Mt Pilot National Park, includes artworks created by the original inhabitants of the Chiltern area, including one ochre painting thought to represent a Thylacine, an animal now extinct and which has been extinct on mainland Australia for thousands of years.

The area of Chiltern was on the Wahgunyah cattle run and was known as Black Dog Creek. The township, named after the Chiltern Hills in England, was surveyed in 1853 but not established until gold discoveries in 1858-59 during the greater Victorian Gold Rush period. The Post Office opened on 1 September 1859.

The Chiltern Magistrates' Court closed on 1 January 1983, not having been visited by a Magistrate since 1972.

Many of Chiltern's buildings are classified by the National Trust. In 1859, many shop-keepers and miners from around Beechworth and the Ovens Valley districts followed the rush and re-located into Chiltern.

The Grape Vine Hotel, on the corners of Main Street and Conness Street, boasts the largest grapevine in Australia, planted in 1867.

=== Gold ===
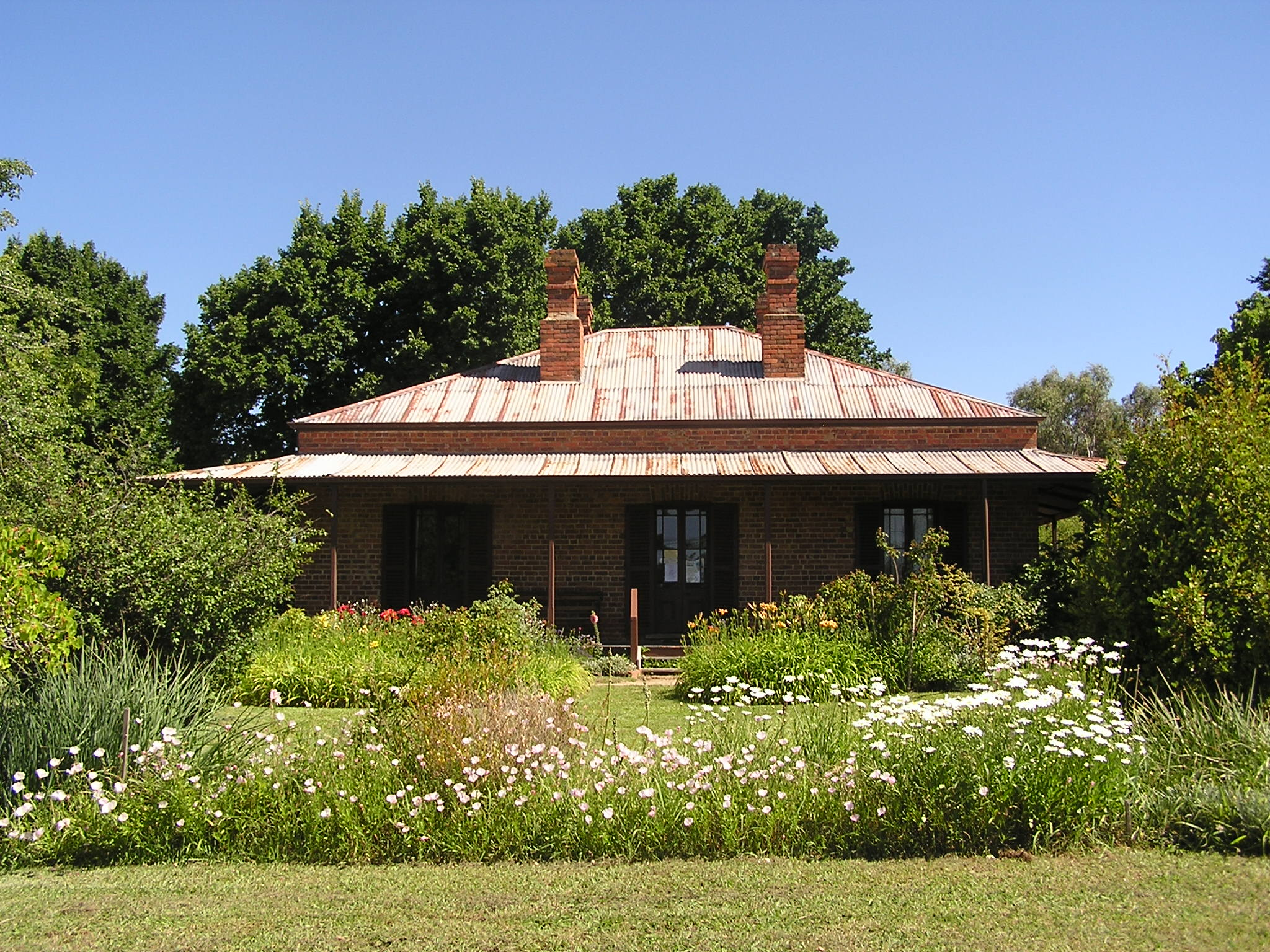
Lake View House at Chiltern, the home of author Henry Handel Richardson from July 1876 for 1½ years. Her early years at Chiltern featured in the novel The Fortunes of Richard Mahony.

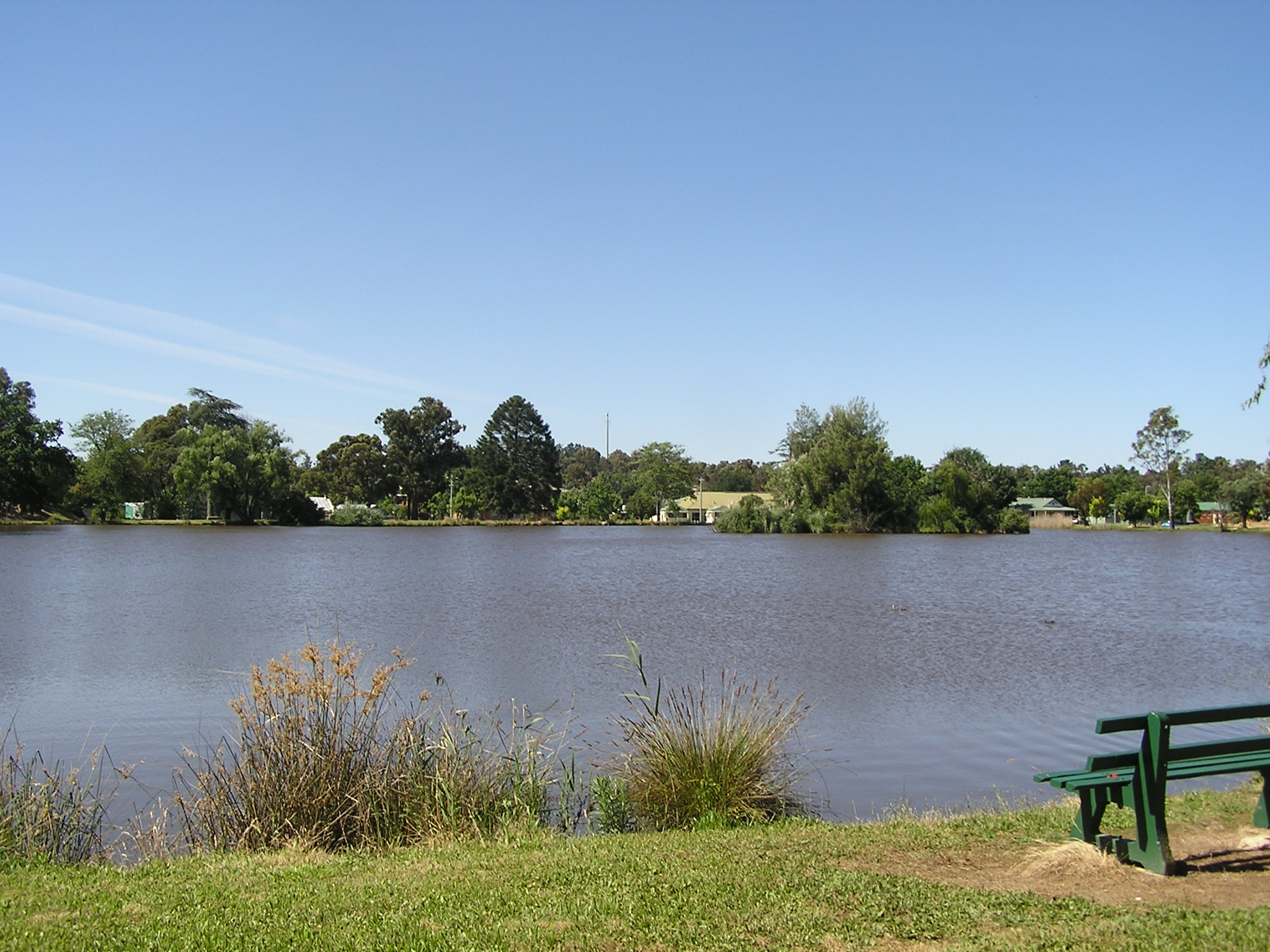
View of the lake from Lake View House. It was a swamp, not a lake, at the time the Richardson family lived in Chiltern.

The discovery of gold by John Conness in late 1858 and early 1859, brought a huge shift in population into the Chiltern – Black Dog Creek area. Gold discoveries drew many miners away from the nearby Ovens goldfields; namely Beechworth, Nine Mile Creek and Stanley during the big drought of 1859. Unlike those surface-based sluicing mining operations around Beechworth, the gold around Chiltern was extracted by sinking deep wet leads. These operations required a different type of miner and working groups, capable of sinking shafts to some 400 feet in depth. Miners with these skills and abilities came into the area, from Ballarat and Bendigo and joined with the sluicers from around Beechworth and the Ovens. Miners from the Ballarat goldfields were considered 'radical', because of their connections with the Eureka Rebellion (1854). Some of these miners were colourful characters and the most notable, a colourful and radical A.A. O'Connor, stood for parliament in 1859 as the would-be member for the Ovens; his escapades and the social tensions his candidature aroused appear in O'Brien's book which is cited below.

While Beechworth's gold production declined during 1859, due in part to the drought and lack of water for sluicing, Chiltern's gold production increased (O'Brien), to such an extent that Chiltern looked as if it would usurp the importance of Beechworth. Beechworth was the most important regional centre in North-eastern Victoria during the gold boom of 1852–1859. Chiltern did overshadow Beechworth within a few years, especially when the main Melbourne-Albury rail by-passed Beechworth. Finally, when the gold dwindled during the early 1900s, so did Chiltern.

== The town today ==
The town hosts an antique fair in August and an art show in June. The Chiltern-Mount Pilot National Park lies close to the town.

Golfers play at the Chiltern Golf Club on Howlong Road.

The winning clip of the 2009 J Award for Best Music Video of the Year, Alex Roberts' video for Art vs. Science's "Parlez-vous Français?", was entirely shot in this town.

Several movies have been shot using Chiltern's well-preserved Victorian-era streetscapes, including Walt Disney's Ride a Wild Pony.

== Transport ==
The railway station on the North East railway line, has V/Line services running between Melbourne and Albury.

== Facilities ==
=== Health and aged care ===
Chiltern Bush & District Bush Nursing Hospital officially opened on 4 October 1959, containing with six beds, a modern operating theatre and nursery. Over the years, the number of beds increased, and the facility developed into Chiltern & District Health Service.

Around 1987, Helen Haines, who later became a federal member of parliament for the division of Indi in 2019, was appointed matron of the hospital at the age of 26. In 2006 the hospital closed its wards, continuing to operate as a provider of some community-based services for some years, until it was amalgamated with Glenview Community Care (which began as Rutherglen Bush Nursing Hospital in Rutherglen), later evolving into Glenview Health. In July 2008 Glenview Community Care merged with Chiltern & District Health Service to form Indigo North Health Inc (INH), maintaining campuses at Rutherglen and Chiltern.

After closing, it became a GP clinic until June 2017, when it began being for allied health services including physiotherapy, podiatry and occupational therapy. These were funded by Indigo North Health, who owned the building, and hoped that the Victorian Government would pick up the tab for the services after 30 June 2018. A steering group of 20 participants was formed in early 2018 to decide the future of the building, which was in poor condition. The services were running at a loss, and Indigo North were considering selling the building.

In June 2025 Indigo North Health was renamed Glenview Health and moved to a new facility, operating Glenview Health Residential Aged Care over two campuses.

== Chiltern Football Club ==
Chiltern played its first game of Australian rules football against Beechworth in 1876.

Chiltern has four Australian Rules football teams & four netball teams that competes in the Tallangatta & District Football League.

Chiltern FC have played in the following official football competitions -

- 1893 to 1903 - Ovens & Murray Football League
- 1904 - North East Central Football Association
- 1905 - Half Day Holiday Football Association
- 1906 to 1908 - Ovens & Murray Football League
- 1909 - Federal Junior Football Association
- 1910 - Ovens & Murray Junior Football Association
- 1911 - Rutherglen & District Football Association
- 1912 to 1916 - Chiltern & District Football Association
- 1917 & 1918 - Chiltern FC in recess, due to World War I
- 1919 to 1940 - Chiltern & District Football Association
- 1941 to 1944 - Chiltern FC in recess, due to World War II
- 1945 to 1953 - Chiltern & District Football Association
- 1954 to 2002 - Ovens & King Football League
- 2003 to present day - Tallangatta & District Football League

Football Premierships
Seniors

- Chiltern & District Football Association
  - 1914, 1922, 1929, 1936, 1940, 1945, 1947, 1948, 1949, 1950, 1951, 1953 (12 total)
- Ovens & King Football League
  - 1957, 1958, 1968, 1971, 1972, 1982, 1983, 1994, 1996, 1998 (10 total)
- Tallangatta & District Football League
  - 2022, 2023

== Notable people ==
- Mary Gaunt, novelist, was born here on 21 February 1861.
- Cecil Robert Gaunt, army officer and brother of Mary Eliza Gaunt, was born here in 1863
- Henry Handel Richardson, novelist (The Getting of Wisdom), lived in Chiltern for some time in her youth.
- John McEwen, 18th Prime Minister of Australia, was born in Chiltern on 29 March 1900.
- Barrie Cassidy, former Border Morning Mail and ABC journalist, grew up in Chiltern.
- Nigel Lappin and cousin, Matthew Lappin, former professional Australian rules footballers, grew up in Chiltern.
