= Tangambalanga =

- Town
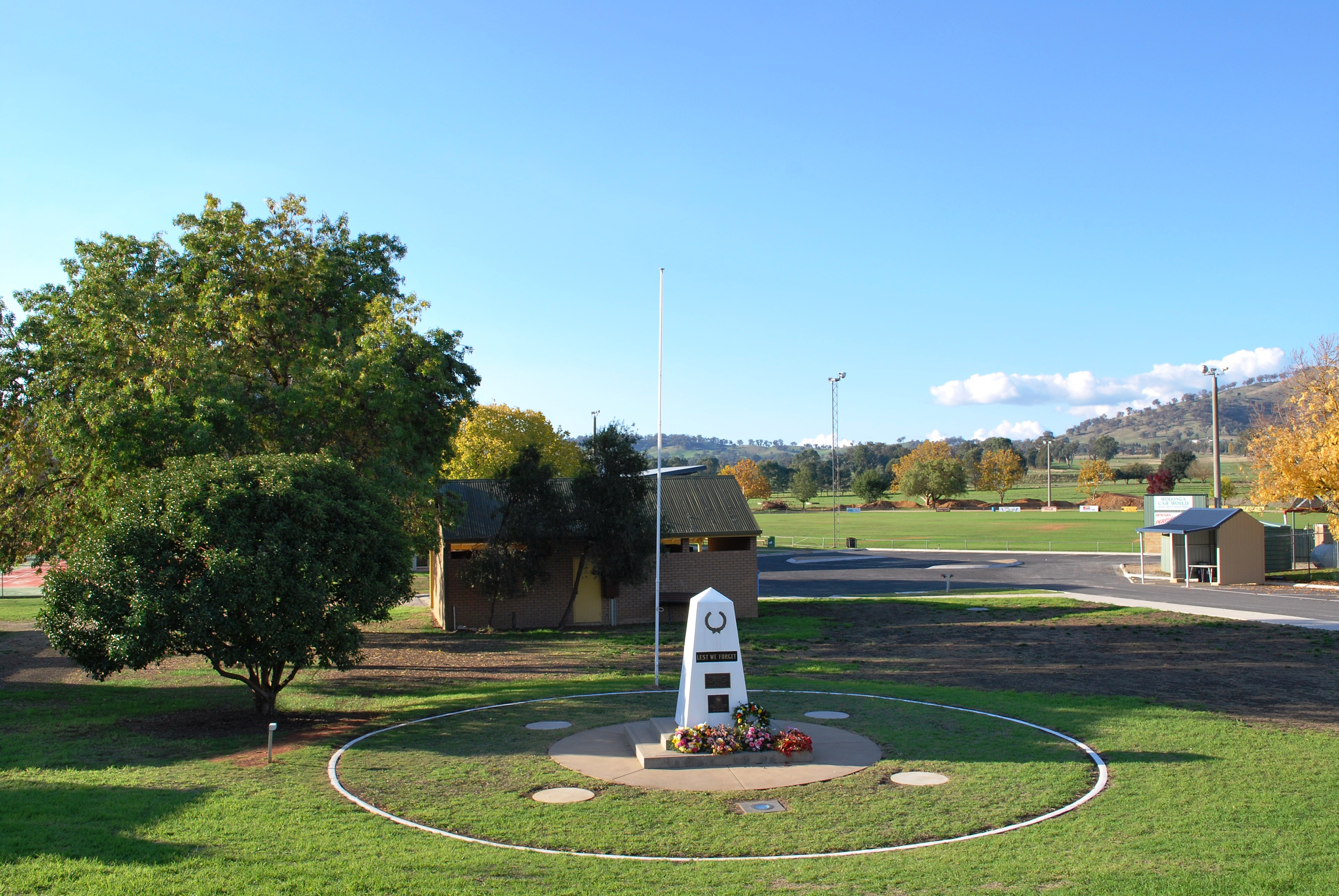
- War memorial with the football ground in the background

- Interactive map of Tangambalanga
- Coordinates: 36°14′0″S 147°02′0″E
- Country: Australia
- State: Victoria
- Region: Hume
- LGA: Shire of Indigo
- Location: 345 km (214 mi) NE of Melbourne; 23 km (14 mi) SE of Wodonga; 18 km (11 mi) W of Tallangatta

Government
  - State electorate: Benambra
  - Federal division: Indi

Population
  - Total: 908 (2021 census)
- Postcode: 3691

Tangambalanga (/ˌtæŋəmbəˈlæŋə/ TANG-əm-bəl-ANG-ə), also known as Tangam, is a town in the Shire of Indigo, Victoria, Australia. Tangambalanga is located approximately 20 kilometres (12 mi) south-east of the city of Wodonga, and 5 kilometres (3.1 mi) from the Hume Weir. At the 2021 census, Tangambalanga had a population of 908.

== History ==
The town's name is derived from an Aboriginal word for the white clawed lobster, Murray crayfish. The Town was the site for an Aboriginal reserve, gazetted as such in 1862, with local landowner, Thomas Mitchell, acting as the local "Protector of Aborigines".

The Post Office opened on 1 December 1911.

== Economy ==
Situated in a valley, the town exists around the dairy and cheese factory of the Murray Goulburn Co-operative, which processes milk for the fresh milk market, as well as butter and cheese. The closure of the factory was announced in May 2017.

The town also contains a child care centre, kindergarten, swimming pool, football and cricket fields, vet clinic, mechanic, the Kiewa Valley Primary School, two general stores, a pharmacy and a pub.
