= Yackandandah =

- Town
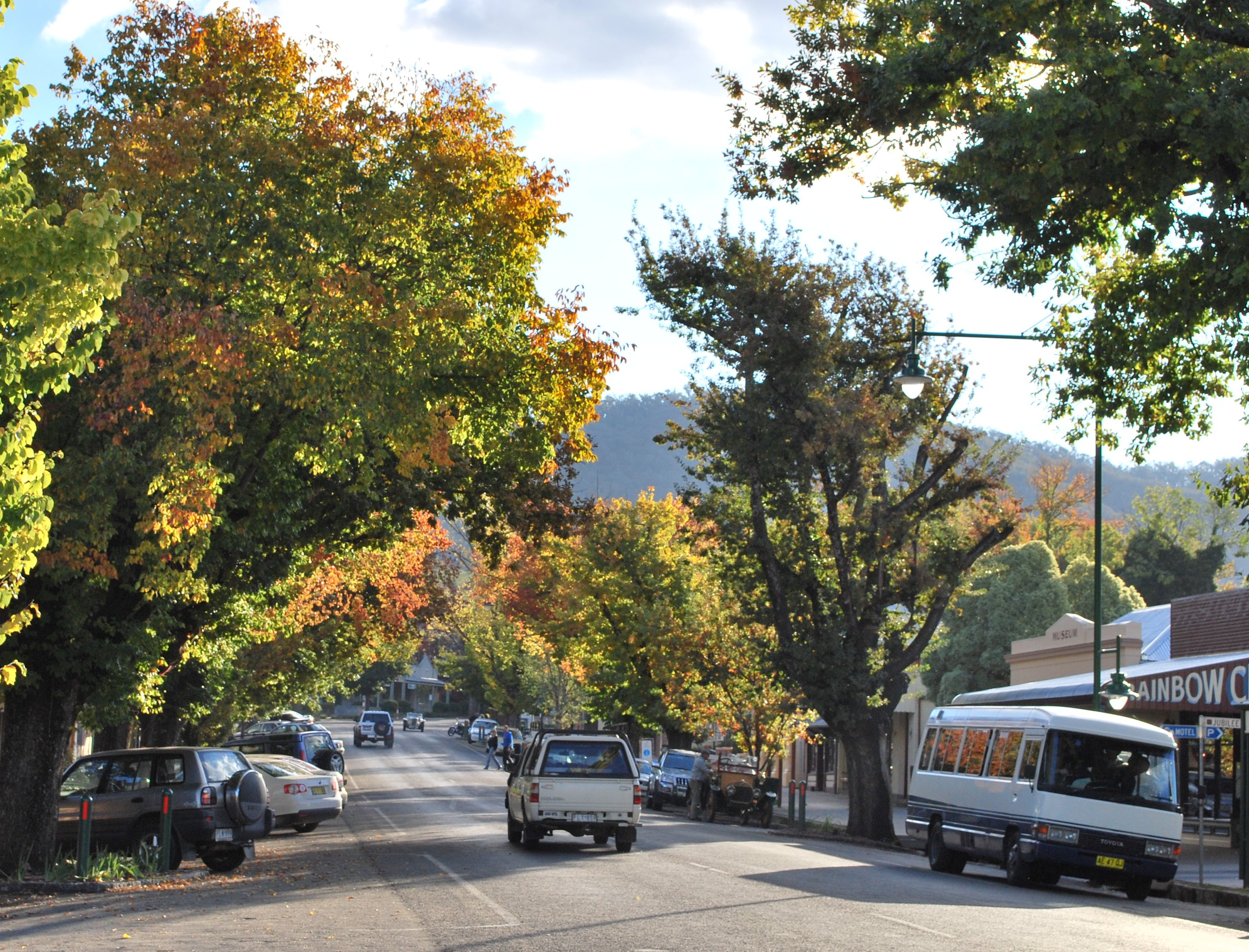
- High Street, recorded on the Register of the National Estate

- Interactive map of Yackandandah
- Coordinates: 36°18′47″S 146°50′21″E
- Country: Australia
- State: Victoria
- Region: Hume
- LGA: Shire of Indigo
- Location: 313 km (194 mi) NE of Melbourne; 28 km (17 mi) S of Wodonga; 22 km (14 mi) E of Beechworth

Government
  - State electorate: Benambra
  - Federal division: Indi

Population
  - Total: 2,008 (2021 census)
- Postcode: 3749

Yackandandah /ˈjækənˌdændə/ is a town in northeast Victoria, Australia. It is near the regional cities of Wodonga and Albury, and is close to the town of Beechworth. At the 2021 census, the town had a population of 1,113, while the broader Yackandandah locality had a population of 2,008.

== History ==
The indigenous people of the area prior to white colonisation were the Dhudhuroa people, in whose language the toponym Yackandandah is said to have meant “one boulder on top of another at the junction of two creeks”, namely the Yackandandah and Commissioner creeks' intersection.

The area was first opened to white settlement when Irish-born James Osborne took up land at Osborne's Flat in 1837. On the discovery of gold deposits on its territory in 1852, it became a gold mining centre known for its alluvial wet mining techniques. Like all such goldfields this included Chinese gold miners, several of whose gravestones can be found in Yackandandah Cemetery. Yackandandah Post Office opened on 13 June 1856. Another office nearby, Yackandandah Junction, opened in 1872 but closed in 1885.

In his local book, Antony O'Brien (p. 22) quotes an old poem published in the Melbourne Punch, 11 June 1857, titled, "The Lass of Yackandandah".

Let poets sing of English girls,
Their beauty and their candor;
Give me a sweeter nymph than all, –
The lass of Yackandandah."

"She draws a cork with such an air,
No mortal can withstand her;
She turns a tap, and turns our heads, –
The lass of Yackandandah.

— O'Brien, The Lass of Yackandandah – a goldfield beauty

== Today ==
The area is now predominantly a dairy farming and forestry region and has numerous bed and breakfast lodges which offer access for its many visitors to the district's forest and mountains. It is close to achieving self-sufficiency in energy supply, foreseen to be reached by 2024, based on solar power.

The town is affectionately known as "Yack".

The commercial centre of the town, known as the Yackandandah Conservation Area, is recorded on the Register of the National Estate.

== Rail ==
The Yackandandah railway line once linked Yackandandah to Beechworth and opened in 1891. The route to Woorragee and from there to Yackandandah was steep; trains descending the last gradient into Yackandandah would halt (near the now Yackandandah turnoff, from the Beechworth-Wodonga Road) so the guard could apply hand-brakes to carriages and wagons. The last train on the Yackandandah-Beechworth line was in July 1954. Though the line was torn up, many sections of the original right of way are visible from the roadway between Beechworth and Yackandandah. In May 2017 the Victoria State Government budgeted for an extension of the Murray to Mountains Rail Trail side branch from Beechworth to Yackandandah. The side branch currently extends from Beechworth to Everton Station, where it connects to the main trail.

== Culture ==
Used for the filming of the 2003 film Strange Bedfellows (starring Michael Caton and Paul Hogan). Yackandandah is home to the annual Yackandandah Folk Festival attracting local, Australian and international artists since 1998. Like the larger neighbouring town of Beechworth, Yackandandah promotes itself as a tourist destination on the basis of its gold mining history and features a period streetscape as well as an increasing number of antique shops.

Two historic buildings, the 146-year-old museum (formerly the Bank of Victoria) and an adjacent timber store ("Rainbow Crystal"), were destroyed by a fire in the early morning of 21 December 2006. A real estate agency was also severely damaged. The museum was rebuilt, reopening in November 2008.

== Sports and recreation ==
Golfers play at the course of the Yackandandah Golf Club on Racecourse Road.

The Yackandandah Cricket Club play in both junior and senior grades in the Cricket Albury Wodonga competition.

=== Yackandandah Football / Netball Club ===
The town has had an active Australian rules football team since its first club meeting in 1881.

The club has competed in the Tallangatta & District Football League, since 1957, winning senior football premierships in 1964 and 2000.

- Football Timeline
  - 1897 - Weiss Trophy
  - 1904 - 1905: Kiewa Valley Football Association
  - 1906 - Murphy's Albion Hotel Football Competition
  - 1907 - 1911: ?
  - 1912 - Yackandandah & District Football Association
  - 1913 - 1915: Club active, but did no play in an official competition.
  - 1916 - 1923: Club in recess
  - 1924 - 1927: Kiewa & District Football Association
  - 1928 - 1932: Yackandandah & District Football Association
  - 1933 - 1935: Chiltern & District Football Association
  - 1936 - 1939: Dederang & District Football Association
  - 1940 - Yackandandah & District Football League
  - 1941 - 1944: Club in recess. WW2
  - 1945 - Club reformed and played several non competition matches.
  - 1946 - 1953: Yackandandah & District Football League
  - 1954 - Chiltern & District Football Association
  - 1955 - ?
  - 1956 - Chiltern & District Football Association
  - 1957 - 2024: Tallangatta & District Football League

Football Premierships

- Kiewa & District Football Association
  - 1904 - Yackandandah: 6.7 - 43 d Gundowring: 3.14 - 32
- Murphy's Albion Hotel Football Association
  - 1906 - Yackandandah: 7.6 - 48 d Sandy Creek: 4.10 - 34
- Yackandandah & District Football League (1928 - 1932, 1940, 1946 - 1953)
  - 1928 - Yackandandah: 7.16 - 58 defeated Kergunyah: 8.3 - 51
  - 1940 - Yackandandah: 13.12 - 90 defeated Mudgegonga: 5.9 - 39
- Tallangatta & District Football League
  - Seniors
    - 1964 - Yackandandah defeated Mitta United
    - 2000 - Yackandandah defeated Barnawartha
    - 2024 - Yackandandah: 10.11 - 71 defeated Chiltern: 7.5 - 47

League Best & Fairest Awards

Senior Football

- Tallangatta & District Football League
  - 1964 - Hugh Earnshaw: Tied with the winner on 26 votes, but finished as runner up on the old countback system, but has never received a retrospective medal from the T&DFNL.
  - 1972 - John Lease
  - 1991 - Jay McNeil
  - 1997 & 1998 - Travis Tyler
  - 2001 & 2004 - Simom Corr
  - 2002 - Des Anthony
  - 2006 - Aaron Purcell
  - 2017 - Lee Dale
  - 2024 - Zac Leitch

== Notable people ==
- Sir Isaac Isaacs, Governor General of Australia, who though born in Melbourne spent most of his early years in Yackandandah.
- Peter Denahy, Australian entertainer.
