= Electoral district of Benambra =

State electoral district of Victoria, Australia

Benambra Victoria—Legislative Assembly
- Interactive map of electoral district boundaries from the 2022 state election
- State: Victoria
- Created: 1877
- MP: Bill Tilley
- Party: Liberal Party
- Namesake: Town of Benambra
- Electors: 50,045 (2022)
- Area: 9,147 km^{2} (3,531.7 sq mi)
- Demographic: Rural
- Coordinates: 36°17′S 147°17′E
Electorates around Benambra:
New South Wales	New South Wales	New South Wales
Oven Valley	Benambra	New South Wales
Ovens Valley	Gippsland East	New South Wales

The electoral district of Benambra is one of the electoral districts of Victoria, Australia, for the Victorian Legislative Assembly. It covers an area of 10,037 square kilometres (3,875 sq mi) in north-eastern Victoria. The largest settlement is the city of Wodonga. Benambra also includes the towns of Baranduda, Barnawartha, Beechworth, Chiltern, Corryong, Eskdale, Kiewa, Mitta Mitta, Mount Beauty, Rutherglen, Tallangatta, Tangambalanga, Tawonga, Wahgunyah, and Yackandandah. It lies in the Northern Victoria Region of the upper house, the Legislative Council.

The district of Benambra was created by the Electoral Act Amendment Act 1876. taking effect at the 1877 elections.

The district has been held by various conservative parties unbroken since 1877, with the Liberal Party taking the seat from the Nationals in 1976 and retaining it since.

The district is named after Benambra, a small town 28km north of Omeo in Gippsland. The town of Benambra is not actually located in the electoral district (it is in Gippsland East). Benambra is thought to be Aboriginal in origin meaning hills with big trees or men spearing eels.

== Members for Benambra ==
Member	Party	Term
Peter Wright	Liberal	1877–1880
Peter Wallace	Conservative	1880–1886
Peter Wright	Liberal	1886–1889
Albert Craven	Conservative	1889–1913
Albert Craven	Conservative Liberal	1889–1913
Albert Craven	Commonwealth Liberal	1889–1913
John Leckie	Commonwealth Liberal	1913–1917
Henry Beardmore	Economy	1917–1918
Henry Beardmore	Nationalist	1917–1931
Henry Beardmore	United Australia	1931–1932
Roy Paton	Country	1932–1947
Tom Mitchell	Country	1947–1976
Tom Mitchell	National	1947–1976
Lou Lieberman	Liberal	1976–1992
Tony Plowman	Liberal	1992–2006
Bill Tilley	Liberal	2006–present

== Election results ==
2022 Victorian state election: Benambra
Party	Candidate	Votes	%	±%
Liberal	Bill Tilley	17,658	42.9	+2.8
Independent	Jacqui Hawkins	13,038	31.7	+15.6
Labor	Mark Tait	5,375	13.1	−4.6
Greens	Luke Brady	1,592	3.9	+0.4
Animal Justice	Mike Fuery	1,170	2.8	+2.8
Family First	Janelle Stratton	815	2.0	+2.0
Liberal Democrats	Dean Rossiter	804	2.0	+2.0
Freedom	Adrian James O'Brien	683	1.7	+1.7
Total formal votes		41,135	95.1	+0.5
Informal votes		2,099	4.9	−0.5
Turnout		43,234	86.4	+0.5
Notional two-party-preferred count
Liberal	Bill Tilley	26,021	63.3	+4.0
Labor	Mark Tait	15,114	36.7	−4.0
Two-candidate-preferred result
Liberal	Bill Tilley	20,956	50.9	−1.6
Independent	Jacqui Hawkins	20,179	49.1	+1.6
Liberal hold		Swing	−1.6	
