= Thomas Lockyer =

Thomas or Tom Lockyer may refer to:

- Tom Lockyer (born 1994), Welsh footballer
- Tom Lockyer (cricketer) (1826–1869), English cricketer
- Thomas Lockyer (MP) (1699–1785), English politician
- Thomas Lockyer (actor) in The Commander (TV series) etc.

== See also ==
- Thomas Lockyer Jefferson (1856 – 1932), an American film and stage actor
- Thomas Lockyer Bright (1818 – 1874), invariably referred to as T. L. Bright, was a journalist in Australia
