= Edward Sugden =

Edward Sugden may refer to:

- Edward Sugden (Methodist) (1854–1935), Methodist minister, first master of Queen's College, University of Melbourne
- Edward Sugden, 1st Baron St Leonards (1781–1875), English jurist and Conservative politician.
