= Syd Thom =

Australian rules footballer

Personal information
- Full name: Sydney Claude Thom
- Born: 16 March 1889; North Melbourne, Victoria
- Died: 11 September 1964 (aged 75); Beechworth, Victoria
- Original team: North Melbourne Juniors

Playing career^{1}
Years	Club	Games (Goals)
1910	St Kilda	2 (0)
- ^{1} Playing statistics correct to the end of 1910.

Sydney Claude Thom (16 March 1889 – 11 September 1964) was an Australian rules footballer who played with St Kilda in the Victorian Football League (VFL).
