= Melbourne Shakespeare Society =

The Melbourne Shakespeare Society was founded in Melbourne, Australia, in 1884 at the suggestion of Edward Ellis Morris who was president from 1884 to 1888. Other original members included: William Ievers, James Smith, James Edward Neild (president in 1890).

Past presidents of the society include:

- Edward Ellis Morris 1884–1888
- James Edward Neild 1890
- John Purves Wilson 1901–1903
- Alfred Hart
- Arthur Way
- Edward Sugden 1908
- Morris Mondle Phillips
- Philip David Phillips
- Archibald Thomas Strong 1913
- Edward Sugden 1914–1915
- Ernest Henry Clark Oliphant 1919–1921
- William Alexander Osborne
- Edward Stevens
