= Beechworth Bakery =

Australian bakery chain

- Industry: Bakery retail
- Founded: Beechworth, Victoria, Australia (1984)
- Founder: Tom O'Toole
- Headquarters: Beechworth, Victoria, Australia
- Number of locations: 8 bakery shops (2018); Beechworth; Echuca; Albury; Healesville; Bendigo; Ballarat; Bright; Yackandandah
- Area served: Victoria / New South Wales / Australia / International shipping
- Key people: Tom O'Toole (Founder); Marty Matassoni (Managing Director)
- Products: Full ranges of bakery goods. Bakery Meals; Hot & Cold Drinks; Cake, Slices & Biscuits; Large Cakes; Coach Group Meal Deals
- Services: School groups, social events, parties, baking demonstrations
- Revenue: US$12,000,000 (2010), ▲5% from 2009
- Owner: Tom O'Toole: Founder / Marty Matassoni: Owner & CEO
- Number of employees: 270+ (2018)
- Website: beechworthbakery.com.au

Beechworth Bakery is a company owned chain of bakeries located in destination towns in regional Victoria and NSW. Beechworth is located in Northeast Victoria, Australia, 290 kilometres (180 mi) north of Melbourne and 40 kilometres (25 mi) from the twin cities of Albury and Wodonga which are situated either side of the Victoria – New South Wales border.

Beechworth Bakery was established by Tom O'Toole in 1984 when he bought the Ideal Café and turned it into a bakery. It has since expanded to have outlets in eight other towns in country Victoria and one just over the border in New South Wales – Ballarat, Bendigo, Echuca, Healesville, Albury, Yackandandah and Bright.

== Staff training ==
The Beechworth Bakery uses a technique of training for their employees that is a combination of on-the-job training as well as classroom training. The bakery at times will send their staff away to learn in a practical environment without interruptions with the use of outside companies to train staff in specific skills, including customer service, communications, management skills, computers and much more. Beechworth Bakery has been asked about the added cost of training for employees and if in fact it pays in the long run. Their answer is: "A well-trained employee who might leave some day is better than an untrained employee who might stay." Their goal is to have all customers leave with a smile on their face. To maintain this high standard, training for all staff members is provided to meet the Beechworth Bakery Customer Service Standard, which is provided by Productivity Increase Group through their seminars and quality control classes. Beechworth Bakery's vision of customer service and satisfaction is based on three rules. "Rule 1: Take care of the customer. Rule 2: Take care of the customer. Rule 3: Take care of the customer."

== Community involvement ==
A collaboration between Beechworth Bakery and the Learning Disabilities/ Dyslexia project run by Dr Everarda Cunningham at Swinburne University's Lilydale campus saw the creation of an award to recognize achievements of individuals with learning disabilities. This project has developed innovative ways of assisting students who are experiencing learning disabilities through teacher programs designed to provide practical support in the classroom.

In 2014, a multi-day bike ride in support of fundraising for the State Emergency Service (SES) was sponsored by the Beechworth Bakery, with most stages starting and finishing at its outlets.
