= Edward Ellis Morris =

British historian and lexicographer

- Born: 25 December 1843; Madras, British India
- Died: 1 January 1902 (aged 58); England
- Education: Lincoln College, Oxford
- Occupations: Historian, lexicographer, headmaster
- Spouse: Edith Sarah Catherine
- Writing career
- Language: English
- Genres: History, lexicography
- Notable work: Austral English

Edward Ellis Morris (25 December 1843 – 1 January 1902) was an English educationist and miscellaneous writer and latterly in colonial Australia.

== Biography ==
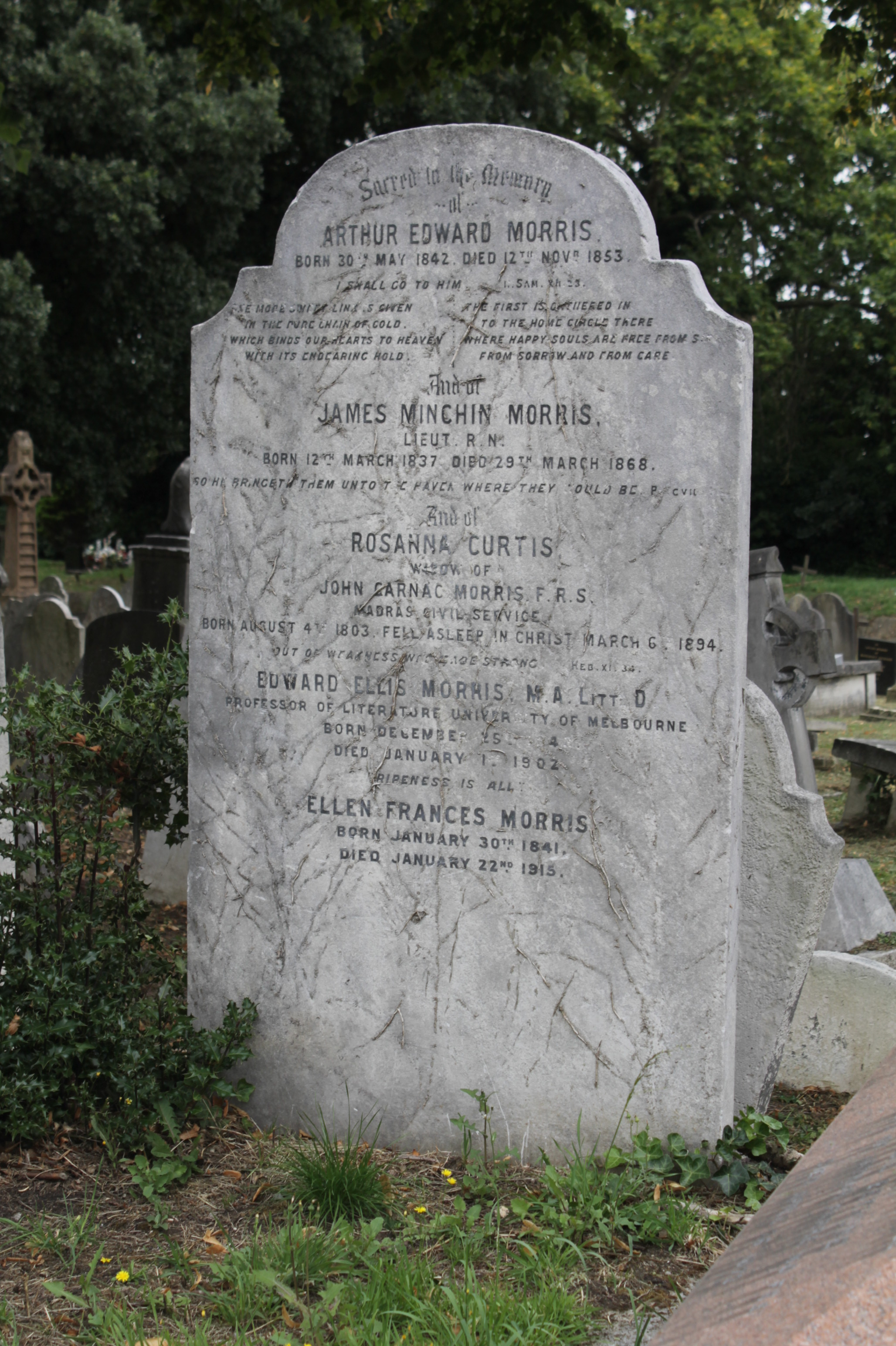
The grave of Edward Ellis Morris, Kensal Green Cemetery, London

Morris was born in Madras, British India, the fourteenth child of John Carnac Morris, accountant-general of the British East India Company at Madras, and his wife Rosanna Curtis (1803-1894). Morris was educated at Rugby School and Lincoln College, Oxford, where he graduated B.A. in 1866, with final honors in classics, law, and modern history, and M.A. in 1869. He was an assistant master at St Peter's College, Radley, and at Haileybury, and in 1871 became headmaster of the Bedfordshire middle-class public school. From 1875 to 1883 he was headmaster of the Melbourne Church of England grammar school which made progress under his direction. During his period he established the prefect system in 1876 and started the first school journal and the first school library in Melbourne. Morris resigned from Melbourne Grammar in March 1882 after financial difficulties hit the school; pupil numbers were in decline, partly due to the economic environment and partly to Morris's disciplinary measures.

In November 1882 Morris was appointed Hughes professor of English at the University of Adelaide. In 1883 Morris accepted an offer from the University of Melbourne for the position of professor of modern languages and literature. Morris introduced courses in English, French, and German languages and literature. Morris took a prominent part in the management of the university; for several years he was president of the professorial board, and he was also 1876 elected to the council of Trinity College. He had also many outside interests and he suggested that a branch of the Charity Organization Society, of which he was the first president, was founded in Melbourne in 1887. The Melbourne Shakespeare Society, for many years the most flourishing literary society in Victoria, was also founded on his suggestion and was its inaugural president 1884–1888. Morris took the greatest interest in the Melbourne public library of which he was appointed a trustee in 1879. He became vice president of the trustees in 1896. His "Memoirs of George Higinbotham" was published in 1895, and his most important work, his painstaking and valuable Austral English: A Dictionary of Australasian Words, Phrases And Usages was published in 1898. For this, he was awarded a Litt. D. degree by the University of Melbourne. Austral English has been praised for its basis on "historic" (OED) principles, citing examples of use for each entry through time. It suffered, however, in ignoring street vocabulary, even highly current, inoffensive words such as "pub".

== Personal life ==
Morris married the eldest daughter (died 1896) of George Higinbotham in 1879. Morris died while on a visit to Europe on 1 January 1902. He was survived by a son and three daughters. Morris also wrote two small volumes for the "Epochs of Modern History" series, The Age of Anne (1877), and The Early Hanovarians (1886). Morris edited the four volumes of Cassell's Picturesque Australasia (1887–89) and some of his lectures were also published separately. He had completed a work, Cook and his Companions, before his death, which has not been published. He also edited a book titled Australia's First Century, 1788 - 1888 from Cassell's Picturesque Australasia.
