= Frank Critchley Parker =

Australian journalist & newspaper publisher

Frank Critchley Parker (9 October 1862 – 19 October 1944), commonly referred to as Critchley Parker, was an Australian journalist and newspaper publisher.

== History ==
Parker was born Ernest Frank Parker in modest circumstances in Richmond, Victoria to J. W. Parker and Ellen Sophia Parker, née Bartlett (died 10 November 1923). He was apprenticed to a printer, and began his journalistic career as proprietor of The Sun, a minor Melbourne newspaper subtitled "Australia's democratic weekly newspaper". He adopted the "aristocratic" name Critchley (from a British admiral, says The Advocate, but the original of this accusation remains elusive) to become Frank Critchley Parker or, more often, F. Critchley Parker or simply Critchley Parker. In 1893 he moved The Sun office to an alley off Little Bourke Street, hired Miss May Manning as sub-editor and gave it a new subtitle "The society courier" and a new look. As a fashionable ladies' journal it did very well, and he was able to publish a Sydney Sun as well.

In 1895 he became publisher of the Sydney-based Australian Mining Standard. The London-based Money Market Review, and a later magazine Australian Statesman and Mining Standard followed. E. H. Oliphant served as editor or editor-in-chief of each of those publications.

Parker died aged 82 at his home at 28 Tivoli Place, South Yarra, Victoria.

== Other interests ==
In 1894 Parker and Edward Sass wrote, for a Theatre Royal charity fundraiser, a comedietta, Emancipated, which was well received.

== Criticism ==
The Advocate of Melbourne, and Freeman's Journal of Sydney, Roman Catholic weeklies, had little positive to say about Parker: he had no intelligence, they said, only the ability to exploit that possessed by others; that he adopted "Critchley" to mask his plebeian origins; he employed Oliphant to supply the wit for his own "false, offensive and bigoted" anti-Catholic invective.

== Family ==
According to one (hostile) source, he married in 1899, divorced in 1909; no further details given. On 12 April 1910 he married Kathleen Kerr (died 1970); they had a son, Critchley Parker, jun., on 11 April 1911.

He had a sister, Cora Critchley Parker (died 29 November 1937).

== Critchley Parker, jun. ==
His son, whom he named Critchley Parker (11 April 1911 – April 1942), is remembered for his efforts to establish a Jewish homeland in Australia. He died while attempting to hike alone from Port Davey to Fitzgerald, Tasmania. An experienced bushwalker, he left Port Davey on 29 March 1942, but his body was not discovered until the following September.

Both father and son were sympathetic to the problems encountered by Jews, made manifest by Germany during World War II, and supported the establishment of a Jewish settlement in Australia. The first site proposed was in the north of Western Australia, but enthusiasm for the area waned after Darwin was bombed by Japan. Attention then fell on the rugged south of Tasmania and Port Davey, supported by Critchley and others, notably the Russian Dr Isaac Steinberg, a leader of the Freeland League, and the premier of Tasmania, Robert Cosgrove. Critchley jun. travelled to Port Davey with the express purpose of surveying the site for a settlement, but the weather was against him and he died in his tent, "surrounded by plans and notes for the new Jewish homeland". Critchley Parker, junior, Reserve in Upper Beaconsfield was named for him.
