= Garrick Club (Melbourne) =

The Melbourne Garrick Club (Note: The name paid homage to the great actor David Garrick, and had no connection to the Garrick Club of London, a "gentlemen's club" for thespians and patrons of the theatre.) was an association of people with interests in the theatre, founded in 1855 in Melbourne, Australia, and disbanded around 1866 after the death of one of its "leading lights".

== History ==
The club, whose aims were "the cultivation of dramatic literature and art, and the occasional production of dramatic representations in aid of charitable and other purposes", was founded with around 50 members, including:

- President: Richard Hengist Horne, the poet and critic, "Orion"
- Vice-president James Smith of The Argus
- Secretary: Dr James Edward Neild
- Treasurer: James Coates

Other members included:

- Sir William A'Beckett (Chief Justice)
- William M. Akhurst, journalist and writer of burlesques
- S. H. Banks
- W. B. Baxter
- Alfred Bliss, auctioneer of Bliss & Joy
- Charles Edward Bright
- G. V. Brooke
- H. A. Bruce
- John Buckley Castieau of Beechworth
- J. H. Deorwyn (c. 1623 – 6 August 1888), actor
- John Edwards jun. (born 1836 in Launceston), barrister, "the Collingwood chicken"
- R. Henningham
- W. J. Henningham
- W. B. Hickling
- G. J. Hough
- George H. R. Ireland
- William Levev
- Archibald Michie journalist and politician
- Thomas Pavey, solicitor
- G. H. Rogers, actor, comedian
- Dr Clement Sconce
- James Smith
- Henry Gyles Turner
- Theodore W. Whipham
- W. H. Williams
- William John Wilson, theatrical scene painter
- Richard Younge, stage manager

The club was formed at "Williams' dining rooms" in Elizabeth Street; later meetings were held at the Kelly's Argus Hotel, adjacent The Argus newspaper offices. It went into recess around 1866. One of its last activities was a concert to raise money for a memorial to the great actor G. V. Brooke.
