= Ernest Henry Clark Oliphant =

Australian journalist

Ernest Henry Clark Oliphant (14 August 1862 – 20 April 1936), commonly referred to as E. H. Oliphant or Professor Oliphant, was an Australian journalist, an authority on Elizabethan literature, a popular public speaker and occasional playwright.

== Life ==
Oliphant was the son of Felix Edwin Oliphant (c. 1809 – 19 February 1888) and Mary Bullers Oliphant, née Frost (died 28 March 1894) His father gave his occupation as "gentleman", and apart from involvement in a few causes associated with aid to immigrants, nothing has been found of his activities, and from the obituaries it would appear Oliphant was closer to his mother. He was educated at Scotch College, Melbourne and the University of Melbourne, but did not graduate. He was employed 1884–1888 as a librarian assistant at the Melbourne Public Library, after which he left for Europe.

Oliphant returned to Melbourne in 1893 and settled in Korumburra, Victoria, where he became editor and proprietor of the Korumburra Times and in 1895 party to a well-publicised slanging match with his opposite number at the Southern Mail in the same town. The following year he was offered a position with the Bendigo Advertiser, as town's Argus mining correspondent.

In 1898 he joined the staff of Critchley Parker's Australian Mining Standard, helping produce the booklet Victoria, Its Mines and Minerals. In 1899 he left for Queenstown, Tasmania as editor of the Mount Lyell Standard, then returned to Melbourne in 1902. While in Tasmania he discovered a reef of high-quality asbestos at Lynchford/ He was Sydney editor of Parker's Australian Mining Standard from 1903 to 1906, when he left for London to take up editorship of Parker's Money Market Review. The 50th anniversary of that paper coincided with the centenary of Argentina's independence, so he celebrated both with a special issue, noting how that country was going through a boom period.

He returned to Melbourne, and from 1911 to 1918 was editor-in-chief of Parker's Mining Standard, shortly renamed Australian Statesman and Mining Standard. In August 1914 he published Germany and Good Faith, a history of Prussia's royal family. It was a considerable work of scholarship which was praised by the Times Literary Supplement and enjoyed good sales.

He was a member of the Melbourne Shakespeare Society and its president from 1919 to 1921.

Oliphant was a founding member of the Mermaid Play Society, whose first production, Beaumont and Fletcher's The Knight of the Burning Pestle was staged at the Church of England Girls' Grammar School hall on 2 October 1919, produced by Arthur Goodsall. Everyman followed on 28 October, then The Winter's Tale, The Comedy of Errors and The Critic, all produced by Goodsall. In October 1920 Everyman was produced by Mrs F. L. Apperly, an MA from Trinity College Dublin and a longtime member of the Irish Players. Oliphant's contribution to the workings of the society has not been determined.

In 1925 he left for America, where he was appointed lecturer in Elizabethan drama at Stanford University, California, also acting as guest lecturer at other American colleges and universities. In 1927 Yale University published his most important work, The Plays of Beaumont and Fletcher, his study on the relative contributions of the two dramatists. In 1929 he published the two-volume collection Shakespeare and his Fellow Dramatists in New York. Oliphant was then associated with New York University.

He returned to Melbourne in 1932, and was appointed Sidney Myer lecturer in Elizabethan drama at Melbourne University, a post he held for the rest of his life.

He was a popular figure on radio, known for reading and discussing short story masterpieces on 3LO 1932–1936

He died at his home at South Yarra and his remains were cremated at Springvale after a private funeral.

=== Plays ===
- The Taint – a man inherits the vices of his parents. Performed by the Repertory Theatre Company on 10 April 1915.
- The Superior Race – Gregan McMahon called it "the best Australian play I ever saw . . . made Englishmen look so inferior to the Chinese that only a repertory company could afford to risk it".

=== Books ===
- Germany and Good Faith: A Study of the History of the Prussian Royal Family (August 1914)
- The plays of Beaumont and Fletcher : an attempt to determine their respective shares and the shares of others (1927) Yale University Press, Oxford University Press
- Oliphant, Ernest Henry Clark, 1862-1936 (1929), Shakespeare and his fellow dramatists : a selection of plays illustrating the glories of the golden age of English drama / edited by E.H. Oliphant, New York, Prentice-Hall, inc This was in two large volumes and included 15 plays by Shakespeare and 30 by other dramatists, with introduction and notes on their authors.
- Oliphant, E. H. C. (Ernest Henry Clark), 1862-1936 (1931), Elizabethan dramatists other than Shakespeare : a selection of plays illustrating the golden age of English drama, Prentice-Hall Effectively the same book in one volume, with the Shakespeare section omitted.

== Personal ==
Oliphant married Catherine Lavinia McWhae (1866 – 12 May 1949), daughter of Peter McWhae, on 6 September 1887

- Sydney Kathleen Oliphant (13 September 1888 – 23 February 1970) married Thomas
- Edith Mervyn Oliphant ( – ) married Stanley Anketell Allen on 14 November 1917
- Enid Karin Oliphant BA ( – ) married Douglas Ludlow Dowdell (1872–1960) on 1 December 1920.

They had homes "Windermere", Royal Parade, Parkville in 1917; "Marlow", Murphy Street, South Yarra in 1921; later "Logan House" at 390 Toorak Road, South Yarra, Victoria.
