= Beechworth =

- Town
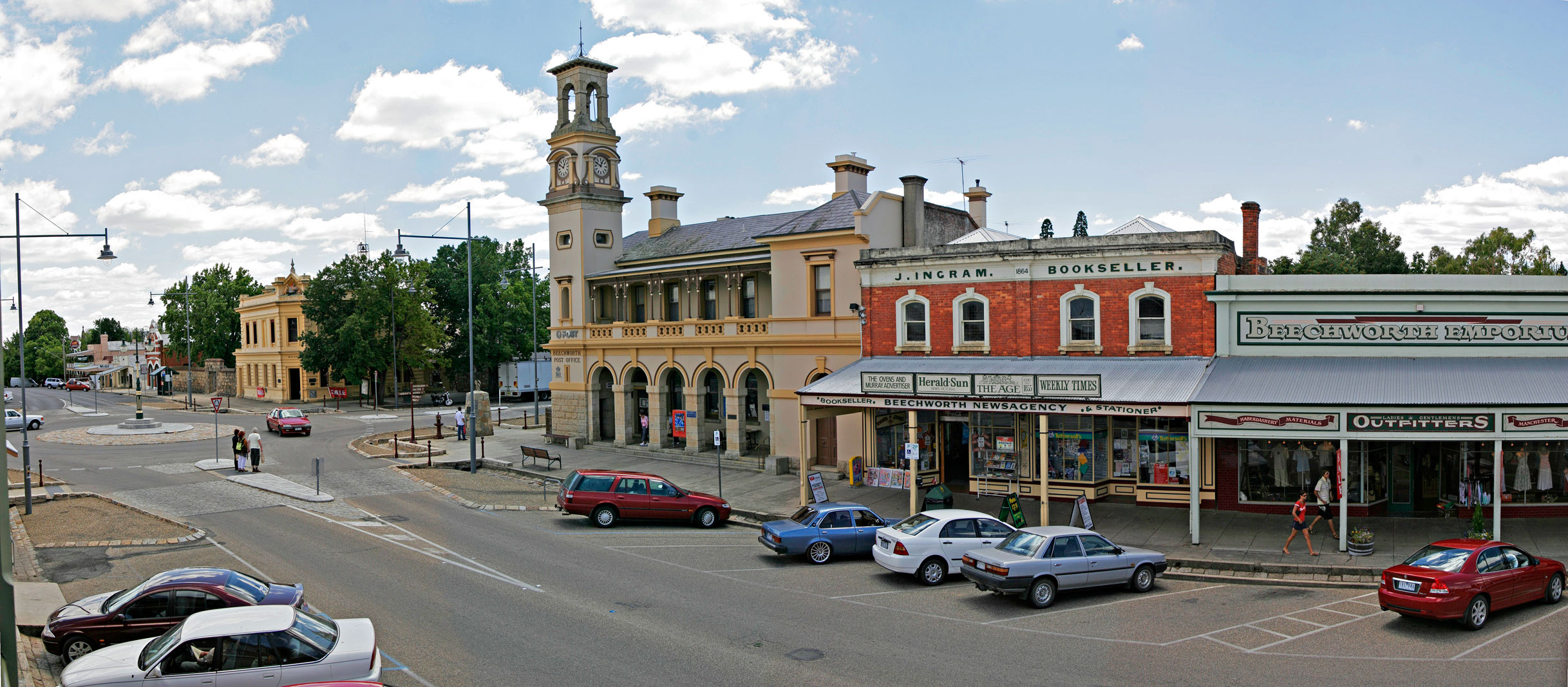
- Panorama of Beechworth town centre

- Interactive map of Beechworth
- Coordinates: 36°21′34″S 146°41′13″E
- Country: Australia
- State: Victoria
- Region: Hume
- LGA: Shire of Indigo
- Location: 284 km (176 mi) NE of Melbourne; 39 km (24 mi) SW of Wodonga; 38 km (24 mi) E of Wangaratta

Government
  - State electorate: Benambra
  - Federal division: Indi
- Elevation: 560 m (1,840 ft)

Population
  - Total: 3,290 (2021 census)
- Postcode: 3747
- Mean max temp: 18.4 °C (65.1 °F)
- Mean min temp: 7.8 °C (46.0 °F)
- Annual rainfall: 959.7 mm (37.78 in)
Localities around Beechworth
Chiltern	Wooragee
Eldorado	Beechworth
Everton Upper	Murmungee	Stanley

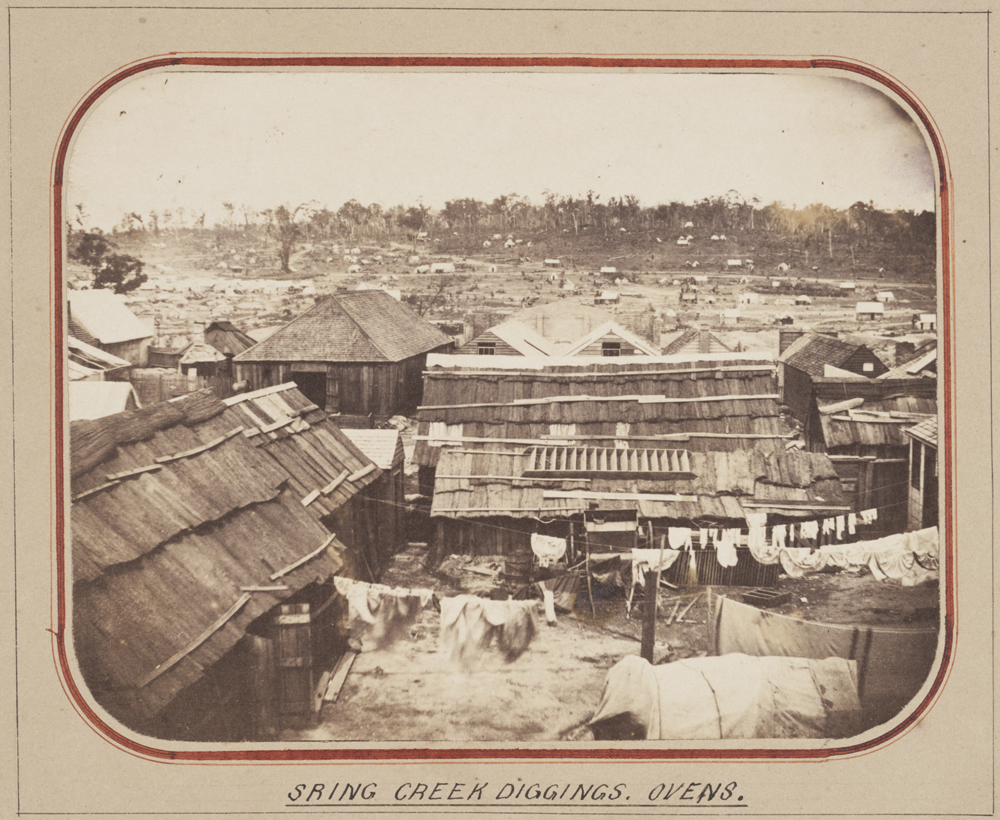
Spring Creek diggings, c. 1855. Photo by Walter Woodbury.

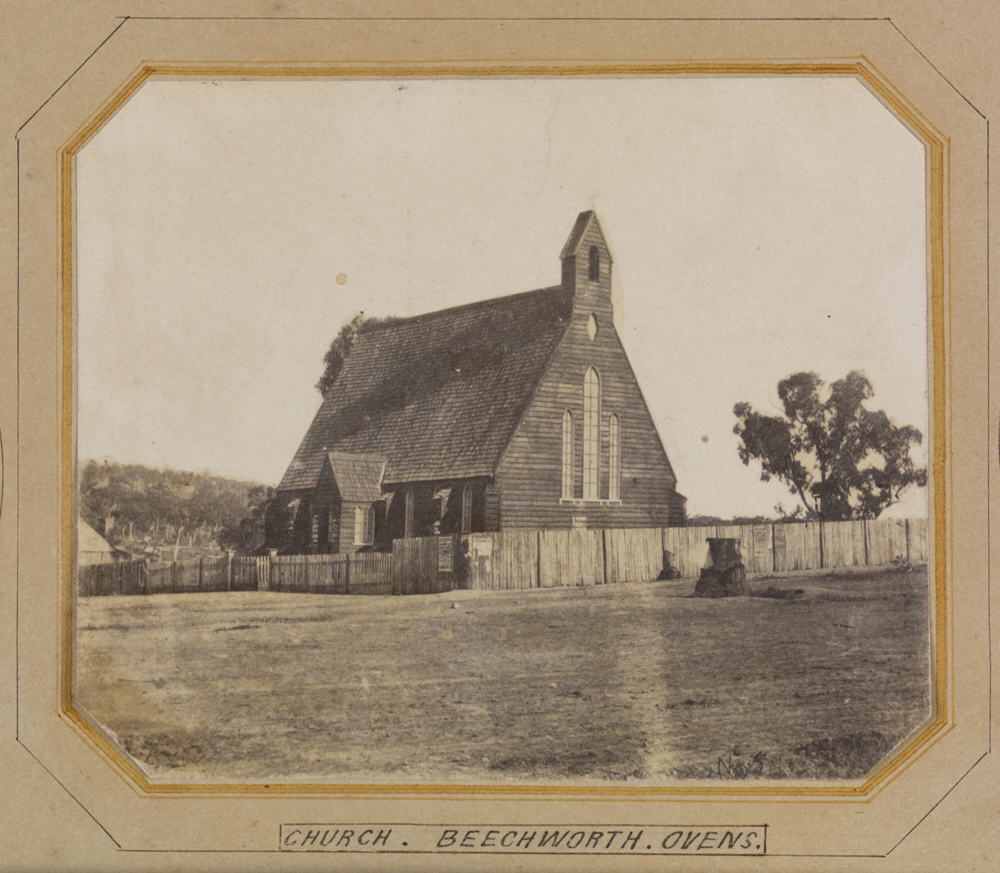
Church, Beechworth, c. 1855. Photo by Walter Woodbury.

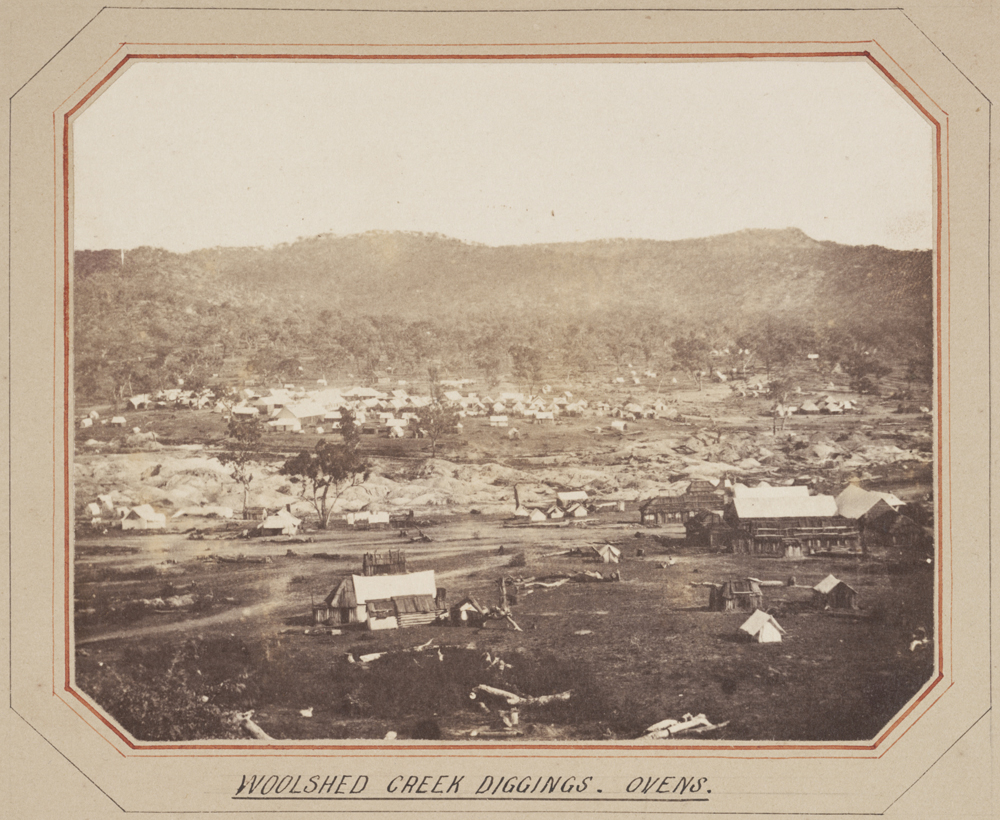
Woolshed Creek c. 1855. Photo by Walter Woodbury.

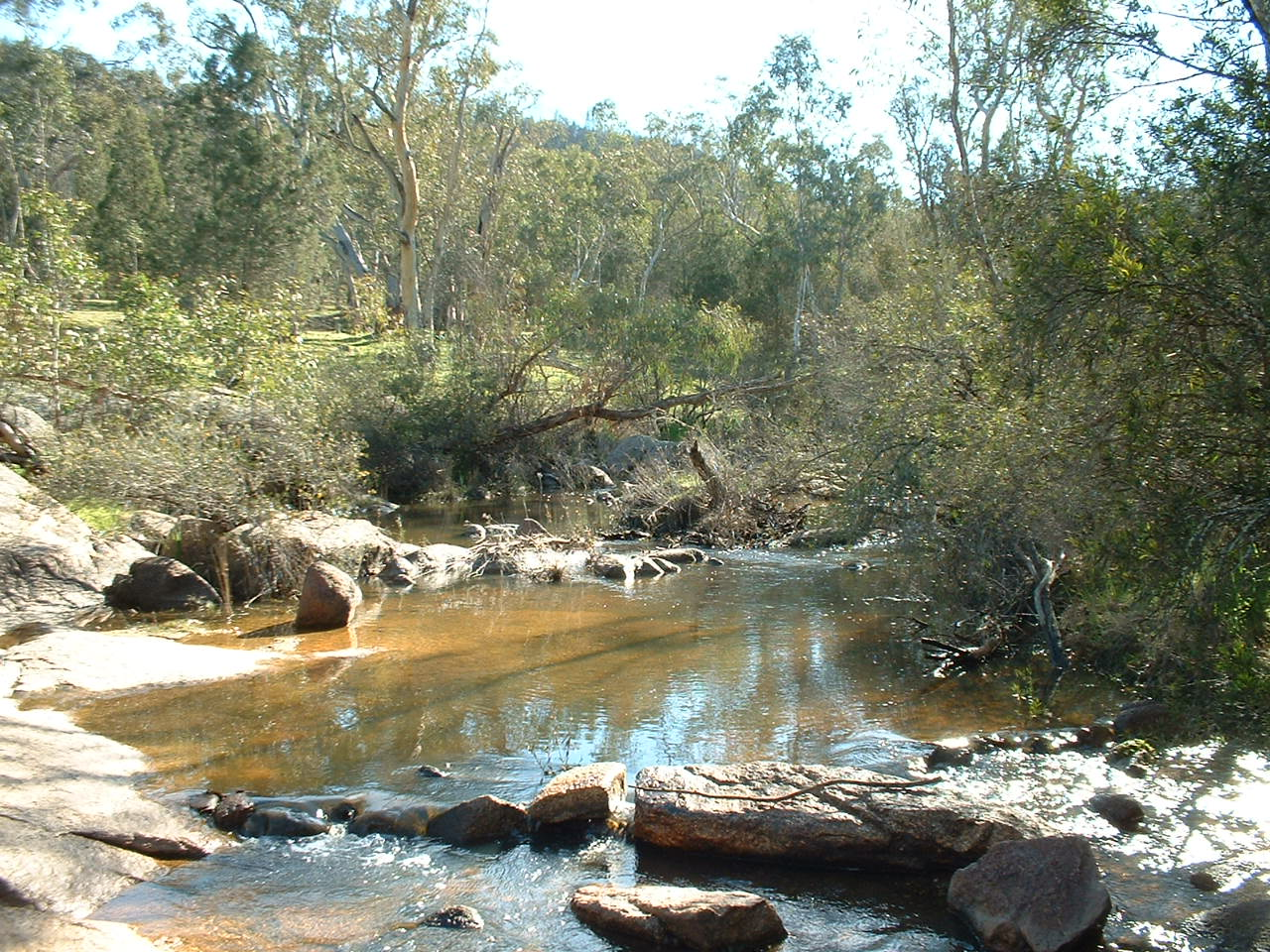
Woolshed Creek

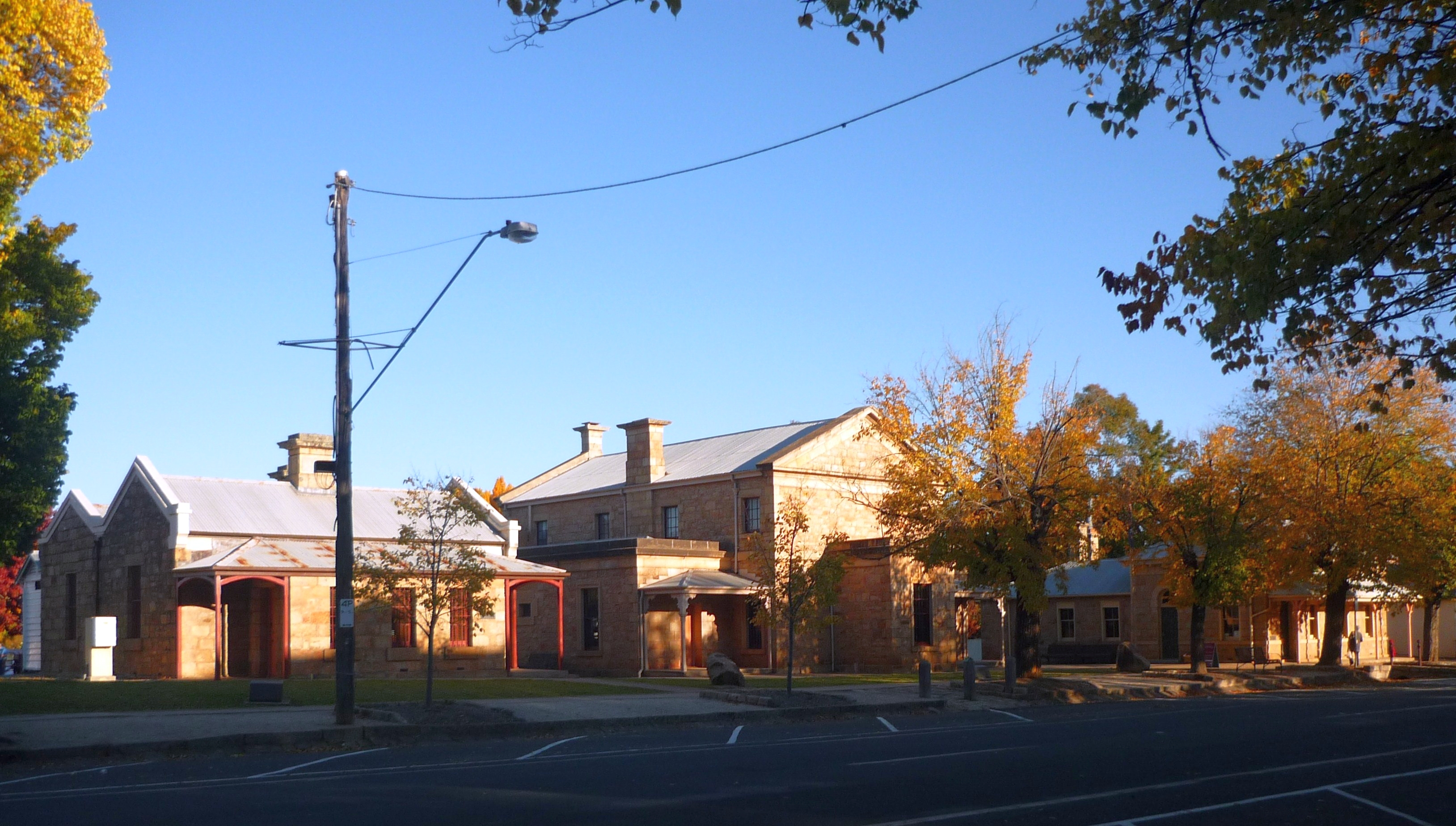
Beechworth historic precinct in Ford Street

Beechworth is a town in the north-east of Victoria, Australia, famous for its major growth during the gold rush days of the mid-1850s. At the 2021 census, Beechworth had a population of 3,290.

Beechworth's many historical buildings are well preserved and the town has re-invented itself and evolved into a popular tourist destination and growing wine-producing centre.

== History ==
Beechworth Parish and Township plans were prepared, named and certified by George D. Smythe after he had left the family estate near Liverpool in 1828, then again near Launceston, Tasmania, in 1838.

Originally used for grazing by the settler David Reid, the area was also sometimes known as Mayday Hills until 1853. The Post Office opened on 1 May 1853 as Spring Creek and was renamed Beechworth on 1 January 1854.

One Indigenous name for the area of unknown origin and language is Baarmutha.

=== Gold ===
Between 1852 and 1857, Beechworth was a gold-producing region and centre of government; however, its power, wealth and influence were short-lived. According to Carole Woods, an early party of prospectors retrieved a pan of gold from the area weighing 14 pounds (6.4 kg). Another lucky party cleared some 50 pounds (23 kg) of gold in a week. And so began a rush into this remote region. During the first election campaign in 1855, one candidate, Daniel Cameron, rode a horse shod with solid gold horseshoes. The extravagance of this event is still commemorated as the logo for Beechworth is a golden horseshoe.

At the time, Beechworth was far removed from the centre of colonial administration in Melbourne both in distance and time taken to travel. The local debates around the potential railway into Beechworth encompassed a broad gauge (5 ft 3 in / 1,600 mm) option or a narrow gauge (2 ft 6 in / 762 mm) system, between Wangaratta and Beechworth and these debates and options appeared in the Ovens and Murray Advertiser newspaper. Ironically, in the 1890s a narrow gauge system did eventuate nearby, running from Wangaratta to Whitfield. Finally a broad gauge railway arrived at Beechworth in September 1876, but by that stage the town and its gold production was waning. The rail line was closed in 1977 and dismantled, after 101 years of service.

During its boom times, Beechworth town boasted a range of industries including, a tannery, jewellers, boot makers, a brewery, blacksmiths, livestock sale yards. It had schools, a convent, hotels, a prison with imposing stone walls, a hospital, a mental hospital, court house, police barracks, stage coach companies and a powder magazine.

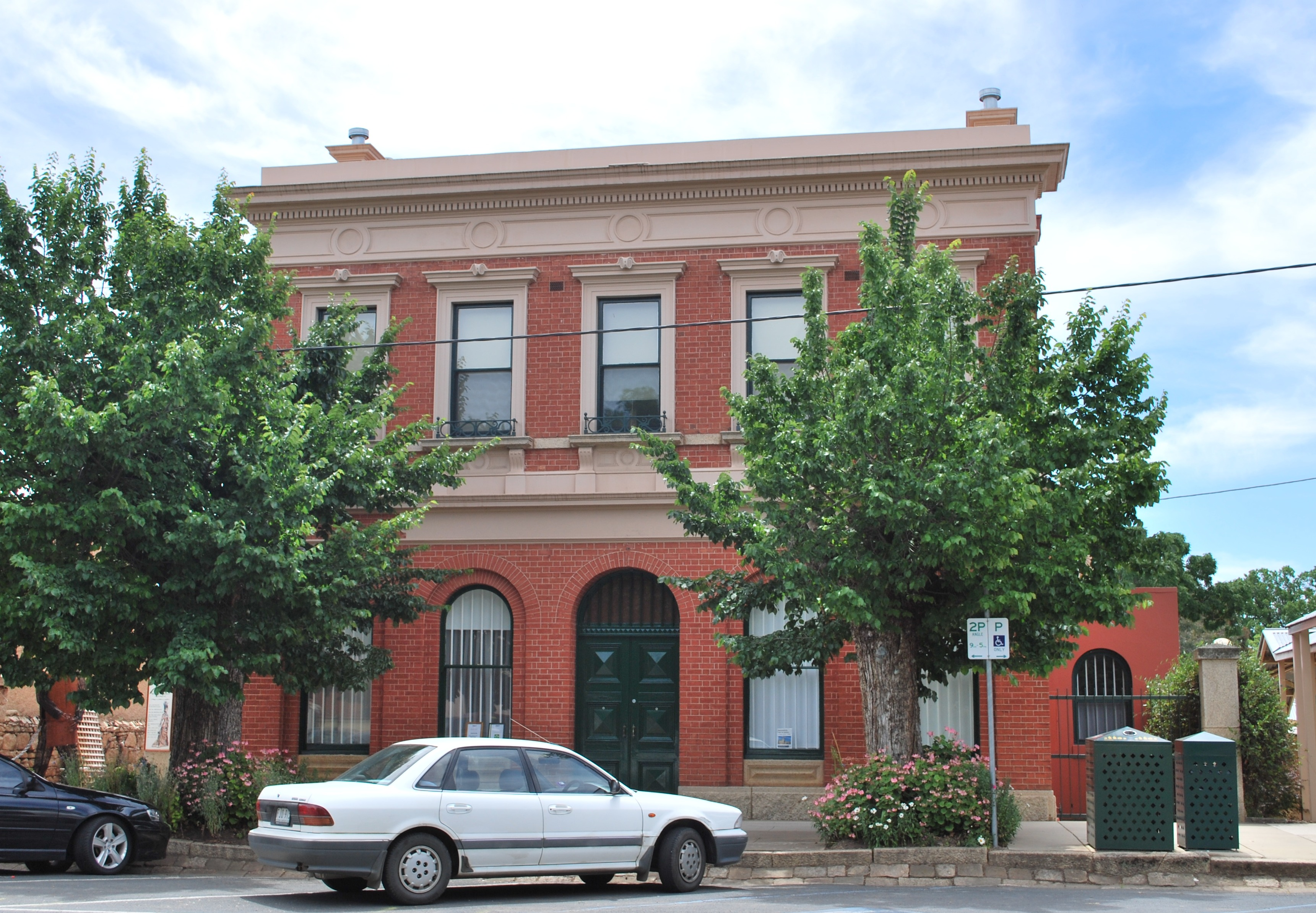
Beechworth State Bank of Victoria

In its golden days, men and women arrived from the United States, United Kingdom and China. At its peak, Beechworth town had over 3,100 residents. Surrounding areas and mining camps sprang up as thousands of miners rushed into areas such as Spring Creek, Reedy Creek, Silver Creek, the Nine Mile Creek and the Woolshed increasing the population on the Ovens to around 22,000. The Chinese were not allowed to live in Beechworth town and resided on the outskirts. Numerous controls, regulations and licence checks were enforced on the Chinese miners (see: Woods; also McWaters; also O'Brien; and Cronin). Beechworth Cemetery has a large preserved section of early Chinese miners/pioneers. The presence of the Chinese goldminers around Beechworth and throughout Victoria's north-eastern region created social unrest and these are recorded in O'Brien's; Woods'; and Cronin's works below.

=== Recent years ===
The Beechworth Magistrates' Court closed on 1 January 1990.

=== Notable figures ===
Like many Australian country towns associated with the early goldfields, Beechworth had its share of colourful characters and villains. Among the infamous during the 1870s was the one-time Livery Stable owner, later the 'Dog Officer', at some other time the 'Pound Officer' and another time shire revenue officer, John Phelan. Phelan was a continual litigant, correspondent to the newspapers and advertiser. His official and officious escapades were mockingly reported in the local paper.

==== Robert O'Hara Burke ====
Robert O'Hara Burke, leader of the ill-fated Burke and Wills expedition was stationed in Beechworth as Senior Inspector of Police from 1854 to 1857. Policeman John Sadleir, one of the Kelly Gang pursuers, was also stationed in Beechworth during its early days.(Harvey)

The Burke Museum is located in Loch Street and holds primary materials on Beechworth and the surrounding district's past. Source materials include newspapers, photos, artefacts, clothing, paintings, exhibitions, published local histories and unpublished theses on the district and displays dating back to the gold discoveries, early Chinese miners and workings of the 1850s.

==== Sir Isaac Isaacs ====
Isaac Isaacs was Australia's first native-born Governor-General, appointed in 1931. The Isaacs family moved from Yackandandah to Beechworth in 1867 to help their son to gain a better quality education, first enrolling him in the Common school then in the Beechworth Grammar School. He became dux in his first year. In his second year he was employed part-time as an assistant teacher at the school, and took up after school tutoring of fellow students. In September 1870, when Isaacs was just 15 years old, he passed his examination as a pupil teacher and taught at the school from then until 1873. Isaacs was next employed as an assistant teacher at the Beechworth State School, the successor to the Common school.

From 1875 Isaacs moved to Melbourne for work and to undertake law studies. His connection to Beechworth was re-established when he was elected as the member for Bogong in the Victorian Legislative Assembly from May 1892 until May 1893 and between June 1893 and May 1901. Isaacs further represented Beechworth and surrounding areas when he was elected to the first Federal Parliament in 1901 to the seat of Indi. He served until 1906 when he was appointed to the High Court.

His relatively little-known brother John Alfred Isaacs was also a lawyer and represented Ovens, the local electorate, from 1894 to 1902, but he died insolvent and embroiled in matrimonial problems.

==== Ned Kelly ====
The outlaw Ned Kelly had many links to Beechworth – he spent time in HM Prison Beechworth and fought a famous boxing bout with Isaiah "Wild" Wright in the back of a local hotel. Aaron Sherritt and Joe Byrne of the Kelly Gang came from the Woolshed goldmining camp, outside of Beechworth town. It was in HM Prison Beechworth that twenty-one men, suspected Kelly Gang supporters, relatives and other sympathisers were held without trial or evidence for over three months, by the Chief Commissioner of Police Captain Standish, under the Outlawry Act.

==== Margaret Bird ====
James William Ingram and his father ran a sizable book business in Beechworth trading as James Ingram & Son. It was founded in 1855 and continued until 1898. Henrietta Ingram (became Bird) was born here and she went on to run Melbourne's largest bookshop and haven for the literati in Bourke Street in the 1930s.

==== George B. Kerferd ====
George B. Kerferd (1836–1889), a longtime resident of Beechworth, became a Premier of Victoria and was a major participant in ensuring Beechworth had a railway connection to Melbourne.

==== John Buckley Castieau ====
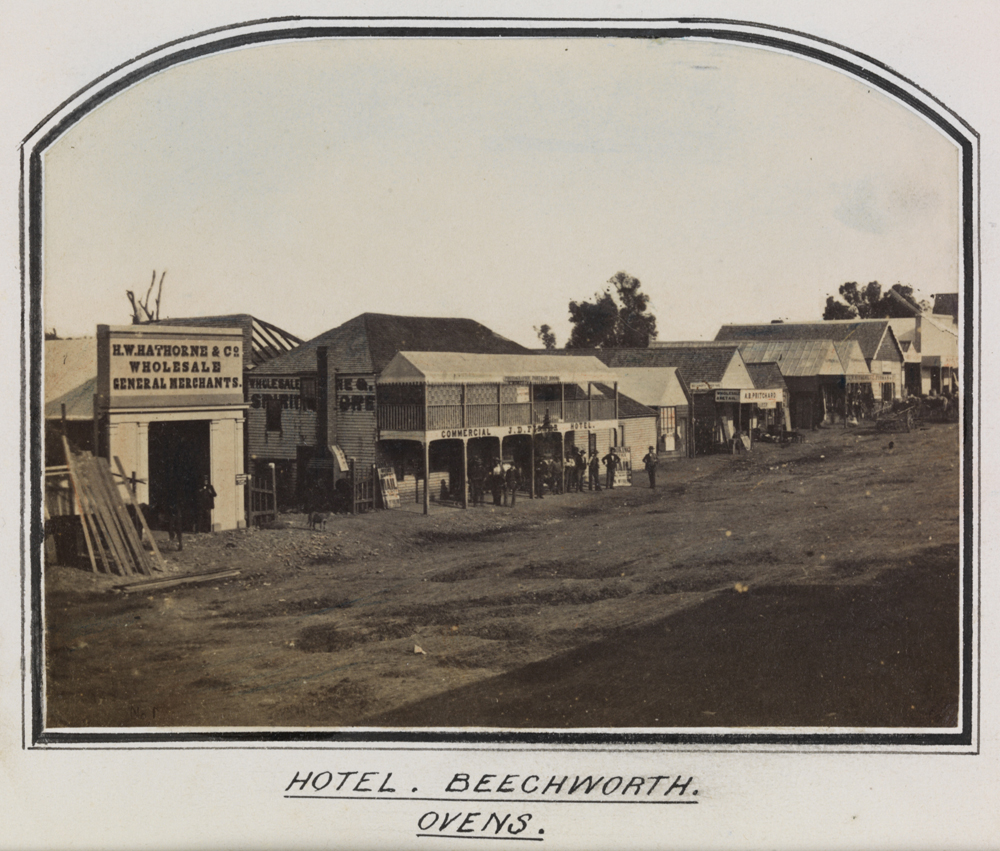
The Commercial Hotel, Beechworth, c1855

Castieau (1831–1885) was the Prison Governor at Beechworth from 1856 to 1869. The prison, famous for its huge granite walls, was known as "Castieau's castle". As the Governor of the Melbourne Gaol in 1880 he was an official witness to the hanging of Ned Kelly. His diaries were later published (2004) as The Difficulties of My Position. In this book a drawing from the Australian Sketcher, 14 August 1880 shows Castieau sitting with Ned Kelly during his remand (p. 278) and also a photo of his signature as one of the witnesses to the Kelly hanging (p. viii). Castieau was an early member of Melbourne's Garrick Club.

==== Sir Albert Edward (Bert) Chadwick ====
Born in 1897, died in 1983. Sportsman, businessman and sports administrator.

==== Alfred William Foster ====
Born in 1886, died in 1962. Judge.

== Climate ==
At the southernmost end of the South West Slopes, Beechworth has a cool climate much of the year. On account of its western longitude, summer warmth is inconsistent, often punctuated by cold fronts and cool changes (unlike in north-eastern Victoria proper where summers are relatively stable). Beechworth's climate is thus more reminiscent of that in central Victoria. As one of the higher towns in the state, snowfall can be expected most years, sometimes falling in moderate to heavy amounts.

Rainfall records are found as early as 1858, but temperature readings did not commence until 1908.

Climate data for Beechworth Composite (1908–1986, rainfall 1858–2023); 580 m AMSL; 36.37° S, 146.71° E
Month	Jan	Feb	Mar	Apr	May	Jun	Jul	Aug	Sep	Oct	Nov	Dec	Year
Record high °C (°F)	39.3 (102.7)	40.0 (104.0)	36.7 (98.1)	27.6 (81.7)	23.2 (73.8)	20.5 (68.9)	19.8 (67.6)	20.9 (69.6)	25.6 (78.1)	28.9 (84.0)	36.2 (97.2)	37.5 (99.5)	40.0 (104.0)
Mean daily maximum °C (°F)	27.3 (81.1)	27.3 (81.1)	23.9 (75.0)	18.6 (65.5)	13.9 (57.0)	10.7 (51.3)	9.6 (49.3)	11.3 (52.3)	14.3 (57.7)	17.8 (64.0)	21.5 (70.7)	25.1 (77.2)	18.4 (65.2)
Mean daily minimum °C (°F)	13.4 (56.1)	13.8 (56.8)	11.4 (52.5)	7.9 (46.2)	5.3 (41.5)	3.4 (38.1)	2.6 (36.7)	3.4 (38.1)	4.9 (40.8)	7.0 (44.6)	9.3 (48.7)	11.6 (52.9)	7.8 (46.1)
Record low °C (°F)	1.8 (35.2)	2.9 (37.2)	−0.6 (30.9)	−1.7 (28.9)	−3.9 (25.0)	−3.9 (25.0)	−5.6 (21.9)	−3.7 (25.3)	−3.0 (26.6)	−1.7 (28.9)	−1.0 (30.2)	0.9 (33.6)	−5.6 (21.9)
Average precipitation mm (inches)	51.7 (2.04)	50.5 (1.99)	61.6 (2.43)	66.4 (2.61)	91.6 (3.61)	109.5 (4.31)	109.5 (4.31)	106.6 (4.20)	90.8 (3.57)	89.1 (3.51)	69.6 (2.74)	62.5 (2.46)	959.7 (37.78)
Average precipitation days (≥ 0.2 mm)	6.1	5.8	6.7	8.1	11.3	13.3	14.9	14.9	12.7	11.4	9.1	7.7	122.0
Average afternoon relative humidity (%)	34	37	41	50	62	68	69	63	55	50	43	38	51
Source: Australian Bureau of Meteorology; Beechworth Composite

== Newspapers ==
Beechworth has had two main newspapers: The Ovens and Murray Advertiser and The Constitution and Mining Intelligencer. These papers engaged in fierce competition. The papers circulated throughout the district and the colony of Victoria.(O'Brien) Both papers represented the views of their respective readerships sometimes to the exclusion of all others.(O'Brien) Currently most editions from the early 1850 have been micro-filmed and are available at the Burke Museum, as well as most state and national libraries throughout Australia. These two local papers provide primary sources for many historians of Beechworth and its surrounds, including the Kelly Gang historians.(See: Woods (1985); McMahon (2000); Lane (1978); McQuilton (1979); Jones (1995); McWaters (2002); O'Brien (2005); and Wild & McMahon (2006))

The Ovens and Murray Advertiser still survives as a local paper.

== Tourism ==
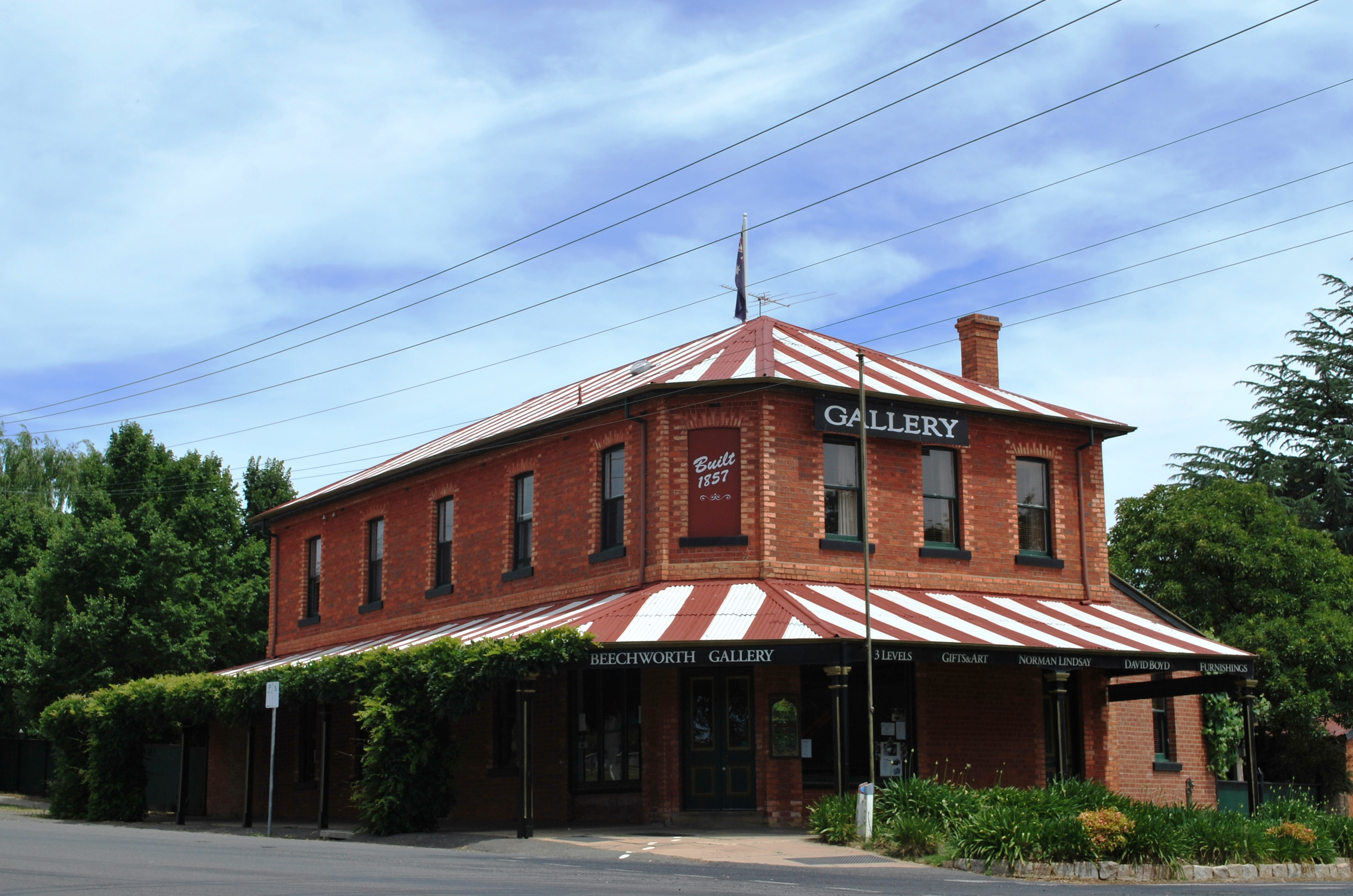
Beechworth Gallery.

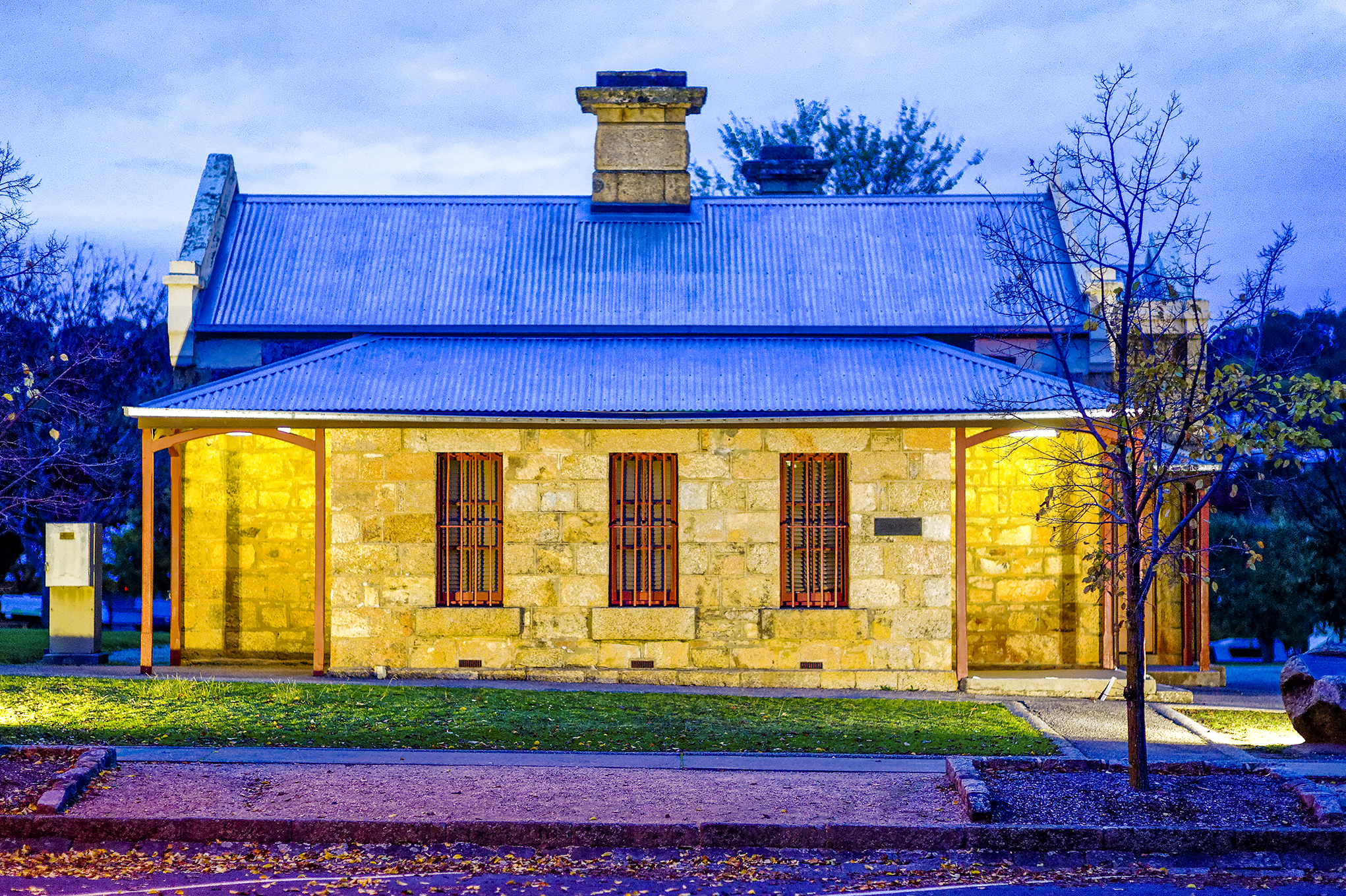
Victoria Police Station Beechworth 1880's-1990's (1858) at sunrise

Beechworth is a popular tourist destination. Attractions include Ned Kelly-themed displays at the old court house and the Ned Kelly Weekend, a recreation of the Kelly legend. It commemorates the anniversary of the outlaw's committal hearing held in the historic Beechworth Courthouse from August 6 to 11, 1880. Other popular draws to the area are its many annual festivals, including the Golden Horseshoes Festival Easter Parade through the centre of town, the Burke Museum, Forests Commission museum, waterfalls, gunpowder magazine, Newtown Bridge (stone bridge), Tail Race (mining race), Spring Creek waterfalls, Spring Creek Gorge, Beechworth Lunatic Asylum ghost tours, Linaker Motel (former nurses quarter), lakes, historic buildings, goldfields, walks, the Beechworth Bakery, brewery, the lolly shop and night tours, restaurants and wineries. The town is one end point of the Murray to the Mountains Rail Trail.

The music video for singer/actor Jason Donovan's 1989 hit "Too Many Broken Hearts" was filmed in Beechworth.

== Sport ==
The town has an Australian Rules football team (Beechworth Football Club) competing in the Tallangatta & District Football League.

Golfers play at the Beechworth Golf Club on Balaclava Road. A dedicated cross-country and downhill mountain biking track, the Beechworth Mountain Bike Park, is maintained by the Beechworth Chain Gang Mountain Bike Club. Beechworth skate park is located close to the Beechworth pool. It has three bowls: one big, one medium and one small. Beechworth also has a swimming complex consisting of three pools of varying sizes for babies, kids and adults. The adult pool is about 25 metres long. It has five lanes and it is not very deep. It has an electric barbecue and also has a canteen with cold drinks and snacks.

The Beechworth Wanderers Cricket Club currently play in the Wangaratta & District Cricket Association and have teams in A., A Reserve, B & C Grade, plus Under 16's, 14's and 12's.

== Books on Beechworth ==
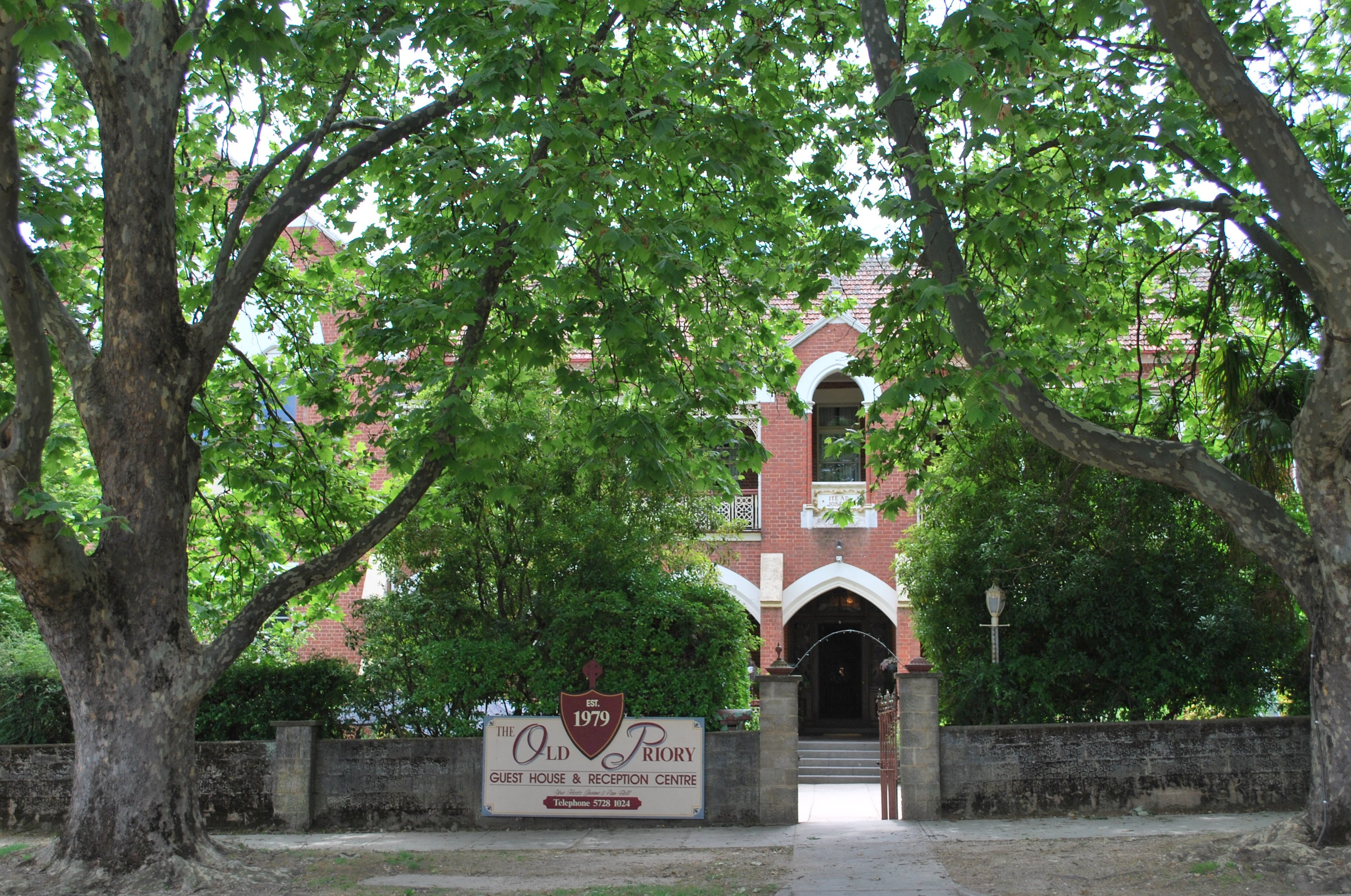
Beechworth Old Priory

A range of books cover the history of Beechworth town, its adjoining goldfield camps, and its surrounds. These include numerous histories, a treasure of local histories, theses, material on bushrangers, police, Chinese, riots, the coming and going of the railway and novels set in the district.

=== Histories ===
- Griffiths, Tom. Beechworth: An Australian Country Town and its Past, Greenhouse, North Melbourne, 1987. (solid research piece on a post-gold boom town and its re-invention)
- McQuilton, John. The Kelly Outbreak 1878–1880, Melbourne University Press, Carlton, 1979. (wonderful insight into the Kelly Outbreak in NE Victoria and its geographical causes)
- O'Brien, Antony. Shenanigans on the Ovens Goldfields: The 1859 Election, Artillery Publishing, Hartwell, 2005. (a solid, controversial piece with good insights into the social conflicts which emerged on the Ovens goldfield during an election year)
- Shea, Peter, M (2010) Champagne From Six To Six (A short social history of Recreations and Entertainments at the Beechworth and Ovens goldfields 1852–1877) Conn: Eloquent Press Illus, 189pp (informative first hand accounts of cultural activity on the Beechworth and Ovens Goldfields)
- Woods, Carole. Beechworth: A Titan's Field, Hargreen, North Melbourne, 1985. (a wide-ranging solid research piece on Beechworth from its earliest days 1830s to the late 19th century)
- Williams, Jennifer. Listen to what they say, 2005. (a comprehensive oral history of the town from the early 20th century to the modern era)
- Cronin, Kathryn. Colonial Casualties: Chinese in Early Victoria, Melbourne University Press, Carlton, 1997, (encompasses the Chinese miners of Northeastern Victoria)

=== Local histories ===
- Clarke, Stan. How Old is Your Grandma, Beechworth, 1987. (on the district's freemasons)
- Hanson, Anne. A White Handkerchief, Beechworth, 2010 (the story of Elizabeth Scott, the first woman hanged in Victoria and tried at the Beechworth Courthouse)
- Harvey, R. C. Background to Beechworth: From 1852, Albury, 1952. (plus subsequent editions)
- Hawley, G. & Davidson, R. Beechworth Sketchbook, Rigby, Adelaide, 1972.
- Hyndman, Ian. Beechworth Cemetery – A stroll through history, Bethel Publications, Beechworth, 1988.
- Hyndman, Ian. History of Beechworth, Bethel Publications, Beechworth.
- Lane, Leo. History of the Parish of Beechworth 1854–1978, Parish of Beechworth, 1978. (on the Catholics of the district)
- McMahon, D. M. The Golden Gum Tree: Hiram Allen Crawford, 1832–1916, Brisbane, 2000. (on an American pioneer in the district, who operated a stage coach company)
- McMahon, H. Denise. & Wild, Christine G., American Fever Australian Gold ( Americans and Canadians involved in Northeast Victoria's Gold Rush), Middle Park, Qld. 2008
- McWaters, Viviene. Beechworth's Little Canton, Albury, 2002 (on the Chinese goldminers at Spring Creek)
- Shennan, M. Rosalyn. The 1855 Ovens Election and the Gold Horseshoes, Noble Park, 1990. (on an election event in 1855)
- Shennan, M. Rosalyn. A Biographical Dictionary of the Pioneers of the Ovens and Townsmen of Beechworth, Noble Park, 1990. (A valuable resource tool for goldfields family researchers)
- Williams, David. Gold and Granite Grandeur: Living History of Beechworth, Stanley and Eldorado, 1994. (fine drawings of the buildings, churches and forest trees of the area)
- Wild, Christine, G. & McMahon, Denise, H. Old News Today: Tales of the Upper Murray: newspaper snippets from 1876–1900, McClure, Wodonga, 2006 (local newspaper cuttings 1876–1900 with hundreds of family names and events)

==== Unpublished theses ====
- O'Brien, Antony. Awaiting Ned Kelly: Rural Malaise in North-eastern Victoria 1872–73, B.A. (Hons), 1999 (sighted in Burke Museum).
- McCullough, J. Beechworth After the Gold Rush: A study of its development to 1956, B.A. (Hons), Dept of Geography, Melbourne University, 1971.
- Shea, Peter, M; (1994) Leisure as a Basis of Culture Selected Social Formations Beechworth 1852–1877) Master of Arts (Hon.), Monash University, Thesis Copy Donated by Author to Burke Museum 1996

=== Biography ===
- Brown, Max. Australian Son, 1948 (plus subsequent editions) (Social insights and contemporary 1940s photos of Beechworth and its immediate surrounds)
- Finnane, Mark. (Ed.), The Difficulties of My Position, The Diaries of Prison Governor John Buckley Castieau 1855–1884, National Library of Australia, Canberra, 2004. (insight into Beechworth's colonial society in the 1850s, '60s and '70s) ISBN 0-642-10793-9
- Sadleir, John. Recollections of a Victorian Police Officer, 1913. (includes an insight into the land turmoils surrounding the Kelly Gang)
- Gee, Margaret. A Long Way from Silver Creek, 2000. (a moving account of growing up in post-war Beechworth)
- Jones, Ian. Ned Kelly a Short Life, Lothian, Port Melbourne, 1995. (a definitive account of the Kelly story)
- Jones, Ian. The Friendship that destroyed Ned Kelly: Joe Byrne and Aaron Sherritt, Lothian, Port Melbourne, 1992.
- Kenneally, J. J. The Inner History of the Kelly Gang, 1929 (plus many subsequent editions) (This work gives insights into the Beechworth locale, the Beechworth court sessions and colonial policing)

=== Novels set in part around Beechworth ===
- O'Brien, Antony. Bye-Bye Dolly Gray, Artillery Publishing, Hartwell, 2006.
- Courtenay, Bryce. Four Fires (2001).

=== Food ===
- O'Toole, Tom. Secrets of the Beechworth Bakery, Bas, Melbourne, 2001.

=== Rail ===
- Larsen, Wal. The MayDay Hills Railway, Wal Larsen, Bright, 1976.

=== Chinese goldminers in the region ===
- Kaufman, R. J. The Chinese on the Upper Ovens Goldfields: 1855–1920, LRGM, Bright, 1997. ISBN 0-646-34017-4
- Groom, Jocelyn. Chinese Pioneers of the King Valley, Centre for Continuing Education, Wangaratta, 2001. ISBN 0-909760-23-3
- Talbot, Diann. The Buckland Valley Goldfield, Specialty Press, Albury, 2004 ISBN 0-9757170-0-6
- O'Brien, Antony. Shenanigans on the Ovens Goldfields, Artillery Publishing, Hartwell, Vic., 2005 (cited above) Chapter 3.
