= Morris Mondle Phillips =

Lawyer and public servant

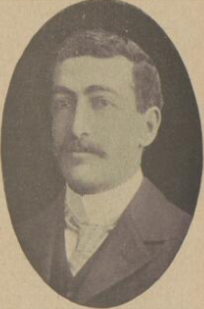
- Born: 19 May 1870; St Kilda, Victoria, Australia
- Died: 31 July 1948 (aged 78)
- Burial place: Cremated
- Education: University of Melbourne
- Occupation: Lawyer
- Partner: Rebecca Ellis
- Children: Philip David Phillips; Arthur Angell Phillips
- Parent(s): Philip David Phillips and Rose, née Asher

Morris Mondle Phillips (19 May 1870 – 31 July 1948) was a lawyer, taxing master and equity master at the Victorian Supreme Court, he was also a Chief President of the Australian Natives' Association.

== Background ==
Phillips was born on 19 May 1870 at St Kilda, Melbourne, son of Philip David Phillips (1836–1909), solicitor, and his wife Rose, née Asher. Phillips was born into an intellectual, artistic and legal family many of whom achieved highly in their chosen paths. Although his grandfather Phillip David Phillips was a leader in the Jewish community in Sydney and Melbourne, he was not religious. One of his six siblings, Marion Phillips was an ardent feminist and campaigner for human rights. As a member of the British House of Commons (1929–1931), she was the first Australian woman to be elected to a national Parliament anywhere.

Phillips attended Melbourne Church of England Grammar School in 1884–86, then entering Trinity College, Melbourne in 1888 while attending the University of Melbourne to obtain a Bachelor of Arts in 1890. Upon graduation he took articles with his father's partner (Sir) Robert Best until 1892, when the partnership broke up because his father disapproved of Best and Theodore Fink's activities during the land-boom. He was awarded his M.A. in 1892. Phillips then completed his articles with his father's new firm in 1893. He won the Supreme Court prize for articled clerks. Entering partnership with his father.

On 21 November 1894, at St Kilda, in a Jewish ceremony, he married his cousin Rebecca Ellis.

== Employment ==
Phillips occupied many positions of public importance in State of Victoria and the Commonwealth with distinction. He was Master of Equity, Supreme Court of Victoria in 1930. Having held responsibility for the estates of people in lunatic asylums, he campaigned for the establishment of the office of the State Trustee. . He became the first public trustee in Victoria in1939.

in preparation for retirement he rationalised the position and helped to design the role of its successor, master of the Supreme Court. He retired in May 1941.

== University of Melbourne ==
Apart from gaining his degree at the University of Melbourne, Phillips served the university in the following ways:

- Warden of Convocation from 24 March 1924 to 13 November 1934;
- Association, Secretary and President;
- University Extension Board from 1913 to 1934;
- Councillor from 13 November 1923 to 1924 and again from 1934 to 1939.

== Community ==
He was President of the Australian Bridge Association, and wrote 3 books on Contract bridge. He was also the President of the Rationalists Association of Victoria and the Melbourne Shakespeare Society. His wife Rebecca ("Ray") Phillips shared many interests and was active in the community on the Free Kindergarten Union, the Queen Victoria Hospital for Women and Children and the District Nursing Service.

== Australian Natives' Association ==
Phillips was a member of Malvern A.N.A. Branch No.90. He became Chairman of the Metropolitan Committee from 1904 to 1905. He was elected to the board of directors in 1908. He was elected to the office of Chief President at Ararat Annual Conference in 1913. He retired from the board of directors in 1916. He was careful and measured in his public speaking. As A.N.A.Chief President he assisted the Victorian Governor, Sir John Fuller, Captain Chambers, R.N. and Mr.F.Tate, Director of Education to unveil a stone cairn 6.096 metres high (20 ft) commemorating the voyages of Bass and Flinders. It is located on the corner of the Esplanade and Cook Street in Flinders, Victoria.

== Books ==
Phillips published a number of books on Contract Bridge and the law.

- Delivery and taxation of bills of costs, with precedents of bills of costs in all Victorian courts and notes and decisions on questions arising on taxation, by Morris Mondle Phillips, Melbourne : Charles F. Maxwell 1916;
- Delivery and taxation of bills of costs, with precedents of bills of costs in all Victorian courts and the High Court of Australia ..., by Morris Mondle Phillips, and E.H. Trebilco, Melbourne : Law Book Company of Australasia 1924;
- The open door to contract bridge / Advertiser Newspapers Limited, by Morris Mondle Phillips, Adelaide : Advertiser Newspapers Limited 1932
- Delivery and taxation of bills of costs, with precedents of bills of costs in all Victorian courts, the High Court of Australia, and Bankruptcy Court ..., by Morris Mondle Phillips, and Edgar H. Trebilco, Melbourne : Law Book Co. of Australasia 1932;
- Contracted contract : what to do in any bidding situation, and guide to all the new laws ... with illustrative examples, by Morris Mondle Phillips, Melbourne : Lothian 1933;
- Practice and precedents in the chief clerk's office : including notes of decisions relating to executors' commission, by Morris Mondle Phillips, Melbourne : Law Book Co. of Australasia 1933;
- Contracted contract : what to do in any bidding situation (including new slam bids) : and guide to all the new laws ... with illustrative examples, by Morris Mondle Phillips, Melbourne : Lothan Publishing 1933.

== Later years ==
Phillips died on 31 July 1948 and was cremated. He was survived by two sons Philip David Phillips and author Angell Phillips.
