= Margaret Bird (bookseller) =

Australian bookseller

Margaret Henrietta Bird
- Born: Margaret Henrietta Ingram; 22 November 1888; Beechworth, Victoria, Australia
- Died: 1 February 1963 (aged 74); Coburg, Victoria, Australia
- Education: Oberwyl girls' school
- Occupation: bookseller
- Spouse: Ellis Bird

Margaret Henrietta Bird (22 November 1888 – 1 February 1963) was an Australian third generation bookseller in Melbourne.

== Life ==
Bird was born in 1888 in Beechworth to a family involved in bookselling. Beechworth was the place where her grandfather had founded a booksellers and a sizable business in the state of Victoria. Her father James William Ingram was a newly established partner at James Ingram & Son and married to Catherine (born Woodside) when she was born. That business was sold and her father created another bookshop in 1898 in Melbourne that was known for its educational books. Margaret was sent to board at Oberwyl girls' school in Melbourne's St Kilda which had been founded by the Swiss art patron Madame Elise Pfund.

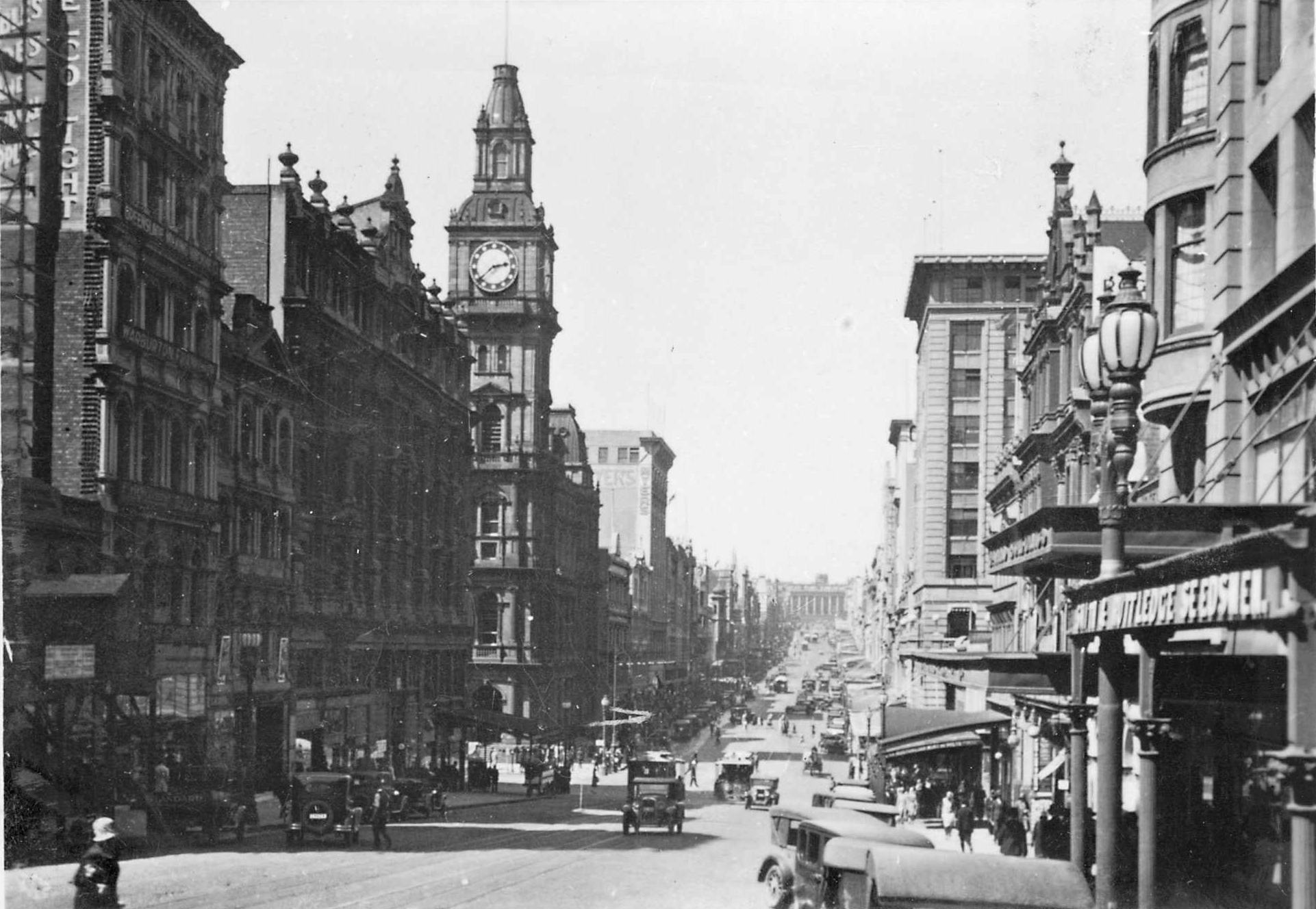
Bourke Street in Melbourne in 1935

Ellis Bird's Books was at 21 Bourke Street in Melbourne from 1925. The shop sold second-hand books. She had run it with her husband (Ellis Bird) who died in 1927. He had founded the business in 1918 before she married him in 1922. He was interested in communism and both of them were fans of G. K. Chesterton and they formed a similarly minded groups known as the "Heretics". Chesterton was a wide ranging writer who was one of the leaders of the literati in London.

She continued to trade under her late husband's name and her bookshop was said to be the most popular in Melbourne. She entertained customers and visitors who included the poet Marie Pitt. Nettie Palmer who was said to be "possibly the most important literary critic in Australia" at the time was a visitor with her husband Vance. Melbourne's bookshops were managed by women including Chaucer’s and Everyman’s. Independent bookshops included Ellis Bird's, Margareta Webber and Vida Goldstein's sister Elise Belle Champion.

Bird retired in 1959. She died in the Melbourne suburb of Coburg in 1963.
