= James Edward Neild =

English-born Australian forensic pathologist, drama critic, medical editor and journalist

James Edward Neild L.S.A.(Lond.), M.D., Ch.M. (Melb.), (6 July 1824 – 17 August 1906) was an English-born Australian forensic pathologist, drama critic, medical editor and journalist.

== Early life ==
Neild was born in Doncaster, Yorkshire and is descended from an Irish family who emigrated to England in 1642. He received his early education in Leeds, and in 1843 he went to Sheffield to his uncle, a surgeon in extensive practice there, to whom he was apprenticed for five years. Subsequently, he completed his medical studies at University College, London. He passed his examination in 1848, and for two years was in practice at Oulton, West Yorkshire, near Leeds. He was then for three years house surgeon of the Rochdale General Dispensary.

== Career in Australia ==
In 1853 Neild followed the gold rush to Victoria, and practised surgery for a time, but ultimately decided to stay in Melbourne, where he went into business as a chemist and druggist. In 1855, in company with R. H. Horne and others, he founded Melbourne's Garrick Club. That same year he became a reporter on the Melbourne Age, then only just started. After ceasing regular connection with the Age, he contributed a good many occasional theatrical notices to that paper. He was engaged by T. L. Bright to write theatre criticism for his magazine My Notebook (1856–1859), then the proprietors of the Argus issued the Examiner in 1857, with Bright as its first editor, and for upwards of two years Neild wrote the theatrical criticisms under the signature of "Christopher Sly". Ultimately The Examiner, The Yeoman, and The Weekly Argus were blended into one, under the title of The Australasian, in which Dr. Neild continued to do the theatrical criticism under the signature of "Jaques" or "Jacques" and in more recent times under the nom de plume of "Tahite". He also used "Cleofas" and "The Grumbler". His connection with the Argus, which belonged to the same proprietary as the Australasian, commenced in 1868, and he also contributed to Melbourne Punch and other papers. In 1864 he retired from the business as a chemist which he had carried on meanwhile, and resumed the practice of his profession. Almost coincidentally he accepted the editorship of the Australian Medical Journal, and began to take an active part as a member of the Medical Society of Victoria, of which in 1868 he was elected president, and of which he was subsequently honorary secretary. In 1864 he took the degree of M.D. in the University of Melbourne, and the following year was appointed lecturer on forensic medicine. He continued to contribute to The Australasian, and was in 1868 the target of a threat by J. H. Leroy, husband of the actress Madame Marie Duret, after an adverse notice. Neild was the author of several novelettes, and had two comediettas successfully placed upon the stage.

Neild was a founder of the Melbourne Shakespeare Society, being president in 1890. Also in 1890, Neild was given a public testimonial at the Princess Theatre with his friend George Selth Coppin presiding. This was to recognise his many public services, particularly to the theatre. He was hugely influential in theatrical circles, described as a "dictator in Melbourne theatrical affairs". He wrote the dedication poem for the Bijou Theatre in November 1876, read by G. B. W. Lewis.

== Family ==
In 1857, Neild married the eldest daughter of D. R. Long. Their daughter Caroline "Carrie" Neild (died 29 July 1927), also known by her stage name Carrie Bilton, toured professionally for many years, notably in Robbery Under Arms for Alfred Dampier.

Neild died in Melbourne, Victoria on 17 August 1906. Several of his scrapbooks, previously considered lost or destroyed, have come to light and are now held by the State Library of Victoria. They reveal the pleasure Neild took in the ignominious downfall suffered by many of the targets of his more malicious criticisms. The scrapbooks also contained critiques of Checkmated, a poorly written roman à clef about Neild's illicit lovelife, written by Mrs. T. P. Hill, née Cecelia Ayliffe (1838–1915) well-connected daughter of South Australian pioneer Dr. George Ayliffe.
