= William Alexander Osborne =

William Alexander "Ossie" Osborne (26 August 1873 – 28 August 1967) was Professor of Physiology at the University of Melbourne.

== History ==
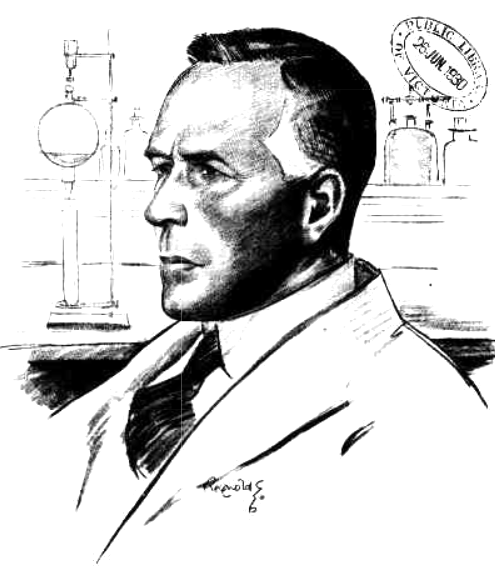
1930 portrait by Reynolds

Osborne was born at Holywood, County Down, Ireland, son of the (Presbyterian) Rev. Henry Osborne and Martha Jane Osborne, née Alexander, and educated at the Upper Sullivan School, Holywood, and Queen's College, Belfast, winning a scholarship that took him to the University of Tübingen, Germany, where he studied biochemistry and physics, graduating D.Sc. in 1899. He was then appointed lecturer at University College, London, subsequently assistant to Professor E. H. Starling.

In 1903 he succeeded Sir Charles Martin as professor of physiology and histology at the University of Melbourne. According to Barry Jones, he could have equally been appointed Professor of English literature, so wide and deep was his scholarship; he responded to the university's inability to attract suitable academic staff by also acting as dean of agriculture, also teaching pharmacology. He established a lectureship in biochemistry to which William Young was eventually recruited.

Osborne mentored several notable students including (Sir) Macfarlane Burnet, (Dame) Kate Campbell, (Sir) John Eccles, Charles Kellaway, and (Sir) Douglas Wright.

In December 1915 Osborne had a discussion with Prime Minister Billy Hughes on the necessity for government-funded research. In March 1916 an Advisory Council of Science and Industry was convened, with Professor (later Sir) Orme Masson the dominant influence. Osborne was conspicuously not invited, nor was he involved with establishing the C.S.I.R. Masson and Professor Richard Berry have been named as his chief antagonists.

His critics were numerous, with various bases for their antipathy, chief of them being his proud omnicompetence. Osborne was not innocent of bias: he was profoundly contemptuous of politics and politicians, likewise of lawyers, excepting rationalists like Sir John Latham and Sir Owen Dixon. Osborne was an intellectual atheist who reserved his most cutting remarks for Catholicism and Catholics, particularly those from southern Ireland. He also had a low opinion of "Japanese, Negroes and Aborigines", but admired Jews and Hungarians.

In 1938 he retired to his 500 acres (200 ha) property at Kangaroo Ground, later living at Magnetic Island, Queensland, from where he became involved with Townsville University College, to whose library he donated a considerable collection of literary volumes.

Osborne died at the hospital in Diamond Valley and his remains were cremated.
