= Tom O'Toole (businessman) =

Australian inspirational speaker

Tom O'Toole OAM
- Born: 30 January 1952 (age 74); Tocumwal, New South Wales
- Occupations: Baker, CEO and speaker

Tom O'Toole OAM (born 30 January 1952) is an Australian inspirational speaker, author and businessman in the bakery industry. In 1969, at the age of seventeen Tom O’Toole entered the bakers apprentice program and has been involved in the bakery business ever since. In 1974 Tom O’Toole started his career as a bakery business owner by purchasing his first shop in Beechworth, Victoria. In 1977, he sold the business and moved to Augusta in Western Australia, where Tom O’Toole made his mark as a leading country baker. In 1984 Tom O’Toole returned to Beechworth, Victoria, and purchased the badly run-down bakery again, this time including an attached building for expansion, and has been in business ever since.

The Beechworth Bakery retail outlets created by Tom O’Toole today serve over 1 million customers with a net intake of more than 12 million dollars annually. There are now seven more bakeries located across Victoria and New South Wales, Australia in the towns of - Echuca, Albury, Healesville, Bendigo, Ballarat, Yackandandah and Bright.

== Biography ==
=== History ===
Born in the small rural town of Tocumwal, NSW, Australia in 1952, to an Irish father and an Australian mother (mum), Tom O’Toole was one of five siblings (four boys and one girl). O'Toole's childhood home was a primitive two-room house consisting of a kitchen and a bedroom. Throughout his school years O'Toole was more of a dreamer than a student, and neither mathematics nor reading and writing had much of an impact on him. He finally dropped out of school at the age of 14.

=== Family ===
Tom O'Toole's father was originally from Ireland, where he had spent his childhood before coming to Australia. His mother was a native Australian and together they had five children, of which Tom was the second youngest, followed by his brother James. (He has a sister named Betty and three brothers, Terry, Mickey and James.) While his father worked full-time at providing for the family and his mother took care of the kids and the house, economic times limited the extent of their lifestyle.

== Business history ==
=== Career ===
O'Toole and the Beechworth Bakery were awarded ‘The most significant regional attraction’ in the Victorian Tourism Awards for 1994, 1995 and 1998, presented each time by the Governor of Victoria, Richard McGarvie and his wife Leslie.
