= Edward Sugden (Methodist) =

British Methodist clergy (1854–1935)

Edward Holdsworth Sugden (19 June 1854 – 22 July 1935) was the first master of Queen's College (University of Melbourne). He was, in partnership with the Methodist Church, responsible for laying down the foundings of the college including the Sugden Principle.

== Early life ==
Sugden was born in Ecclesfield, near Sheffield, Yorkshire, England. He was the eldest son of Rev. James Sugden, a minister of the Wesleyan Methodist Church and his wife Sarah, née Holdsworth.

Sugden was educated at the boarding school Woodhouse Grove School, and in 1870 passed the London matriculation examination, gaining first place on the list, which entitled him to the Gilchrist scholarship of fifty pounds a year for three years at Owens College, Manchester. There he studied, among other things, Greek testament textual criticism, Hebrew, and English poetry. Sugden was always grateful to his school for having taught him to sing by note, and at Manchester he studied harmony and counterpoint under (Sir) John Frederick Bridge, afterwards known as "Westminster Bridge", then organist at Manchester Cathedral.

Sugden took his degree with honours in classics at University of London in 1873, and a year later was accepted for the Methodist ministry and appointed assistant tutor at Headingley theological college, Leeds. While in this position he took the degree of BSc (1876) He was seven years at Headingley college, was then appointed a junior circuit minister, and spent six successful years at this work. Sugden continued his interest in music and became a member of the Leeds Festival Chorus, and he also did some experimental work in psychical research and particularly in thought reading. Sugden married Mary Florence, née Brooke, at Stockport, Cheshire, England, on 22 August 1878; Mary died in childbirth in 1883. On 27 October 1886 Sugden married Ruth Hannah Thompson (d. 1932) at Bradford, Yorkshire, England; Sugden later described her as "my incomparable helpmate in every part of my work".

In 1887 Sugden was appointed the first master of Queen's College, Melbourne, and began his duties early in 1888.

== Queen's College ==
In 1878 the Methodist Church decided to found the Queen's College, but nearly 10 years elapsed before funding allowed building to begin. The foundation-stone was laid on 19 June 1887, and on 14 March 1888 the college was formally opened. There were only 12 students in the first year; for many years there was a heavy debt on the building and an annual loss on the working of the college. Gifts and bequests came in over time however, and although four additions were made to the building during Sugden's term as master, he left it free of debt. Sugden's methods were based on those of his close friend and mentor, Benjamin Hellier—to find something in every person he could respect to use as a basis to build upon. The overall development of the students was encouraged by reading circles and the performance of plays in the college. Musicians were welcomed in Sugden's home circle where Sugden himself would play the cello in a quartette. Sugden gathered distinguished scholars and involved them in the life of Queen's College. Among the first honorary fellows were three world-renowned anthropologists, Lorimer Fison, William Howitt, and Sir Baldwin Spencer. Among the newly appointed professors to the University from overseas who Sugden welcomed as resident members were William Ralph Boyce Gibson, Harold Woodruff, Sir Robert Wallace and Sir Samuel Wadham.

In 1890 the dining-hall and several students' rooms were added to the college building, and 20 years later the eastern façade was completed. In 1919 Queen's College main tower, which houses the library, and a new front wing (including the chapel) were built.

In 1927 Sugden was invited to deliver the annual Fernley lecture in England, and early in 1928 he was given leave of absence with the understanding that he would retire at the end of the year. His stay in England was made pleasant by the gift of a motor-car from a Melbourne friend which met him when he landed. He returned in November, left Queen's just before Christmas, and spent his retirement at Hawthorn, a suburb of Melbourne. At Queen's College it had been the custom of the students to meet outside the master's residence on the evening of his birthday, and serenade him. Though new generations of students came who had not known Sugden, this custom was continued at his new home.

== Other achievements ==
Sugden, a Liberal Imperialist, offered his services on the outbreak of World War I and was appointed chaplain with the rank of captain and throughout the war. He spent half each working day ministering to the troops in training at Royal Park. Sugden also took interest in Methodist affairs, frequently preached, in 1906 was elected president of the Victoria and Tasmania conference. In 1923 Sugden was president-general of the Methodist Church of Australia. He was elected to the council of the University in 1899, and was a valuable member of it until its re-constitution in 1925. Sugden was also a member of the committee of the University Conservatorium of Music and later its chairman, played the cello in amateur orchestras. As choir master of the Palmerston Street Church, Sugden discovered the singer, Florence Austral, then Florence Fawaz. From 1904 to 1912 he was musical critic for The Argus and The Australasian. Sugden was president of the Melbourne Shakespeare Society in 1914–1915.

Sugden was a trustee of the Public Library, museums, and National Gallery of Victoria in 1902, was elected vice-president in 1928, and president in 1933–35. Sugden had little knowledge of art, but took much interest in the books committee work. Sugden was first chairman of Melbourne University Press, 1922–25.

Sugden did a considerable amount of writing during his life. Before leaving England he had done voluntary work for volume I of the Oxford English Dictionary. In 1893 appeared Comedies of T. Maccius Plautus, translated in the original metres. This was followed by Miles Gloriosus, by T. Maccius Plautus, translated in the original metres (1912), The Psalms of David, translated into English verse (1924), A Topographical Dictionary to the Works of Shakespeare and his Fellow Dramatists (1925), Israel's Debt to Egypt, Fernley lecture (1928), John Wesley's London (1932). He wrote "Part I. The Private Life" in George Swinburne, A Biography (1931), contributed a chapter on the "Settlement of Tasmania and Victoria" in A Century in the Pacific (1914), and one "In Australasia" for A New History of Methodism, 1909. Sugden also prepared Festal Songs for Sunday School Anniversaries in five series, and in 1921 edited with notes Wesley's Standard Sermons in two volumes. There were several other studies and addresses published as pamphlets.

== Late life and legacy ==
Sugden preached his last sermon in 1933, but until a few weeks before the end, was able to attend most meetings of the trustees of the public library. When in 1934 the trustees were entertaining Masefield, the poet assisted his host to his feet, and Sugden with characteristic wit remarked, "Well, that is not the first uplift I have received from John Masefield." Sugden was confined to his room when the Queen's College students serenaded him for the last time on his eighty-first birthday, and he died about a month later on 22 July 1935 at his home in Hawthorn. Sugden received the degree of Litt. D. from the University of Melbourne by thesis in 1918.

There is a memorial window to Dr. and Mrs. Sugden in Queen's College chapel, and a portrait of Sugden by Charles Wheeler is in the National Gallery of Victoria. He was survived by three daughters of each marriage.

Sugden was a large man who had a charming smile. Sugden showed courage in writing to the press taking the side of Marshall Hall who had offended the churches with one of his publications.
