= Bourke Street =

Street in Melbourne, Australia

Bourke Street Victoria
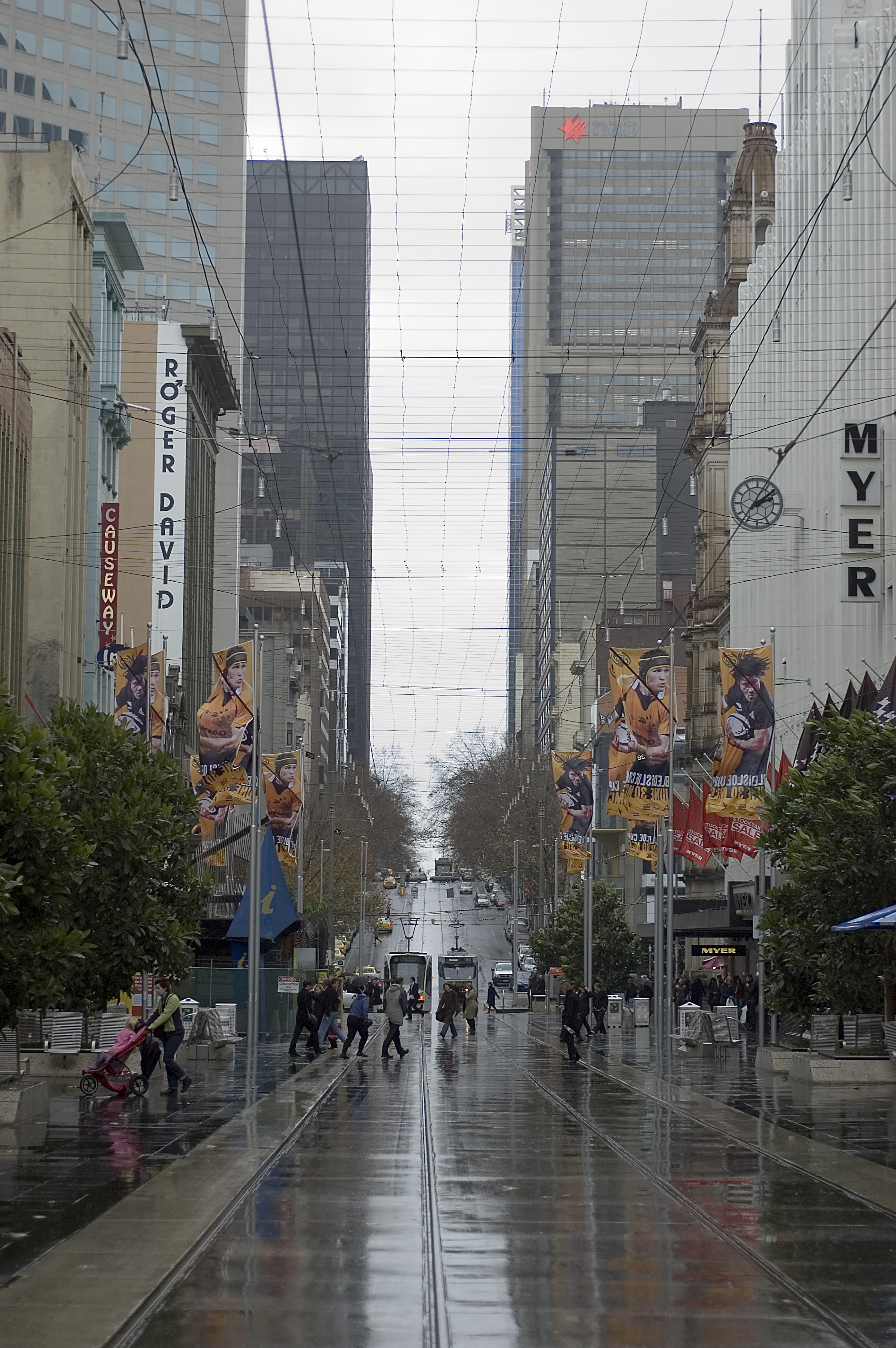
- Bourke Street Mall, between Swanston Street and Elizabeth Street looking west, June 2007
- Coordinates: 37.8139°S 144.96452°E

General information
- Type: Street
- Length: 3 km (1.9 mi)

Major junctions
- West end: Collins Street; Docklands, Melbourne
- Harbour Esplanade; Spencer Street; King Street; William Street; Queen Street; Elizabeth Street; Swanston Street; Russell Street; Exhibition Street
- East end: Spring Street; Melbourne CBD

Location(s)
- LGA(s): City of Melbourne
- Suburb(s): Docklands, Melbourne CBD

Bourke Street is one of the main streets in the Melbourne central business district and a core feature of the Hoddle Grid. It was traditionally the entertainment hub of inner-city Melbourne, and is now also a popular tourist destination and tram thoroughfare.

During the Marvellous Melbourne era, Bourke Street was the location of many of the city's theatres and cinemas. Today it continues as a major retail shopping precinct with the Bourke Street Mall running between Elizabeth and Swanston Streets, numerous offices to the west end and restaurants to the east. Its liveliness and activity has often been contrasted with the sobering formality of nearby Collins Street. For this reason, "Busier than Bourke Street" is a popular colloquialism denoting a crowded or busy environment.

Bourke Street is named for Irish-born British Army officer Sir Richard Bourke, who served as the Governor of New South Wales from 1831 and 1837 during the drafting of the Hoddle Grid.

== Geography ==
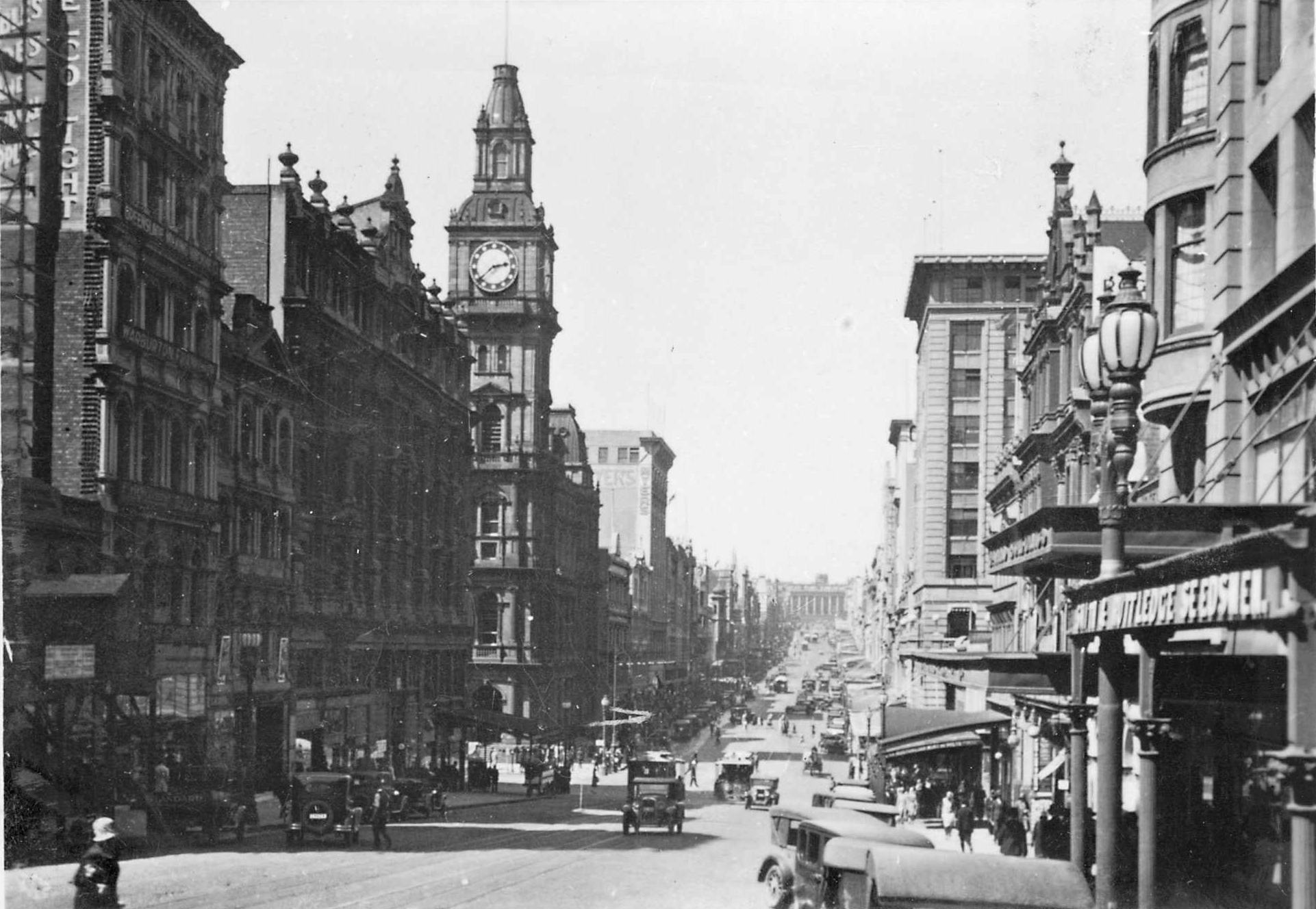
Easterly view of Bourke Street, towards the Elizabeth Street intersection, c. 1935

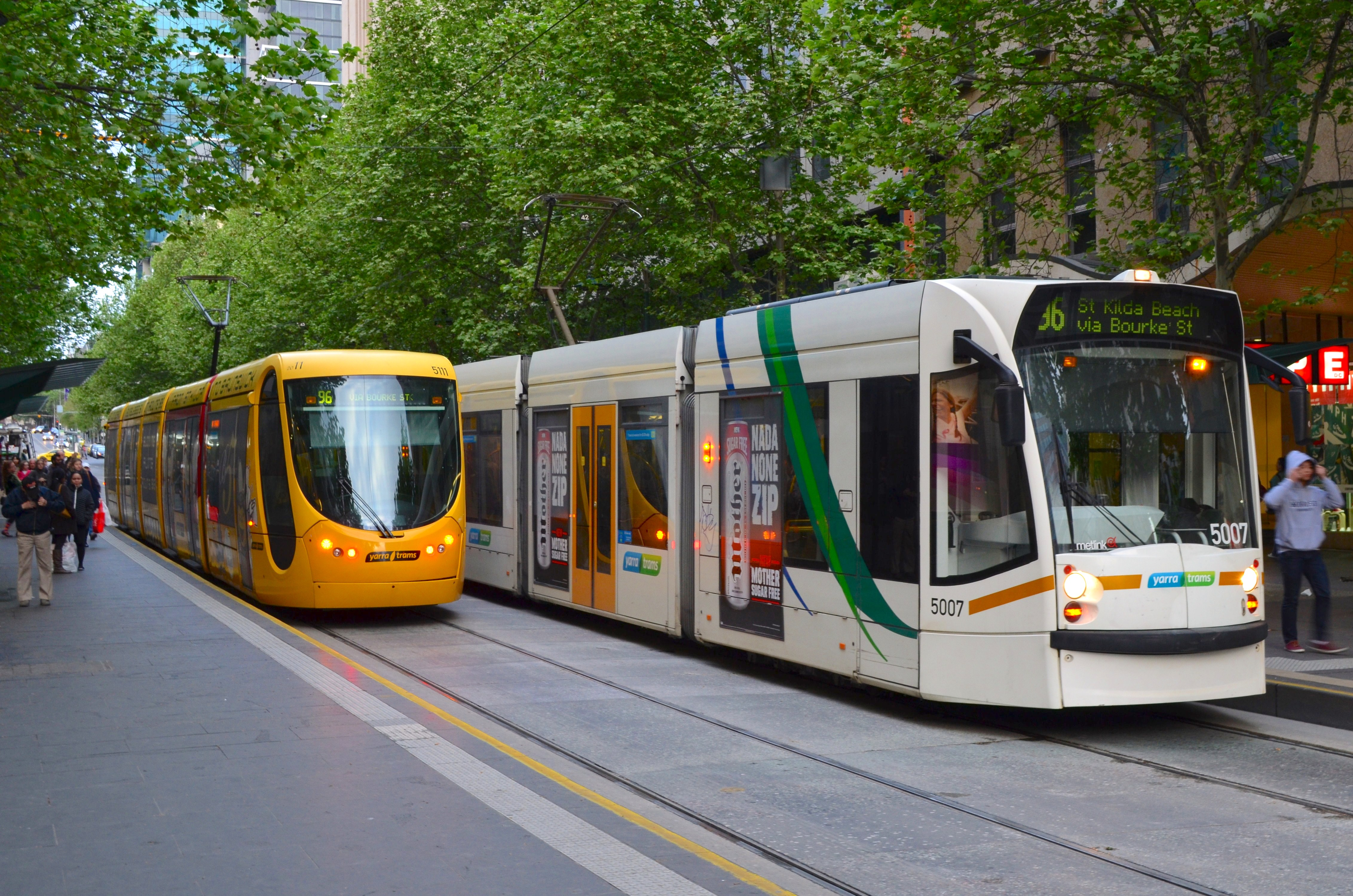
Route 96 trams on Bourke Street, October 2012.

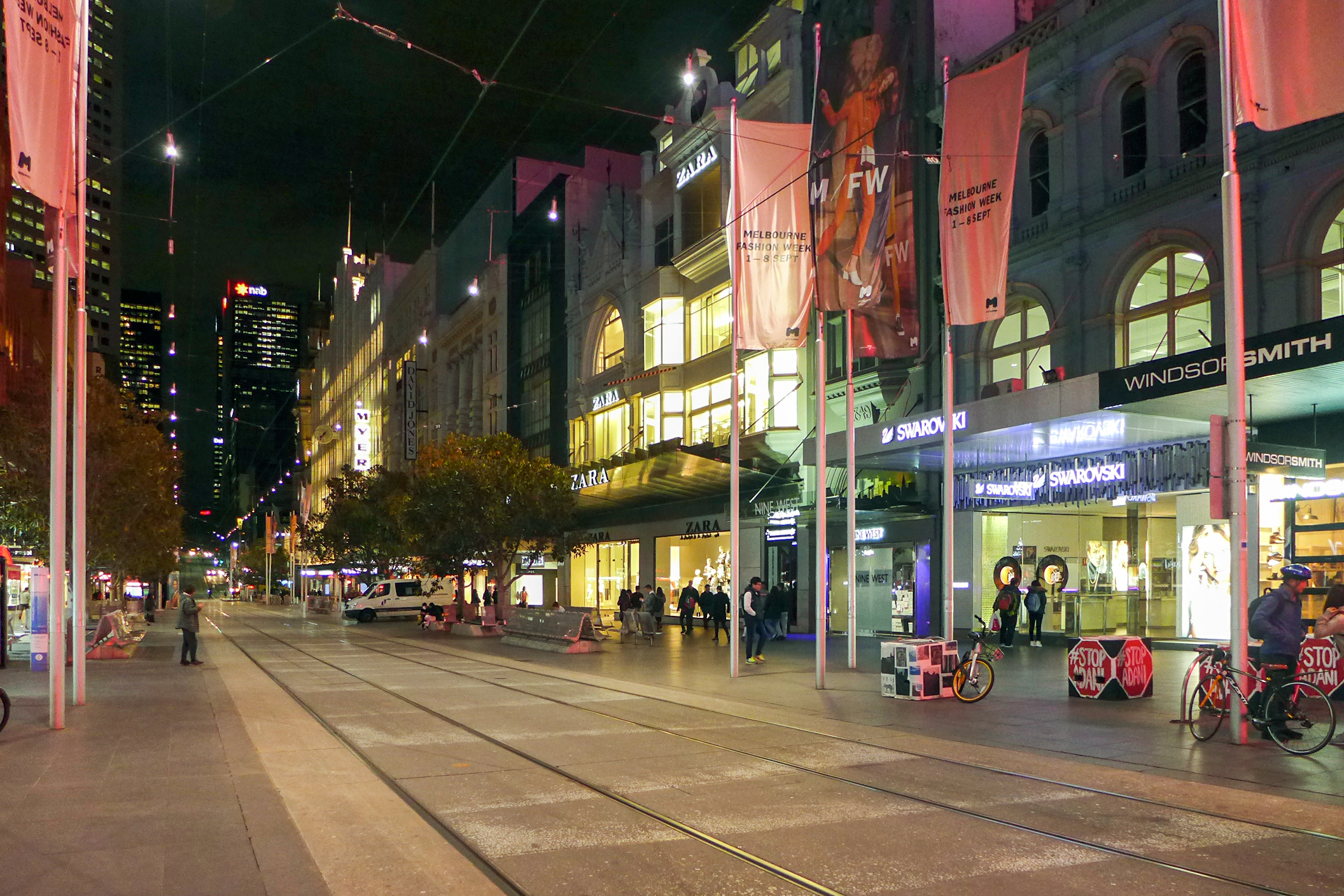
Bourke Street at night, August 2017.

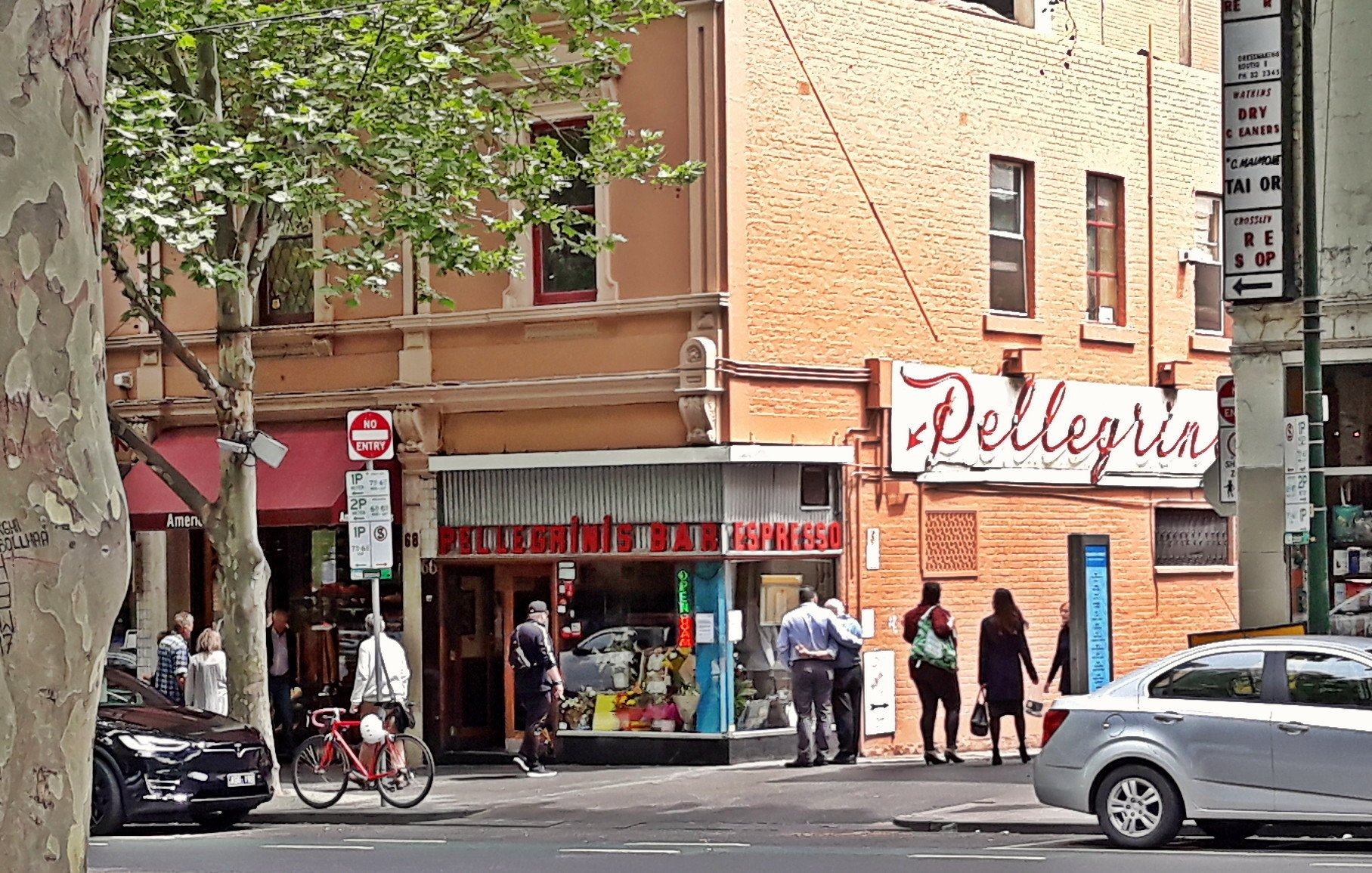
Pellegrini's cafe, November 2018.

Bourke Street runs roughly from east to west and bisects the city centre along its long axis. Bourke Street runs parallel between Little Collins Street to the south and Little Bourke Street to the north.

There are two primary stretches of Bourke Street, split by Southern Cross station: the historic city centre and the modern Docklands precinct. The city centre portion runs from Spring Street in the east (overlooked by Parliament House) to Spencer Street and Southern Cross station. The newer Docklands end continues on the other side of the station (which is only accessible to pedestrians) and finishes at its intersection with Collins Street further west.

== History ==
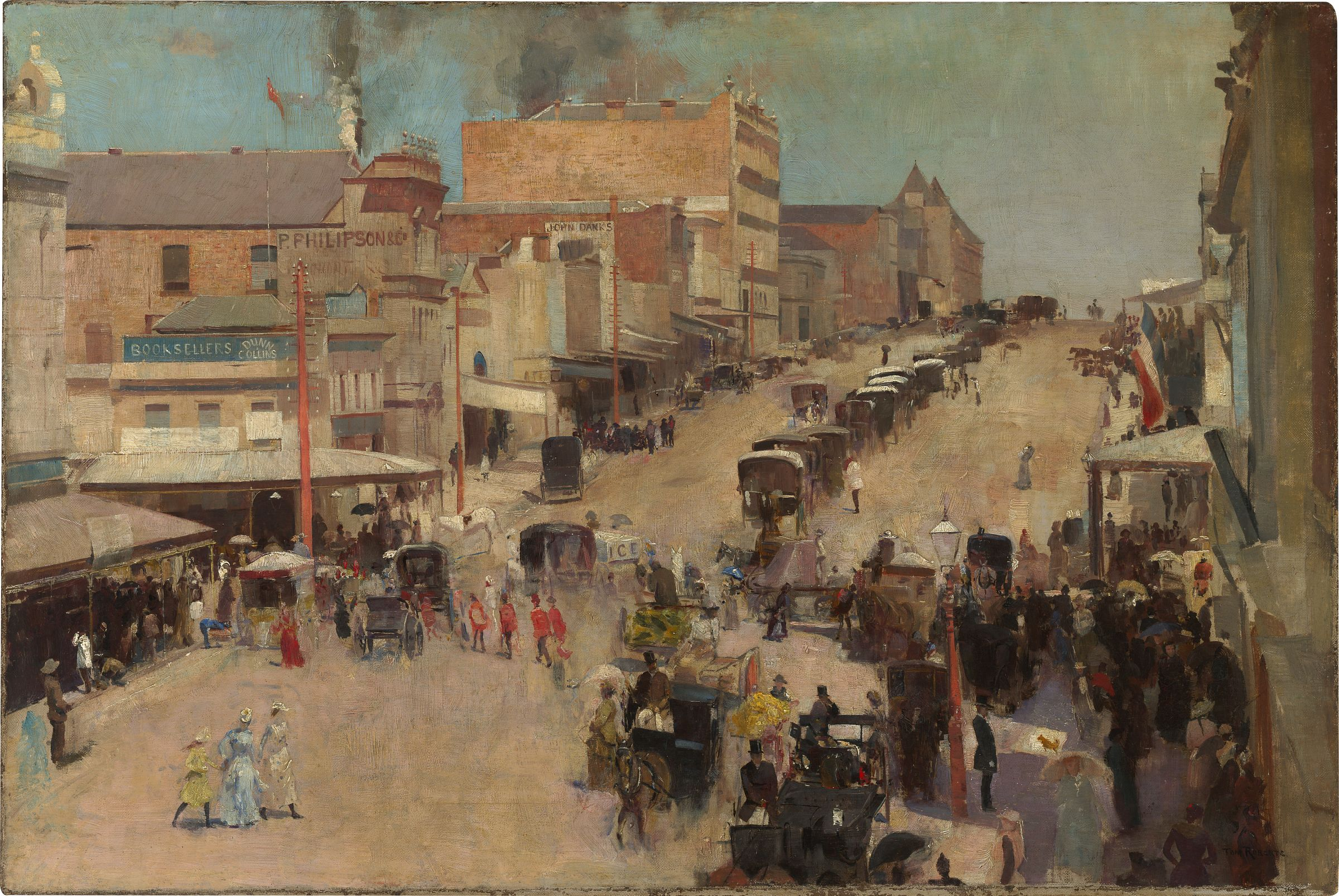
Bourke Street (1886) by Tom Roberts, oil on canvas on composition board.

Having been laid out as part of the Hoddle Grid in 1837, Bourke Street was considered "out of town" until the 1840s when the western end saw the opening of St Patrick's Hall, the first synagogue and the first public hospital. During the 1850s it gained a reputation as a busy thoroughfare popular as the centre for Saturday nightlife. As retail presence increased with department store Buckley & Nunn opening a succession of buildings in 1851 and rival Myer in 1911, the street was often compared to London's Oxford Street.

Melbourne's first theatre opened on Bourke Street as the Pavilion (1841), and by the late 1840s the east end was established as Melbourne's main entertainment zone. Theatres and public halls were complemented by billiard halls, cigar divans, rifle galleries, bowling alleys and sideshows. While the early evening crowd trod Bourke Street's pavements for entertainment or for show, the night-time street was also notorious for public disorder, fights, brothel touts and drinking and drunkenness.

Cheap restaurants appeared from the 1870s, when Parer's Hotel and Crystal Tea Rooms became a Melbourne institution, while the Café de Paris was a favourite literary and artistic meeting place. Ellis Bird's Books opened in 1925 at number 21 and Margaret Bird and her husband built up a haven for the literati for 30 years. Twentieth-century restaurants such as Florentino's, Pellegrini's and the Society Café have become Melbourne institutions.

The late 20th century onwards has resulted in office block developments, residential skyscrapers, the introduction of several shopping arcades and the Bourke Street Mall.

== Mall ==
The Bourke Street Mall is a pedestrian and tram-only strip running between Swanston and Elizabeth Streets. The mall is Bourke Street's most famous feature and contains retail hubs like Melbourne's GPO, H&M, Zara, Cotton On, TK Maxx and the flagship stores of Myer, David Jones and Mecca.

Concepts for a Bourke Street Mall were drawn up as early as 1964 by Robin Boyd and Frederick Romberg however the ambitious multi-platform design which separated cars from pedestrians was never realised. Plans were eventually scaled down with pedestrians sharing space with a grade level tramline. Vehicular traffic was removed from the section on 13 February 1978. The pedestrian mall was officially opened in 1983 by Charles, Prince of Wales and Diana, Princess of Wales.

The mall received a major facelift in preparation for the 2006 Commonwealth Games and elevated tram super-stops were later installed.

In the January 2017 Melbourne car attack, a mentally ill person driving a sedan being pursued by the police deliberately drove the vehicle onto the footpath and ran over innocent bystanders at Bourke Street Mall. The crime claimed the lives of six people, including one baby and one child. Over twenty-five victims were hospitalised with injuries.

The 2018 Melbourne stabbing attack also took place near the Target Centre on Bourke Street. An ISIS inspired male set fire to his ute before exiting the vehicle and stabbing three bystanders. Two victims were hospitalised and one died. Police attended the scene within one minute of the car fire and shot the offender, who later died in hospital.

In September 2023, Zain Khan drove through a tram stop, hitting three bystanders before crashing into two cars at the Bourke/Russell Street Intersection. A 76-year-old man was killed and five other people were injured in the alleged rampage. Khan plead not guilty at his trial.

== Arcades ==
Many of Melbourne's famous arcades and shopping centres connect to Bourke Street, including:

- Melbourne's GPO, the former General Post Office, a boutique shopping arcade from 2004 until clothing company H&M took over as key tenant in 2014
- Royal Arcade, a heritage shopping arcade from 1869
- Strand Arcade
- Midcity Arcade
- Kmart Centre, formally Target Centre
- Melbourne Walk
- Centrepoint Shopping Centre presently (2024) largely empty in readiness for redevelopment.

== Events ==
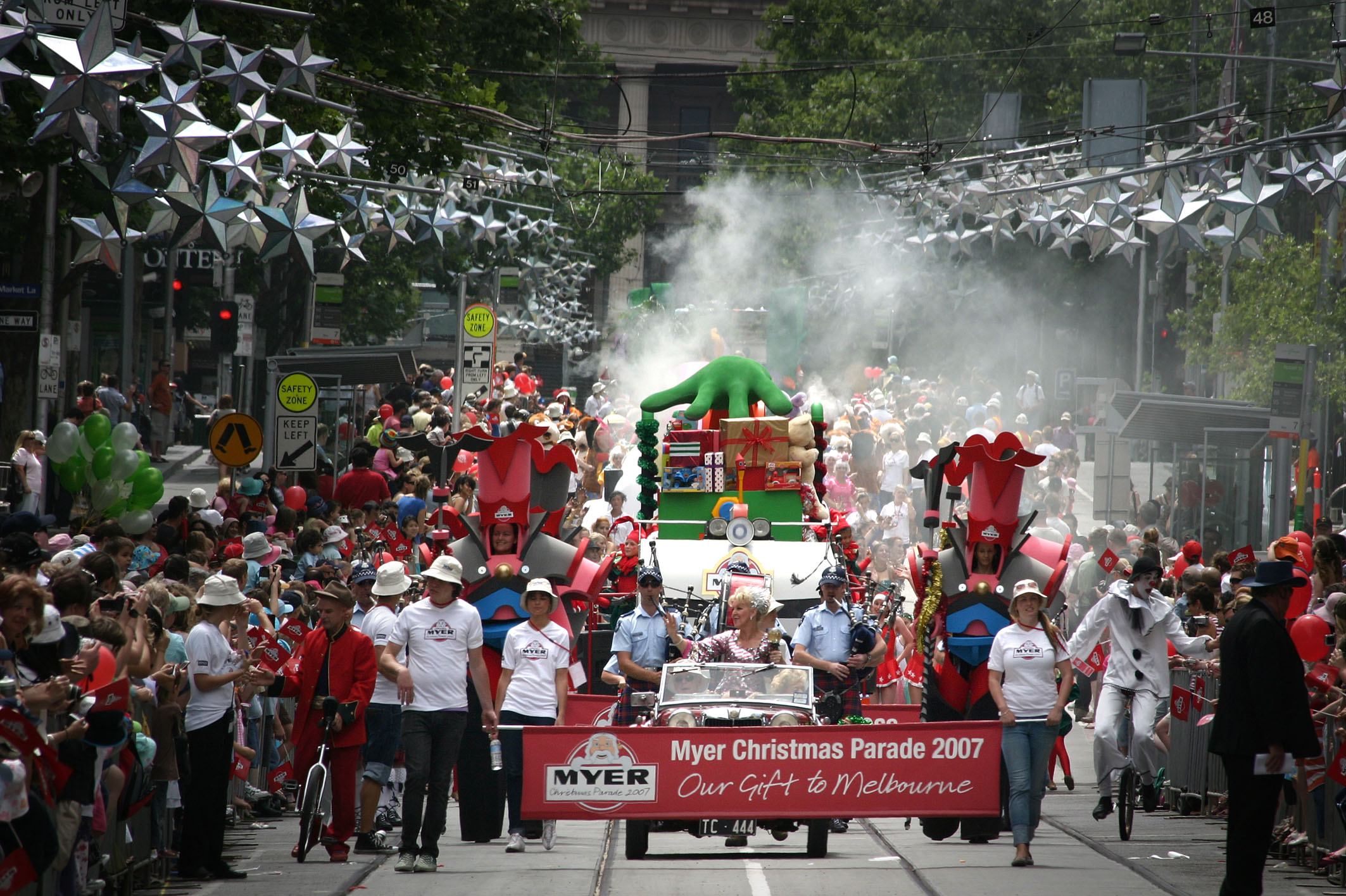
Myer Christmas Parade (2007)

The inaugural Myer Christmas Window display was in 1956, the year of the 1956 Melbourne Summer Olympics and became an annual tradition. Myer's shopfront windows are decorated in a different Christmas-themed display and are visited by around 1,000,000 children and their parents each December. The Myer Christmas Parade was an annual parade running down Bourke Street from Spring Street to the Myer windows. The parade was last held in 2010.

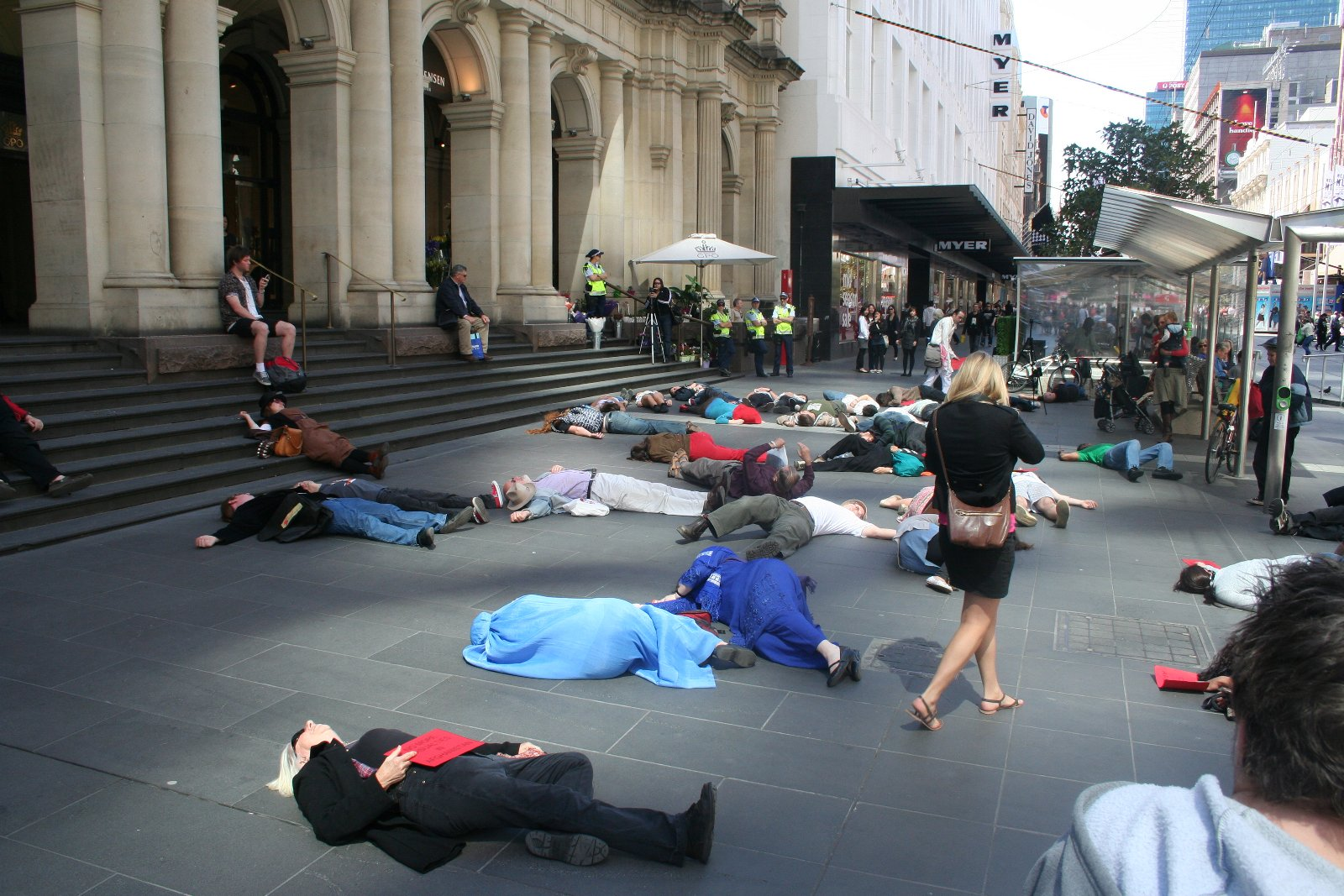
Flashmob die-in protest in 2010 on the ninth anniversary of the Afghanistan War

== Skyscrapers ==
Bourke Street is a commercial zone lined by glass-paned skyscrapers, especially at its west end. Prominent skyscrapers include the National Australia Bank headquarters at 395 and 700 Bourke, 385 Bourke Street, Bourke Place, UniSuper, Marland House, National Bank House at 500 Bourke (former headquarters of NAB), AMP Square, Coles Group at 720 Bourke, CommBank at 435 Bourke, Channel Nine Melbourne and AGL Energy (atop Southern Cross station).

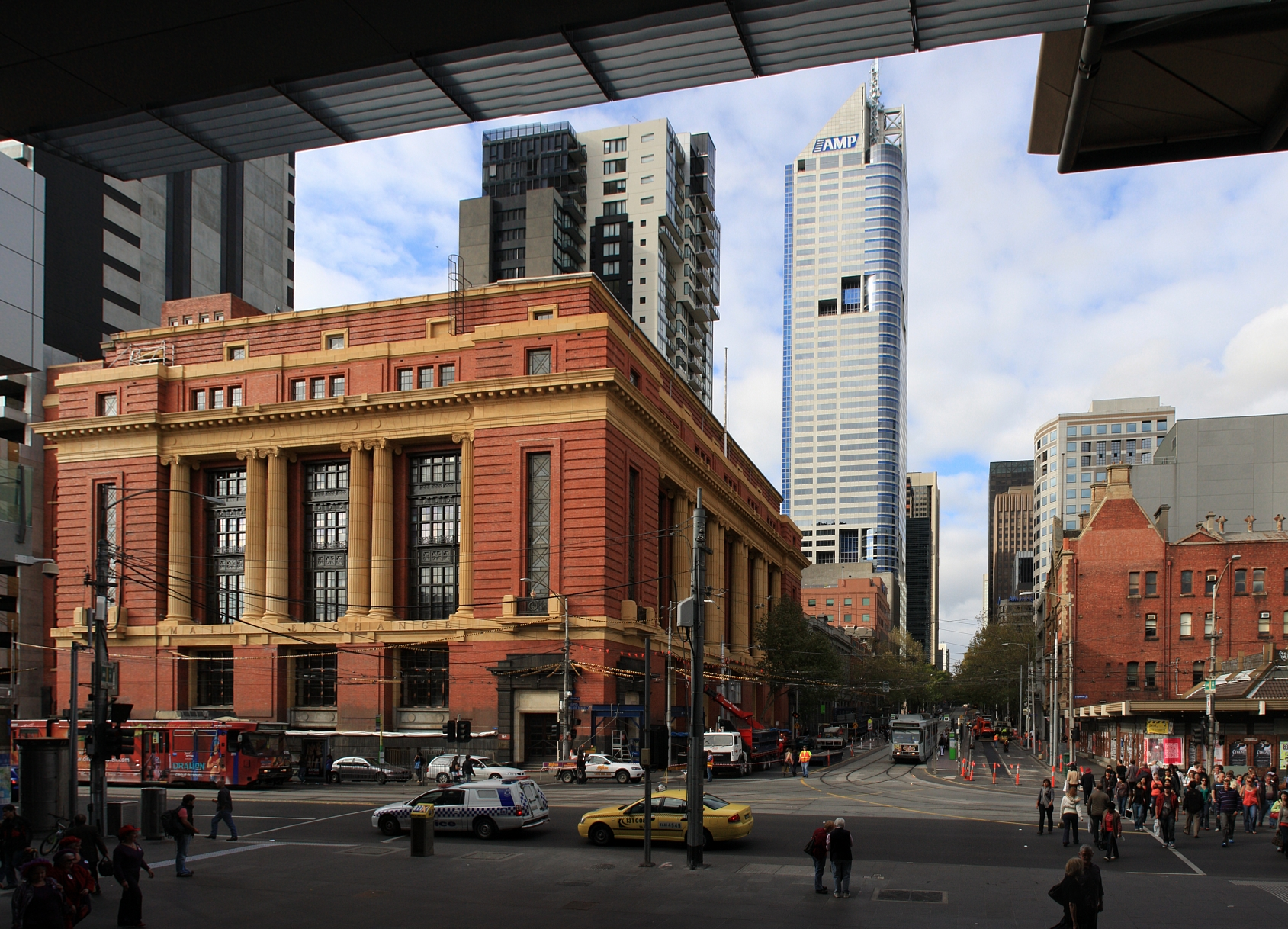
Bourke Street from Southern Cross station

== Transportation ==
In August 1887 the Melbourne Tramway & Omnibus Company commenced operating a cable tramway from Spencer Street to Clifton Hill along Bourke Street. It closed in October 1940 with buses introduced. In June 1955 the Melbourne & Metropolitan Tramways Board replaced the buses with electric trams. Today, tram routes 86 and 96 travel the length of Bourke Street and directly through the mall.

Parliament railway station is located at the eastern end of Bourke Street near the corner of Spring Street and is part of the underground City Loop for the suburban rail network.

Southern Cross station bisects Bourke Street at the city centre's west end and is a major transport hub for train and bus services throughout Victoria. The station also has shuttle buses to Melbourne and Avalon Airports. A pedestrian bridge at Southern Cross station provides access from Bourke Street to Docklands Stadium and Melbourne Docklands.

== Cinemas ==
Bourke Street has played a historically significant part in Melbourne's cinema industry. It was home to the city's first permanent cinema (although this was initially established near Princes Bridge), and by 1913 had developed into Melbourne's principal cinema precinct. In 1908, Arthur Russell began screening films at St. George's Hall, which was rebuilt as Hoyt's De Luxe Theatre in 1914, marking the beginning of the Hoyts cinema chain.

Bourke Street remained a centre for cinema-goers until quite recently. In 2005, the Hoyts cinema moved to larger premises at the Melbourne Central Shopping Centre. On 15 February 2006 the Village cinema closed down, leaving Village cinemas at nearby Crown Casino as the main Village branded city cinemas. The Chinatown Cinema, which inhabits the former Hoyts MidCity cinema, is the only cinema left in Bourke Street. On nearby Collins Street, the newly expanded Kino Dendy cinemas continues to be a cinema drawcard. The adjacent Russell Street Greater Union cinemas closed in 2013 and has since been demolished.

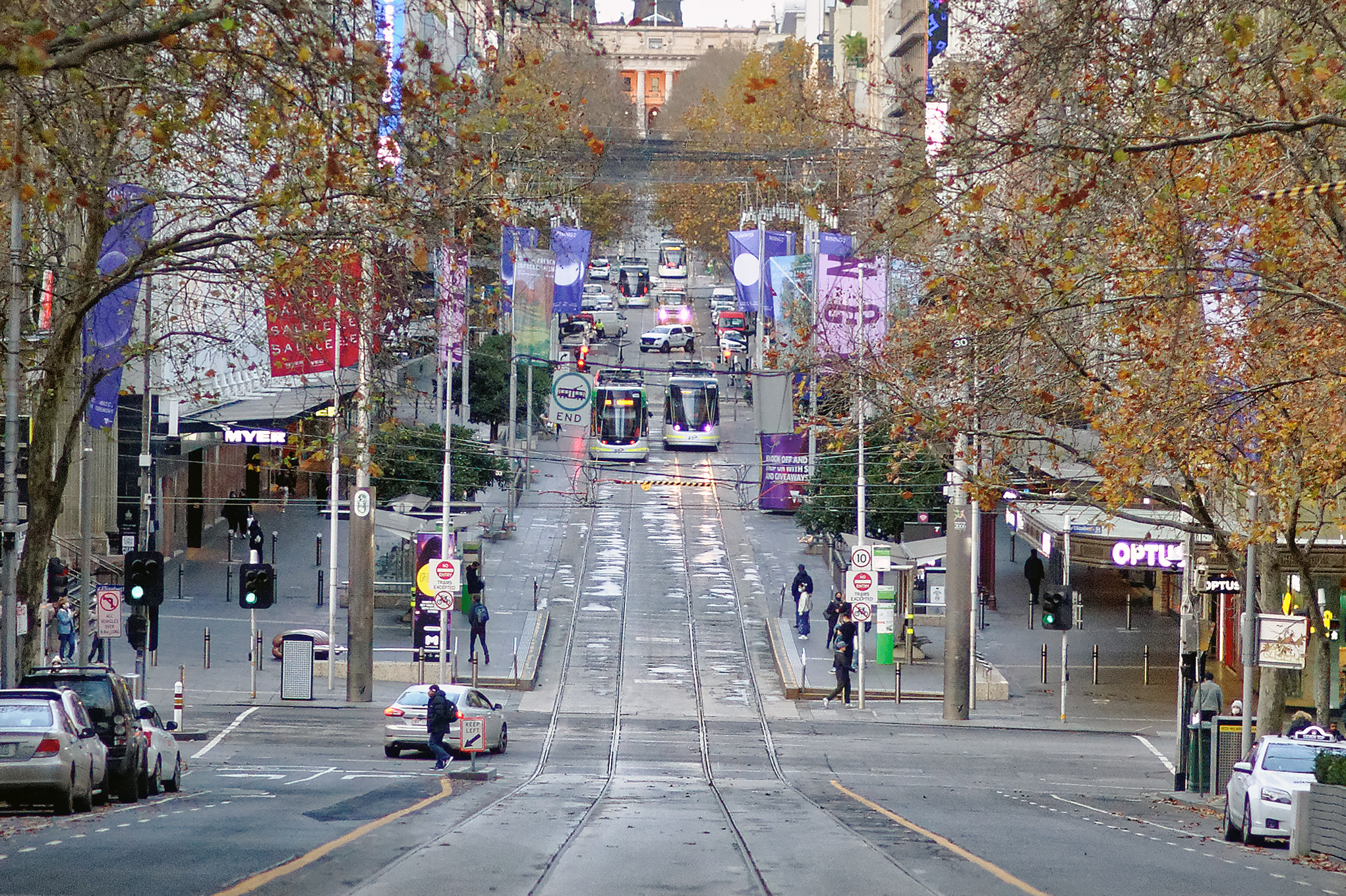
Bourke Street Melbourne 4 June 2021 during the COVID-19 lockdown
