= T. L. Bright =

Journalist in England and Australia

Thomas Lockyer Bright (1818 – 16 May 1874), invariably referred to as T. L. Bright, was a journalist in Australia.

Bright was born in Bristol and in 1847 was a sub-editor of The Wesleyen Times in London.

He arrived in Melbourne in 1848, and was engaged on the staff of the Argus, and subsequently of The Age. He was also connected with The Express, a semi-weekly journal, and The Examiner, of which he was the first editor.

He founded a literary magazine My Notebook, whose first issue was published in December 1856 and closed in May 1859. A feature of the magazine was theatre reviews contributed by James Edward Neild as "Christopher Sly". It is likely he was the critic whose name was removed from the free list of the Princess's Theatre after a negative criticism, and retaliated in the pages of The Argus.

The proprietors of the Argus launched The Examiner in 1857, with Bright as its first editor, and for which Neild contributed theatre criticism. Ultimately the Examiner, the Yeoman, and the Weekly Argus were in 1864 merged to form The Australasian weekly, for which Neild was theatre critic, writing as "Jaques", and later as "Tahite".

Around 1866 he left for New Zealand, where he was associated with the Otago Daily Times. He returned to Melbourne around January 1869 in poor health, both physically and mentally, and was admitted to the Lunatic Asylum.

Bright was correspondent for newspapers in Sydney and Hobart, also Dunedin and Invercargill in New Zealand, and for the last two years of his life he edited The Evening Star at Sandhurst (Bendigo). He was taken ill to the Bendigo Hospital on Thursday evening, and died rather suddenly on Saturday morning.
