= Murray Valley Highway =

Highway in Victoria and New South Wales

Murray Valley Highway New South Wales–Victoria
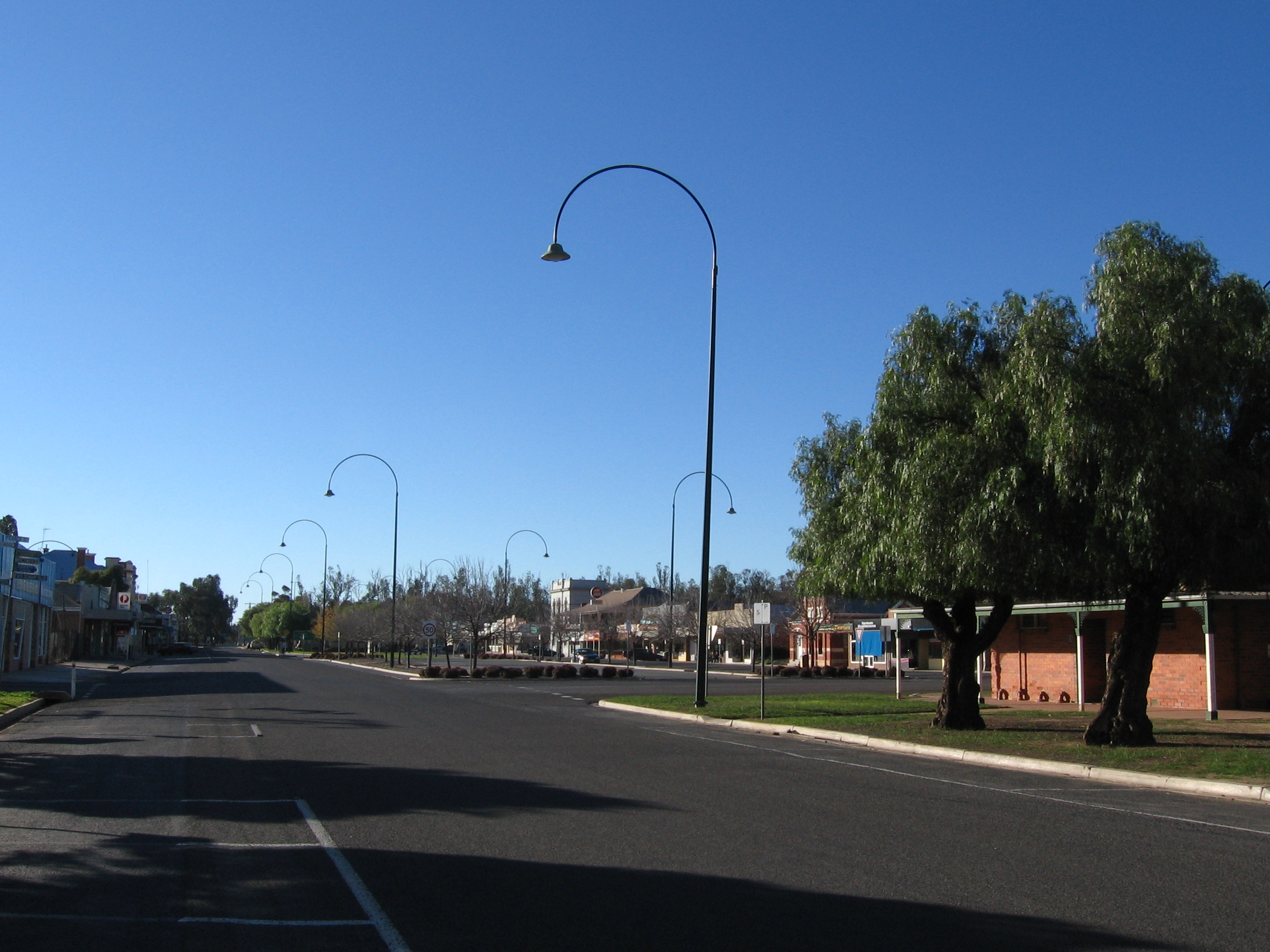
- Murray Valley Highway at Nathalia
- Coordinates: 34.557657°S 142.757204°E (Northwest end); 36.169150°S 148.024968°E (Southeast end)

General information
- Type: Highway
- Length: 663 km (412 mi)
- Gazetted: November 1914 (as Main Road); September 1932 (as State Highway)
- Route number(s): B400 (1997–present) (Robinvale–Corryong); Concurrencies: B12 (1997–present) (through Piangil); A39 (2013–present) (Strathmerton–Yarroweyah); B75 (1997–present) (through Echuca); M31 (2013–present) (Barnawatha North–Wodonga)
- Former route number: National Route 16 (1955–1997/2013) (VIC/NSW); Entire route

Major junctions
- Northwest end: Sturt Highway; Euston, New South Wales
- Mallee Highway; Loddon Valley Highway; Northern Highway; Goulburn Valley Highway; Hume Freeway; Kiewa Valley Highway; Omeo Highway
- Southeast end: Alpine Way; VIC/NSW border

Location(s)
- Region: Loddon Mallee, Hume
- Major settlements: Robinvale, Swan Hill, Kerang, Echuca, Yarrawonga, Rutherglen, Wodonga, Tallangatta

Highway system
- Highways in Australia; National Highway • Freeways in Australia; Highways in New South Wales; Highways in Victoria

Murray Valley Highway is a 663-kilometre (412 mi) rural highway located in Victoria (with a short western tail in New South Wales), Australia, between Euston, New South Wales and Corryong, Victoria. The popular tourist route mostly follows the southern bank of the Murray River and effectively acts as the northernmost highway in Victoria. For all but the western end's last three kilometres, the highway is allocated route B400.

== Route ==
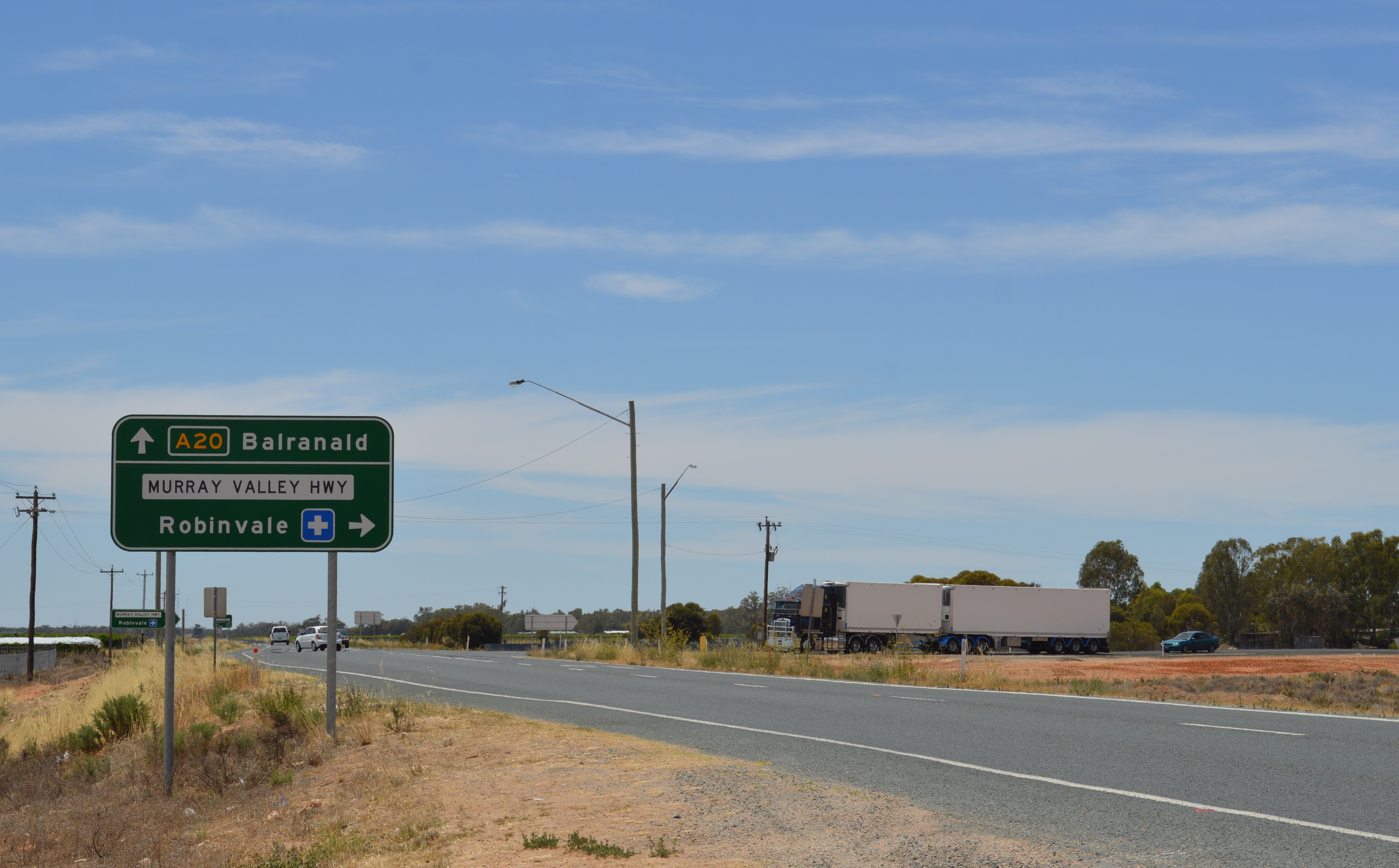
The western terminus of Murray Valley Highway at Euston, New South Wales.

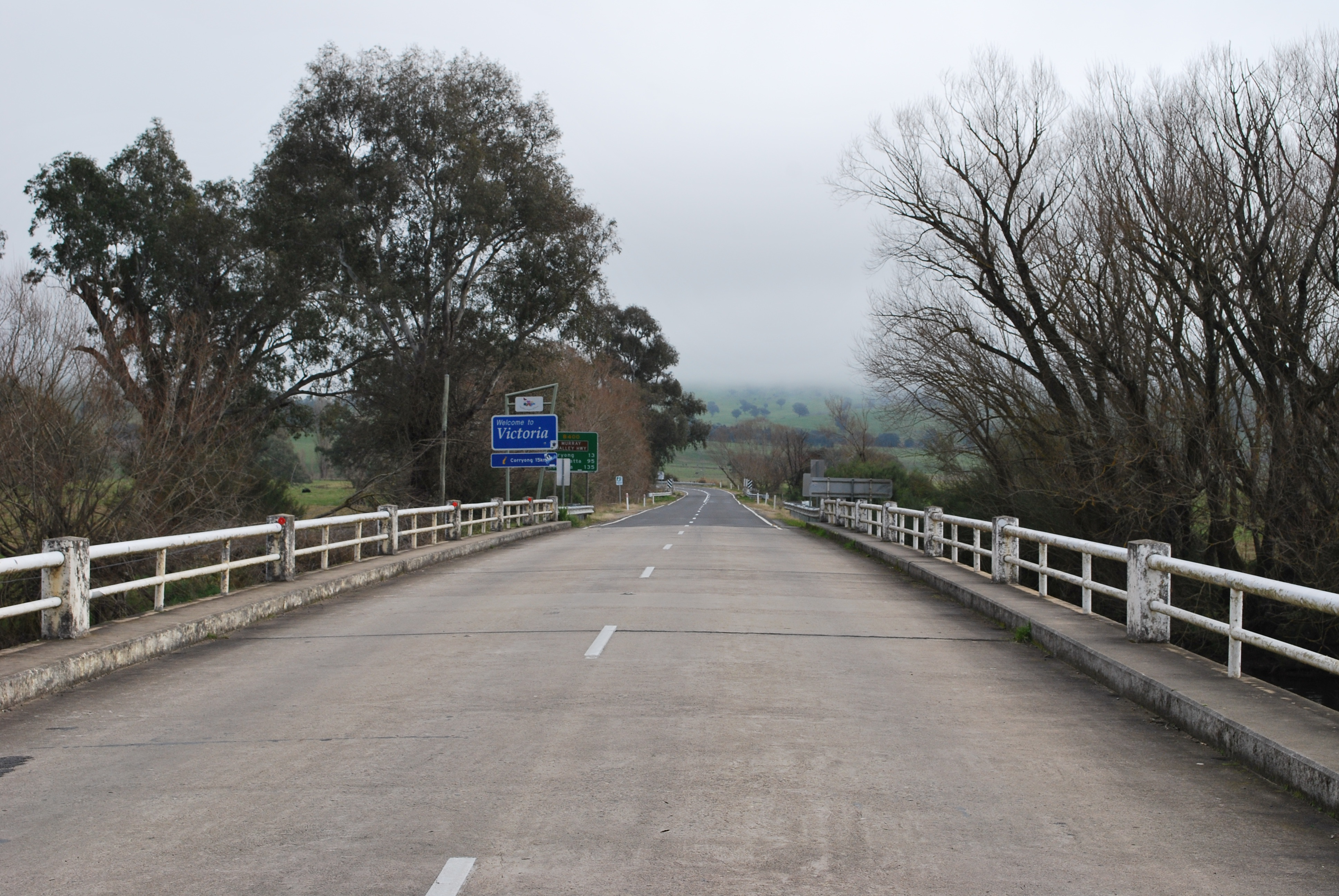
The eastern terminus of Murray Valley Highway at the Bringenbrong Bridge near Corryong, Victoria.

Murray Valley Highway commences at the intersection with Sturt Highway just outside Euston, New South Wales and heads south to cross the Murray River over the Robinvale-Euston bridge at Robinvale and into Victoria; the western end of route B400 starts here. The highway continues in a south-easterly direction, tracking close to the southern bank of the Murray River for the majority of its length through the towns of Swan Hill, Kerang, Cohuna, Echuca, Nathalia, Strathmerton, Cobram, Yarrawonga and Rutherglen, until it reaches Wodonga, before heading in an easterly direction via Tallangatta until it eventually terminates at the foothills of the Great Dividing Range at Corryong; the road beyond crosses the border east into New South Wales as Alpine Way, to eventually reach Khancoban and Jindabyne.

Most of the highway is fairly straight and flat, much of it through irrigated farmland. It becomes hillier and more winding east of Wodonga, with a moderately steep mountain pass near Shelley, midway between Tallangatta and Corryong.

== History ==
Within Victoria, the passing of the Country Roads Act 1912 through the Parliament of Victoria provided for the establishment of the Country Roads Board (later VicRoads) and their ability to declare Main Roads, taking responsibility for the management, construction and care of the state's major roads from local municipalities. Murray (River) Valley Road was declared a Main Road on 30 November 1914, from Bonegilla over Sandy Creek (later to become Lake Hume), through Bethanga and Granya, following the course of the Murray River, to Burrowye; Kyabram-Nathalia Road from Wyuna to Nathalia (and continuing south to Kyabram), (Lake Boga-) Swan Hill Road from Lake Boga to Swan Hill, (Swan Hill-) Euston Road from Swan Hill through Nyah and Piangil to the punt over the Murray River to Euston, Yarrawonga-Cobram Road from Yarrawonga to Cobram, Cobram-Strathmerton Road from Cobram to Strathmerton, and Wangaratta-Yarrawonga Road between Bundalong and Yarrawonga (and continuing south to Wangaratta), were declared Main Roads on 17 March 1915; Rutherglen-Wodonga Road between Yarrawonga and Wodonga) was declared a Main Road on 28 May 1915; and Murray Valley Road between Nathalian and Strathmerton was declared a Main Road on 28 June 1926. Further sections were declared or built in the late 1920s and early 1930s by the Country Roads Board as part of a program of rural roads to facilitate development of the more remote parts of the state and provide connections between communities in addition to the roads and railways radiating out from Melbourne. Parts of the route included a stretch of newly-constructed road between Mildura and the South Australian border, opened in 1927.

The passing of the Developmental Roads Act 1918 allowed the Country Road Board to declare Developmental Roads, serving to develop any area of land by providing access to a railway station for primary producers. Murray River Valley Road between Merbein and the state border with South Australia was declared a Developmental Road on 7 February 1927. The eastern end of the road was re-aligned to run from Bethangra and Talgarno to Tallangatta and Bullioh, to accommodate the opening of Hume Dam and the filling of Lake Hume.

The passing of the Highways and Vehicles Act 1924 provided for the declaration of State Highways, roads two-thirds financed by the state government through the Country Roads Board. Murray Valley Highway was declared a State Highway in September 1932, cobbled from a collection of existing and newly constructed roads running along the southern bank of the Murray River from Corryong through Walwa, Wodonga, Rutherglen, Yarrawonga, Cobram, Echuca, Swan Hill and Bannerton to the intersection with Calder Highway in Hattah, and again from Mildura to the state border with South Australia (for a total of 513 miles), subsuming the original declarations of Murray River Valley Road, Ruthergen-Wodonga Road, Wangaratta-Yarrawonga Road (between Bundalong and Yarrawonga), Yarrawonga-Cobram Road, Cobram-Strathmerton Road, Kyabram-Nathalia Road (between Nathalia and Wyuna), Lake Boga-Swan Hill Road, and Swan Hill-Euston Road (between Swan Hill and Lake Powell) as Main Roads, and Murray River Valley Road as a Developmental Road; this also subsumed a section of Omeo Highway between Tallangatta and Wodonga, with the northern end of Omeo Highway truncated to meet Murray Valley Highway in Tallangatta as a result.

Sturt Highway was rerouted to reach Renmark through Victoria instead of via Wentworth in 1939, subsuming the alignment of Murray Valley Highway between Mildura and the state border with South Australia; Murray Valley Highway was subsequently truncated to terminate at Calder Highway in Hattah. Robinvale Road, connecting the "irrigation settlement of Robinvale" to the highway, was declared a Main Road when it was surfaced for the first time in 1952, and later declared a State Highway as Robinvale Highway on 9 May 1983, between Robinvale and Lake Powell.

The alignment was further altered at both ends in 1990:

- its western end, running from Lake Powell via Bannerton to Hattah, was re-aligned to run through Robinvale along Robinvale Highway instead, subsuming it to terminate just outside Euston, New South Wales in May 1990; the former alignment is now known as Hattah-Robinvale Road (signed route C252 in 1998).
- its eastern end, running through Thologolong, Walwa and Towong, was re-aligned to run along the more-direct, present-day route to Corryong (at the time named Tallangatta-Corryong Road) in June 1990; the former alignment is now known as Murray River Road (signed route C546 in 1998).

The passing of the Road Management Act 2004 granted the responsibility of overall management and development of Victoria's major arterial roads to VicRoads: in 2004, VicRoads re-declared the road as Murray Valley Highway (Arterial #6570), beginning at the New South Wales border at Robinvale and ending at the New South Wales border in Towong Upper.

The passing of the Main Roads (Amendment) Act of 1929 (which amended the original Main Roads Act of 1924) through the Parliament of New South Wales on 8 April 1929 provided for the declaration of State Highways, Trunk Roads and Main Roads, partially funded by the New South Wales' state government through the Main Roads Board (later Transport for NSW). Main Road 583 was declared on 17 June 1959, from the intersection with State Highway 14 (Sturt Highway) at Euston to the state border with Victoria north of Robinvale; this declaration as a Main Road did not change when the road on the Victorian side of the bridge was declared a State Highway (as Robinvale Highway in 1983 and then Murray Valley Highway in 1990), despite adopting its name as Murray Valley Highway from the Victorian side of the road to remain contiguous. The road today, as Main Road 583, still retains this declaration.

Murray Valley Highway was signed National Route 16 across its entire length in 1955. With Victoria's conversion to the newer alphanumeric system in the late 1990s, its former route number was replaced by route B400 for the highway within Victoria; the New South Wales section was left signed as National Route 16 until switching to their alphanumeric system in 2013, after which it was left unallocated.

== Upgrades ==
Major roadworks have taken place in the 2010s and 2020s around Echuca and Moama and are continuing. The project is being built in four stages:

- Stage 1: Upgrade of the Murray Valley Highway and Warren Street intersection, completed in mid-2018
- Stage 2: Warren Street upgrade, completed November 2019
- Stage 3: Construction of new bridges over the Campaspe and Murray Rivers, major works started in March 2020
- Stage 4: Intersection upgrades to the Cobb Highway, Meninya Street and Perricoota Road intersection (to be delivered by Transport for NSW), works started in March 2020.

The project was completed in 2022.

== Major intersections and towns ==
State	LGA	Location	km	mi	Destinations	Notes
New South Wales	Balranald	Euston	0.0	0.0	Sturt Highway (A20) – Renmark, Mildura, Balranald, Hay	Western terminus of Murray Valley Highway at T-intersection
New South Wales	River Murray		3	1.9	Robinvale–Euston Bridge	
State border			4	2.5	New South Wales – Victoria state border	
Victoria	Swan Hill	Robinvale	4	2.5	Murray Valley Highway	Western terminus of route B400
Victoria	Swan Hill	Robinvale	6	3.7	Robinvale–Sea Lake Road (C251) – Manangatang, Sea Lake	
Victoria	Swan Hill	Tol Tol	25	16	Hattah–Robinvale Road (C252) – Hattah	T-intersection
Victoria	Swan Hill	Piangil	93	58	Tooleybuc Road (Mallee Highway) (B12 east) – Tooleybuc, Balranald, Sydney	Concurrency with route B12
Victoria	Swan Hill	Piangil	95	59	Mallee Highway (B12 west) – Ouyen, Adelaide	Concurrency with route B12
Victoria	Swan Hill	Nyah	110	68	Speewah Road – Koraleigh	
Victoria	Swan Hill	Swan Hill	135	84	Piangil railway line	
Victoria	Swan Hill	Swan Hill	137	85	Sea Lake–Swan Hill Road (C246 west) – Sea Lake, Hopetoun; McCallum Street (east) – Moulamein, Deniliquin	Roundabout
Victoria	Swan Hill	Castle Donnington	142	88	Donald–Swan Hill Road (C261) – Wycheproof, Donald	
Victoria	Swan Hill	Castle Donnington	146	91	Piangil railway line	
Victoria	Gannawarra	Kerang	190	120	Piangil railway line	
Victoria	Gannawarra	Kerang	194	121	Kerang–Quambatook Road (C262) – Quambatook, to Boort–Kerang Road (C266) – Boort	
Victoria	Loddon River		195	121	Patchell Bridge	
Victoria	Gannawarra	Kerang	196	122	Kerang–Koondrook Road (C264) – Koondrook, to Kerang–Murrabit Road (C263) – Murrabit	
Victoria	Gannawarra	Kerang	199	124	Loddon Valley Highway (B260) – Bendigo, Melbourne	
Victoria	Gannawarra	Kerang	200	120	Piangil railway line	
Victoria	Gannawarra	Cohuna	227	141	Cohuna–Koondrook Road (C265) – Koondrook, Barham	
Victoria	Gannawarra	Cohuna	228	142	Cohuna–Leitchville Road (C267) – Leitchville	
Victoria	Gannawarra	Leitchville	243	151	Kerang–Leitchville Road (C257) – Leitchville, Pyramid Hill	
Victoria	Campaspe	Echuca	289	180	Warren Street (C349) – Echuca, Moama	
Victoria	Campaspe	Echuca	291	181	Northern Highway (B75 south) – Rochester, Bendigo, Melbourne	Roundabout: western terminus of concurrency with route B75
Victoria	Campaspe River		291.5	181.1	Bridge over the river (bridge name unknown)	
Victoria	Campaspe	Echuca	292	181	Northern Highway (B75 north) – Echuca, Moama, Deniliquin	Eastern terminus of concurrency with route B75
Victoria	Campaspe	Echuca	292.5	181.8	Echuca railway line	
Victoria	Campaspe	Echuca	293	182	Echuca–Kyabram Road (C351) – Kyabram	
Victoria	Campaspe	Tongala	312	194	Kyabram–Tongala Road (C352) – Tongala, Kyabram	
Victoria	Campaspe	Wyuna	321	199	John Allen Road (C359) – Kyabram	
Victoria	Campaspe	Wyuna	325	202	Echuca–Mooroopna Road (C355) – Shepparton	
Victoria	Goulburn River		329	204	Bridge over the river (bridge name unknown)	
Victoria	Moira	Nathalia	344	214	Barmah–Shepparton Road (C358) – Shepparton, Barmah	
Victoria	Moira	Nathalia	347	216	Katamatite–Nathalia Road (C361) – Numurkah, Katamatite	
Victoria	Broken Creek		349	217	Bridge over the river (bridge name unknown)	
Victoria	Moira	Strathmerton	382	237	Goulburn Valley Highway (A39 south) – Numurkah, Shepparton, Melbourne	Western terminus of concurrency with route A39
Victoria	Moira	Strathmerton	387	240	Tocumwal railway line	
Victoria	Moira	Yarroweyah	396	246	Goulburn Valley Highway (A39 north) – Tocumwal, Dubbo, Brisbane	Eastern terminus of concurrency with route A39
Victoria	Moira	Cobram			Benalla–Tocumwal Road (C371) – Benalla	
Victoria	Moira	Cobram	400	250	Cobram South Road (C368) – Katamatite, Benalla	
Victoria	Moira	Cobram	409	254	Cobram–Koonoomoo Road (C367 northwest) – Cobram, Koonoomoo, Tocumwal; Broadway Street (Barooga–Cobram Road) (C370 northeast) – Cobram, Barooga	
Victoria	Yarrawonga Main Channel		437	272	Bridge over the channel (bridge name unknown)	
Victoria	Moira	Yarrawonga	437	272	Benalla–Yarrawonga Road (C373 south) – Benalla	Concurrency with route C373
Victoria	Moira	Yarrawonga	438	272	Belmore Street (C373 north) – Yarrawonga, Mulwala, Corowa	Concurrency with route C373
Victoria	Moira	Esmond	457	284	Wangaratta–Yarrawonga Road (C374) – Wangaratta	
Victoria	Ovens River		459	285	Parolas Bridge	
Victoria	Indigo	Rutherglen	480	300	Federation Way (C375) – Wangaratta, Corowa	
Victoria	Indigo	Rutherglen	484	301	Rutherglen–Wahgunyah Road (C376 north) – Wahgunyah, Corowa	Concurrency with route C376
Victoria	Indigo	Rutherglen	485	301	Chiltern–Rutherglen Road (C376 south) – Springhurst, Chiltern	Concurrency with route C376
Victoria	Indigo	Browns Plains	499	310	Chiltern–Howlong Road (C381) – Chiltern, Howlong	
Victoria	Indigo	Barnawartha	505	314	Barnawartha–Howlong Road (C378) – Howlong	
Victoria	Indigo	Barnawartha North	510.5	317.2	North East SG railway line	
Victoria	Indigo	Barnawartha North	511	318	Hume Freeway (M31) – Wangaratta, Melbourne	Trumpet interchange; western terminus of concurrency with route M31
Victoria	Wodonga	Wodonga	527	327	Bandiana Link Road (B400) – Bandiana, to Hume Freeway (M31) – Sydney	Diamond interchange; eastern terminus of concurrency with route M31
Victoria	Wodonga	Wodonga	527	327	Lincoln Causeway (C319) – Albury	
Victoria	Wodonga	Wodonga	528	328	Beechworth Road – Beechworth, Wangaratta	
Victoria	Wodonga	Wodonga	531	330	Bandiana Link Road (B400) – Wodonga, Albury	
Victoria	Wodonga	Wodonga	531	330	Victoria Cross Parade (C315) – Beechworth, Wangaratta	
Victoria	Wodonga	Bandiana	533	331	Kiewa Valley Highway (C531) – Mount Beauty, Falls Creek	
Victoria	Kiewa River		536	333	Bridge over the river (bridge name unknown)	
Victoria	Wodonga	Bonegilla	541	336	Bonegilla Road (C541) – Hume Dam	
Victoria	Towong	Huon	556	345	Kiewa East Road (C533) – Tangambalanga, Dartmouth, Omeo	
Victoria	Towong	Tallangatta	574	357	Omeo Highway (C543) – Omeo, Bairnsdale	
Victoria	Mitta Mitta River		579	360	Bridge over the river (bridge name unknown)	
Victoria	Towong	Bullio	584	363	Murray River Road (C546) – Granya	
Victoria	Towong	Shelley	611	380	Shelley–Jingellic Road (C547) – Walwa, Jingellic	
Victoria	Towong	Cudgewa	633	393	Cudgewa–Tintaldra Road (C548) – Cudgewa, Tintaldra	
Victoria	Towong	Colac Colac	643	400	Benambra–Corryong Road (C545) – Benambra, Omeo, Mount Hotham, Bairnsdale	
Victoria	Towong	Towong	656	408	Murray River Road (C546) – Towong, Tintaldra	
Victoria	Towong	Upper Towong	663	412	Murray Valley Highway	Eastern terminus of highway and route B400
State border			663	412	Victoria – New South Wales state border	
New South Wales	Murray River		663	412	Bringenbrong Bridge	
New South Wales	Snowy Valleys	Bringenbrong	663	412	Alpine Way – Khancoban, Thredbo, Jindabyne	Western terminus of Alpine Way
1.000 mi = 1.609 km; 1.000 km = 0.621 mi: Concurrency terminus; Route transition

== See also ==
- Highways in Australia
- Highways in New South Wales
- List of highways in Victoria
