= Loddon Valley Highway =

Highway in Victoria

Loddon Valley Highway Victoria
- Coordinates: 35.763115°S 143.931115°E (North end); 36.755631°S 144.263621°E (South end)

General information
- Type: Highway
- Length: 124 km (77 mi)
- Gazetted: September 1915 (as Main Road); 1946 (as State Highway)
- Route number(s): B260 (1998–present)
- Former route number: State Route 141 (1986–1998)

Major junctions
- North end: Murray Valley Highway; Kerang, Victoria
- Boort–Pyramid Road
- South end: Calder Highway; Ironbark, Bendigo

Location(s)
- Region: Loddon Mallee
- Major settlements: Durham Ox, Serpentine, Eaglehawk

Highway system
- Highways in Australia; National Highway • Freeways in Australia; Highways in Victoria

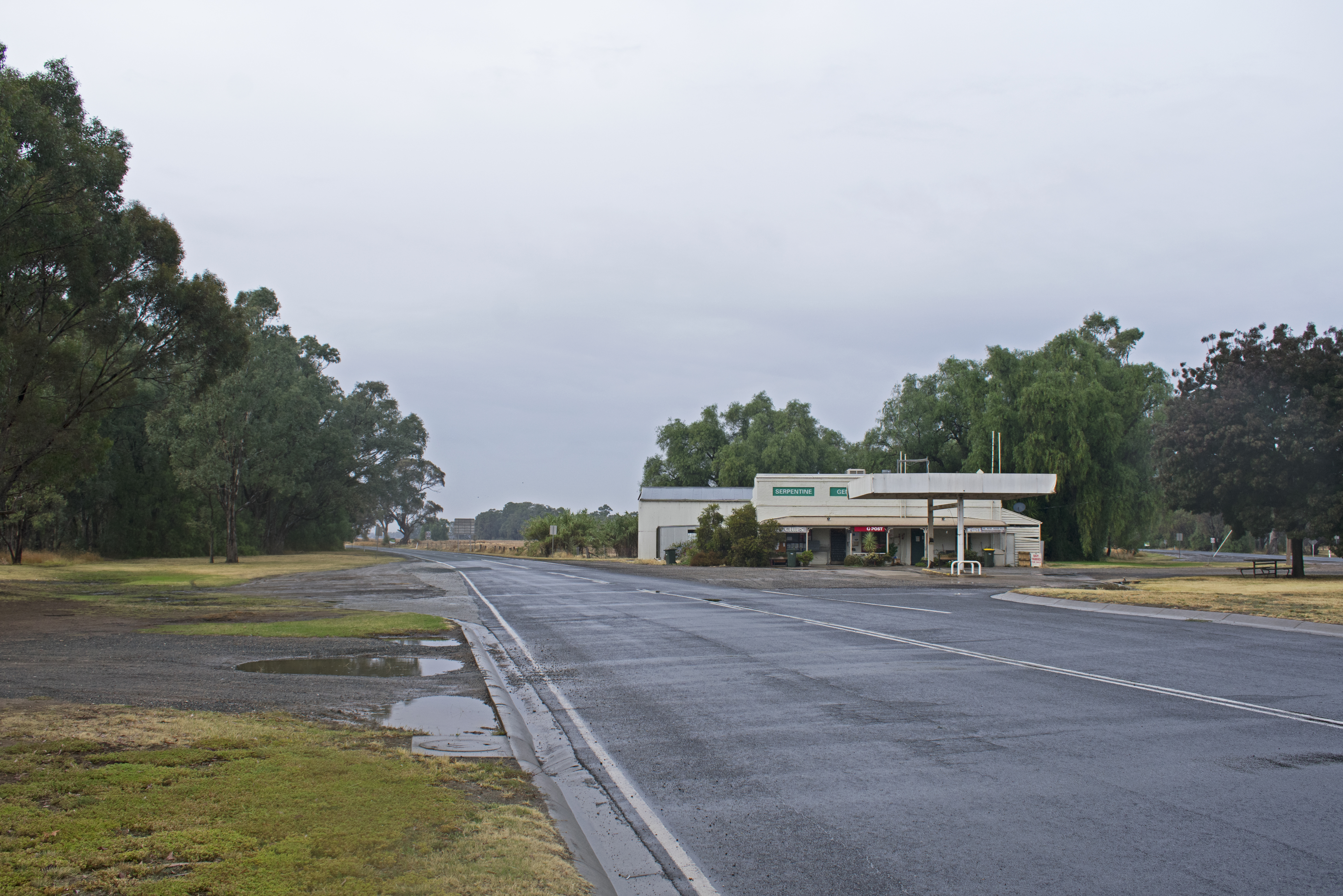
Loddon Valley Highway in Serpentine

Loddon Valley Highway runs roughly north-west from Bendigo to Kerang. It constitutes part of the direct route from Melbourne to the popular Murray River holiday areas around Swan Hill.

== Route ==
Loddon Valley Highway commences at the intersection with Murray Valley Highway just south of the fringes of Kerang and heads in a southerly direction as a dual-lane single carriageway rural highway, running parallel to the Loddon River a short distance to the west of the road for much of its length. It continues south through Durham Ox until it reaches Serpentine, where it veers more to the south-east away from the river course, passing through the hills around Eaglehawk on the outskirts of Greater Bendigo, before it eventually terminates at the intersection with Calder Highway in Ironbark, in the north-western suburbs of Bendigo.

== History ==
Within Victoria, the passing of the Country Roads Act 1912 through the Parliament of Victoria provided for the establishment of the Country Roads Board (later VicRoads) and their ability to declare Main Roads, taking responsibility for the management, construction and care of the state's major roads from local municipalities. Bendigo-Serpentine Road was declared a Main Road from Bendigo to Yarraberb on 20 September 1915, and Loddon Valley Road from Kerang through Durham Ox to Serpentine was declared a Main Road in the 1937/38 financial year.

The passing of the Highways and Vehicles Act 1924 provided for the declaration of State Highways, roads two-thirds financed by the State government through the Country Roads Board. Loddon Valley Highway was declared a State Highway in 1946, from Kerang via Serpentine to Bendigo, subsuming the original declarations of Loddon Valley Road and Bendigo-Serpentine Road as Main Roads.

Loddon Valley Highway was signed as State Route 141 between Kerang and Bendigo in 1986; with Victoria's conversion to the newer alphanumeric system in the late 1990s, this was replaced by route B260.

The passing of the Road Management Act 2004 granted the responsibility of overall management and development of Victoria's major arterial roads to VicRoads: in 2004, VicRoads re-declared the road as Loddon Valley Highway (Arterial #6630), beginning at Murray Valley Highway at Kerang and ending at Calder Highway in Ironbark, Bendigo.

== Major intersections ==
| LGA | Location | km | mi | Destinations | Notes |
|---|---|---|---|---|---|
| Gannawarra | Kerang | 0.0 | 0.0 | Murray Valley Highway (B400) – Kerang, Swan Hill, Cohuna, Echuca | Northern terminus of highway and route B260 |
| Loddon | Durham Ox | 40.6 | 25.2 | Boort–Pyramid Road (C267 east) – Pyramid Hill, Cohuna | Concurrency with route C267 |
| Loddon | Durham Ox | 42.3 | 26.3 | Boort–Pyramid Road (C267 west) – Boort, Wycheproof | Concurrency with route C267 |
| Loddon | Jarklin | 52.5 | 32.6 | Boort–Mitiamo Road (C334) – Mitiamo, Echuca | |
| Loddon | Serpentine | 75.2 | 46.7 | Bridgewater–Serpentine Road (C274) – Bridgewater On Loddon, Dunolly | |
| Greater Bendigo | Woodvale | 115.5 | 71.8 | Swan Hill railway line | |
| Greater Bendigo | Eaglehawk | 119.1 | 74.0 | Sailors Gully Road (Bendigo–Pyramid Road) (C336) – Pyramid Hill | |
| Greater Bendigo | California Gully | 120.2 | 74.7 | Swan Hill railway line | |
| Greater Bendigo | California Gully | 120.3 | 74.8 | Sandhurst Road (C329) – Bendigo, Heathcote | Traffic light intersection |
| Greater Bendigo | Long Gully | 122.0 | 75.8 | Holdsworth Road (C333) – White Hills | |
| Greater Bendigo | Long Gully | 122.7 | 76.2 | Creeth Street (Golden Square–Long Gully Road) (C323) – West Bendigo, Golden Square | Traffic light intersection |
| Greater Bendigo | Ironbark | 123.8 | 76.9 | Calder Highway (A79) – Marong, Mildura, Bendigo, Melbourne | Southern terminus of highway and route B260 at traffic light intersection |
Concurrency terminus; Route transition

== See also ==
- Highways in Australia
- Highways in Victoria
