= Boundary Bend =

Boundary Bend Victoria
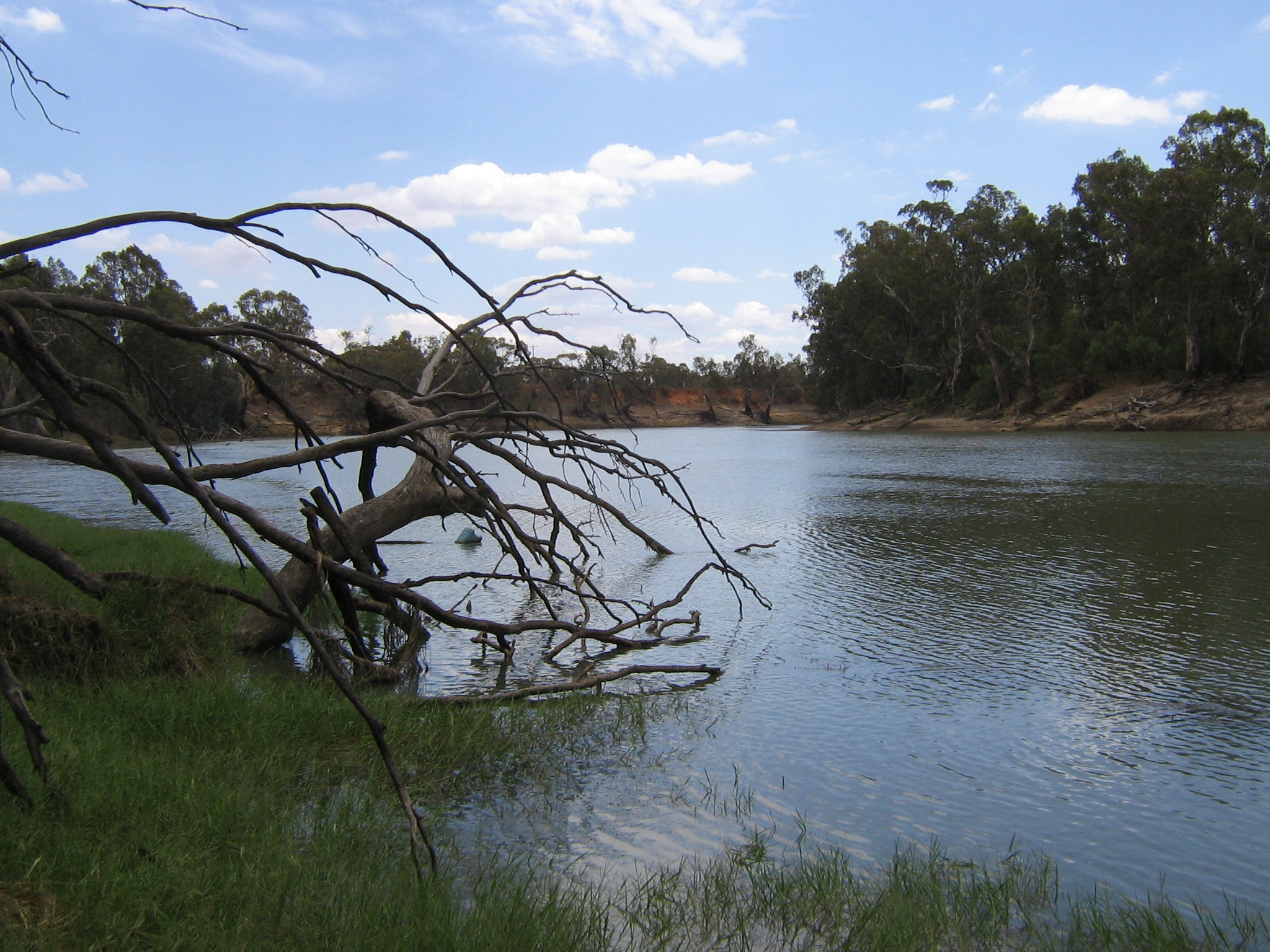
- Murray River at Boundary Bend

- Coordinates: 34°43′0″S 143°09′0″E
- Population: 132 (2016 census)
- Postcode(s): 3599
- Location: 430 km (267 mi) NW of Melbourne; 93 km (58 mi) NW of Swan Hill; 49 km (30 mi) SE of Robinvale
- LGA(s): Rural City of Swan Hill
- State electorate(s): Mildura
- Federal division(s): Mallee
Localities around Boundary Bend:
New South Wales	New South Wales	New South Wales
Lake Powell	Boundary Bend	New South Wales
Wandown	Kooloonong	Narrung

Boundary Bend is a town in the state of Victoria, Australia. It is near the junction of the Murray River and Murrumbidgee River. It is located about 50 kilometres east along the Murray Valley Highway from the twin towns of Robinvale in Victoria and Euston in New South Wales, about 90 km north of Swan Hill. At the 2016 census, Boundary Bend and the surrounding area had a population of 132.

The access to the junction of the two rivers is down a track off the highway. It was at this point that Captain Charles Sturt and his party of explorers first sighted the Murray River in 1830. They had travelled down the Murrumbidgee, and continued downstream along the Murray in their whaleboat.

Boundary Bend Post Office opened on 6 April 1923.

For many years, there were two Paddle Steamer hulls located just underwater on the southern bank of the Murray River. These were the Canally and the Hero. Both hulls were raised and removed for restoration February 1998. The PS Hero was restored to operation at Echuca.

Boundary Bend is popular for its fishing and relaxed lifestyle.

Many returned soldiers from the First World War were allocated farming blocks to the south of the town.
