= Mount Hope (Victoria) =

Mountain in Victoria, Australia

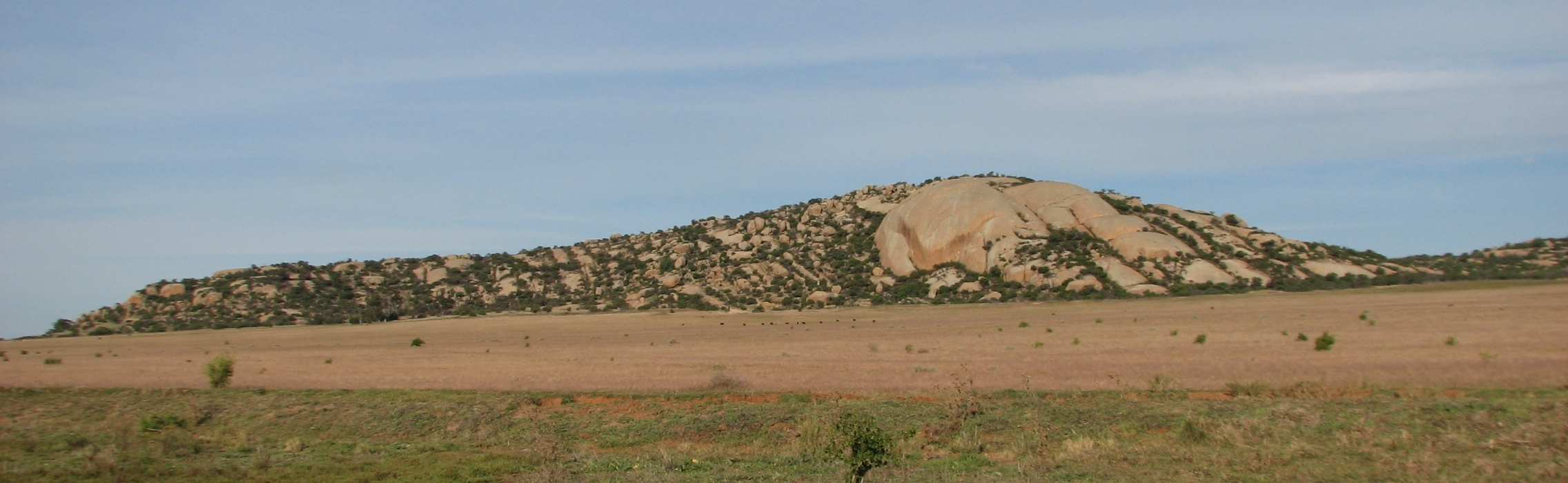
- Mount Hope from the north west

Highest point
- Elevation: 202 metres (663 ft) AHD
- Coordinates: 35°59′56″S 144°12′39″E

Geography
- Location within Victoria
- Location: Victoria, Australia

Climbing
- First ascent: 1836 by Thomas Livingstone Mitchell

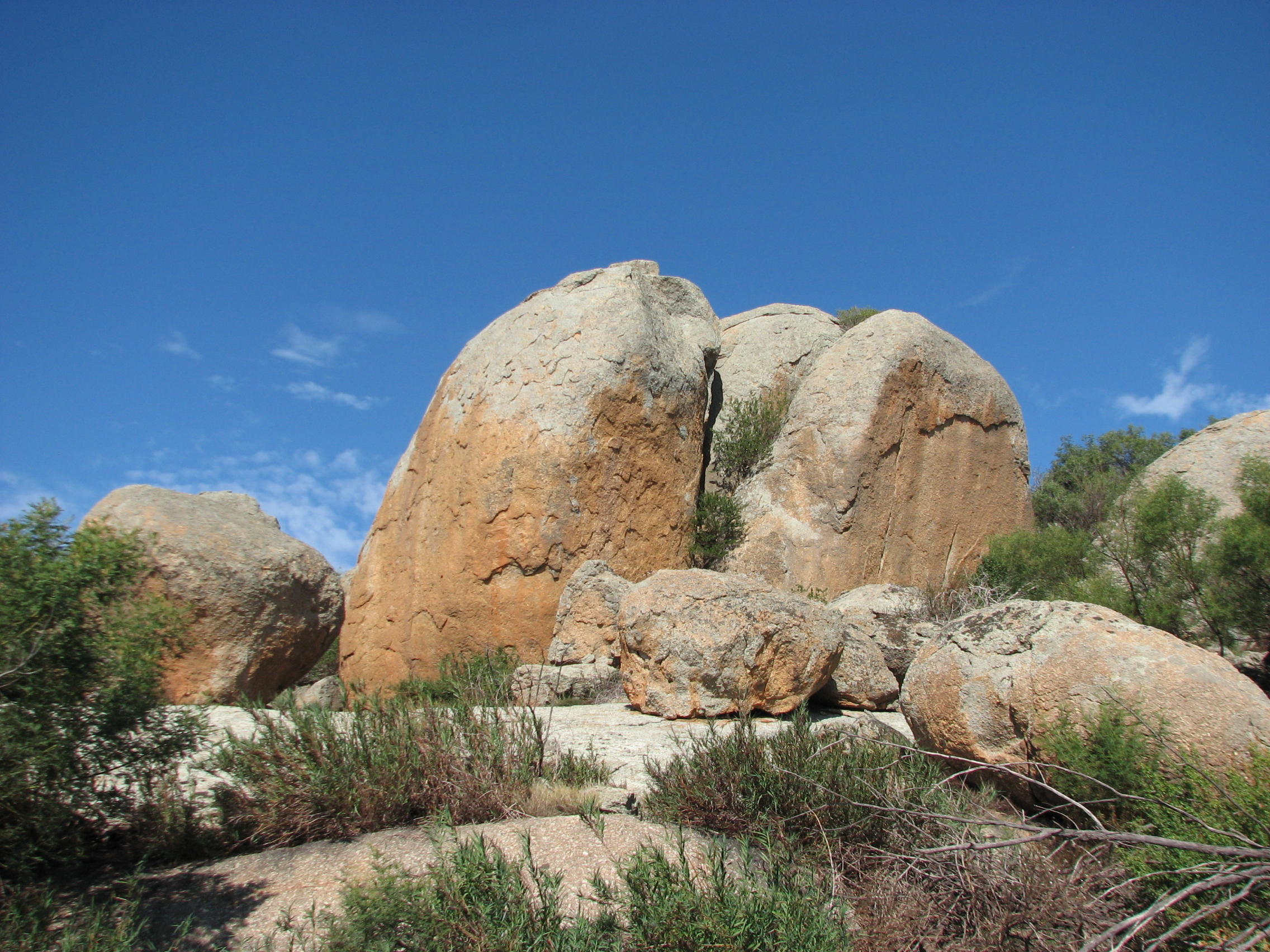
Rock formations at Mount Hope

Mount Hope is a granite outcrop located to the north of Pyramid Hill in northern Victoria, Australia. The outcrop lies within the 126 hectare Mount Hope Nature Conservation Reserve which is managed by Parks Victoria.

The reserve has limited facilities, including picnic tables and an unsealed parking area at the foot of the outcrop which is accessed from the unsealed Old Leitchville Road. Activities include rock climbing and bird observing.

Communications facilities for Ambulance Victoria, Goulburn Murray Water and the Department of Sustainability and Environment are located near the mountain summit.

== History ==
In 1836 Scottish-born explorer Thomas Livingstone Mitchell became the first European to sight the mountain. He ascended it on June 28 after having sighted it four days earlier from the north-west and commented:

This hill consisted of immense blocks of common granite composed of white felspar and quartz and black mica; and it appeared to form the western extremity of a low range. It was indeed a welcome sight to us all after traversing for several months so much flat country; and to me it was particularly interesting for, from its summit, I expected to obtain an extensive view over the unknown region between us and the southern coast. I accordingly named the hill Mount Hope.

On the summit he discovered two new plant species, Philotheca pungens and Hibbertia incana. He observed in the distance what is now known as Pyramid Hill:

A remarkable hill of granite appeared 5 1/3 miles from Mount Hope, bearing 30 degrees 10 minutes West of South. It is a triangular pyramid and, being quite isolated, it closely resembles the monuments of Egypt

Mitchell changed his course, having observed promising country from its summit:

The country which I had seen this day beyond Mount Hope was too inviting to be left behind us unexplored; and I therefore determined to turn into it without further delay, and to pursue the bearing of 215 degrees from North as the general direction of our route, until we should fall in with the line of river trees before mentioned

The mountain was climbed again in 1838 by Joseph Hawdon who was droving cattle between Howlong in New South Wales and Adelaide in South Australia. Hawdon observed:

This hill appears to be inhabited by a small Kangaroo of fawn colour, with a most beautiful head, and about the size of an English hare. I shot one, and preserved its skin.

The small kangaroo was an eastern hare-wallaby, a species that became extinct a few years after the arrival of the first European settlers.

In 1845 Mount Hope Station was established. The station originally covered 77,000 acres and had 100,000 sheep.

In 1857 unsubstantiated rumours led to a gold rush to the area, but no gold was ever found.

On 1 September 1860, members of the Burke and Wills expedition ascended the summit, including Ludwig Becker, a naturalist, geologist and artist. In his first report to the Royal Society of Victoria, Becker commented:

The whole mountain chain is Granit of a very coarse character, brittle, and fast decomposing. Immense blocks stretch their backs alongside the hills, where they look like petrified Wales and Elephants of pre-adamitic dimensions. It was surprising to see the great number of butterflies, moths and other insects swarming about the rich, blooming vegetation growing out from between the crevices of the gigantic boulders.

Becker made a watercolour sketch depicting the view to Pyramid Hill from the summit. The hill shown to the left is now a gravel quarry.

In 1898 the body of farm labourer was discovered at the foot of a 100-foot high boulder by children during a school picnic. Although there was no evidence to determine whether the death was accidental or not, the location subsequently became known as Suicide Rock.

=== Quarry ===
Stone from a quarry operated by Ole Roald at Mount Hope was used to construct roads in the Cohuna, Boort and Kerang districts after World War II. The quarry was purchased by Mawsons in 1952 and used for gravel and stone. The stone was found to be of inferior quality and the site lacked electricity need to operate power crushers and screens. The quarry was closed in 1958, with equipment moved to another quarry at Lake Boga.
