= Wandown =

Wandown Victoria
- Coordinates: 34°49′S 142°56′E
- Population: 0 (2016 census)
- Postcode(s): 3585
- Location: 446 km (277 mi) from Melbourne; 39 km (24 mi) from Robinvale; 102 km (63 mi) from Swan Hill; 124 km (77 mi) from Mildura
- LGA(s): Rural City of Swan Hill
Localities around Wandown:
Lake Powell	Lake Powell	Boundary Bend
Annuello	Wandown	Kooloonong
Annuello	Annuello	Kooloonong

Wandown is a locality in the Rural City of Swan Hill, Victoria, Australia.
