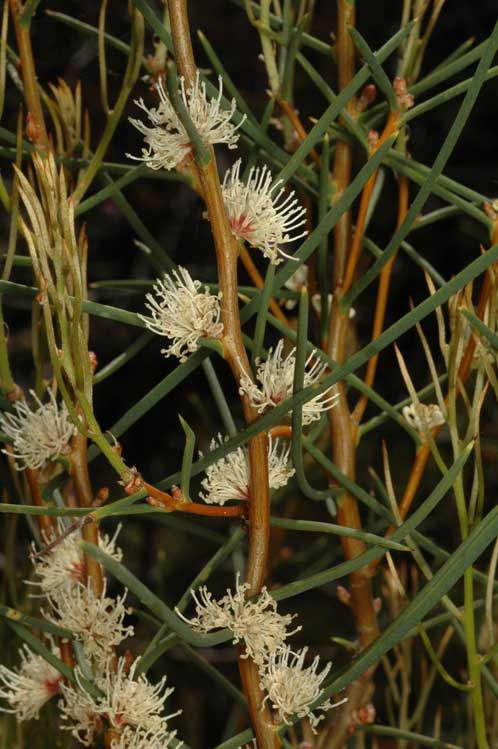
- Hakea mitchellii in the ANBG

Scientific classification
- Kingdom: Plantae
- Clade: Tracheophytes
- Clade: Angiosperms
- Clade: Eudicots
- Order: Proteales
- Family: Proteaceae
- Genus: Hakea
- Species: H. mitchellii

Binomial name
- Hakea mitchellii Meisn.
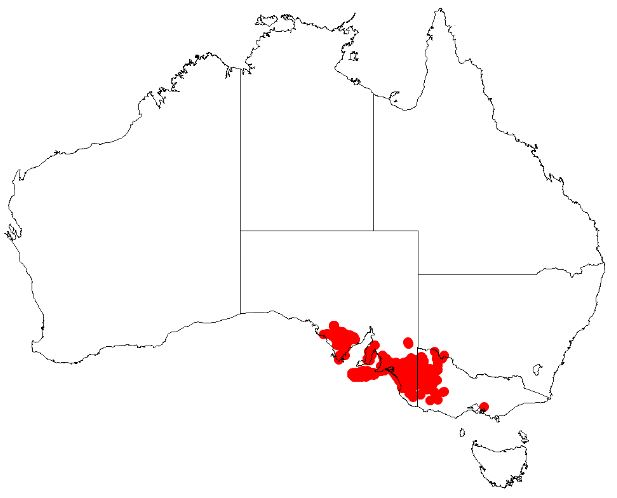
- Occurrence data from AVH

Synonyms
- Hakea muelleriana J.M.Black

= Hakea mitchellii =

Desert hakea

Species of shrub from South Australia and Victoria

Hakea mitchellii, commonly known as desert hakea, is a shrub species in the family Proteaceae.

== Description ==
Hakea mitchellii is a dense rounded medium to large shrub between 1–4 m (3–10 ft) high and wide and does not form a lignotuber. Leaves vary from terete, linear to ovate are 3.5–10 cm (1–4 in) long and 1–10 cm (0.4–4 in) wide. Profuse showy white or cream flowers appear in racemes in the leaf axils between October and January in the species' native range. Ellipsoidal to ovoid shaped fruit 1–2 cm (0.4–0.8 in) long by 0.5–1.5 cm (0.2–0.6 in) wide tapering to a small beak.

== Taxonomy and naming ==
The species was first formally described in 1856 by Swiss botanist Carl Meissner and the description was published in Prodromus Systematis Naturalis Regni Vegetabilis. The type specimen was collected near Pyramid Hill during Thomas Livingston Mitchell's 1836 expedition. Hakea mitchellii was named after Mitchell to honour the collector of the species.

== Distribution and habitat ==
Desert hakea grows in mallee-heath vegetation on calcareous sandy soil. Mainly a South Australian species occurring on Eyre, Yorke and Fleurieu Peninsulas, Kangaroo Island and south of the Murray River to Naracoorte, extending into western Victoria.
