= Bert Gregory =

Australian rules footballer

Personal information
- Full name: Robert Augustus Gregory
- Born: 17 October 1888; Pyramid Hill, Victoria
- Died: 9 November 1967 (aged 79); Pyramid Hill, Victoria
- Original team: South Ballarat
- Height: 183 cm (6 ft 0 in)
- Weight: 79 kg (174 lb)

Playing career^{1}
Years	Club	Games (Goals)
1907	Melbourne	2 (1)
- ^{1} Playing statistics correct to the end of 1907.

Robert Augustus Gregory (17 October 1888 – 9 November 1967) was an Australian rules footballer who played for the Melbourne Football Club in the Victorian Football League (VFL).

== Family ==
The son of Robert Gregory, and Elizabeth Martha Gregory (-1929), née Phillips, Robert Augustus Gregory was born at Pyramid Hill on 17 October 1888.

He married Ina Marguerite Trotman in (1899-1977) in 1931.

== Death ==
He died at the Pyramid Hill Bush Nursing Hospital on 9 November 1967.
