= Philotheca pungens =

Prickly waxflower

Scientific classification
- Kingdom: Plantae
- Clade: Embryophytes
- Clade: Tracheophytes
- Clade: Spermatophytes
- Clade: Angiosperms
- Clade: Eudicots
- Clade: Rosids
- Order: Sapindales
- Family: Rutaceae
- Genus: Philotheca
- Species: P. pungens

Binomial name
- Philotheca pungens (Lindl.) Paul G.Wilson

Synonyms
- Eriostemon pungens Lindl.; Phebalium pungens (Lindl.) Benth.

Species of plant

Philotheca pungens, commonly known as prickly waxflower, is a species of flowering plant in the family Rutaceae and is endemic to south-eastern Australia. It is an undershrub with linear to narrow oblong or needle-like leaves and white flowers usually arranged singly in leaf axils.

== Description ==
Philotheca pungens is an undershrub that typically grows to a height of 60 cm (24 in) but often lies on the ground. The leaves are linear to narrow oblong or needle-like, 8–12 mm (0.31–0.47 in) long, flat on the upper surface but prominently keeled on the lower side. The flowers are usually arranged singly in leaf axils on a pedicel 3–5 mm (0.12–0.20 in) long with lance-shaped bracteoles at the base. The sepals are fleshy, more or less round, about 1 mm (0.039 in) long and the petals are egg-shaped, about 4 mm (0.16 in) long and white, sometimes pink on the back. The stamens are covered with long, soft hairs and the stye is glabrous. Flowering occurs from August to November and the fruit is 4–6 mm (0.16–0.24 in) long and beaked.

== Taxonomy ==
This species was first recorded by explorer Thomas Mitchell in 1836 when he ascended Mount Hope in northern Victoria. Mitchell described the plant as "a remarkable new species of Eriostemon forming a scrubby spiny bush, with much the appearance of a Leptospermum". It was first formally described in 1838 by botanist John Lindley, who gave it the name Eriostemon pungens and the description was published in Mitchell's book, Three Expeditions into the interior of Eastern Australia . In 1998, Paul G. Wilson changed the name to Philotheca pungens in the journal Nuytsia.

== Distribution and habitat ==
Philotheca pungens grows in heathland and is found in south and south-east South Australia and in central and western Victoria as far east as Bendigo. Associated tree species include Eucalyptus leptophylla and Eucalyptus incrassata.
