= Sunraysia-Riverlands Rugby League =

Rugby competition in Victoria, Australia

- Sport: Rugby league
- Instituted: 1991
- Ceased: 1995
- Re-formed: 2011
- President: Trevor Ryan
- Number of teams: 2
- Country: Sunraysia, Victoria, Australia
- Holders: Mildura Warriors
- Most titles: Robinvale Storms (6 titles)
- Related competition: NRL Victoria

The Sunraysia-Riverlands Rugby League is a rugby league football competition in Victoria, Australia held by NRL Victoria. The league was formed in 1991 representing 5 clubs in the far south-west corner of New South Wales, along with 1 club from Victoria. During its first 4 seasons, the league was overseen by both the Country Rugby League & Victorian Rugby League, before the competition was disbanded in 1995.

The league was reformed in 2011 with five clubs, however as of 2022, this has been reduced to 2 clubs both located in Victoria. As both clubs remaining are from Victoria, sole control of the league passed to NRL Victoria. This changed however when the league entered a temporary amalgamation with the NSWRL's Outback Rugby League for 2022 due to a lack of numbers, with joint control returning once more. This arrangement ended after the two leagues demalgamated in 2023.

== Clubs ==
Colours	Club	Town	Ground
	Mildura Tigers	Mildura	Nichols Point Reserve, Nichols Point
	Mildura Warriors	Mildura	Nichols Point Reserve, Nichols Point
	Robinvale Storms	Robinvale	Robinvale Sports Ground

=== Former clubs ===
Known Teams	Championships	Existence
Buronga	1	1991–?
Dareton Dragons	0	?–1995
Euston Robinvale Sea Eagles	3	?–1995
Mildura City	1	1991–1995
Murray Darling Eels	0	1991–1995
Wentworth	0	?–1995

== Champions ==
This is a list of the Sunraysia-Riverlands Rugby League 1st Grade competition champions and the runners-up for each of the 5 Seasons the competition existed. There was also other competitions which existed below the 1st Grade competition such as the Reserve Grade competition which operated a feeder-league to the 1st Grade competition.

Season	Premiers	Score	Runners-up
1990	Murray-Darling Eels	34 – 32	Mildura City Rabbitohs
1991	Buronga Bulldogs	22 – 16	Euston Robinvale
1992	Euston Robinvale	54 – 10	Buronga Bulldogs
1993	Euston Robinvale	52 – 20	Murray Darling Eels
1994	Euston Robinvale	36 – 12	Murray Darling Eels
1995	Mildura City Tigers	30 – 22	Murray Darling Eels
Hiatus 1996–2009
2010	Mildura Tigers		
2011	Mildura Tigers		Robinvale Storm
2012	Mildura Warriors	24 – 17	Mildura Tigers
2013	Chaffey Titans	22 – 20	Mildura City Tigers
2014	Robinvale Storm	20 – 6	Mildura Warriors
2015	Robinvale Storm	22 – 16	Chaffey Titans
2016	Robinvale Storm	28 – 20	Mildura Tigers
2017	Chaffey Titans	14 – 12	Mildura City Tigers
2018	Mildura Tigers	16 – 4	Robinvale Storm
2019	Mildura Warriors	14 – 4	Mildura Tigers
2020	2020 and 2021 seasons cancelled due to COVID-19 pandemic		
2021	2020 and 2021 seasons cancelled due to COVID-19 pandemic		

== See also ==
- Rugby league in New South Wales
