= Lake Powell, Victoria =

Town in Australia

Lake Powell
- Town
- Coordinates: 34°43′S 142°55′E
- Country: Australia
- State: Victoria
- LGA: Rural City of Swan Hill
- Location: 448 km (278 mi) from Melbourne; 108 km (67 mi) from Mildura; 23 km (14 mi) from Robinvale; 110 km (68 mi) from Swan Hill

Population
  - Total: 86 (SAL 2021)
- Postcode: 3597
Localities around Lake Powell
Tol Tol	New South Wales	New South Wales
Bannerton	Lake Powell	Boundary Bend
Annuello	Wandown	Kooloonong

Lake Powell is a locality in Victoria, Australia, located approximately 23 km from Robinvale, Victoria.

A highly multicultural town, it is known for its Malaysian, Thai and Vanuatuan communities, with Bislama, Malay, Mandarin Chinese and Thai being widely spoken in the town. It also has one of the highest concentrations of Buddhists in Australia, with 22.1% of the town's population practising Buddhism as of the 2021 census.
