= Kerang Post Office =

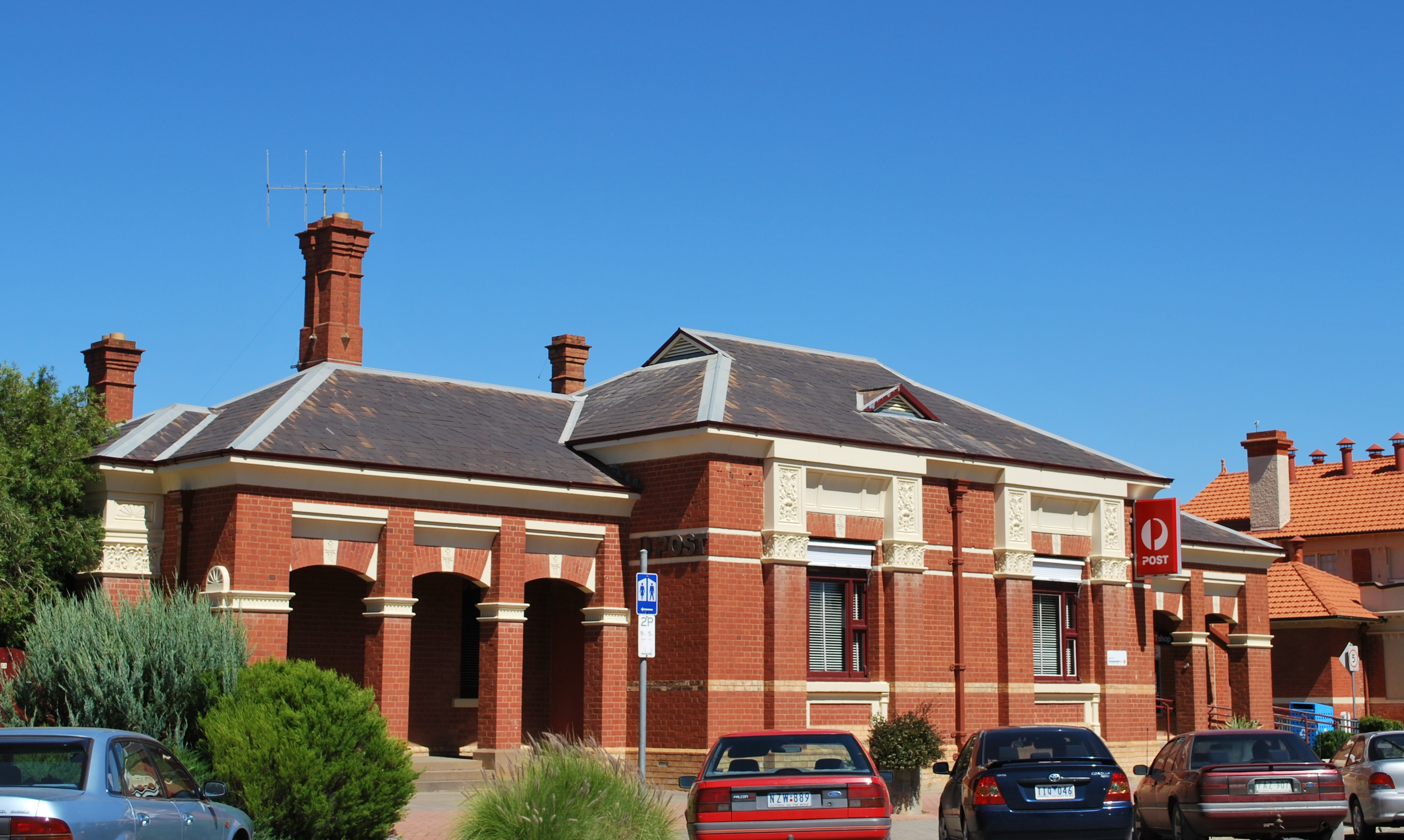

- Location within Victoria
- 35.7336°S 143.9208°E
- Location: 51–53 Victoria Street, Kerang, Victoria, Australia

Commonwealth Heritage List
- Official name: Kerang Post Office
- Type: Listed place (Historic)
- Designated: 8 November 2011
- Reference no.: 106132

Kerang Post Office is a heritage-listed post office at 51–53 Victoria Street, Kerang, Victoria, Australia. It was designed by the Victorian Colonial Architect, George William Watson, and was built in 1886. It was added to the Australian Commonwealth Heritage List on 8 November 2011.

== History ==
Kerang, an irrigation district of dairying, horticulture, lucerne and grain production, is located about 280 km north-west of Melbourne on the Loddon River. The first Europeans in the area were the party of Thomas Mitchell in 1836, and squatters began to take up local land in 1845. Between this period and the early 1860s, a public house, stores, a church and dwellings were constructed near the local river crossing, which eventually became the nucleus of a small village that was proclaimed as Kerang in 1861. The Shire of Kerang was declared in 1871, and Kerang grew considerably in the 1870s and 1880s, particularly when business was facilitated by the arrival of the railway from Bendigo in 1884 and the construction of the Kerang–Koondrook Tramway in 1888. Consequently, the population had increased to over 1000 by 1891. Formal postal services to the Kerang district were first established in 1875. A contract was let for the present building in 1885, which replaced an earlier post office and savings bank (1877). Kerang Post Office site includes both a post office and residence.

The present building was designed by the Victorian Colonial Architect, George William Watson, and built in 1886. In 1925–27, unidentified alterations and additions were undertaken, possibly including external sunblinds to front windows. A small detached garage or shed constructed in rear yard of quarters for the postmaster was added at an unknown date.

A large rear addition to the east of the original post office wing was built c. 1940s to accommodate the telephone exchange, including a small projecting wing at the southwest corner of the building, where the present screen to the private letter boxes is located. The original timber picket fence was demolished on southern side of building. A detached battery room was constructed to east of new addition, and new signage was added to front elevation. It also underwent a general refurbishment of interior spaces including replacement of some ceilings and verandah soffit with fibre cement sheet lining. The infill of the northernmost bay of the southern verandah with a brick dwarf wall and glazed screen possibly occurred at this time, along with the overpainting of the rendered dressings.

In the 1960s, the building underwent a general refurbishment of the interiors, including construction of timber-framed partitions within public space to form the postmaster's office and demolition of the original brick wall dividing the strongroom from the post office, a new counter and screen, new vinyl flooring, new lighting; fireplaces bricked in and heaters installed; acoustic ceiling tiles installed in former telephone exchange; door opening in rear (east) wall of post office public space bricked in; glazed screen installed between post office and former telegraph room; entrance door from north verandah to post office infilled; openings in front wall of former telegraph room enlarged; small porch over entrance to former telephone exchange room in south elevation; private letter boxes installed at southwest corner of building, new awning constructed over and new concrete steps to access boxes built.

Brick additions to garage to house scooters were added at an unknown date. In 1975, an automatic telephone exchange constructed on site to east of post office and telephone functions removed from post office building.

In 1984, the window openings in the rear east wall of the post office were infilled, and there was a partial refurbishment of interiors. particularly amenities and retail display fixtures. Another general refurbishment took place in 1995, with joinery and signage brought in line with Australia Post retail livery, the upgrading of the air conditioning plant, installation of ramp access in the front verandah, upgrading of signage, and the installation of private letter boxes in the front elevation to the verandah.

== Description ==
Kerang Post Office is at 51–53 Victoria Street, Kerang, comprising the whole of Lot 1 LP217682.

Kerang Post Office is located within the civic precinct in Kerang's principle commercial and retail area which is centred around Victoria Street. The post office is flanked by the similarly aged and scaled court house, with the town hall and municipal offices further south. Prior to subdivision associated with the split of Telecom from Australia Post, the rectangular allotment extended from Victoria Street through to Albert Street at the rear.

Kerang Post Office is a symmetrical single-storey building of brick construction on a U-shaped plan; the original L-shaped plan was extended in the 1940s with the construction of the southern wing to accommodate a telephone exchange. The building is constructed to the street alignment on the western side and is reasonably close to the southern boundary. The site area to the north and east of the residential component (north wing) however, is private open garden area. This area has been subdivided further to form front and rear garden areas, effectively dividing the area sublet for residential purposes from the remaining site and garages.

In elevation the Post Office is a symmetrical, single-storied design in tuckpointed [largely deteriorated] red brick with cream brick course lines, a cream-brick plinth and flanking piers and floral decorative panels in stucco. The break-fronted design comprises a central pavilion with a three-bayed loggia with segmental arches and bluestone steps to either side. A projecting side bay on the north elevation divides the front wing from a verandah elevation to the north wing residential area. . The roof is hipped, with slate tile cladding and galvanised iron ridge capping, coved stucco cornice moulding to eaves soffits, Dutch gables over the public space, a small gablet vent directly over the central pavilion and multiple tall red face brick chimney stacks which show Elizabethan influence.

The south wing – a 1940s addition – is identified by stretcher bond brickwork and flat-arched openings, although it does pick up the coved cornice treatment along the south elevation.

The post office includes a retail and counter area, postal manager's office, a mail room and delivery sorting room, several rooms and stores associated with the former telephone exchange, a lunchroom and toilets. The residence has four bedrooms, a lounge, central hall, kitchen and bathroom, with a laundry attached as a timber-framed lean-to. The site also includes a detached battery room, timber-framed garage and brick scooter shed.

== Condition and integrity ==
Despite the construction of an extensive south wing addition in the 1940s and other minor alterations, the external intactness of the original post office and quarters building is very good.

Internally, the building's ability to demonstrate its original plan and form remains reasonable, despite alterations to the southern side of the post office to incorporate the 1940s telephone exchange and various phases of general refurbishment, although the integrity of the original planning has been somewhat diminished in places.

The overall condition of the building appears very sound and well maintained, with the exception of some minor cracking in the western wall of the post office public hall and general refurbishment requirements.

== Heritage listing ==
Kerang Post Office, constructed in 1886, is one of a relatively large group of post and telegraph offices with combined residences constructed during the 1880s. It demonstrates all of the typical characteristics of the type including a frontal postal chamber which is expressed in the external form of the building, dual public access to an internal public hall via prominent loggias, distinct side access and clear separation of the residential component and an assumption of civic role as a major town form. The building has a very good degree of external integrity and intactness, although the interior has undergone alterations which have impacted on the original planning in places.

Stylistically, Kerang Post Office is a well composed design which befits its civic importance, further influenced by the neighbouring court house and council offices and town hall. The comprehensive application of the Italianate style with Queen Anne detailing and Elizabethan influence also remains clearly evident despite the construction of the south wing. Architecturally, the design is a very successful and early exploration of the Elizabethan style at a time of stylistic evolution within the Public Works Department and, as such, is an atypical response for its time. A small number of Elizabethan examples were produced by the Department from 1885 until 1892.

The Kerang Post Office is an essential element within a harmonious streetscape, particularly when viewed within the immediate context of the civic precinct of Victoria Street, including the court house and council offices. Individually, and as one of a group of civic buildings with aesthetic importance which retain a high degree of legibility, the post office is also a landmark element in the town.

Kerang Post Office is associated with the enduring and prolific Public Works Department architect, George Watson, who served the department from 1872 until after 1900. Watson was in charge of the Central Division of the department from 1882 and his position, coupled with freedom from the reign of former Chief Architect William Wardell, can be seen in the opportunistic exploration of new ideas in many of his designs including Kerang. The application of the Queen Anne style is characteristic of Watson's hand.

The curtilage includes the title block/allotment of the property.

The significant components of Kerang Post Office include the main postal building and residential wing of 1886. The former telephone exchange wing constructed in the c. 1940s is of contributory significance.
