= Happy Valley (Rural City of Swan Hill) =

- Town
- Coordinates: 34°41′33″S 142°43′01″E
- Country: Australia
- State: Victoria
- LGA: Rural City of Swan Hill

Government
  - State electorate: Mildura
  - Federal division: Mallee

Population
  - Total: 81 (2,016 census
- Postcode: 3549
Localities around Happy Valley
New South Wales	Robinvale Irrigation District Section C	Robinvale Irrigation District Section D
New South Wales	Happy Valley	Robinvale Irrigation District Section E
Wemen	Wemen	Bannerton

Happy Valley is a locality located in the Local Government Area of the Rural City of Swan Hill.
