= Chaffey Titans =

Australian rugby league football club

Club information
- Full name: Chaffey Titans Rugby League Football Club
- Colours: Red; White
- Founded: 2012

Current details
- Ground(s): Chaffey Secondary College, Mildura
- Competition: Sunraysia Rugby League

Records
- Premierships: 2 (2013, 2017)
- Runners-up: 1 (2015)

Chaffey Titans Rugby League Football Club is an Australian rugby league football club based in Mildura, Victoria. They conduct teams for junior, senior and women tag teams.

They won their first match of the 2012 season in the Sunraysia Rugby League defeating Sunraysia Rabbitohs 34–26. The following year 2013, they won the premiership against Mildura Tigers narrowly winning 22–20. They reached the final again in 2015, but lost 22–16 to Robinvale Storm. In 2017, they won their second premiership when they defeated Mildura Tigers 14–12.

== See also ==
- Rugby league in Victoria
