= Lake Tutchewop =

Lake in Victoria, Australia

- Location in Victoria
- Location: Mallee, Victoria
- Coordinates: 35°30′43″S 143°45′08″E
- Primary outflows: Evaporation
- Basin countries: Australia
- Surface area: 760 ha (1,900 acres)

Lake Tutchewop is a lake near Kerang in the Mallee region of Victoria in eastern Australia.

In the indigenous Wembawemba language, the lake's name is derived from kutyewap.

Lake Tutchewop is a Ramsar listed wetland of International significance. The wetland is currently operated as a terminal disposal basin system for the Barr Creek Drainage Diversion Scheme. The future management options for Lake Tutchewop are under investigation, particularly the technical assessments and modelling of surface water/groundwater interactions. Salt is believed to be stored in the shallow sediments under the lakes. However, it is not clear if groundwater processes in the vicinity of the lake will result in the future mobilisation of the salt storage.
