= Robinvale Storm =

Club information
- Full name: Robinvale Storm Rugby League Football Club
- Nickname: Storms
- Colours: Purple; White; Teal
- Founded: 2010

Current details
- Ground: Robinvale Sports Ground, Robinvale
- Competition: Sunraysia Rugby League

Records
- Premierships: 3 (2014, 2015, 2016)
- Runners-up: 2 (2011,2018)
- Wooden spoons: 1

Robinvale Storm Rugby League Football Club is an Australian rugby league football club based in Robinvale, Victoria, competing in the Sunraysia-Riverlands Rugby League. The club won their first premiership in 2014 defeating the Mildura Warriors 20-6, then winning back-to-back titles in 2015 defeating the Chaffey Titans 22-16, before completing their third in a row in 2016, defeating the Mildura Tigers 28-20.

== See also ==
- Rugby league in Victoria
