= Hibbertia incana =

Scientific classification
- Kingdom: Plantae
- Clade: Tracheophytes
- Clade: Angiosperms
- Clade: Eudicots
- Order: Dilleniales
- Family: Dilleniaceae
- Genus: Hibbertia
- Species: H. incana

Binomial name
- Hibbertia incana (Lindl.) Toelken

Synonyms
- List: Hibbertia stricta var. canescens Benth. p.p.; Pleurandra incana Lindl.; Hibbertia sericea auct. non (R.Br. ex DC.) Benth.: Bentham, G. (30 May 1863) p.p.; Hibbertia sericea auct. non (R.Br. ex DC.) Benth.: Willis, J.H. (1973) p.p.; Hibbertia sericea auct. non (R.Br. ex DC.) Benth.: Beadle, N.C.W. (1976) p.p.; Hibbertia sericea auct. non (R.Br. ex DC.) Benth.: Beadle, N.C.W., Evans, O.D. & Carolin, R.C. (1982) p.p.; Hibbertia sericea auct. non (R.Br. ex DC.) Benth.: Jessop, J.P. in Jessop, J.P. & Toelken, H.R. (ed.) (1986) p.p.; Hibbertia sericea auct. non (R.Br. ex DC.) Benth.: Harden, G.J. & Everett, J. in Harden, G.J. (ed.) (1990) p.p.

Species of flowering plant

Hibbertia incana is a small shrub that is native to south-eastern continental Australia. It grows to between 0.2 and 1.5 metres high and has yellow flowers which appear between October and December in the species native range.

The species was formally described in 1838 by botanist John Lindley in Three Expeditions into the interior of Eastern Australia. It was first recorded by explorer Thomas Livingstone Mitchell in 1836 when he ascended Mount Hope in Victoria. Lindley gave it the name Pleurandra incana. Mitchell described the plant as "a new and very beautiful species of Pleurandra with the aspect of the yellow Cistus of the Algarves." In 1995, Hellmut R. Toelken changed the name to Hibbertia incana in the Journal of the Adelaide Botanic Gardens.

Hibbertia incana is considered to be a synonym of Hibbertia crinita in New South Wales and its taxon concept is unclear in Victoria.
