= Bannerton, Victoria =

Bannerton Victoria
- Coordinates: 34°41′53″S 142°48′47″E
- Population: 40 (2016 census)
- Postcode(s): 3549
- Elevation: 56 m (184 ft)
- Location: 8 km (5 mi) from Powell; 13 km (8 mi) from Robinvale; 99 km (62 mi) from Mildura; 457 km (284 mi) from Melbourne
- LGA(s): Rural City of Swan Hill
Localities around Bannerton:
Robinvale Irrigation District Section E	Tol Tol	Tol Tol
Happy Valley	Bannerton	Lake Powell
Wemen	Annuello	Annuello

Bannerton is a locality in the Rural City of Swan Hill, Victoria, Australia.

The Post Office opened in February 1924 as Banner, was renamed Tol Tol later in 1924 and Bannerton in 1926, closing in 1974.
