= Ironbark, Victoria =

Ironbark
- Suburb
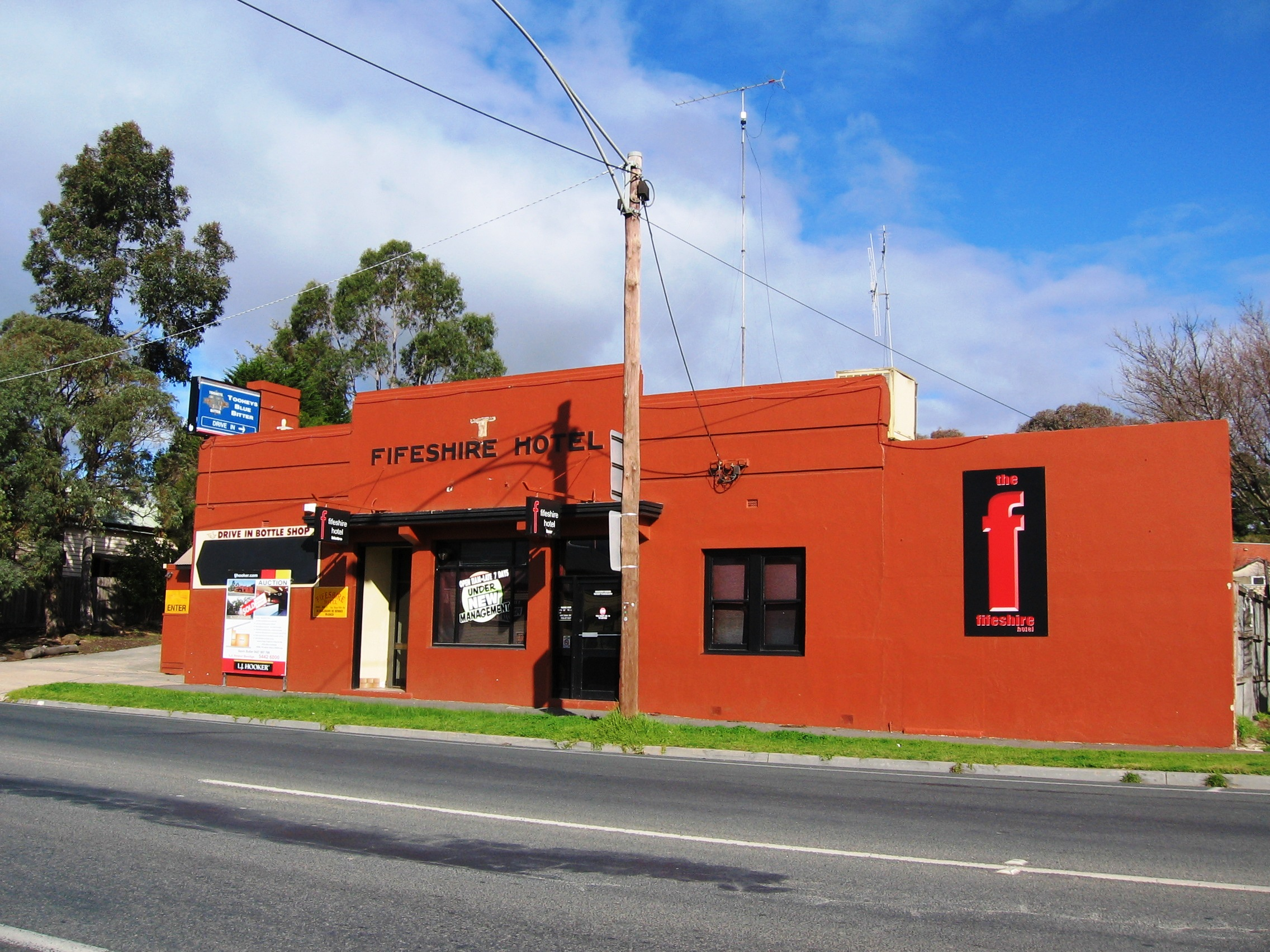
- Fifeshire Hotel in Ironbark, now closed, 2010

- Interactive map of Ironbark
- Coordinates: 36°45′21″S 144°15′34″E
- Country: Australia
- State: Victoria
- City: Bendigo
- LGA: City of Greater Bendigo
- Location: 2 km (1.2 mi) NW of Bendigo

Government
  - State electorate: Bendigo West
  - Federal division: Bendigo

Population
  - Total: 1,163 (2021 census)
- Postcode: 3550

Ironbark is a suburb of the regional city of Bendigo in north central Victoria, Australia, 2 kilometres (1.2 mi) north west of the Bendigo city centre. Ironbark was named after the Ironbark Valley. Ironbark was part of Long Gully until 1999 when it became a separate suburb.

At the 2021 census, Ironbark had a population of 1,163.
