= Towong Upper =

- Town
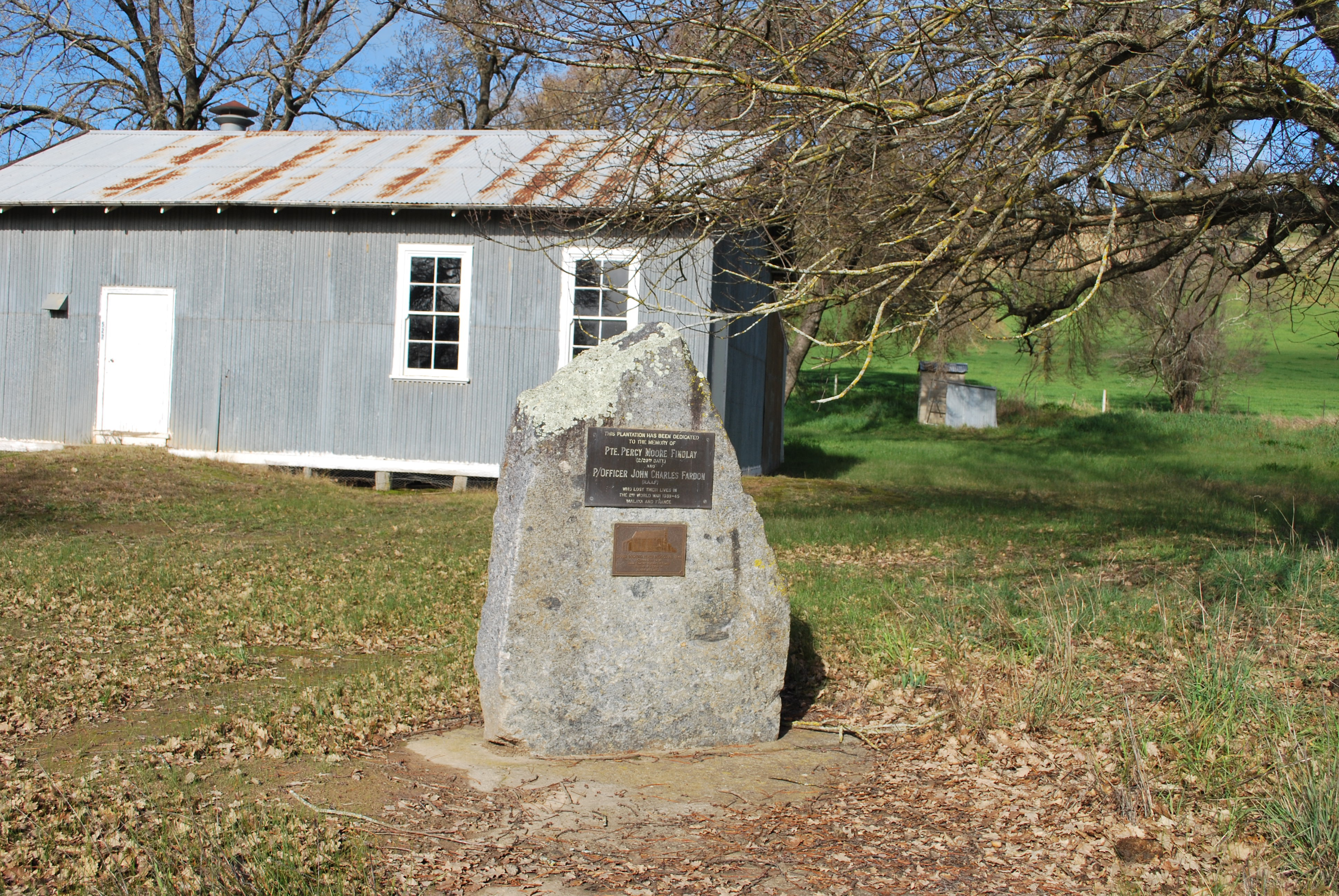
- War memorial at Upper Towong

- Coordinates: 36°12′33″S 148°01′36″E
- Country: Australia
- State: Victoria
- Region: Hume
- LGA: Shire of Towong
- Location: 461 km (286 mi) NE of Melbourne; 139 km (86 mi) E of Wodonga; 17 km (11 mi) SE of Corryong

Government
  - State electorate: Benambra
  - Federal division: Indi

Population
  - Total: 34 (2016 census)
- Postcode: 3707

Towong Upper is a locality in north east Victoria, Australia. The locality is in the Shire of Towong local government area and on the Murray River, 461 kilometres (286 mi) north east of the state capital, Melbourne.

At the 2016 census, Towong Upper had a population of 34.
