= Durham Ox, Victoria =

Durham Ox Victoria
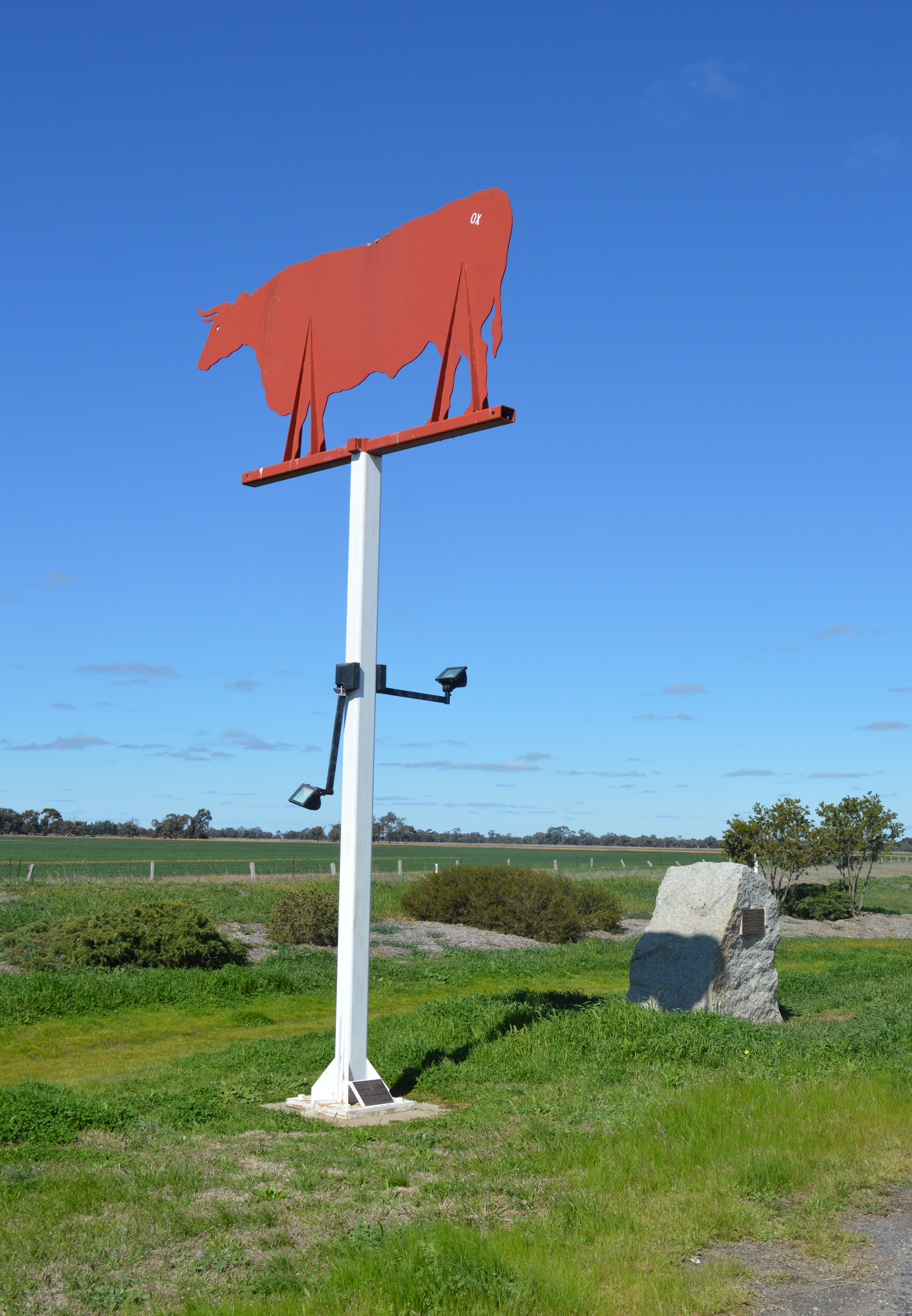
- The Durham Ox sign

- Coordinates: 36°08′0″S 143°55′0″E
- Population: 60 (2021 census)
- Established: 1848
- Postcode(s): 3576
- LGA(s): Shire of Loddon
- State electorate(s): Murray Plains
- Federal division(s): Mallee

Durham Ox is a locality in the Shire of Loddon, Victoria, Australia. It is situated on the Serpentine Creek, a tributary of the Loddon River.

== Population ==
At the 2016 census, Durham Ox had a population of 74. At the 2021 census, Durham Ox had a population of 60.

== History ==
Prior to European settlement, the area was known as Towan Gurr The Dja Dja Wurrung people are the traditional owners of this area.

Edward Argyle and Abraham Booth leased 115,000 acres of land in 1843 and established it as Duck Swamp Station. The original lease estimated the grazing capability of the area was for 2500 cattle and 8000 sheep.

Specifically, Argyle and Booth would breed Shorthorn steer, inspired by the popular Durham Ox, a famous cow from England.

In 1848, the Durham Ox Hotel was established in the area named after the steer. This pub became the focal point around which the settlement developed, effectively marking 1848 as the establishment year of the town.

A silhouette replica of the Durham Ox stands along the Loddon Valley Highway, commemorating the towns origins.

The Durham Ox store burnt down in 1996. The Durham Ox church burnt down in 2012.

In 2011, the Serpentine Creek flooded several houses, the Durham Ox Memorial Hall, the Durham Ox Church, and the historic Durham Ox Inn.

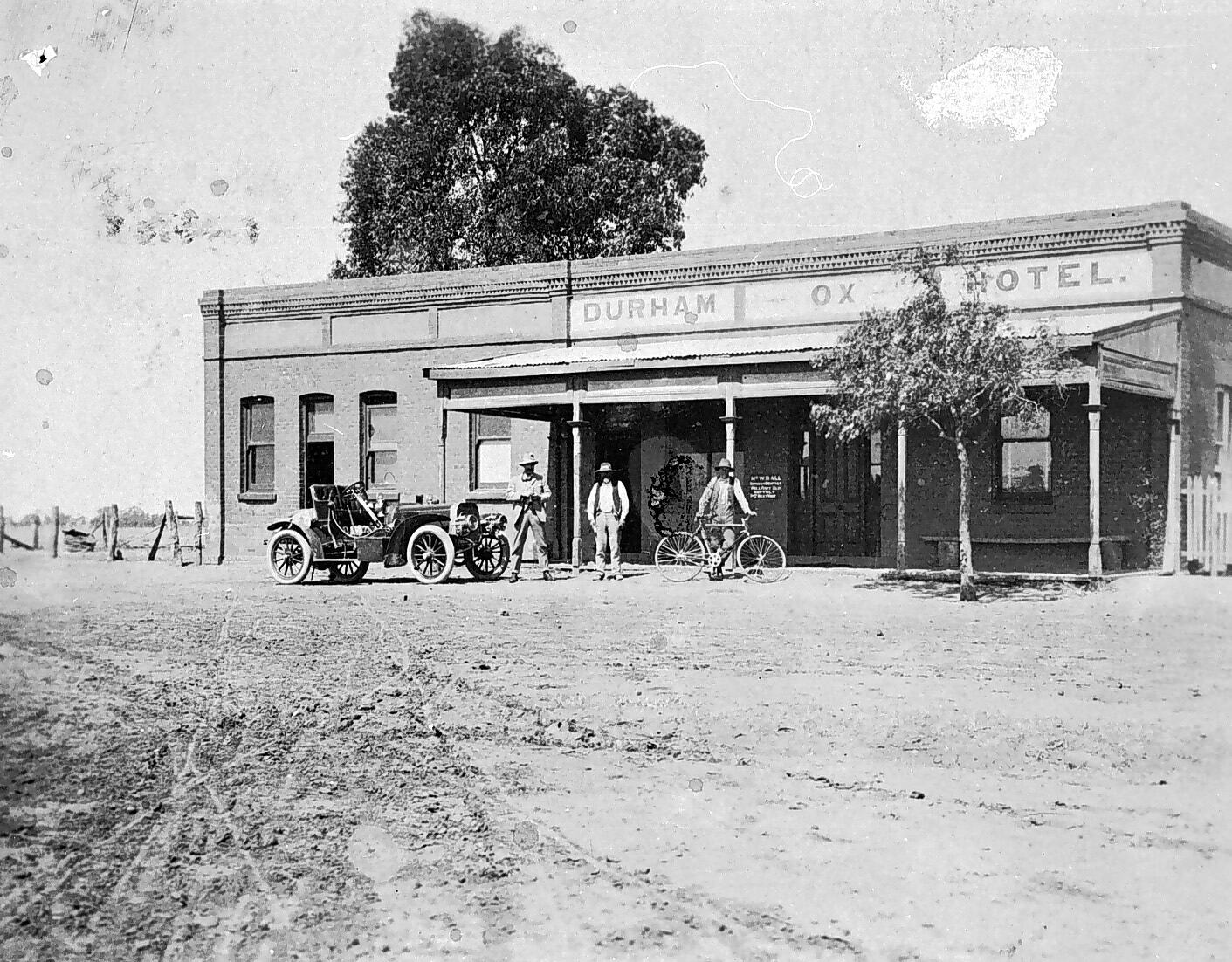
A motor car and three men in front of the Durham Ox Hotel, 1907

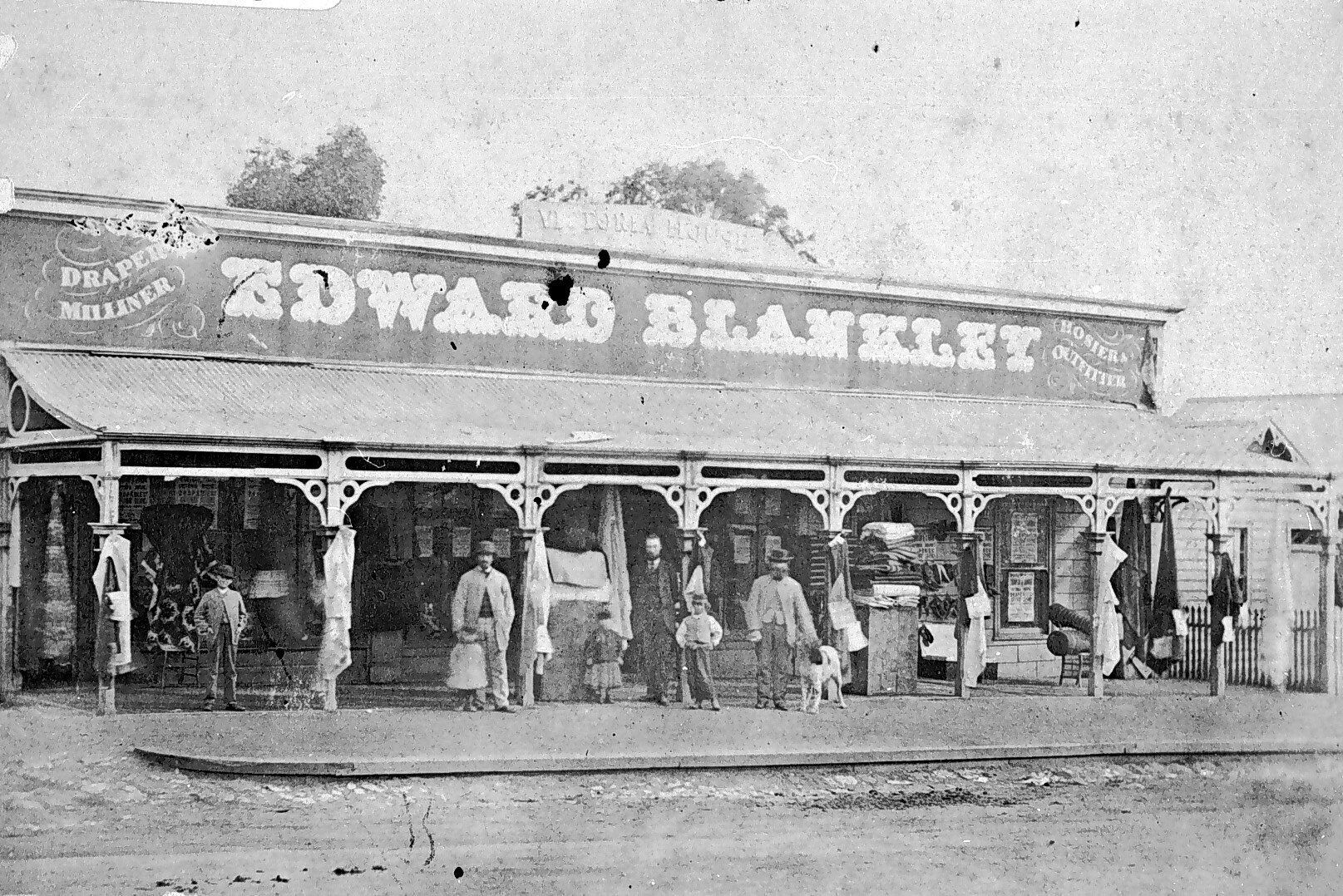
Edward Blankley 's Drapery Store, Durham Ox, Victoria, c.1875

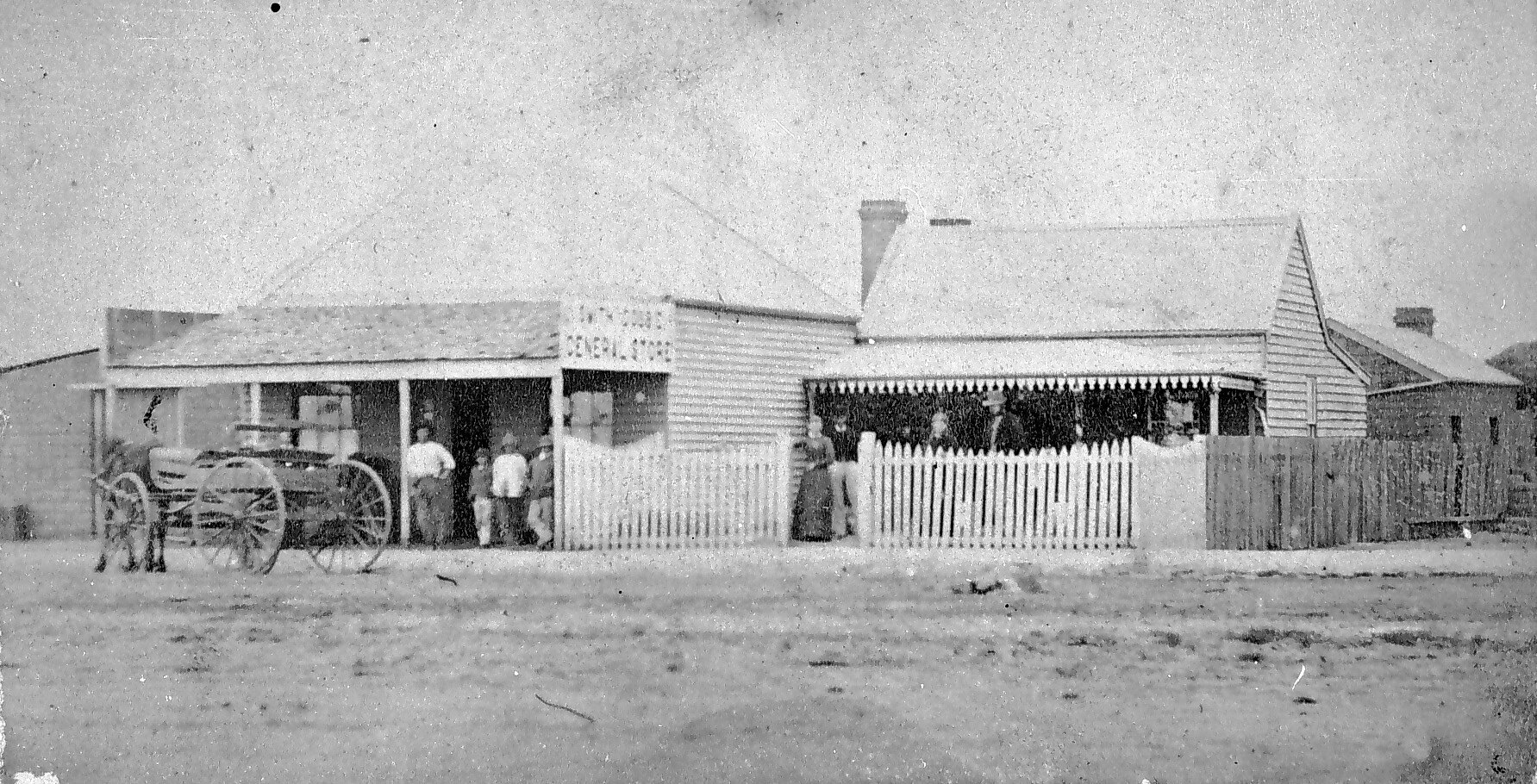
Durham Ox, Victoria, c.1875

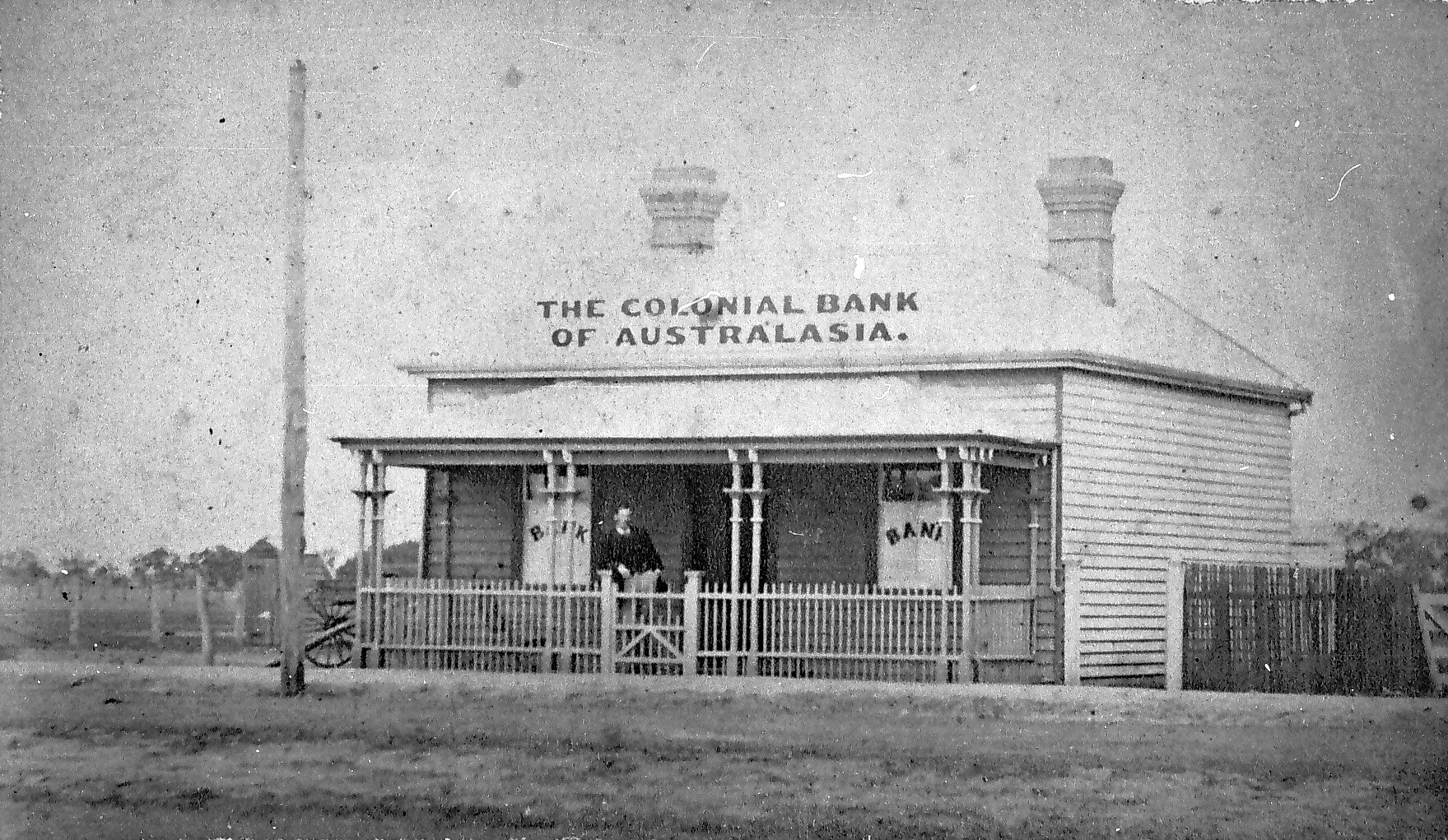
Colonial Bank of Australasia, Durham Ox, Victoria, 1882
