= Tol Tol =

Tol Tol Victoria
- Coordinates: 34°39′S 142°50′E
- Population: 142 (2016 census)
- Postcode(s): 3549
- Location: 464 km (288 mi) from Melbourne; 92 km (57 mi) from Mildura; 125 km (78 mi) from Swan Hill; 8 km (5 mi) from Robinvale
- LGA(s): Rural City of Swan Hill
Localities around Tol Tol:
Robinvale Irrigation District Section B	New South Wales	New South Wales
Robinvale Irrigation District Section D	Tol Tol	New South Wales
Robinvale Irrigation District Section E	Bannerton	Lake Powell

Tol Tol is a locality in Victoria, Australia, located approximately 8 km from Robinvale.

A Tol Tol Post Office was open between 1924 and 1926 before being replaced by Bannerton.
