= Kerang =

- Town
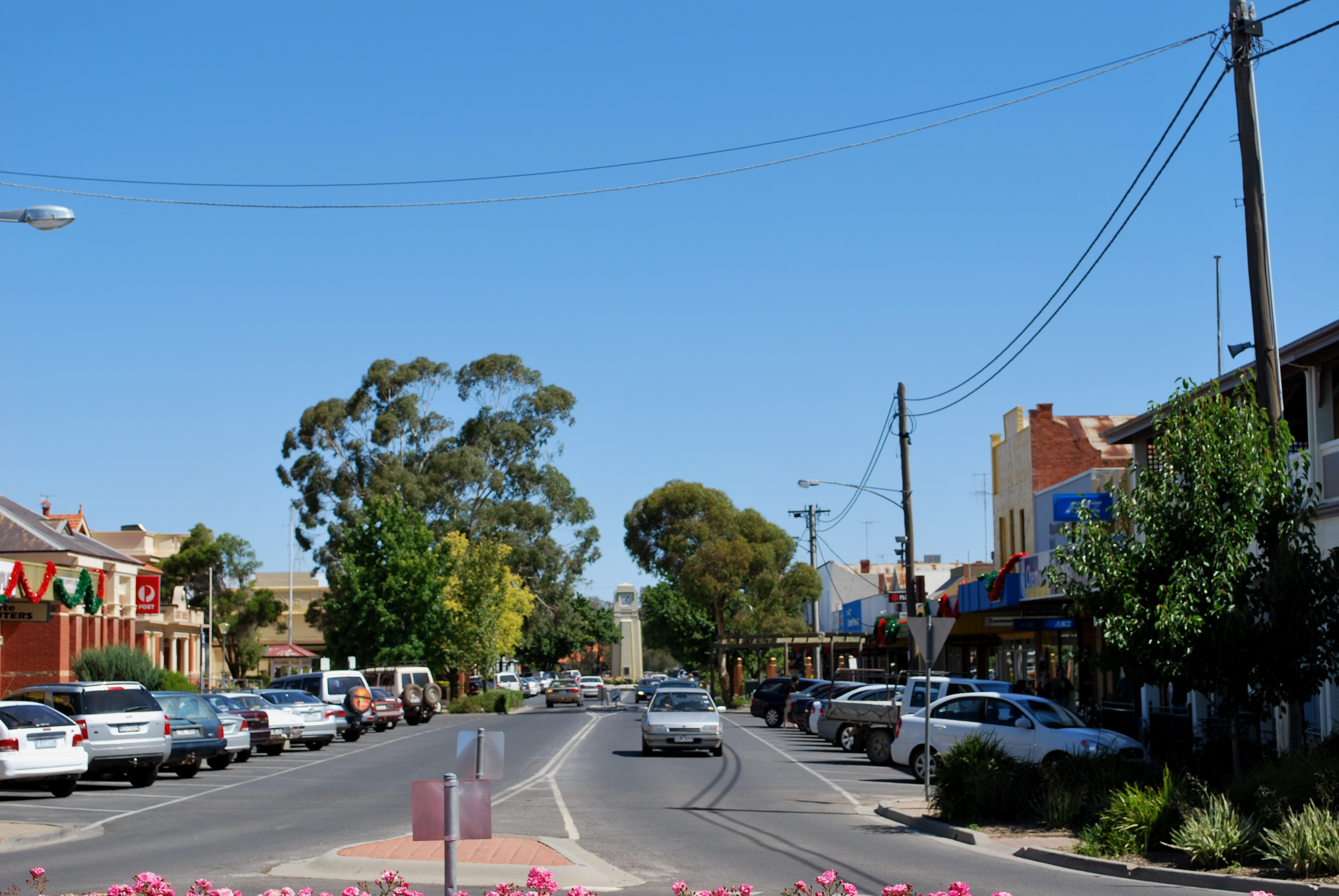
- Main street of Kerang

- Coordinates: 35°43′0″S 143°55′0″E
- Country: Australia
- State: Victoria
- LGA: Shire of Gannawarra
- Location: 277 km (172 mi) from Melbourne; 129 km (80 mi) from Bendigo; 60 km (37 mi) from Swan Hill

Government
  - State electorate: Murray Plains
  - Federal division: Mallee
- Elevation: 78 m (256 ft)

Population
  - Total: 3,960 (2021 census)
- Postcode: 3579
- Mean max temp: 22.8 °C (73.0 °F)
- Mean min temp: 9.4 °C (48.9 °F)
- Annual rainfall: 368.9 mm (14.52 in)

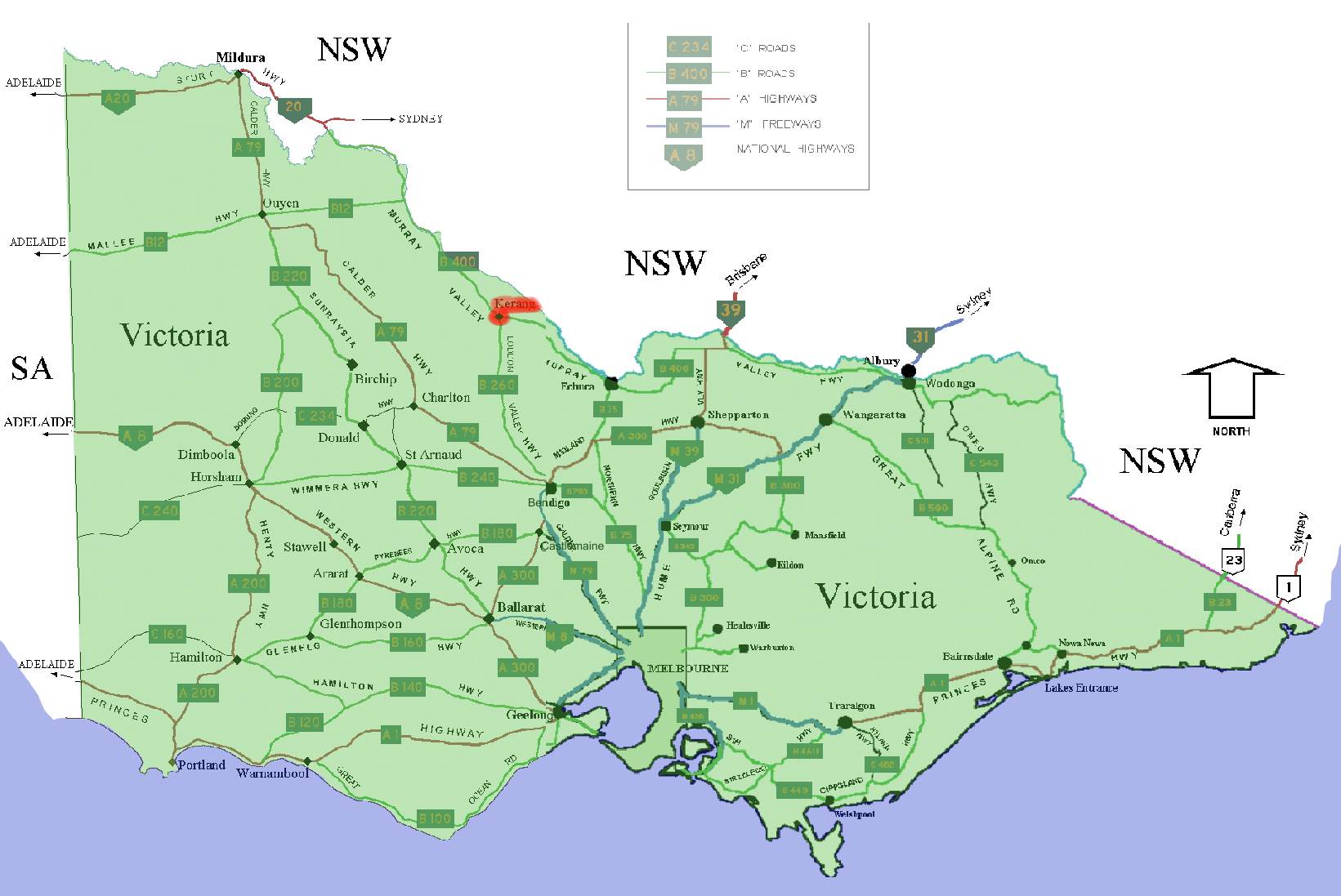
Location of Kerang in Victoria (red)

Kerang is a town on the Loddon River in north-central Victoria, Australia. It is the commercial centre to an irrigation district based on livestock, horticulture, lucerne and grain. It is located 279 kilometres (173 mi) north-west of Melbourne on the Murray Valley Highway a few kilometres north of its intersection with the Loddon Valley Highway, elevation 78 metres (256 ft). At the 2021 census, Kerang had a population of 3,960. Kerang is believed to be an Aboriginal word for Cockatoo. It is home to Australia's largest solar and battery farm, which was opened in June 2019. The 50-megawatt battery system is located outside of Kerang and stores 100 per cent renewable energy. The 2,000 solar panels have become a tourist attraction and are drawing many businesses to the town.

== History ==
The Wemba-Wemba and Barapa Barapa Aboriginal people are the original owners and the area's first occupants. Thomas Mitchell was the first European to visit the area, in 1836. Squatters began to settle in the area in 1845 and in 1848 Richard Beyes opened a public house at a river crossing near the future townsite. The gold rush of 1850 in Australia attracted the miner's sons, Peter and Anders Pettersson from Herrnäs to Australia in 1853. They emigrated with 4 other miners' sons, among them Lars Fredrik Pettersson who later took the name Westblad. A couple of hired hands also went with this first group. Lars Fredrik Westblad returned to Sweden to visit his home in Bjurtjärn socken. When he returned to Australia in 1857, two brothers went with him and later two more brothers joined them along with a cousin and a nephew.

Lars Fredrik Westblad became a justice of the peace and the owner of an inn in Mia Mia which became a gathering spot for the Swedes. With three of his brothers and four sons he operated a farm of more than 40,000 acres at Kerang, northeast of Melbourne. He did well in the cattle business.

The Westblad family in Australia reached considerable numbers and in 1976 about 300 descendants of Lars Fredrik gathered for a reunion in Kerang.

This was followed by a saddlery and a church. In 1857 Woodford Patchell built a bridge upriver from the settlement which drew traffic from the earlier settlement. He built a store, house and hotel that became the centre of what was to become Kerang. Patchell was the first farmer in the state to use irrigation and experimented with oats, barley, maize, millet, tobacco, beet, cotton and sugarcane. The Post Office opened on 29 July 1858; the current Kerang Post Office building dates from 1886 and is heritage-listed. An earlier Kerang office, quite distant, was renamed Wedderburn on the same day.

Kerang was declared a shire in 1871; at the time the settlement's population was 109. The arrival of the railway from Bendigo in 1884 and the construction of a tramway to Koondrook in 1888 led to expansion; by 1891 the population had increased to over a thousand. The spread of Patchell's irrigation ideas improved local productivity and the town continued to expand.

=== Burke and Wills ===
The Burke and Wills expedition passed through Kerang on their journey to cross Australia from Melbourne to the Gulf of Carpentaria. On Sunday, 2 September 1860 the expedition camped at Booth & Holloway's Tragowel Station to the south of Kerang. On Tuesday, 4 September 1860 they passed through Kerang, crossed the Loddon and camped at Mr. Fenton's Reedy Creek Run, making Camp XIII (their thirteenth camp since leaving Melbourne).

== Environment ==
Kerang's symbol is a flying ibis. The area around Kerang is dotted with lagoons and lakes (including Lake Tutchewop) and is believed to have the most populous ibis rookeries in the world with an estimated 200,000 ibis using the area for breeding each year, along with many other waterbirds. It is also a popular recreational destination. Many of the wetlands have been recognised by inclusion in the North Victorian Wetlands Important Bird Area and as being of international significance through listing under the Ramsar Convention.

== Transport ==
Kerang is located at the junction of the Loddon Valley and Murray Valley Highways. Air transport is provided by Kerang Airport.

The town is also on the Swan Hill railway line, served by V/Line trains from Kerang station to Melbourne, using V/Line's fleet of N Class diesel locomotives and N-Type/Z-Type carriages, as well as coach services to Balranald. The Kerang-Koondrook Tramway once linked the town to Koondrook from 1889, being closed to passengers in 1976, and closed 1981. On 5 June 2007, a semi-trailer collided with a passenger train at a level crossing, 6 kilometres (3.7 mi) north of the town, killing 11 people. This was the worst train disaster in Victoria since 1969.

== Community ==
The town has an Australian Rules football team competing in the Central Murray Football League.

Kerang has a horse racing club, the Kerang Turf Club, which schedules two race meetings a year including the Kerang Cup meeting in March.

Golfers play at the course of the Kerang Golf Club on Koondrook Road.

Kerang features a public skatepark used for skateboarding and freestyle BMX.

== Climate ==
Kerang has a cold semi-arid climate (BSk) with hot, dry summers and cool, mostly cloudy winters. An exceptionally cold summer's day had occurred on 3 February 2005, where a maximum of 11.7 °C (53.1 °F) was registered.

Climate data for Kerang (35.75°S 143.94°E, 78 m AMSL) (1903–2025)
Month	Jan	Feb	Mar	Apr	May	Jun	Jul	Aug	Sep	Oct	Nov	Dec	Year
Record high °C (°F)	47.6 (117.7)	46.9 (116.4)	42.1 (107.8)	39.1 (102.4)	28.7 (83.7)	25.6 (78.1)	25.7 (78.3)	28.1 (82.6)	36.6 (97.9)	40.0 (104.0)	44.0 (111.2)	46.6 (115.9)	47.6 (117.7)
Mean daily maximum °C (°F)	31.8 (89.2)	31.3 (88.3)	27.9 (82.2)	22.8 (73.0)	18.1 (64.6)	14.7 (58.5)	14.1 (57.4)	16.1 (61.0)	19.2 (66.6)	22.9 (73.2)	26.8 (80.2)	29.8 (85.6)	23.0 (73.3)
Mean daily minimum °C (°F)	15.3 (59.5)	15.2 (59.4)	12.9 (55.2)	9.4 (48.9)	6.7 (44.1)	4.6 (40.3)	4.0 (39.2)	4.9 (40.8)	6.6 (43.9)	8.8 (47.8)	11.4 (52.5)	13.5 (56.3)	9.4 (49.0)
Record low °C (°F)	5.6 (42.1)	5.6 (42.1)	3.3 (37.9)	0.6 (33.1)	−3.1 (26.4)	−3.9 (25.0)	−4.6 (23.7)	−3.2 (26.2)	−1.1 (30.0)	−1.1 (30.0)	2.6 (36.7)	4.1 (39.4)	−4.6 (23.7)
Average rainfall mm (inches)	24.6 (0.97)	23.1 (0.91)	26.8 (1.06)	26.4 (1.04)	35.6 (1.40)	35.7 (1.41)	34.4 (1.35)	36.5 (1.44)	35.2 (1.39)	37.4 (1.47)	30.0 (1.18)	27.8 (1.09)	373.3 (14.70)
Average rainy days (≥ 0.2 mm)	3.6	3.3	3.8	4.8	7.3	8.8	9.8	9.6	8.0	7.0	5.3	4.3	75.6
Average afternoon relative humidity (%)	31	32	36	43	56	64	63	55	49	39	34	33	45
Source: Australian Bureau of Meteorology
