= Pyramid Hill, Victoria =

Pyramid Hill
- Town
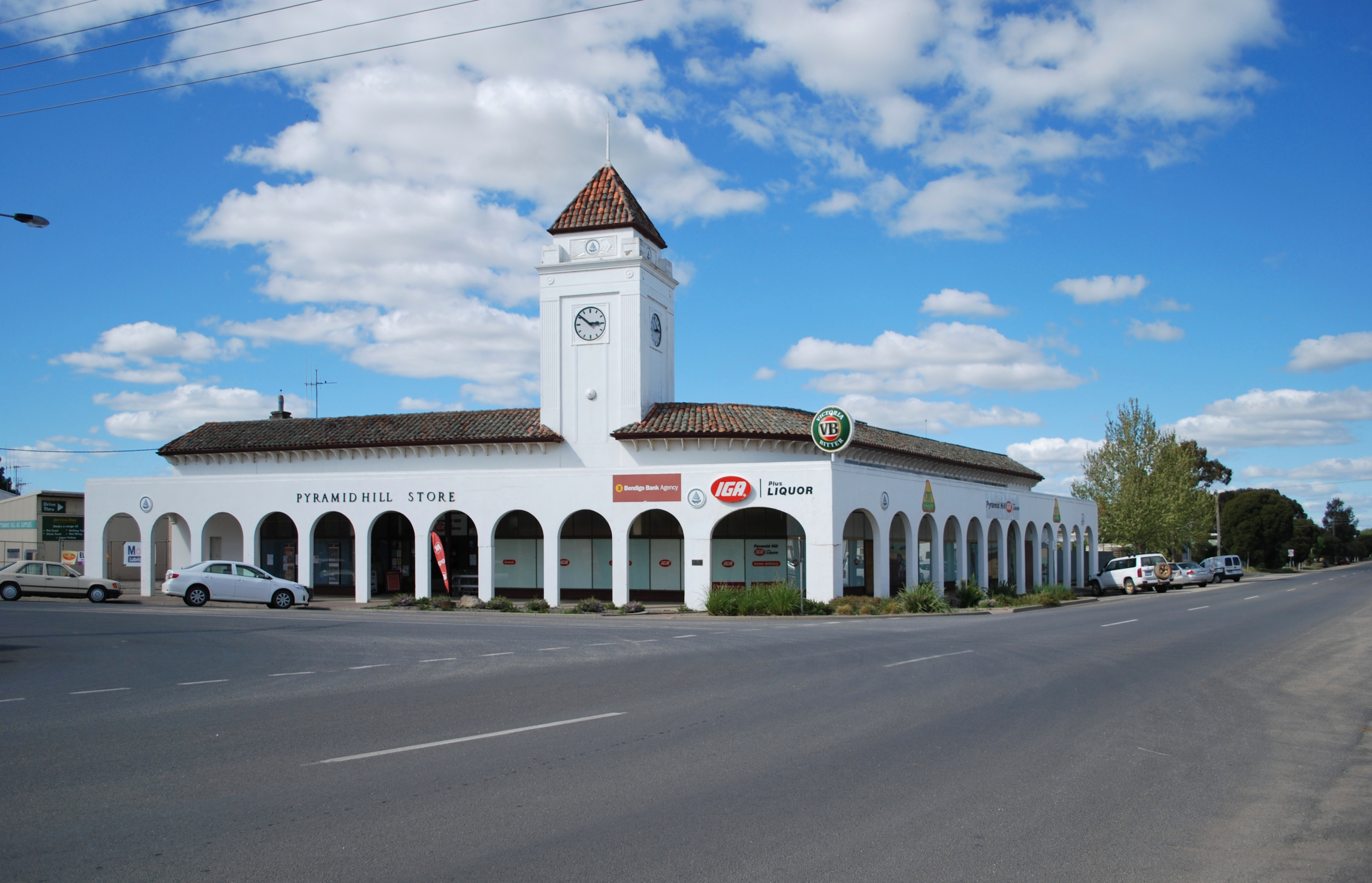
- Supermarket, built in 1933

- Coordinates: 36°04′0″S 144°08′0″E
- Country: Australia
- State: Victoria
- LGA: Shire of Loddon
- Location: 234 km (145 mi) NW of Melbourne; 86 km (53 mi) NW of Bendigo; 66 km (41 mi) W of Echuca

Government
  - State electorate: Murray Plains
  - Federal division: Mallee

Population
  - Total: 475 (UCL 2021)
- Postcode: 3575

Pyramid Hill is a town in the Shire of Loddon, Victoria, Australia, between Bendigo and Kerang. As of the 2021 census, it had a population of 598. The town, which is named for a nearby hill, has walking trails and historic Art Deco architecture.

In 1836, Major Mitchell camped at a 180-metre-high granite rise he named Pyramid Hill, since its shape reminded him of Egypt's pyramids. It became part of a pastoral area. In the 1870s, a township appeared at the hill's base. After the railway station opened in 1884, the town grew quickly and moved 3 km west of the hill. Farming accounts for over 30% of employment. In 2008, a local piggery owner visited Manila to find workers, leading Pyramid Hill to develop a small Filipino community that has revitalised not just the farms but the town itself. Pyramid Hill has a team that plays in the Loddon Valley Football Netball League, and the Filipinos host an annual cultural fiesta.

== History ==
Pyramid Hill is on the traditional lands of the Barapa Barapa.

On 28 June 1836, Thomas Mitchell, Surveyor-General of New South Wales, (Note: The land which is now Victoria was then part of the Colony of New South Wales, which virtually covered the mainland's eastern half. Victoria) spied a granite hill from Mount Hope while he was out exploring what he termed "Australia Felix", the rich plains of what is now western Victoria. It rises 187 metres (614 ft) above sea level. His party camped at that hill's foot the next day. Mitchell, the first non-Indigenous person to see the area, named the triangular rise Pyramid Hill. He wrote that, "being quite isolated, it closely resembled the monuments of Egypt."

The town is named after a nearby hill that rises 180 metres above sea level. Originally the town was situated at the base of Pyramid Hill, but was relocated when the railway station was built.

The Post Office opened on 17 November 1875. The railway arrived in 1884.

== Education ==
Pyramid Hill College, a state school, opened in 1876 and serves Foundation to Year 10 students. A Catholic school, St Patrick's Primary School, opened in 1956 and closed in 2024 due to declining enrollment.

== Sport ==
The town has an Australian Rules football team, Pyramid Hill Football Netball Club competes in the Loddon Valley Football League.

Golfers play at the course of the Pyramid Hill Golf Club on Victoria Street.

== In the media ==
The town had an FM radio station for several years which broadcast live and syndicated programmes from the Power Country FM group on the 88 MHz frequency.

Sue Brooks, a former Pyramid Hill resident, directed the film Road to Nhill (1997). Set and filmed in Pyramid Hill, it is based on both an actual incident and the heavily embellished yarns her father would spin about the town. Road to Nhill toured regional Victorian cities to gross $1 million. Pyramid Hill and Nhill were featured on a Back Roads episode that depicted its Filipino community.

Road to Nhill (1997) was set and filmed in Pyramid Hill.

== Demographics ==
In the 2021 census, Pyramid Hill had a population of 598.
