= Robinvale =

- Town
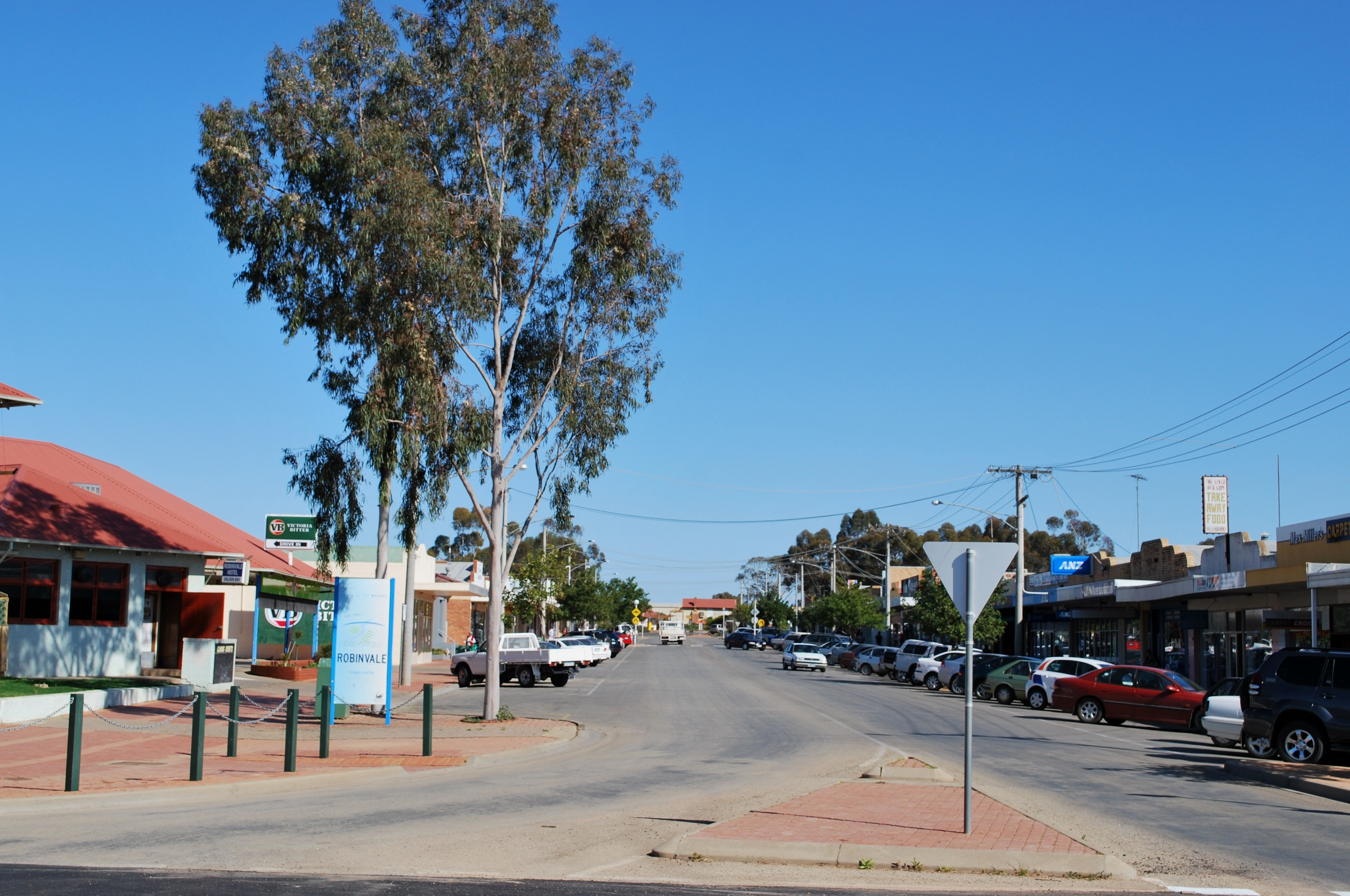
- Perrin Street, the main street of Robinvale, 2009

- Interactive map of Robinvale
- Coordinates: 34°35′S 142°46′E
- Country: Australia
- State: Victoria
- LGA: Rural City of Swan Hill
- Location: 469 km (291 mi) NW of Melbourne; 478 km (297 mi) E of Adelaide; 92 km (57 mi) SE of Mildura

Government
  - State electorate: Mildura
  - Federal division: Mallee

Area
  - Total: 70.1 km^{2} (27.1 sq mi)
- Elevation: 61 m (200 ft)

Population
  - Total: 3,740 (2021 census)
  - Density: 53.35/km^{2} (138.18/sq mi)
- Postcode: 3549
- Mean max temp: 24.0 °C (75.2 °F)
- Mean min temp: 9.5 °C (49.1 °F)
- Annual rainfall: 311.2 mm (12.25 in)
Localities around Robinvale
New South Wales	New South Wales	New South Wales
New South Wales	Robinvale	Tol Tol
Happy Valley	Bannerton	Tol Tol

Robinvale is a town on the south bank of the Murray River in north western Victoria, Australia. It is connected by a bridge to Euston on the other side of the river in New South Wales. At the 2021 census, Robinvale had a population of 3,740, but a population study conducted by the Rural City of Swan Hill in 2019 identified that Robinvale had an estimated population of between 7,000 in November and 8,800 in March each year. This is due to a large migrant population, with people seasonally employed on nearby farms.

== History ==
The Robinvale region is home to at least five indigenous groups with traditional ownership belonging to people from the Latji Latji and Dadi Dadi people. The region, particularly Bumbang Island houses a large number of culturally significant sites and heritage items. The town is named in memory of Lieutenant George Robin Cuttle, who was killed in action during air combat over France in 1918. The Post Office opened in 1924 as Bumbang, but was renamed Robinvale in August of that year.

Robinvale was connected to the rest of the Victorian railway network when the line from Manangatang was opened in 1924. Work began in the 1920s on a 37-mile (60 km) extension of the line across the Murray River to Lette in New South Wales. It was never completed, and work was officially abandoned in 1943. The combined rail-road bridge across the river at Robinvale, which was constructed as part of the project, continued to be used until 2006, when a new road bridge was opened. The lifting span of the former rail-road bridge has been placed in a nearby park, as a permanent historical display.

Lock 15 on the Murray River is just downstream of the town providing a pool of irrigation water and ensuring that the river near Robinvale is permanently available for water activities such as water skiing. The weir and lock were completed in 1937, the last one built on the Murray (Locks 12–14 and 16–25 were never built).

The town, fictionalised as "Sunray", was the setting of the 1996 Australian feature film Love Serenade, directed by Shirley Barrett, which won the Caméra d'Or award at the 1996 Cannes Film Festival.

== Today ==
Robinvale is known for production of grapes, olives, carrots and almonds.

There are many attractions in Robinvale, such as the original home of Robin Cuttle, an antique museum, park, and a caravan park overlooking the Murray River. The river is home to a great array of native birds and fish such as the pelican, swan, perch and the murray cod.

Robinvale is a popular camping area on the Murray.

Robinvale has a rail line that is used seasonally by Pacific National freight trains. V/Line runs coach services to Swan Hill and Mildura, Victoria, connecting with train services to Melbourne at Swan Hill railway station. Robinvale Airport serves the town.

Robinvale and its twin town, Euston is home to an Italian population from the southern region of Calabria in Italy. It also has immigrant populations of Tongans and Vietnamese and a significant Aboriginal community, with Aboriginal people making up 8.1% of the population as of 2016 . Robinvale also had an irrigation project funded by Lower Murray Water, completed in late 2010.

== Sister city ==
Robinvale is a sister city with the town of Villers-Bretonneux in the Somme department in Picardy in northern France.

== Sport ==
Robinvale hosts numerous sporting events, Tennis including an Easter tournament, football, cricket, Netball, Basketball and the annual Robinvale Ski Race on the Murray River. The town has an Australian Rules football & Netball team the Robinvale Euston Eagles competing in the Sunraysia Football Netball League. AFL players who've played for the club include Brownlow Medalist John James, Kevin Curran, Ivan Smith, Dick Vandenberg, Des McKenzie, Pat Curran and Phil Egan, along with cricketer Jamie Siddons.

Rugby League is also played with local club Robinvale Storm participating in the Sunraysia Rugby League competition.

Golfers play at the course of the Robinvale Golf Club on the Murray Valley Highway.

== Media ==
=== Radio ===
The radio stations that broadcast to the town are ABC Goulburn Murray, Triple M The Border, Hit104.9 The Border, and Hot FM, a community based station.

=== Television ===
Robinvale is part of the Albury-Wodonga/Murray/North-East Victoria television market and has access to all major TV networks. Channels available include Channel 7 (formerly Prime7 and part of the Seven Network), WIN Television (part of the Nine Network), 10 Regional Victoria (part of Network 10), as well as the Australian Broadcasting Corporation (ABC) and the Special Broadcasting Service, more commonly known as SBS. Several of these networks also offer additional digital-only channels, including ABC Family, ABC Entertains, ABC News, SBS Viceland, 7two, 7mate, 7bravo, 7flix, 10 Drama, 10 Comedy, Nickelodeon, Sky News Regional, 9Gem, 9Go! and 9Life.

Two television news bulletins featuring local content are offered in Albury–Wodonga and the surrounding region. The Seven Network broadcasts its bulletin live at 6.00pm from studios in Canberra. WIN Television's bulletin is produced in Ballarat but features Albury–Wodonga region based content, and airs on delay at 6.30pm. Network 10 also provides short local news updates which are produced in Hobart, Tasmania, however, these do not feature significant local content from the Albury–Wodonga region.

=== Newspapers ===
The town is served by The Robinvale Sentinel.

== Climate ==
Robinvale has a cold semi-arid climate (Köppen BSk), slightly cooler than Mildura due to its southern latitude. Although largely uniform, rainfall peaks somewhat in the cooler months of the year. Rainfall records are found as early as 1877, while those of temperature from 1907 with both terminating at 1970. Extreme temperature records were only kept for maxima, and in these records a reading of 48.7 °C (119.7 °F) was registered on 13 January 1939.

Climate data were sourced at Euston Post Office just over the bridge into New South Wales.

Climate data for Euston Post Office (1907−1970, rainfall to 1877); 61 m AMSL; 34.58° S, 142.73° E
Month	Jan	Feb	Mar	Apr	May	Jun	Jul	Aug	Sep	Oct	Nov	Dec	Year
Mean daily maximum °C (°F)	32.5 (90.5)	32.1 (89.8)	28.9 (84.0)	23.5 (74.3)	19.0 (66.2)	15.4 (59.7)	15.2 (59.4)	17.3 (63.1)	20.8 (69.4)	24.3 (75.7)	27.9 (82.2)	31.0 (87.8)	24.0 (75.2)
Mean daily minimum °C (°F)	15.8 (60.4)	15.7 (60.3)	13.0 (55.4)	8.9 (48.0)	6.1 (43.0)	3.9 (39.0)	3.1 (37.6)	4.1 (39.4)	6.8 (44.2)	9.5 (49.1)	12.3 (54.1)	14.6 (58.3)	9.5 (49.1)
Average rainfall mm (inches)	19.7 (0.78)	22.2 (0.87)	21.5 (0.85)	22.2 (0.87)	29.9 (1.18)	34.0 (1.34)	25.8 (1.02)	29.9 (1.18)	29.3 (1.15)	30.5 (1.20)	24.4 (0.96)	21.8 (0.86)	311.2 (12.25)
Average rainy days (≥ 0.2 mm)	2.6	2.7	3.2	4.0	5.9	7.7	7.6	8.1	6.7	5.8	4.1	3.2	61.6
