= Electoral results for the Division of Echuca =

Australian division election results

This is a list of electoral results for the Division of Echuca in Australian federal elections from the division's creation in 1901 until its abolition in 1937.

== Members ==
Member	Party	Term
James McColl	Protectionist	1901–1904
James McColl	Free Trade/Anti-Socialist	1904–1906
Albert Palmer	Anti-Socialist	1906–1909
Albert Palmer	Liberal	1909–1917
Albert Palmer	Nationalist	1917–1919
William Hill	Victorian Farmers' Union/Country	1919–1934
John McEwen	Country	1934–1937

== Election results ==
=== Elections in the 1930s ===
==== 1934 ====
1934 Australian federal election: Echuca
Party	Candidate	Votes	%	±%
Labor	William Hartshorne	12,407	29.2	+29.2
Country	John McEwen	11,371	26.7	+31.1
Country	Galloway Stewart	10,075	23.7	+23.7
Country	William Moss	8,663	20.4	+20.4
Total formal votes		42,516	97.4	
Informal votes		1,132	2.6	
Turnout		43,648	95.1	
Two-party-preferred result
Country	John McEwen	27,599	64.9	
Country	Galloway Stewart	14,917	35.1	
Country hold		Swing		

==== 1931 ====
1931 Australian federal election: Echuca
Party	Candidate	Votes	%	±%
Country	William Hill	16,116	39.7	−14.0
Independent Country	Galloway Stewart	14,278	35.2	+35.2
Independent Country	William Moss	8,020	19.8	+19.8
Ind. United Australia	John Fitzpatrick	2,168	5.3	+5.3
Total formal votes		40,582	96.7	
Informal votes		1,376	3.3	
Turnout		41,958	95.6	
Two-party-preferred result
Country	William Hill	21,278	52.4	−1.3
Independent	Galloway Stewart	19,304	47.6	+47.6
Country hold		Swing	−1.3	

=== Elections in the 1920s ===
==== 1929 ====
1929 Australian federal election: Echuca
Party	Candidate	Votes	%	±%
Country	William Hill	21,750	53.7	−6.3
Labor	Edward Hill	18,734	46.3	+46.3
Total formal votes		40,484	98.3	
Informal votes		712	1.7	
Turnout		41,196	96.1	
Country hold		Swing	−6.3	

==== 1928 ====
1928 Australian federal election: Echuca
Party	Candidate	Votes	%	±%
Country	William Hill	23,265	60.0	−5.3
Country Progressive	Frederick Churches	15,486	40.0	+40.0
Total formal votes		38,751	96.8	
Informal votes		1,263	3.2	
Turnout		40,014	94.4	
Country hold		Swing	−5.3	

==== 1925 ====
1925 Australian federal election: Echuca
Party	Candidate	Votes	%	±%
Country	William Hill	25,321	65.3	−5.0
Labor	Patrick O'Hanlon	13,451	34.7	+34.7
Total formal votes		38,772	98.5	
Informal votes		576	1.5	
Turnout		39,348	93.4	
Country hold		Swing	−5.0	

==== 1922 ====
1922 Australian federal election: Echuca
Party	Candidate	Votes	%	±%
Country	William Hill	13,991	70.3	+27.0
Nationalist	James Stewart	5,914	29.7	−3.4
Total formal votes		19,905	95.9	
Informal votes		854	4.1	
Turnout		20,759	52.2	
Country hold		Swing	+27.0	

=== Elections in the 1910s ===
==== 1919 ====
1919 Australian federal election: Echuca
Party	Candidate	Votes	%	±%
Victorian Farmers	William Hill	11,411	43.3	+43.3
Nationalist	James Stewart	8,734	33.1	−27.6
Labor	Edward Russell	6,218	23.6	−15.7
Total formal votes		26,363	96.9	
Informal votes		852	3.1	
Turnout		27,215	76.9	
Two-party-preferred result
Victorian Farmers	William Hill	16,878	64.0	+64.0
Nationalist	James Stewart	9,485	36.0	−24.7
Victorian Farmers hold		Swing	+24.7	

1919 Echuca by-election
Party	Candidate	Votes	%	±%
Victorian Farmers	William Hill	13,800	68.8	+68.8
Nationalist	Frederick Purcell	4,848	24.2	−36.5
Ind. Nationalist	Edwin Purbrick	1,418	7.1	+7.1
Total formal votes		20,066	97.2	
Informal votes		572	2.8	
Turnout		20,638	59.5	
Two-party-preferred result
Victorian Farmers	William Hill		72.3	+72.3
Nationalist	Frederick Purcell		27.7	−33.0
Victorian Farmers gain from Nationalist		Swing	+33.0	

==== 1917 ====
1917 Australian federal election: Echuca
Party	Candidate	Votes	%	±%
Nationalist	Albert Palmer	17,585	60.7	+2.5
Labor	Thomas Power	11,371	39.3	−2.5
Total formal votes		28,956	98.1	
Informal votes		554	1.9	
Turnout		29,510	83.3	
Nationalist hold		Swing	+2.5	

==== 1914 ====
1914 Australian federal election: Echuca
Party	Candidate	Votes	%	±%
Liberal	Albert Palmer	16,805	58.2	+0.6
Labor	James Gourley	12,053	41.8	+6.1
Total formal votes		28,858	98.0	
Informal votes		589	2.0	
Turnout		29,447	80.7	
Liberal hold		Swing	−2.8	

==== 1913 ====
1913 Australian federal election: Echuca
Party	Candidate	Votes	%	±%
Liberal	Albert Palmer	15,618	57.6	+14.0
Labor	Chris Fitzgerald	9,692	35.7	+25.0
Independent	Egbert England	1,811	6.7	+6.7
Total formal votes		27,121	97.4	
Informal votes		734	2.6	
Turnout		27,885	74.0	
Liberal hold		Swing	+10.6	

==== 1910 ====
1910 Australian federal election: Echuca
Party	Candidate	Votes	%	±%
Liberal	Albert Palmer	7,881	43.7	−56.3
Independent	William Orr	7,757	43.0	+43.0
Independent	Anthony O'Dwyer	1,188	6.6	+6.6
Independent Liberal	William Everard	1,052	5.8	+5.8
Independent Liberal	John Davies	168	0.9	+0.9
Total formal votes		18,046	97.4	
Informal votes		476	2.6	
Turnout		18,522	62.4	
Liberal hold		Swing	−56.3	

=== Elections in the 1900s ===
1907 Echuca by-election
Party	Candidate	Votes	%	±%
Anti-Socialist	Albert Palmer	11,618	52.6	+2.5
Protectionist	Thomas Kennedy	10,481	47.4	−2.5
Total formal votes		22,099	99.0	
Informal votes		230	1.0	
Turnout		22,329	71.5	
Anti-Socialist hold		Swing	+2.5	

==== 1906 ====
1906 Australian federal election: Echuca
Party	Candidate	Votes	%	±%
Anti-Socialist	Albert Palmer	7,656	50.1	+13.4
Protectionist	Thomas Kennedy	7,624	49.9	−13.4
Total formal votes		15,280	94.6	
Informal votes		867	5.4	
Turnout		16,147	55.3	
Anti-Socialist gain from Protectionist		Swing	+13.4	

==== 1903 ====
1903 Australian federal election: Echuca
Party	Candidate	Votes	%	±%
Protectionist	James McColl	5,511	63.3	+9.3
Free Trade	Henry Williams	3,188	36.7	−9.3
Total formal votes		8,699	97.2	
Informal votes		254	2.8	
Turnout		8,953	44.3	
Protectionist hold		Swing	+9.3	

==== 1901 ====
1901 Australian federal election: Echuca
Party	Candidate	Votes	%	±%
Protectionist	James McColl	3,632	54.0	+54.0
Free Trade	Max Hirsch	3,091	46.0	+46.0
Total formal votes		6,723	99.3	
Informal votes		48	0.7	
Turnout		6,771	59.6	
Protectionist win		(new seat)		
