= Electoral results for the Division of Moira =

Australian division election results

This is a list of electoral results for the Division of Moira in Australian federal elections from the division's creation in 1901 until its abolition in 1906.

== Members ==
Member	Party	Term
Thomas Kennedy	Protectionist	1901–1906

== Election results ==
=== Elections in the 1900s ===
==== 1903 ====
1903 Australian federal election: Moira
Party	Candidate	Votes	%	±%
Protectionist	Thomas Kennedy	5,385	54.0	−2.2
Free Trade	Albert Palmer	4,590	46.0	+2.2
Total formal votes		9,975	98.5	
Informal votes		156	1.5	
Turnout		10,131	48.3	
Protectionist hold		Swing	−2.2	

==== 1901 ====
1901 Australian federal election: Moira
Party	Candidate	Votes	%	±%
Protectionist	Thomas Kennedy	2,883	56.2	+56.2
Free Trade	John West	2,251	43.8	+43.8
Total formal votes		5,134	99.2	
Informal votes		44	0.4	
Turnout		5,178	50.8	
Protectionist win		(new seat)		
