= Hugh MacColl (disambiguation) =

Hugh MacColl (1831–1909), Scottish mathematician

Hugh MacColl may also refer to:

- Hugh MacColl (footballer), Scottish footballer

== See also ==
- Hugh McColl (born 1935), Scottish businessman
- Hugh McColl (pioneer) (1819–1885), Scottish politician
