= 1919 Echuca by-election =

20 September 1919
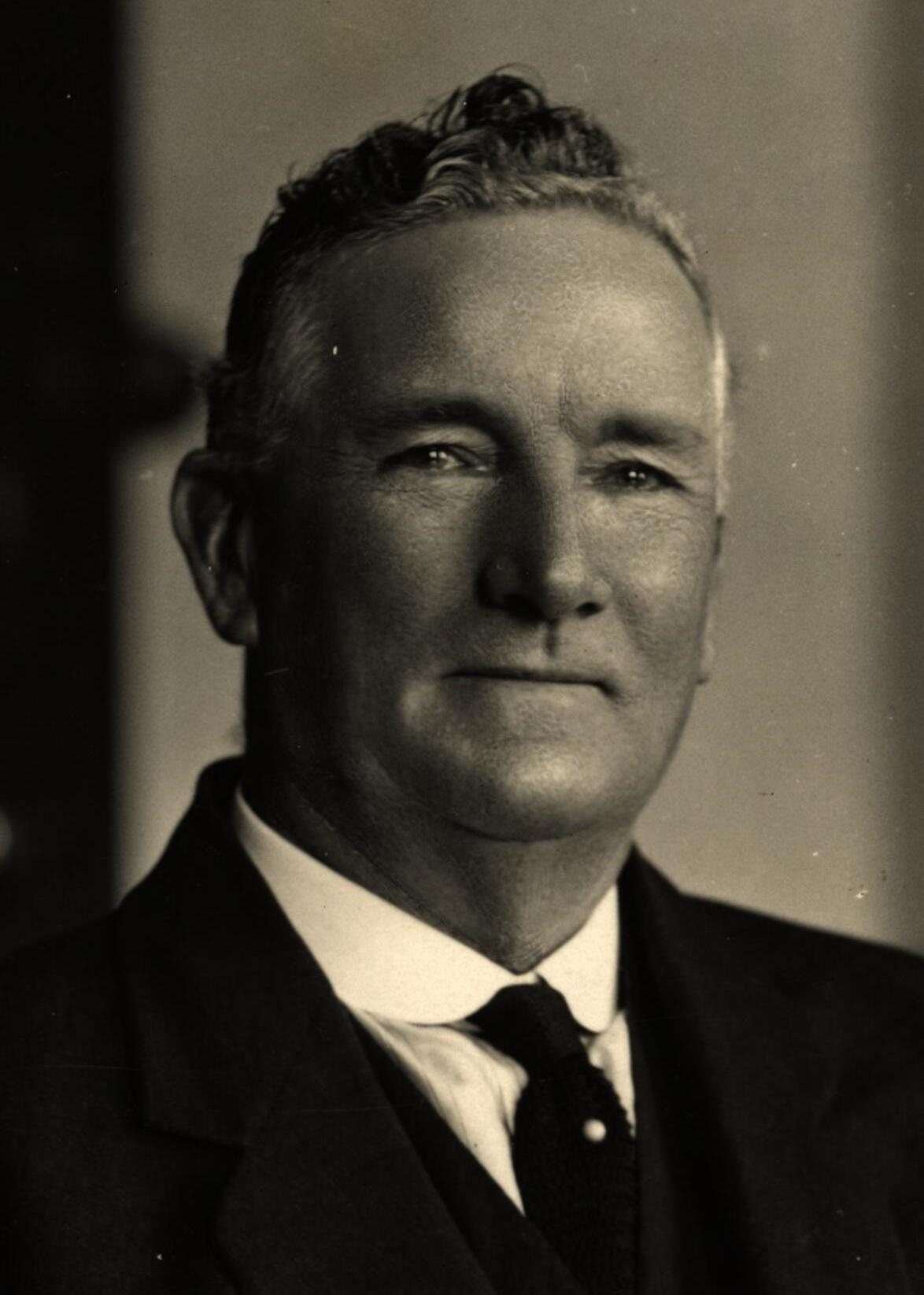
	First party	Second party
		NAT
Candidate	William Hill	Frederick Purcell
Party	Victorian Farmers	Nationalist
Popular vote	13,800	4,848
Percentage	68.8%	24.2%
Swing	▲68.8pp	▼36.5pp
TPP	72.3%	27.7%
TPP swing	▲72.3pp	▼33.0pp
MP before election
Albert Palmer
Nationalist
Elected MP
William Hill
Victorian Farmers

A by-election was held for the Australian House of Representatives seat of Echuca on 20 September 1919. This was triggered by the death of Nationalist MP Albert Palmer.

The by-election was won by William Hill, endorsed by the Victorian Farmers' Union, who became the second "Country" member of the Parliament following William Gibson's victory in the 1918 Corangamite by-election.

== Results ==
1919 Echuca by-election
Party	Candidate	Votes	%	±%
Victorian Farmers	William Hill	13,800	68.8	+68.8
Nationalist	Frederick Purcell	4,848	24.2	–36.5
Ind. Nationalist	Edwin Purbrick	1,418	7.1	+7.1
Total formal votes		20,066	97.2	
Informal votes		572	2.8	
Turnout		20,638	59.5	
Two-party-preferred result
Victorian Farmers	William Hill		72.3	+72.3
Nationalist	Frederick Purcell		27.7	–33.0
Victorian Farmers gain from Nationalist		Swing	+33.0	
