= Annie McEwen =

Australian activist

Dame Annie McEwen DBE (née Ann Mills McLeod; 1896/1900 – 10 February 1967) was an Australian social activist, and the wife of John McEwen (who after her death became Prime Minister of Australia). She was active in the Country Party and devoted her life to working for the public good.

== Early life and activism ==
Born in Tongala, Victoria as Ann Mills McLeod in either 1896 or 1900, she was educated at Girton Church of England Girls' Grammar School in Bendigo. She married John McEwen on 21 September 1921 at Ballavoca, Tongala. They had no children. She was an experienced farmer and, with her husband, developed the soldier settler property. They sold it and bought others, to eventually hold 3,000 acres (1,200 ha) in the Stanhope area.

A skilled organiser, she raised funds for local causes and was an active member of the Country Women's Association in Victoria. She was appointed a Life Governor of Melbourne's Prince Henry's Hospital for her many years of voluntary work there. She was also an active figure in the Country Party and remained so in the period of McEwen's expulsion from the party from 1938 to 1943. She spoke at women's meetings and was a key organiser in the Country Party during the early stages of her husband's political career.

She drove thousands of miles through Victoria to political meetings while her husband worked on his speeches in the back seat of his car. He was elected to the Federal Parliament in 1934 as a member for Echuca. He later held the seats of Indi from 1937 to 1949 and Murray from 1949 to 1971, when he retired from politics. He became the leader of the Country Party in 1958.

While her husband was Minister for Air, Annie McEwen arranged for the care of young Royal Australian Air Force recruits from other states who were training at the Flying School at Point Cook. She continued this work during the war and took over an old mansion in the Melbourne suburb of Toorak as a recreation centre. She was also a founding member of the White Wings Auxiliary, a group formed to support the Women's Auxiliary Australian Air Force (WAAAF), established in 1941 when her husband was Minister for Air.

== Last years and death ==
On 1 January 1966, she was made a Dame Commander of the Order of the British Empire (DBE) in recognition of her long and active service in public life and for country people. An invalid for many years, she received the award from the Governor-General Lord Casey at a private investiture at her home in Toorak.

== Death ==
Dame Annie McEwen died at home in Toorak on 10 February 1967 following a long illness. She did not live to see her husband become the Prime Minister of Australia for three weeks after the disappearance of Harold Holt in December 1967.
