= Shire of Wangaratta (Victoria) =

Coordinates: 36°12′S 146°14′E

Shire of Wangaratta Victoria
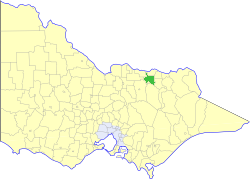
- Location in Victoria
- The Shire of Wangaratta as at its dissolution in 1994
- Population: 3,180 (1992)
  - Density: 3.459/km^{2} (8.960/sq mi)
- Established: 1863
- Area: 919.24 km^{2} (354.9 sq mi)
- Council seat: Wangaratta
- Region: Hume
- County: Bogong, Moira
LGAs around Shire of Wangaratta:
Yarrawonga	Rutherglen	Chiltern
Tungamah	Shire of Wangaratta	Beechworth
Benalla	Oxley	Oxley

The Shire of Wangaratta was a local government area about 260 kilometres (162 mi) northeast of Melbourne, the state capital of Victoria, Australia. The shire covered an area of 919.24 square kilometres (354.9 sq mi), and existed from 1863 until 1994. The Shire did not include Wangaratta itself, which was governed by a separate local government.

== History ==
Wangaratta was first incorporated as the North Ovens Road District on 10 June 1863, which became a shire on 17 September 1867. Part of the Mokoan Riding of the Shire of Benalla was annexed as the Killawarra Riding on 31 May 1906. The shire was renamed Wangaratta on 22 November 1916.

On 18 November 1994, the Shire of Wangaratta was abolished, and along with the City of Wangaratta, the Shire of Oxley and various surrounding districts, was merged into the newly created Rural City of Wangaratta.

== Wards ==
Wangaratta was divided into four ridings, each of which elected three councillors:

- Boorhaman Riding
- Central Riding
- Killawarra Riding
- Tarrawingee Riding

== Towns and localities ==
- Boorhaman
- Boralma
- Bowser
- Eldorado
- Everton
- Killawarra
- Londrigan
- Peechelba
- Springhurst
- Tarrawingee

== Population ==
Year	Population
1954	2,267
1958	2,320*
1961	2,140
1966	1,952
1971	1,866
1976	2,266
1981	2,475
1986	3,039
1991	3,150

* Estimate in the 1958 Victorian Year Book.
