= Shire of Yackandandah =

Coordinates: 36°19′S 146°50′E

- Local government area
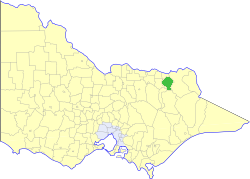
- Location in Victoria

- The Shire of Yackandandah as at its dissolution in 1994
- Country: Australia
- State: Victoria
- Region: Hume
- Established: 1862
- Council seat: Yackandandah

Area
  - Total: 1,148.75 km^{2} (443.53 sq mi)

Population
  - Total: 4,660 (1992)
  - Density: 4.057/km^{2} (10.507/sq mi)
- County: Bogong
LGAs around Shire of Yackandandah
Chiltern	Wodonga	Tallangatta
Beechworth	Shire of Yackandandah	Tallangatta
Myrtleford	Bright	Tallangatta

The Shire of Yackandandah was a local government area about 290 kilometres (180 mi) northeast of Melbourne, the state capital of Victoria, Australia. The shire covered an area of 1,148.75 square kilometres (443.5 sq mi), and existed from 1862 until 1994.

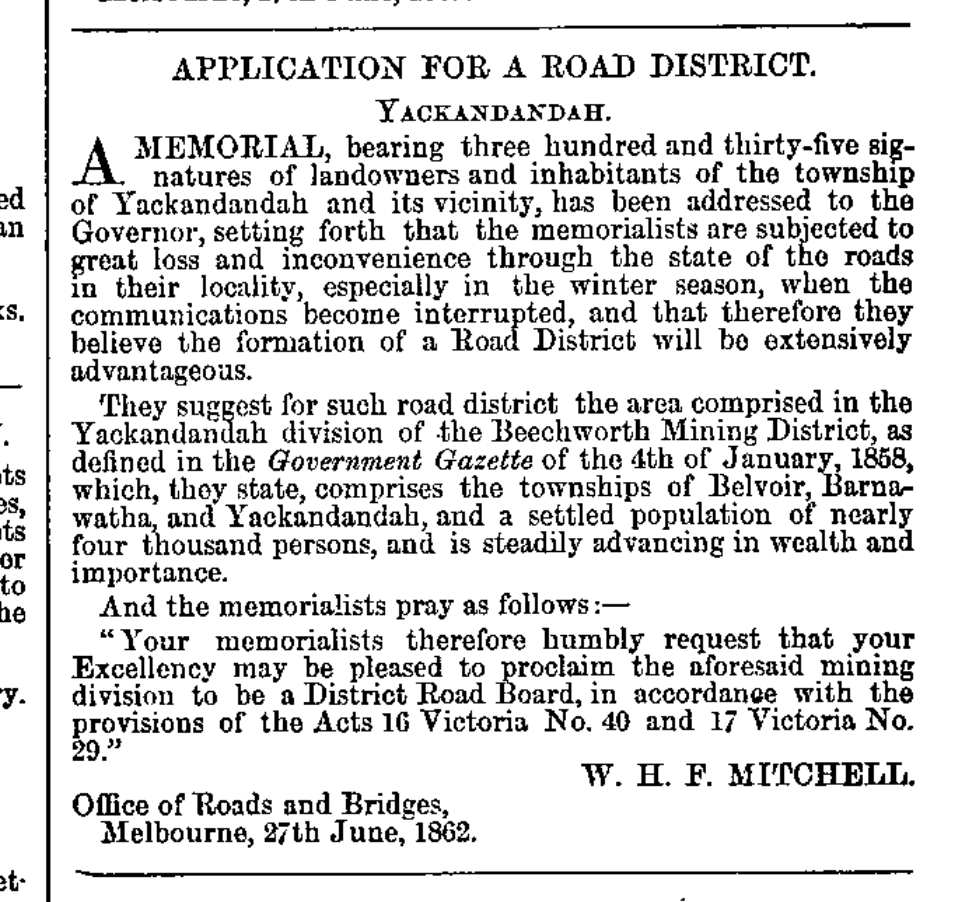
Victorian Government Gazette, 27 June 1862

== History ==
=== Road District ===
Yackandandah residents began the process towards the establishment of a road district on 8 August 1862. The rate roll was confirmed on 5 May 1863.

At the meeting on 3 March 1863, the board members present were W. Welshman, (chair), Power, Robinson, Osborne, McIlree, and D Mongan. The meeting agreed to develop plans to improve 'the three worst gullies on the Gap road, between Beechworth' and Yackandandah. The Board was collecting tolls on the punt across the Little (Kiewa) River.

At the April meeting the Board received a memorial from the township inhabitants, 'stating that they would consent to pay double the assessment for the present year, if improvements were made' to prevent the stores in town from being flooded.

On 27 March 1863 Yackandandah Board (along with several other Boards around the State) received a grant of £1,000 from the Government.

The terms of the members of the first Board ended on 10 September 1863.

The next election for the Board was held at the Clarence Hotel on 18 March 1864. Among the members of the new Board were Pooley, Power, Sturt, and Rudd (Publican of the Waterloo Hotel) Power, Rudd and Pooley went on to be Shire Councillors.

=== Shire established ===
The Road District became a Shire on 30 December 1864. It was originally created with a larger area, but it lost land to the Shire of Chiltern in two transfers; on 14 May 1913 and 30 May 1917.

On 18 November 1994, the Shire of Yackandandah was abolished, and along with parts of the Shires of Beechworth, Chiltern and Rutherglen, was merged into the newly created Shire of Indigo. The Baranduda district was transferred to the Rural City of Wodonga, while the Dederang district was transferred into the newly created Alpine Shire.

== Wards ==
The Shire of Yackandandah was divided into three ridings:

- Yackandandah Riding (4 councillors)
- Kiewa Riding (3 councillors)
- Dederang Riding (2 councillors)

== Towns and localities ==
- Allans Flat
- Back Creek
- Baranduda
- Bells Flat
- Bruarong
- Dederang
- Glen Creek
- Gundowring
- Huon
- Kancoona
- Kergunyah
- Kiewa
- Mongans Bridge (& Bluff) (see below)
- Osbornes Flat
- Red Bluff
- Sandy Creek
- Staghorn Flat
- Tangambalanga
- Yackandandah*

* Council seat.

== Population ==
Year	Population
1954	3,131
1958	3,170*
1961	3,093
1966	3,062
1971	2,971
1976	3,151
1981	3,476
1986	3,989
1991	4,662

* Estimate in the 1958 Victorian Year Book.

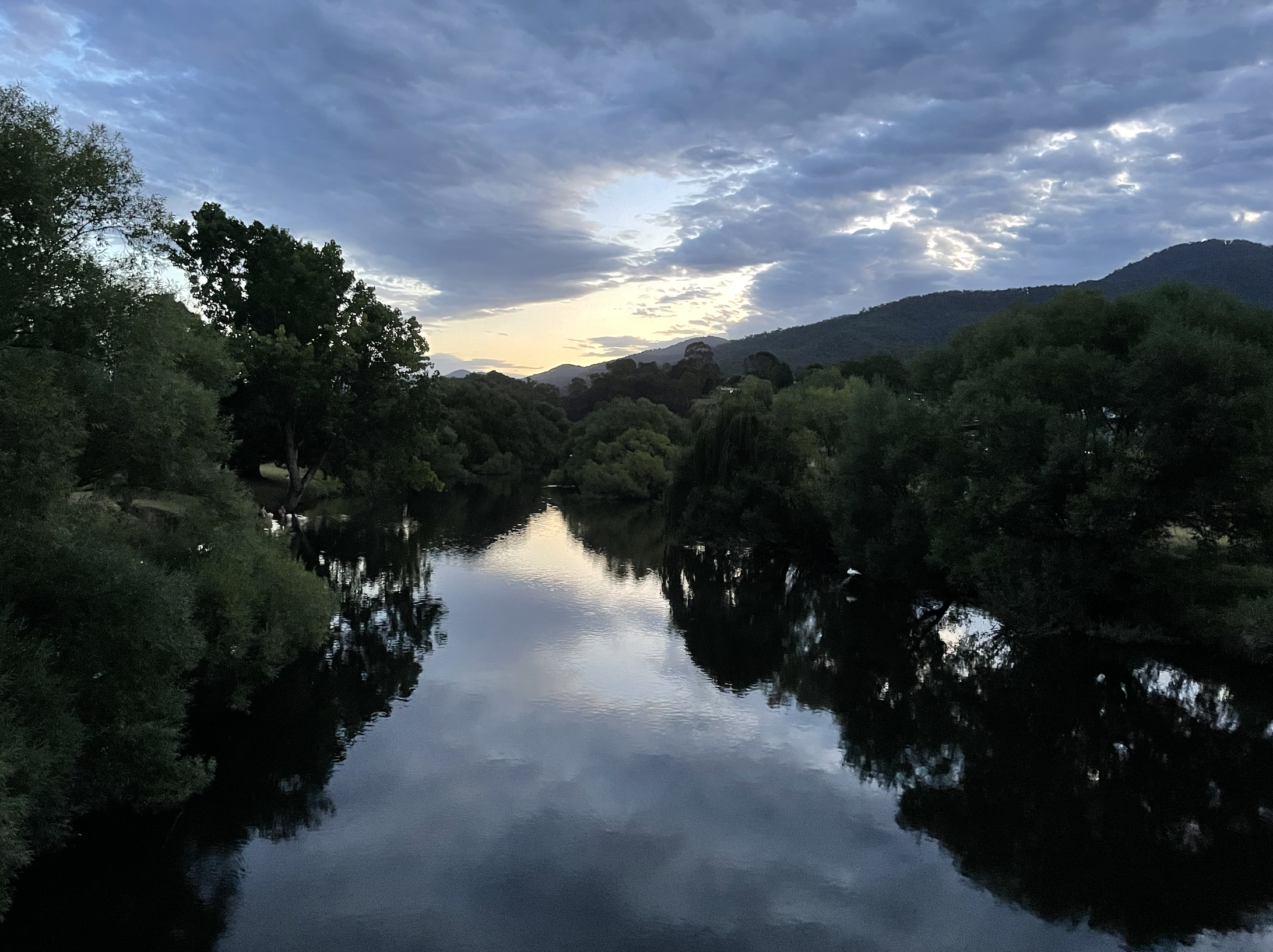
Looking north upstream of the Kiewa River, Mongans Bridge

== (John) Mongans Bridge & Mongans Bluff ==
In the 1800s, many people in the area had the surname Mongan.

In 1869, the son of Mark Mongan, a butcher in Yackandandah, was nearly drowned in a dangerous waterhole.

Daniel Mongan (born in Liverpool in 1826 and died Osbornes Flat 1911) was a member of the Yackandandah District Road Board (see above) and a Councillor of the Shire of Yackandandah. On 31 October 1876, Daniel Mongan was elected President of the Shire. In giving evidence to the Railway Commission in 1891 he was described as a farmer of Osbornes Flat.

John Mongan held land further up the valley in the Tawonga area. John was a farmer and a gold miner. He had been in California in 1849. For a time he was manager of the Spring Creek Gold Mining Company. (Gold had been discovered in and a rush began on Spring Creek (Beechworth) in 1852.) In 1883, John Mongan of Tawanga is thanked by the Yackandandah athenaeum for his gift of two lyrebird tails. In 1884, his lease of 120 hectares is approved. In that year he also won a tender for £76 for 'clearing the Tawanga Road'.

John Mongan, of Tawanga, appears again in the record advertising for staff to prospect at the head of the Kiewa Valley. In 1891 he is reported as having opened a 40 cm wide reef that was 'showing gold freely'.

The Shire received correspondence in January 1889 from John Eyre of Dederang reminding the Shire of their promise to 'erect a bridge at Mr J Mongan's at Tawanga'. In May of that year Cr Daniel Mongan moved that 'moved that tenders be called for the erection of a bridge over the Kiewa river at Tawonga.' That the Councillor did not recuse himself and actually moved the motion suggests that the two Mongans were not related. By the end of the month the Engineer had reported back to the Shire that he had prepared plans and specifications for 'Tawanga bridge at John Mongan's'.

By April 1890 the Bridge had been completed as the Engineer reported on the cost of building a road 'to the bridge at Mr John Mongans'.

As well as giving his name to the bridge across the Kiewa, the river cliff near the intersection of Bay Creek Road and Redbank-Mongan's Road, has since at least 1884, been known as Mongans Bluff.
