= John Montgomery Templeton =

Australian politician

John Montgomery Templeton CMG (20 May 1840 – 10 June 1908) was a Scottish Australian businessman, public servant and unsuccessful political candidate.

== Early life ==
He was born Kilmaurs, Ayrshire, Scotland. He was the eldest son of Hugh Templeton, a schoolmaster, and his wife Margaret, née Harvie. In December 1852, he arrived in Melbourne with his parents. He qualified as a school teacher under the National Board of Education, and became a schoolteacher, at Fitzroy, in 1857.

== Business and public service career ==
Interested in mathematics, he became an accountant for an insurance company, National Insurance Co. of Australasia, in 1868. He persuaded the directors to establish National Mutual Life Association of Australasia, in 1869, initially being its actuary and, from 1872, its secretary. In the same year, he qualified as a Fellow of the Institute of Actuaries.

In 1883, under the government of James Service, he became first chairman of the Public Service Board, and in February 1884, he resigned from National Mutual. The new board eliminated political patronage and introduced new salary scales, which caused some resentment. His attempt to achieve greater independence for the board, by direct approach to the Governor of Victoria, put the ministry against him. In 1888, he joined the board of the National Mutual, and resigned from the Public Service Board, in February 1889.

In February 1889, Benjamin Fink stood down as chairman of Mercantile Finance, and Templeton took that position. He was later appointed as the liquidator of that company and, despite a perceived conflict of interest, he pursued the task diligently, uncovering multiple instances of questionable conduct by directors and senior management. At that time, a company in voluntary liquidation, could appoint one of its directors as its liquidator.

He also was liquidator of other prominent companies that failed at the end of the Melbourne land boom, including City of Melbourne Bank and Premier Permanent Building, Land, and Investment Association.

Templeton became chairman of National Mutual in 1895, and managing director in 1897-1908. He remained as managing director, until his death.

== Military involvement ==
Templeton in military uniform.

Templeton joined the volunteers as a private in the Collingwood Rifles. He rose through the ranks, becoming a lieutenant in 1864, then captain and battalion adjutant in 1867. In 1873, he became a major of the Second Metropolitan Victorian Battalion in 1873, being promoted n 1883 to lieutenant-colonel. He became a full colonel, in 1885.

Templeton was often referred to using his military title of Colonel. He was awarded the Volunteer Officers' Decoration.

== Political life ==
Templeton attempted to enter parliament two times. He was elected to the Victorian Legislative Assembly seat of Benalla and Yarrawonga at an 1893 by-election, and received the same number of votes as the other candidate, Thomas Kennedy. Templeton was declared the winner on the returning officer's casting vote, and Kennedy then petitioned the clerk of the Legislative Assembly against the return, citing electoral irregularities and Templeton's position in the colonial militia and as an official liquidator possibly representing an office of profit under the crown. The assembly's Committee of Elections and Qualifications found that Templeton did not hold an office of profit, but declared the election void due to the failure to provide an electoral roll to the Devenish polling booth. Montgomery and Kennedy contested the resulting by-election, which Kennedy won.

In 1903, Templeton was one of the unsuccessful candidates for the Senate at the federal election.

== Family and death ==
His first wife was Mary Lush, whom he married on 20 April 1866. His second wife was a 38-year old secretary, Carrie Taylor, 38-year-old secretary, whom he married on 19 August 1905. He had no children.

On 10 June 1908, he died of pleurisy and heart failure at his home, Kilmaurs, at 179 George Street, East Melbourne, and was interred in Melbourne General Cemetery.
