= John McEwen =

Prime Minister of Australia from 1967 to 1968

The Right Honourable Sir John McEwen GCMG CH
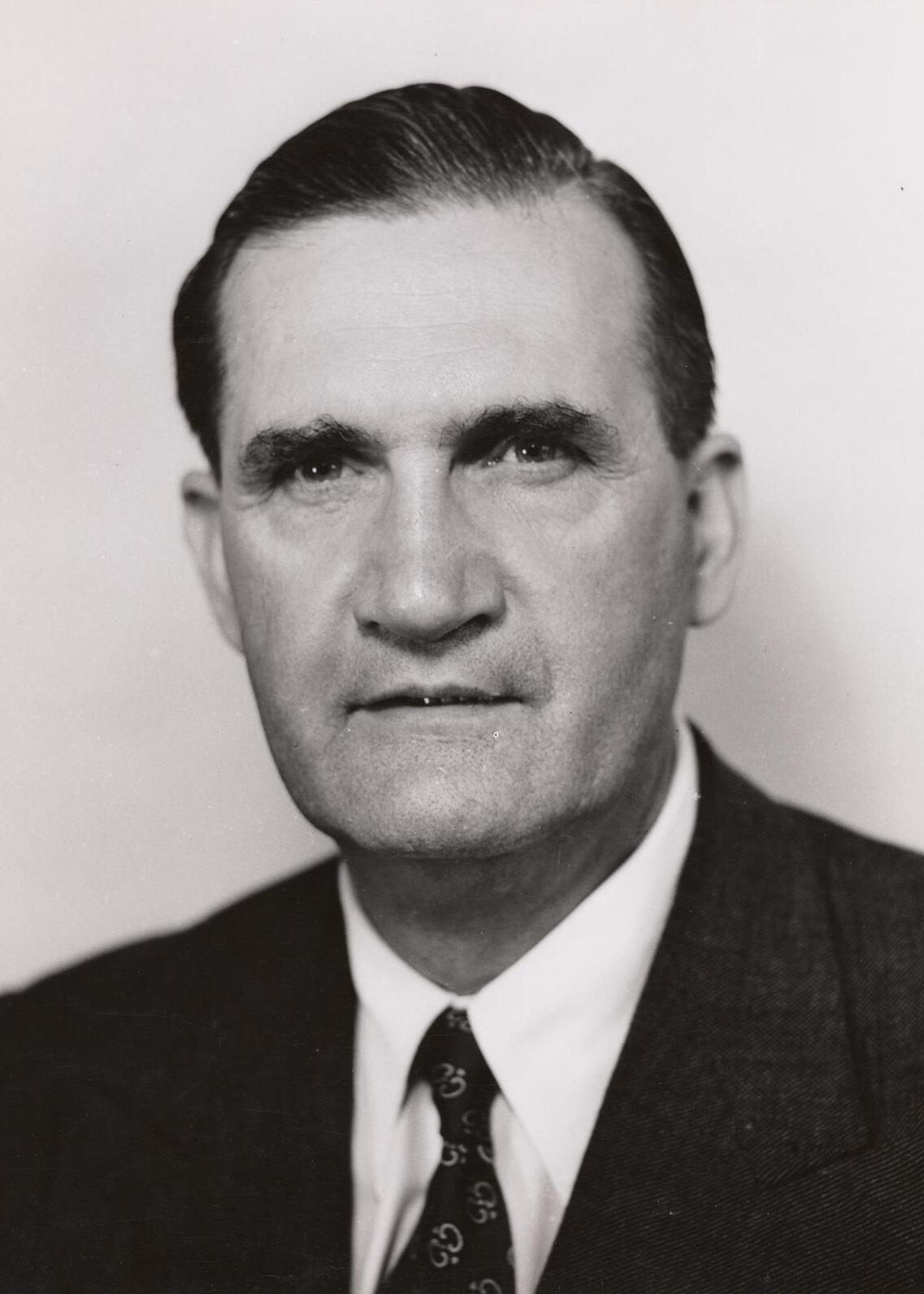
- Official portrait, 1957

18th Prime Minister of Australia
- In office 19 December 1967 – 10 January 1968
- Monarch: Elizabeth II
- Governor-General: Lord Casey
- Preceded by: Harold Holt
- Succeeded by: John Gorton

Deputy Prime Minister of Australia
- In office 10 January 1968 – 5 February 1971
- Prime Minister: John Gorton
- Preceded by: Office established; Himself (de facto, 1967)
- Succeeded by: Doug Anthony
- De facto 26 March 1958 – 17 December 1967
- Prime Minister: Robert Menzies; Harold Holt
- Preceded by: Arthur Fadden
- Succeeded by: Himself (1968)

5th Leader of the Country Party
- In office 26 March 1958 – 5 February 1971
- Deputy: Charles Davidson; Charles Adermann; Doug Anthony
- Preceded by: Arthur Fadden
- Succeeded by: Doug Anthony

Deputy Leader of the Country Party
- In office 22 September 1943 – 26 March 1958
- Leader: Arthur Fadden
- Preceded by: Arthur Fadden
- Succeeded by: Charles Davidson
Cabinet posts
Minister for Trade and Industry
In office 18 December 1963 – 5 February 1971
Prime Minister	Robert Menzies; Harold Holt; Himself; John Gorton
Preceded by	Himself (Trade)
Succeeded by	Doug Anthony
Minister for Trade
In office 11 January 1956 – 18 December 1963
Prime Minister	Robert Menzies
Preceded by	Neil O'Sullivan (Trade and Customs)
Succeeded by	Himself (Trade and Industry)
Minister for Commerce and Agriculture
In office 19 December 1949 – 11 January 1956
Prime Minister	Robert Menzies
Preceded by	Reg Pollard
Succeeded by	William McMahon
Minister for Air
In office 28 October 1940 – 7 October 1941
Prime Minister	Robert Menzies; Arthur Fadden
Preceded by	Arthur Fadden
Succeeded by	Arthur Drakeford
Minister for Civil Aviation
In office 28 October 1940 – 7 October 1941
Prime Minister	Robert Menzies; Arthur Fadden
Preceded by	Arthur Fadden
Succeeded by	Arthur Drakeford
Minister for External Affairs
In office 14 March 1940 – 28 October 1940
Prime Minister	Robert Menzies
Preceded by	Henry Gullett
Succeeded by	Frederick Stewart
Minister for the Interior
In office 29 November 1937 – 26 April 1939
Prime Minister	Joseph Lyons; Earle Page
Preceded by	Thomas Paterson
Succeeded by	Harry Foll
Parliamentary roles
Father of the House
In office 30 September 1969 – 1 February 1971
Preceded by	Joe Clark
Succeeded by	Arthur Calwell
Member of the House of Representatives
In office 10 December 1949 – 1 February 1971
Preceded by	constituency established
Succeeded by	Bruce Lloyd
Constituency	Murray
In office 23 October 1937 – 10 December 1949
Preceded by	William Hutchinson
Succeeded by	William Bostock
Constituency	Indi
In office 15 September 1934 – 23 October 1937
Preceded by	William Hill
Succeeded by	constituency abolished
Constituency	Echuca

Personal details
- Born: 29 March 1900 Chiltern, Colony of Victoria
- Died: 20 November 1980 (aged 80) Toorak, Victoria, Australia
- Party: Country
- Spouses: Anne McLeod (m. 1921; died 1967) Mary Byrne (m. 1968)
- Education: Wangaratta State School; Dandenong State School
- Occupation: Farmer; politician

Sir John McEwen (29 March 1900 – 20 November 1980) was the 18th prime minister of Australia, serving from 1967 to 1968 in a caretaker capacity following the disappearance of prime minister Harold Holt. He was the leader of the Country Party from 1958 to 1971, serving as the inaugural deputy prime minister of Australia from 1968 to 1971.

McEwen was born in Chiltern, Victoria. He was orphaned at the age of seven and raised by his grandmother, initially in Wangaratta and then in Dandenong. McEwen left school when he was 13 and joined the Australian Army at the age of 18, but the war ended before his unit was shipped out. He was nonetheless eligible for a soldier settlement scheme, and selected a property at Stanhope. He established a dairy farm, but later bought a larger property and farmed beef cattle.

After several previous unsuccessful candidacies, McEwen was elected to the House of Representatives at the 1934 federal election. He was first elevated to cabinet by Joseph Lyons in 1937. McEwen became deputy leader of the Country Party in 1943, under Arthur Fadden. He replaced Fadden as leader in 1958, and remained in the position until his retirement from politics in 1971. He served in parliament for 36 years in total, spending a record 25 years as a government minister.

The Liberal-Country Coalition returned to power in 1949, initially under Robert Menzies and then under Harold Holt. McEwen came to have a major influence on economic policy, particularly in the areas of agriculture, manufacturing, and trade. As soon as McEwen became the leader of the Country Party, he became the de facto deputy prime minister.

In December 1967, Harold Holt disappeared in an apparent accident while swimming in the sea, and was presumed dead while in office. As the de facto deputy prime minister, McEwen was commissioned as caretaker prime minister while the Liberal Party elected a new leader. He was 67 at the time, the oldest person to become prime minister and only the third from the Country Party, as well as the last to be born before Australia's federation. McEwen ceded power to John Gorton after 23 days in office in January 1968, and in recognition of his service was appointed deputy prime minister, the first time that position had been formally created. He was Australia's third–shortest serving prime minister, after Earle Page and Frank Forde. He remained as deputy prime minister until his retirement from politics in 1971.

== Early life ==
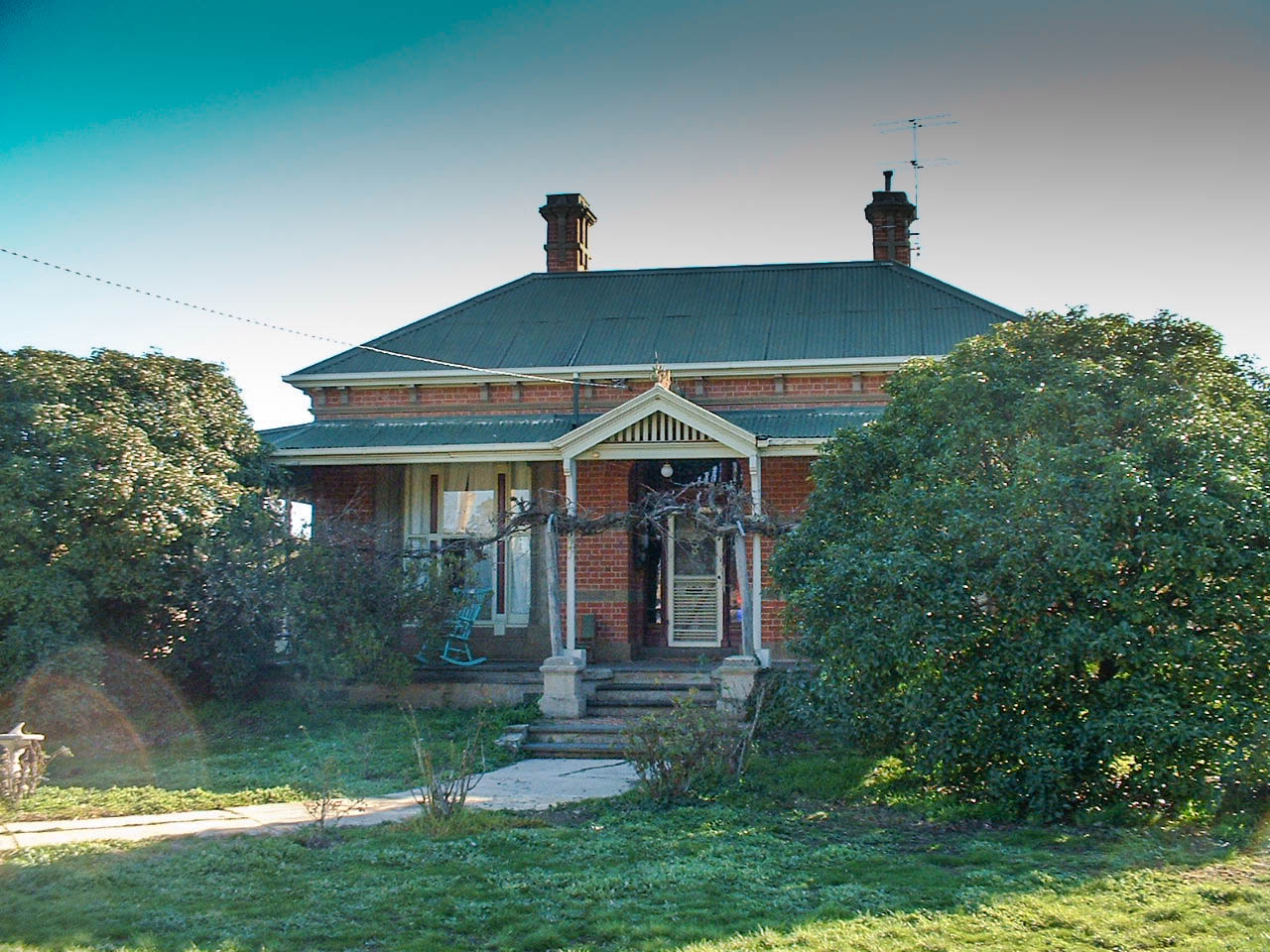
McEwen's birthplace, located at 73 Main Street, Chiltern, Victoria

=== Birth and family background ===
McEwen was born on 29 March 1900, at his parents' home in Chiltern, Victoria. He was the son of Amy Ellen (née Porter) and David James McEwen. His mother was born in Victoria, and had English and Irish ancestry. His father was of Ulster Scots origin, born in Mountnorris, County Armagh (in present-day Northern Ireland). He worked as a chemist, and also served a term on the Chiltern Shire Council. The family surname was originally spelled "MacEwen", but was altered upon David McEwen's arrival in Australia in 1889.

=== Childhood ===
In his memoirs, McEwen recounted that he had almost no memories of his parents. His mother died of lung disease in March 1902, just before his second birthday; she had given birth to a daughter, Amy, a few months earlier. She was the second of his father's three wives, and McEwen had three half-siblings – Gladys, Evelyn, and George. After their mother's death, McEwen and his sister were raised by their father, living in the rooms behind his chemist's shop. He died from meningitis in September 1907, when his son was seven. John and Amy were sent to live with their widowed grandmother, Nellie Porter (née Cook), while their younger half-brother went to live with his mother in Melbourne. They had never lived with their older half-sisters, who had been sent to live in a children's home upon their mother's death in 1893.

McEwen's grandmother ran a boardinghouse in Wangaratta. He grew up in what he described as "pretty frugal circumstances", and in 1912 his grandmother moved the family to Dandenong, on the outskirts of Melbourne. McEwen attended state schools in Wangaratta and Dandenong until the age of thirteen, when he began working for Rocke, Tompsitt & Co., a drug manufacturer in central Melbourne. He initially worked as a switchboard operator, for which he was paid 15 shillings per week. McEwen began attending night school in Prahran, and in 1915 passed an examination for the Commonwealth Public Service and began working as a junior clerk at the office of the Commonwealth Crown Solicitor. His immediate superior there was Fred Whitlam, the father of another future prime minister, Gough Whitlam.

=== Soldier-settler ===
With World War I ongoing, McEwen resolved to enter the military when he turned 18. He joined the Australian Army Cadets and completed a Royal Australian Navy course in radiotelegraphy, hoping to qualify for the newly opened Royal Military College, Duntroon. He passed the entrance exam, but instead chose to enlist as a private in the Australian Imperial Force, in order to be posted overseas sooner. The war ended before his unit shipped out. Despite the briefness of his service, McEwen was eligible for the Victorian government's soldier settlement scheme. He selected an 86-acre (35 ha) lot at Stanhope, on land that previously been a sheep station. As with many other soldier-settlers, McEwen initially did not have the money or the expertise needed to run a farm. He spent several months working as a farm labourer and later did the same as a stevedore at the Port of Melbourne, eventually saving enough money to return to Stanhope and establish his dairy farm.

McEwen's new property was virtually undeveloped, with only a single existing building (a small shack) and no fences, irrigation, or paddocks. He and the other soldier-settlers in the Stanhope district suffered a number of hardships in the early 1920s, including droughts, rabbit plagues, and low milk prices. Many of them were forced off their properties, allowing those who survived to expand their holdings relatively cheaply. In 1926, McEwen sold his property and bought a larger farm nearby, which he named Chilgala (a portmanteau of Chiltern and Tongala, the birthplaces of himself and his wife). He switched from dairy to beef cattle, and was able to expand his property by buying abandoned farms from the government. At its peak, Chilgala covered 3,000 acres (1,200 ha) and carried 1,800 head of cattle. McEwen had a reputation as one of the best farmers in the district, and came to be seen by the other soldier-settlers as a spokesman and leader. He represented them in meetings with government officials, and was secretary of the local Water Users' League, which protected the interests of irrigators. In 1923, he co-founded the Stanhope Dairy Co-operative, and was elected as the company's inaugural chairman.

== Early years in politics ==
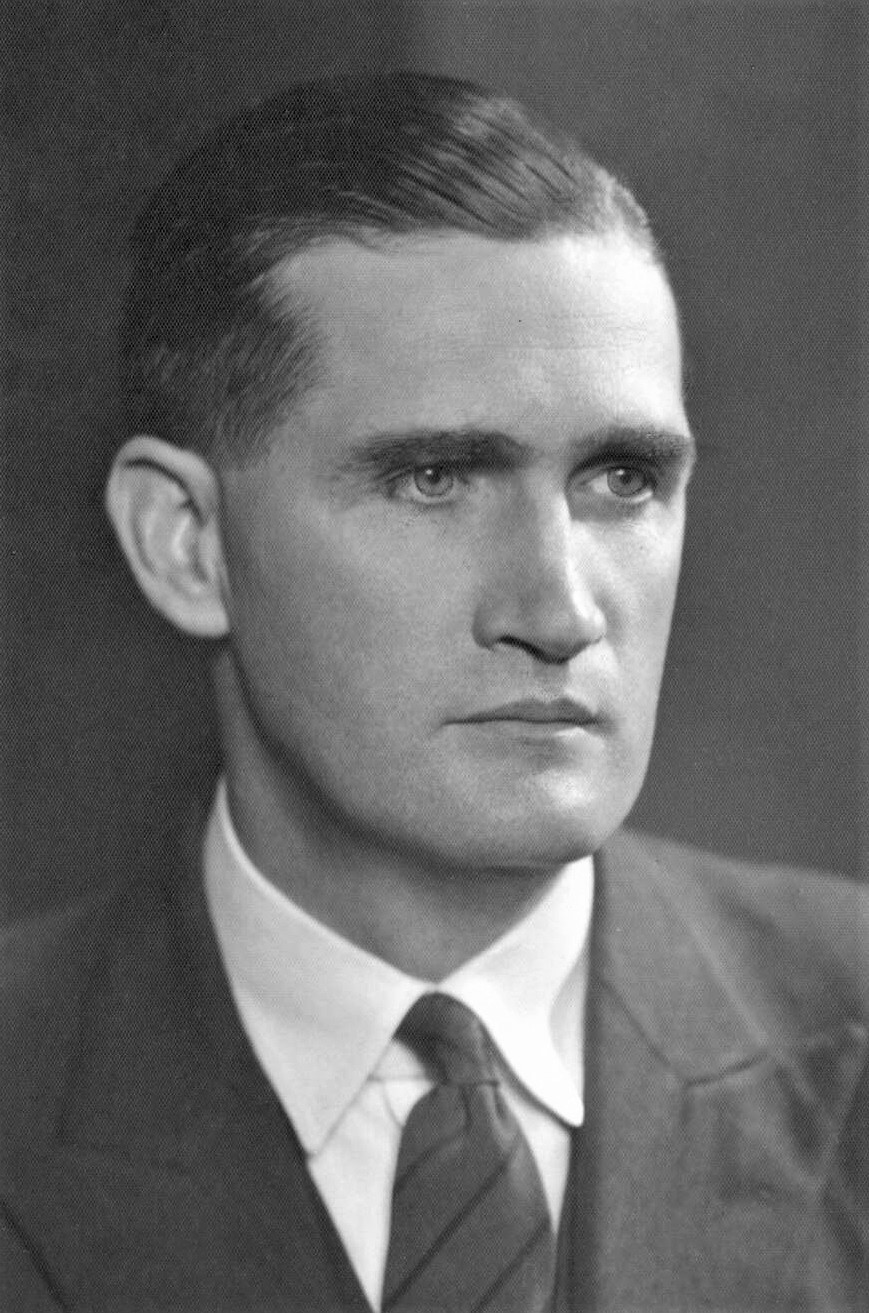
McEwen in the 1930s

McEwen joined the Victorian Farmers' Union in 1919 at the age of 19 and was soon active in the Country Party, its political wing. He first stood for parliament at the 1932 Victorian state election, contesting the Legislative Assembly seat of Waranga. While unsuccessful, he more than doubled the Country Party's vote from the previous election. His campaigning efforts brought him to the attention of party leaders and he soon joined the state executive.

In 1934, the Victorian Country Party's central council mandated that its federal MPs and senators sign a pledge requiring strict party discipline and giving the central council a veto over the terms of any coalition government. The party's three MPs and two senators in Victoria refused to sign the pledge, receiving support from their parliamentary colleagues and the party's federal executive. Country MP William Hill decided to quit politics altogether in protest, with McEwen endorsed by the Victorian party as its replacement for Hill in the seat of Echuca. At the 1934 election he faced two "Independent Country" opponents supported by the federal party, with the party's federal leader Earle Page actively campaigning in their favour. McEwen nonetheless retained Echuca with the aid of favourable preference flows from Australian Labor Party (ALP) voters.

Despite McEwen's acceptance of the Victorian Country Party's pledge, after his election to parliament he "immediately associated himself with the federal party and incurred the hostility of his Victorian colleagues for urging that the breach be healed". In his first term he successfully lobbied the Lyons government to introduce a variable excise duty on flour, linking the duty paid by farmers to the international spot rate. He regarded this as "the first step towards a wheat industry stabilisation plan". In April 1935 he announced his support for a royal commission into the Australian banking system, which the government convened later in the year. In 1936, following the Privy Council's ruling in James v Commonwealth, McEwen moved in parliament that the constitution be amended to allow for the federal government to legislate on the marketing of agricultural products. The government ultimately put forward a referendum proposal in 1937 which was defeated by voters.

=== Interior minister, 1937–1939 ===
McEwen's seat was abolished in a redistribution during his first term and he transferred to the seat of Indi at the 1937 election. He rose rapidly within the parliamentary Country Party and narrowly failed to win the deputy leadership after the 1937 election, losing to Harold Thorby by a single vote on the second ballot. He was subsequently appointed Minister for the Interior in the third Lyons ministry, a coalition government between the Country Party and the United Australia Party (UAP) led by Prime Minister Joseph Lyons. His new portfolio was "spacious in its command of broad policy issues and diversity of administrative functions" and included "Commonwealth public works, railways, immigration, the Northern and Australian Capital territories, Aborigines, electoral administration, mining, and oil exploration".

As interior minister, McEwen instituted the New Deal for Aborigines, a landmark policy statement on Indigenous Australians which described its aim as "the raising of their status so as to entitle them by right and by qualification to the ordinary rights of citizenship and enable them and help them to share with us the opportunities that are available in their own native land". The policy specified cultural assimilation as the basis on which civil rights would be extended to the Indigenous population. The policy was drafted by McEwen in conjunction with his adviser A. P. Elkin.

Following Lyons' death in April 1939, Country Party leader Earle Page withdrew his party from the coalition with the UAP and McEwen's first stint as a minister came to an end. Page's decision – largely due to his personal disdain for the new UAP prime minister Robert Menzies – proved controversial within his own party and four Country MPs left the parliamentary party.

=== Country Party conflict ===
McEwen's decision to accept a ministerial post after the 1937 election placed him into conflict with the central council of the Victorian Country Party, which had previously called on its federal MPs to withdraw from the federal coalition with the UAP. At the time, the central council was under the control of a left-wing faction and the party's state leader Albert Dunstan was governing in Victoria with the support of the Labor Party. In December 1937, McEwen was formally expelled from the Victorian Country Party, while remaining a member of the federal parliamentary Country Party. In response, he issued a statement denying the legitimacy of his expulsion and stating it was instead because he had been "too powerful in opposing the ambitions of the radical element in control of the Victorian central council". McEwen's supporters subsequently formed an alternative organisation, the Liberal Country Party (LCP), to support his election campaigns. His parliamentary colleague Thomas Paterson resigned from the Victorian Country Party in solidarity, with he and McEwen re-elected with the support of the LCP at the 1940 election. The LCP eventually merged back into the Victorian Country Party in 1943.

== World War II and aftermath ==
=== Leadership candidate ===
Page resigned as Country Party leader following the outbreak of World War II, in order to facilitate the resumption of a coalition government with the UAP. McEwen contested the resulting leadership ballot on 13 September 1939, losing by seven votes to five to South Australian MP Archie Cameron. Prior to the ballot, the party room had voted against allowing the four dissident MPs to rejoin the parliamentary party, although this decision was reversed a few months later. According to McEwen, the four MPs were his supporters and their presence would have meant he won the leadership ballot over Cameron.

Cameron's leadership of the Country Party proved troubled due to his leadership style. Only a few weeks after his election, McEwen joined three other Country Party MPs in crossed the floor to support an ALP amendment to a bill on conscientious objectors. The 1940 federal election resulted in a hung parliament, with the Country Party losing three seats. A further leadership ballot was held on 16 October 1940, McEwen and Page again nominating for the leadership. Cameron regarded this as a betrayal and "stormed out of the meeting in a fury", defecting to the UAP a few weeks later. Two ballots were held, with McEwen and Page tied on eight votes each. Arthur Fadden was then elected acting leader as a compromise candidate. He was subsequently confirmed in the position in March 1941, a role he would hold until 1958.

=== External affairs minister, 1940 ===
The coalition with the UAP resumed under Cameron's leadership of the Country Party and McEwen was appointed Minister for External Affairs in the second Menzies ministry on 14 March 1940. With Menzies concentrating on the war in Europe, his department was primarily concerned with diplomatic efforts in the Pacific. His tenure included the appointment of High Court chief justice John Latham as Australia's first minister in Japan and the appointment of Bertram Ballard as Australia's first official representative in New Caledonia.

In later life, McEwen repeatedly cited his "greatest achievement" as securing Australian intervention in the 1940 New Caledonia coup d'état, which saw the pro-Axis Vichy colonial governor overthrown and replaced by a pro-Allied Free French governor. McEwen regarded this as a major strategic victory for the Allies in the Pacific as it allowed for construction of Naval Base Noumea and secured control over the nickel mining industry. He personally claimed a key role in persuading the cabinet and government officials to actively intervene by dispatching an Australian warship to install the Free French governor. However, historians of the event have found it difficult to reconcile McEwen's claims with the documentary record of the events.

=== Air minister, 1940–1941 ===
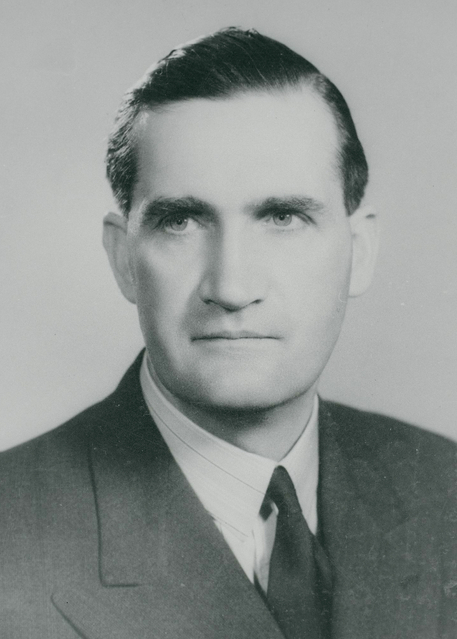
McEwen in 1940

On 16 October 1940, McEwen was appointed Minister for Air and Minister for Civil Aviation in a post-election cabinet reshuffle. Fadden had been acting in the portfolios for several months following the death of James Fairbairn, who had been one of three government ministers killed in the Canberra air disaster in August 1940. McEwen remained as air and civil aviation minister until the defeat of the Fadden government in October 1941, with Fadden having succeeded as prime minister upon Menzies' resignation in August 1941.

As air minister, McEwen oversaw the continued expansion of the Royal Australian Air Force (RAAF). He secured war cabinet approval for volunteers to be recruited from the Citizen Military Forces and also authorised steps to expand RAAF auxiliaries, announcing the creation of the Australian Air Force Cadets and the Women's Auxiliary Australian Air Force in early 1941. According to an official RAAF history, he "made it clear that he did not favour the enlistment of women in the air force unless it was unavoidable, but unavoidable it became". He had a strained relationship with RAAF chief Charles Burnett, frequently clashing over expenditure matters.

McEwen oversaw the acceleration of Australia's involvement in the Empire Air Training Scheme, which saw RAAF personnel receive training in Canada before being seconded to the Royal Air Force (RAF) for combat in the European theatre. In May 1941, McEwen announced that 1,000 RAAF ground staff would be seconded to the RAF. He faced criticisms that RAAF personnel in the UK were being assigned to RAF units rather than the Article XV squadrons required by the scheme, and that Australian officers were being denied senior leadership opportunities in RAF commands. In August 1941 he despatched Richard Williams to London to establish RAAF Overseas Headquarters, with the aim of securing greater Australian input in decision-making.

=== Opposition, 1941–1949 ===
McEwen continued to serve on the Advisory War Council following the Fadden government's defeat, remaining as a member for the duration of the war. On the council he advocated for "independent and first-hand reports of the New Guinea situation, and was critical of the northern air defence strategy". McEwen was elected deputy leader of the Country Party in September 1943, with the position having been vacant since Fadden's elevation to the leadership. He opposed suggestions that the Country Party should merge into the new Liberal Party of Australia, created by Menzies as a replacement for the UAP, and remained defensive of the Country Party's independence throughout his political career.

Remaining in opposition after the ALP won majority government at the 1943 and 1946 elections, McEwen was "closely involved with Fadden in rebuilding the Country Party, developing its policies, and preparing it for office in partnership with Menzies' rejuvenated Liberal Party". He was a prominent campaigner for the "No" vote in the Curtin government's 1944 post-war reconstruction referendum. He was also a leading opponent of the Chifley government's attempts to nationalise the private banking sector in 1947 and 1948.

== Menzies and Holt governments ==
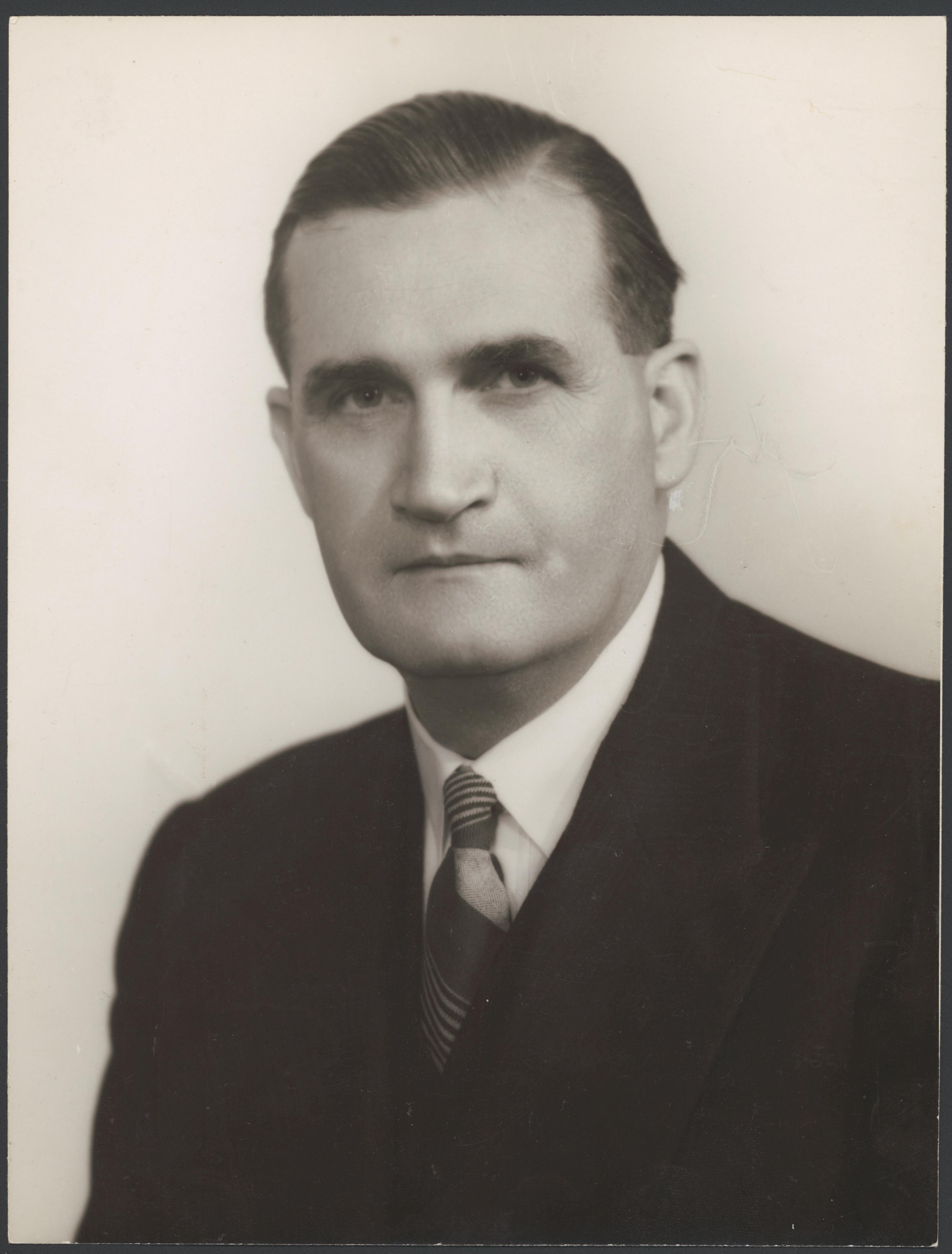
McEwen in 1950

The conservatives returned to office in 1949 under Robert Menzies after eight years in opposition. At this election, McEwen stood in the new seat of Murray, which had been carved out of Indi's northwest section. He became Minister for Commerce and Agriculture, switching to Minister for Trade in 1956. Menzies nicknamed him "Black Jack", due to his dark eyebrows, grim nature, and occasional temper. In the Menzies government, McEwen pursued what became known as "McEwenism" – a policy of high tariff protection for the manufacturing industry, so that industry would not challenge the continuing high tariffs on imported raw materials, which benefitted farmers but pushed up industry's costs. This policy was a part (some argue the foundation) of what became known as the "Australian settlement" which promoted high wages, industrial development, government intervention in industry (Australian governments traditionally owned banks and insurance companies and the railways and through policies designed to assist particular industries) and decentralisation.

=== Trade negotiations ===
Beginning in the early 1950s, McEwen and his departmental secretary John Crawford played a key role in the normalisation and acceleration of the Australia–Japan trade relationship. Prior to World War II, Japan had been one of the largest destinations for Australian exports. The resumption of trade after the war was politically sensitive, due both to lingering anti-Japanese sentiment – including from several of McEwen's parliamentary colleagues who had been prisoners-of-war – and concerns from Australian manufacturers over the cheaper cost of labour in Japan. McEwen came to see the resumption of trade with Japan as important for Australian producers, as Australia sought new markets outside the existing framework of Imperial Preference.

McEwen first put forward a cabinet proposal to enter into trade negotiations with Japan in July 1953, which was rejected although an accompanying recommendation to liberalise restrictions on Japanese imports was accepted. He eventually secured cabinet approval for trade talks with Japan in November 1954, on his third attempt. In February 1955, he also persuaded cabinet to agree to Japan's accession to the General Agreement on Tariffs and Trade (GATT), although Australia and many other former Allied powers invoked an exception under Article 35 of the GATT treaty allowing them to continue to discriminate against Japan. After years of negotiations, McEwen and his Japanese counterpart Kishi Nobusuke signed the Japan–Australia Commerce Agreement in July 1957, with each country conferring most favoured nation status on the other and Australia providing a commitment to revoke its Article 35 exception. This eventually occurred in 1960 after McEwen secured Japanese concessions on imports of Australian beef. The final discriminatory trade provisions were removed in a new agreement signed in 1963.

The trade agreement with Japan "ushered in a new era of Australian trade which would make Japan immeasurably Australia's biggest trading partner". Its signing was regarded as a personal triumph for McEwen, who was its main advocate in the government and bore much of the political risk. According to Malcolm Fraser, Menzies only authorised McEwen to negotiate in his own name, not on behalf of the government, and "if it had gone wrong Menzies could have disowned him up to the moment the government accepted the agreement". In 1973, the Japanese government awarded McEwen the Grand Cordon of the Order of the Rising Sun, making him only the second Australian politician after Edmund Barton to receive the honour.

=== Relationship with the Liberal Party ===
In 1958, following Fadden's retirement, McEwen was elected unopposed as leader of the Country Party. Under the Coalition agreement, he thus became the de facto deputy prime minister, and was afforded a free choice of portfolio. Fadden had been Treasurer, but McEwen somewhat unexpectedly chose to continue on as trade minister. This allowed Harold Holt to become the first Liberal MP to serve as Treasurer; since then every Treasurer in a Coalition government has been a Liberal. McEwen nonetheless had considerable influence in cabinet. He and his party favoured interventionist economic policies and were opposed to foreign ownership of industrial assets, which placed him frequently at odds with his Liberal colleagues. In 1962, a dispute between McEwen and Assistant Treasurer Les Bury ended with Bury being sacked from cabinet. His stature eventually grew to the point where he was considered a potential successor to Menzies as prime minister. An opinion poll in December 1963 showed that 19 percent of Coalition voters favoured McEwen as Menzies' successor, only two points behind the poll leader Holt. By December 1965, this number had risen to 27 percent, compared with Holt's 22 percent. McEwen's cause was championed by a number of media outlets, including The Sun and The Australian. Nonetheless, he had few supporters within the Liberal Party, and it was generally held that he would have to become a Liberal if he were to lead the Coalition, which he was unwilling to do.

Holt replaced Menzies as prime minister in January 1966, with McEwen continuing on his previous position. His portfolio had been expanded after the 1963 election, with his department now called the Department of Trade and Industry. McEwen enjoyed a "sound working relationship" with Holt, but without the same rapport he had had with Menzies. However, he had a poor relationship with William McMahon, Holt's replacement as Treasurer. They had philosophical differences over free trade and foreign investment, both of which McEwen opposed. McMahon was also suspected to be undermining McEwen through his connections in the media.

McEwen's most serious disagreement with Holt came in November 1967, when it was announced that Australia – which had converted to decimal currency the previous year – would not follow the recent devaluation of the pound sterling. This effectively marked Australia's withdrawal from the sterling area. McEwen issued a public statement criticising the decision, which he feared would damage primary industry. Holt considered this a breach of cabinet solidarity, and made preparations for the Liberal Party to govern in its own right in case the Country Party withdrew from the government. The situation was eventually resolved In Holt's favour.

== Prime minister, 1967–1968 ==
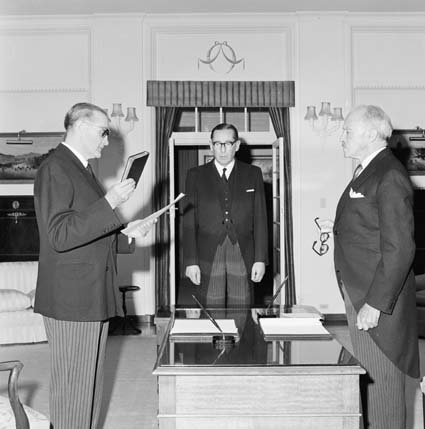
McEwen being sworn in as Prime Minister on 19 December 1967

On 17 December 1967, Holt disappeared while swimming at Portsea, Victoria, and was presumed to have drowned. McEwen was at his farm when alerted of Holt's disappearance and proceeded to Canberra, where he conferred with Governor-General Richard Casey and other cabinet ministers. Casey commissioned McEwen as prime minister on 19 December, on the basis that he would only hold office until the Liberal Party elected a new leader to succeed Holt. All other members of Holt's ministry remained in their existing portfolios.

In line with his undertaking to Casey, McEwen led a caretaker government and conducted little official business, although he did hold talks with New Zealand prime minister Keith Holyoake on butter exports, a matter within his own portfolio. His first public address and press conference were given on 20 December and focused on Holt's legacy and the circumstances of his appointment. On 22 December he attended Holt's state memorial service in Melbourne, which was attended by many world leaders. McEwen delivered a New Year's Day radio and television broadcast where he praised the Holt government's achievements and expressed hopes for an end to the Vietnam War. He resigned as prime minister on 10 January 1968 following the election of Senator John Gorton as Liberal leader. He expected to continue in office until Gorton transferred to the House of Representatives, in line with constitutional convention, but deferred to Gorton's wishes to assume office immediately.

Approaching 68, McEwen was the oldest person ever to be appointed Prime Minister of Australia, although not the oldest to serve; Menzies left office one month and six days after his 71st birthday. McEwen had been encouraged to remain prime minister on a more permanent basis but to do so would have required him to defect to the Liberals, an option he had never contemplated.

=== Liberal leadership veto ===
A day after Holt's disappearance, before his appointment as prime minister, McEwen announced that he and the Country Party would withdraw from the Coalition if William McMahon was elected as Holt's successor. Despite the Country Party's smaller parliamentary numbers, this amounted to a veto on McMahon's leadership ambitions.

It had long been presumed that McMahon, who was both Treasurer and deputy Liberal leader, would succeed Holt as Liberal leader and hence prime minister. However, McEwen sparked a leadership crisis when he announced that he and his Country Party colleagues would not serve under McMahon. McEwen is reported to have despised McMahon personally. More importantly, McEwen was bitterly opposed to McMahon on political grounds, because McMahon was allied with free trade advocates in the conservative parties and favoured sweeping tariff reforms, a position that was vehemently opposed by McEwen, his Country Party colleagues and their rural constituents.

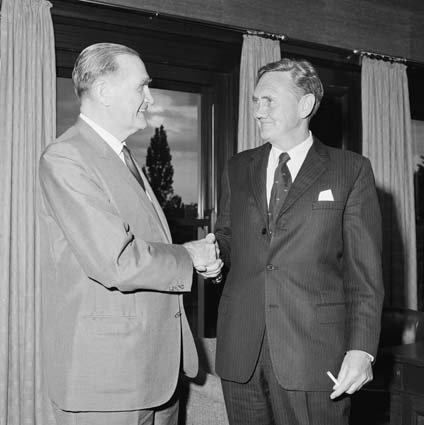
McEwen with John Gorton following the latter's election as Liberal leader on 9 January 1968

Another key factor in McEwen's antipathy towards McMahon was hinted at soon after the crisis by the veteran political journalist Alan Reid. According to Reid, McEwen was aware that McMahon was habitually breaching Cabinet confidentiality and regularly leaking information to favoured journalists and lobbyists, including Maxwell Newton, who had been hired as a "consultant" by Japanese trade interests.

Even in the wake of their landslide victory in 1966, the Liberals were still four seats short of an outright majority. With only the Country Party as a realistic coalition partner, McEwen's opposition forced McMahon to withdraw from the leadership ballot. This opened the door for the successful campaign to promote the Minister for Education and Science, Senator John Gorton, to the Prime Ministership with the support of a group led by Defence Minister Malcolm Fraser. Gorton was elected as leader of the Liberal Party on 9 January 1968, and succeeded McEwen as prime minister the following day. It was the second time the Country Party had effectively vetoed its senior partner's choice for the leadership; in 1923 Earle Page had demanded that the Nationalist Party, one of the forerunners of the Liberals, remove Billy Hughes as leader before he would even consider coalition talks.

== Gorton government and final years ==
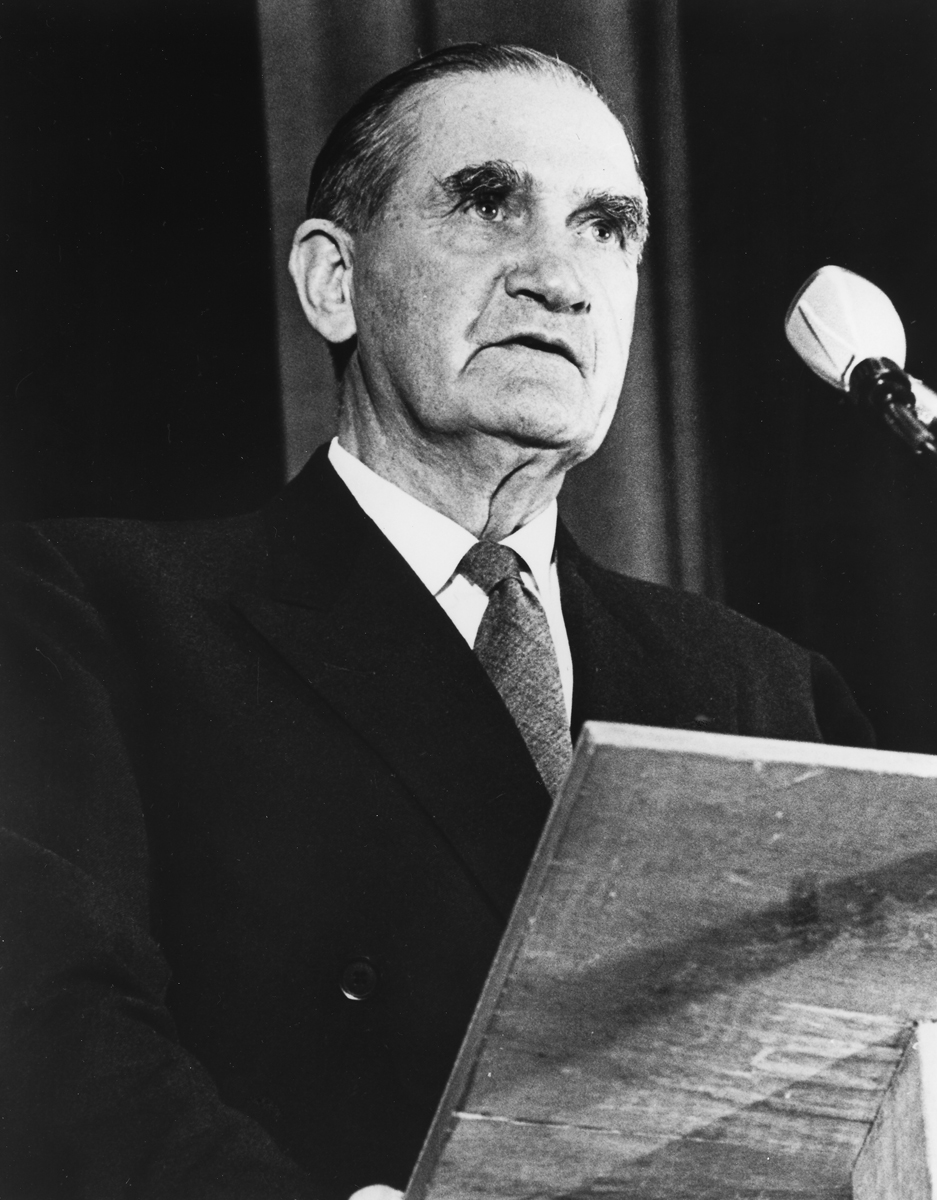
McEwen in the 1960s

Gorton created the formal title deputy prime minister for McEwen, confirming his status as the second-ranking member of the government. Prior to then, the title had been used informally for whoever was recognised as the second-ranking member of the government – the leader of the Country Party when the Coalition was in government, and Labor's deputy leader when Labor was in government. Even before being formally named Deputy Prime Minister, McEwen had exercised an effective veto over government policy since 1966 by virtue of being the most senior member of the government, having been a member of the Coalition frontbench without interruption since 1937.

McEwen retired from politics in 1971. In his memoir, he recalls his career as being "long and very, very hard", and turned back to managing 1,800 head of cattle on his property in Goulburn Valley. In the same year, Clifton Pugh won the Archibald Prize for a portrait of McEwen. While he had softened in his "unequivocal support for protection" by the time of his retirement he had given way to free-traders with regards to agriculture. However, he felt differently about manufacturing, as it was essential to National power:

"My own view has always been that it would be ridiculous to think that Australia was safe in the long term unless we built up our population and built up our industries. So I have always wanted to make Australia a powerful industrialised country as well as a major agricultural and mining country. This basic attitude meant that I was bound to favour broadly protectionist policies aimed at developing our manufacturing sector."

At the time of his resignation, he had served in parliament for 36 years and 5 months, serving the last 34 years as either a minister (1937–1941 and 1949–1971) or opposition frontbencher (1941–1949). He was the last serving parliamentarian from the Great Depression era, and hence the last parliamentary survivor of the Lyons government. By the time of his death, Malcolm Fraser's government was abandoning McEwenite trade policies.

== Honours ==
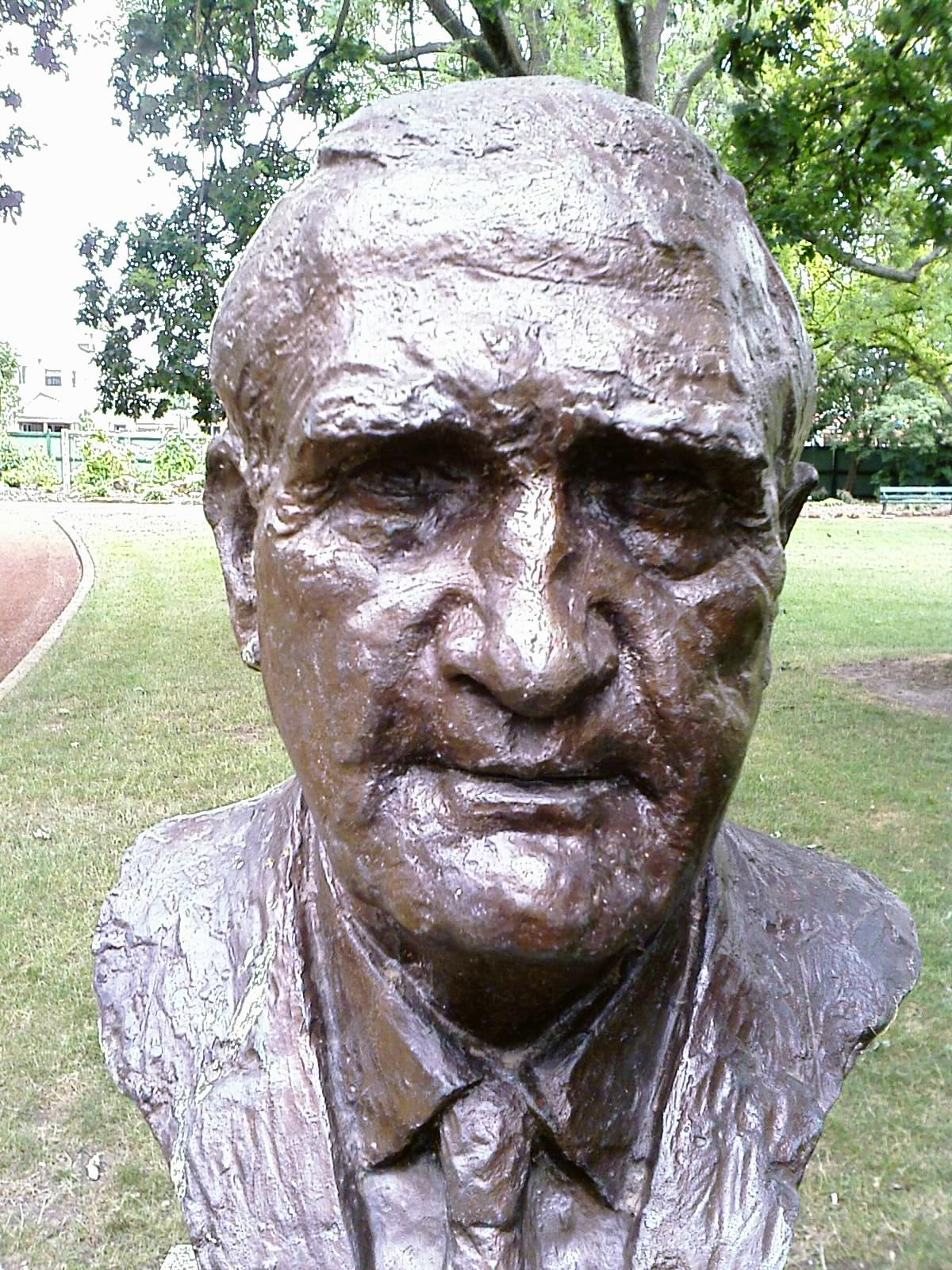
Bust of John McEwen by sculptor Victor Greenhalgh located in the Prime Minister's Avenue in the Ballarat Botanical Gardens

McEwen was appointed a Member of the Order of the Companions of Honour (CH) in 1969. He was knighted in 1971 after his retirement from politics, becoming a Knight Grand Cross of the Order of St Michael and St George (GCMG). The Japanese government conferred on him the Grand Cordon, Order of the Rising Sun in 1973.

== Personal life and death ==
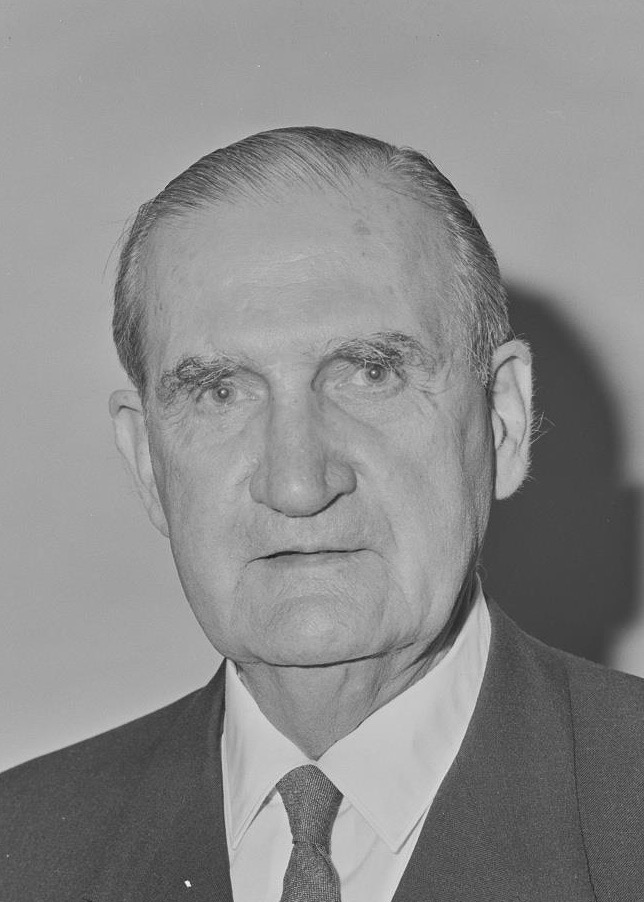
McEwen in retirement in 1973.

On 21 September 1921, he married Anne Mills McLeod, known as Annie; they had no children. In 1966, she was made a Dame Commander of the Order of the British Empire (DBE). After a long illness Dame Anne McEwen died on 10 February 1967.

At the time of becoming prime minister in December of that year, McEwen was a widower, being the first Australian prime minister unmarried during his term of office. (The next such case was Julia Gillard, prime minister 2010–13, who had a domestic partner although unwed.)

On 26 July 1968, McEwen married Mary Eileen Byrne, his personal secretary for 15 years, at Wesley Church, Melbourne; he was aged 68, she was 46. In retirement he distanced himself from politics, undertook some consulting work, and travelled to Japan and South Africa. He had no children by any of his marriages.

McEwen had severe dermatitis for most of his adult life. He recounted that "for literally months at a time, I would be walking about Parliament House with my feet bleeding and damaged." The pain became unbearable in later years, and he began refusing food in order to hasten his death; he died of self-imposed starvation on 20 November 1980, aged 80. McEwen was cremated, and his estate was sworn for probate at $2,180,479.

== See also ==
- McEwen ministry

Political offices
Preceded by Thomas Paterson	Minister for the Interior; 1937–1939	Succeeded by Harry Foll
Preceded by Sir Henry Gullett	Minister for External Affairs; 1940	Succeeded by Frederick Stewart
Preceded by Arthur Fadden	Minister for Air; Minister for Civil Aviation; 1940–1941	Succeeded by Arthur Drakeford
Preceded by Reginald Pollard	Minister for Commerce and Agriculture; 1949–1956	Succeeded by William McMahon
Preceded by Neil O'Sullivan	Minister for Trade and Industry; 1956–1971	Succeeded by Doug Anthony
Preceded by Harold Holt	Prime Minister of Australia; 1967–1968	Succeeded by John Gorton
New title	Deputy Prime Minister of Australia; 1968–1971	Succeeded by Doug Anthony
Party political offices
Preceded by Arthur Fadden	Leader of the Country Party; 1958–1971	Succeeded by Doug Anthony
Preceded by Arthur Fadden	Deputy Leader of the Country Party of Australia; 1943–1958	Succeeded by Charles Davidson
