= Shire of Rutherglen =

Coordinates: 36°03′S 146°28′E

- Local government area
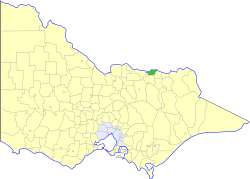
- Location in Victoria
- The Shire of Rutherglen as at its dissolution in 1994
- Country: Australia
- State: Victoria
- Region: Hume
- Established: 1862
- Council seat: Rutherglen

Area
  - Total: 530.9 km^{2} (205.0 sq mi)

Population
  - Total: 3,560 (1992)
  - Density: 6.706/km^{2} (17.367/sq mi)
- County: Bogong
LGAs around Shire of Rutherglen
Corowa (NSW)	Greater Hume (NSW)	Greater Hume (NSW)
Yarrawonga	Shire of Rutherglen	Chiltern
Wangaratta	Wangaratta	Chiltern

The Shire of Rutherglen was a local government area about 275 kilometres (171 mi) north-northeast of Melbourne, the state capital of Victoria, Australia. The shire covered an area of 530.9 square kilometres (205.0 sq mi), and existed from 1862 until 1994.

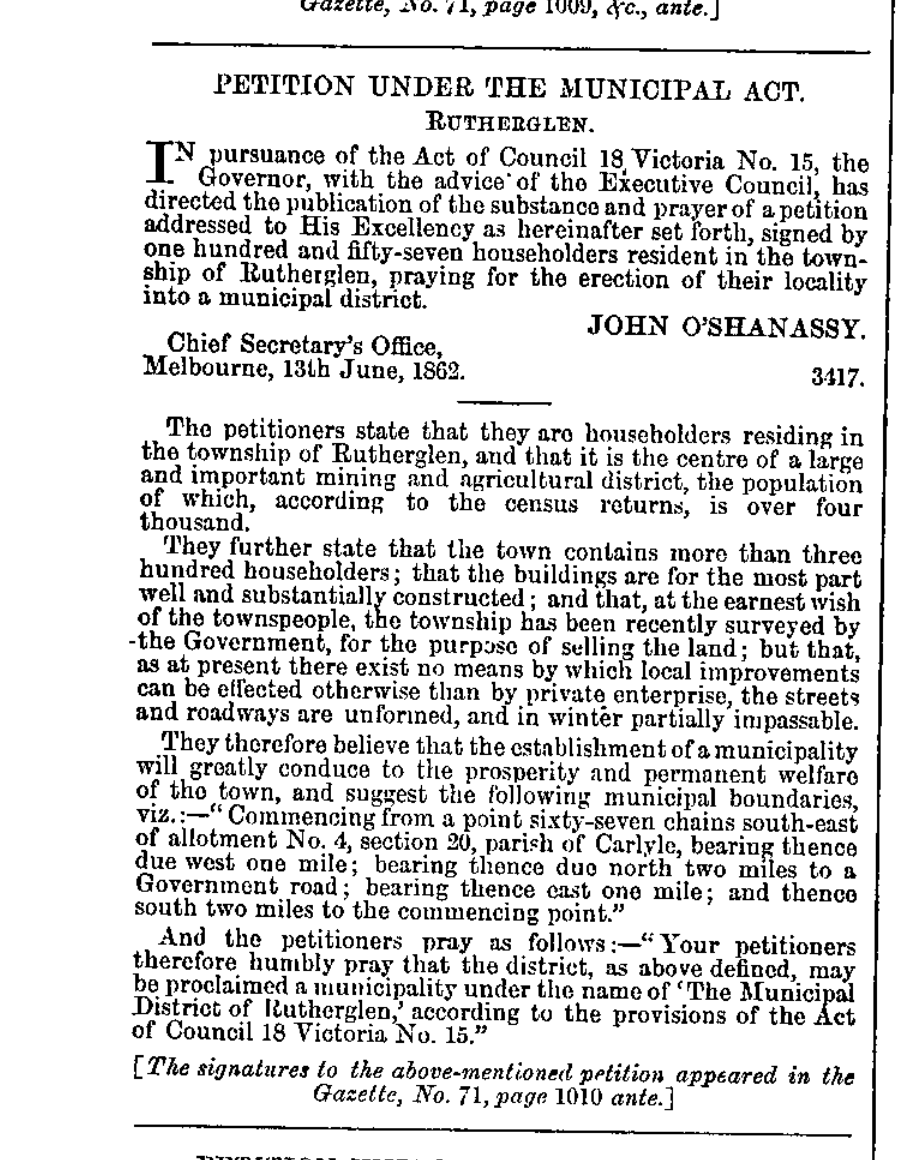
Rutherglen petitions to be a Municipal District 1862

== History ==
Rutherglen was incorporated as a road district on 12 September 1862, and became a shire on 16 June 1871. Part of its Lilliput Riding was lost to the Shire of Chiltern in February 1917. On 15 December 1920, the Borough of Rutherglen, which had been gazetted on 12 September 1862, with an area of 518 hectares (1,280 acres), was merged into the shire as its Central Riding.

On 18 November 1994, the Shire of Rutherglen was abolished, and along with parts of the Shires of Beechworth, Chiltern and Yackandandah, was merged into the newly created Shire of Indigo.

== Wards ==
Rutherglen was divided into three wards, each of which elected three councillors:

- Central Ward
- East Ward
- West Ward

== Towns and localities ==
- Browns Plains
- Cornishtown
- Gooramadda
- Great Northern
- Lilliput
- Prentice North
- Rutherglen*
- Wahgunyah (opposite Corowa, New South Wales)

* Council seat.

== Population ==
Year	Population
1954	2,897
1958	2,990*
1961	2,655
1966	2,552
1971	2,473
1976	2,612
1981	2,774
1986	2,980
1991	3,369

* Estimate in the 1958 Victorian Year Book.
