= 1907 Echuca by-election =

Australian federal by-election

- 10 July 1907

The Echuca seat in the House of Representatives
- Registered: 31,183
- Turnout: 22,329 (71.5%)
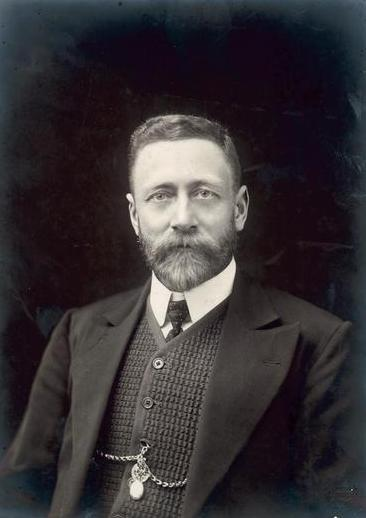

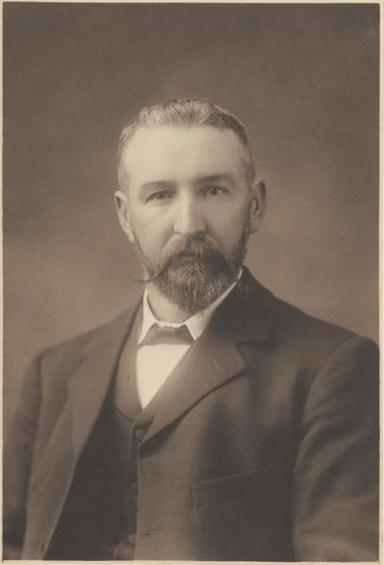
	First party	Second party
Candidate	Albert Palmer	Thomas Kennedy
Party	Anti-Socialist	Protectionist
Popular vote	11,618	10,481
Percentage	52.6%	47.4%
Swing	▲2.5	▼2.5
MP before election
Albert Palmer
Anti-Socialist
Elected MP
Albert Palmer
Anti-Socialist

A by-election was held for the Australian House of Representatives seat of Echuca on 10 July 1907. This was triggered after the result of the 1906 election, which saw Anti-Socialist candidate Albert Palmer narrowly defeat Protectionist MP Thomas Kennedy by just 32 votes. This election was declared void by the Court of Disputed Returns.

Palmer was re-elected at the by-election with an increased majority.

== Results ==
1907 Echuca by-election
Party	Candidate	Votes	%	±%
Anti-Socialist	Albert Palmer	11,618	52.57	+2.47
Protectionist	Thomas Kennedy	10,481	47.43	−2.47
Total formal votes		22,099	98.97	+4.34
Informal votes		230	1.03	−4.34
Registered electors		31,183		
Turnout		22,329	71.61	+16.32
Anti-Socialist hold		Swing	+2.47	
