= United Shire of Beechworth =

- Local government area
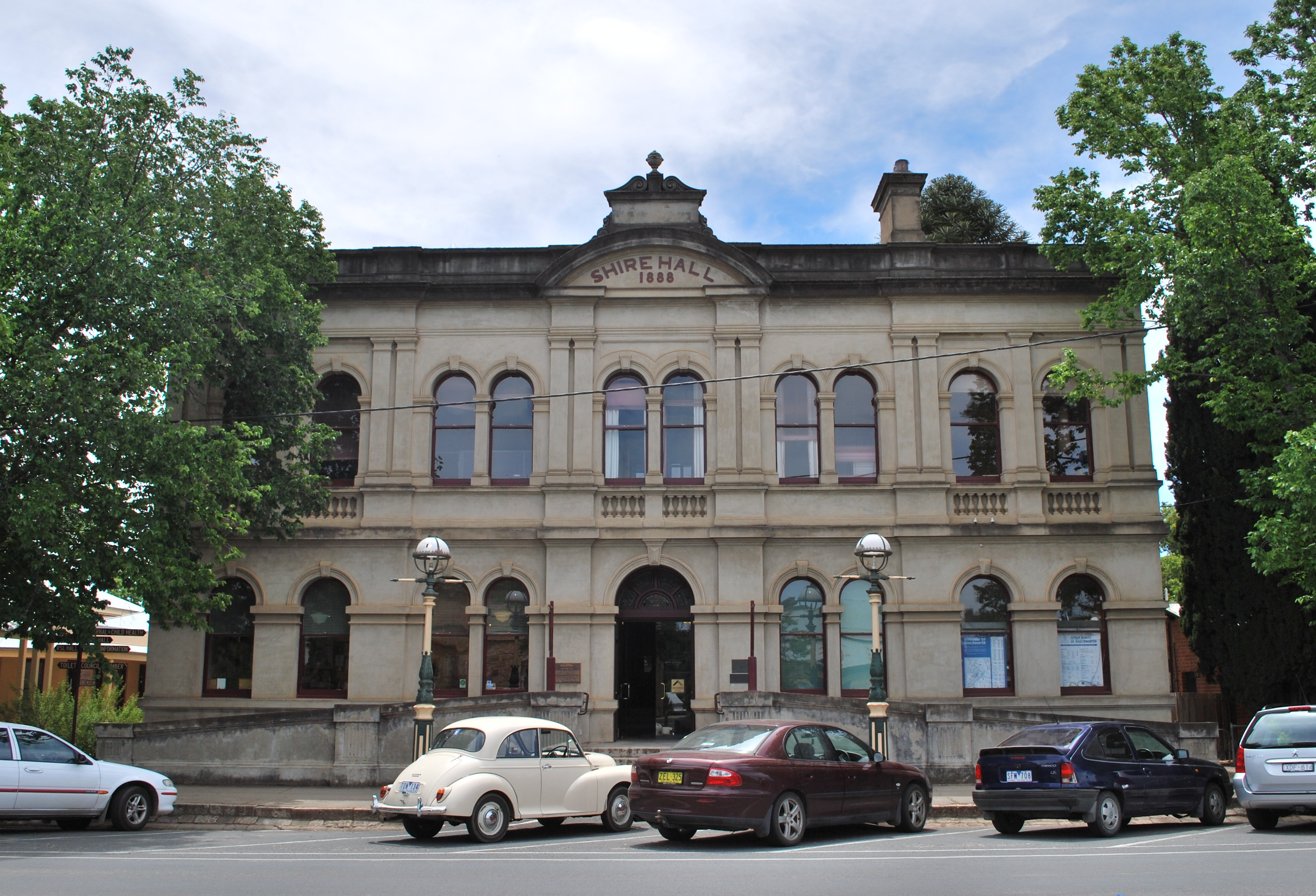
- Shire Hall
- The United Shire of Beechworth as at its dissolution in 1994
- Country: Australia
- State: Victoria
- Region: Hume
- Established: 1856
- Council seat: Beechworth

Area
  - Total: 771.57 km^{2} (297.90 sq mi)

Population
  - Total: 5,210 (1992)
  - Density: 6.752/km^{2} (17.489/sq mi)
- County: Bogong
LGAs around United Shire of Beechworth
Wangaratta	Chiltern	Wodonga
Wangaratta	United Shire of Beechworth	Yackandandah
Oxley	Myrtleford	Yackandandah

The United Shire of Beechworth was a local government area about 270 kilometres (168 mi) northeast of Melbourne, the state capital of Victoria, Australia. The shire covered an area of 771.57 square kilometres (297.9 sq mi), and existed from 1856 until 1994.

== History ==
Beechworth United Shire originated as two separate entities: the Borough of Beechworth, first created as a municipal district on 23 August 1856, becoming a borough on 11 September 1863, and the Shire of Beechworth, created on 27 December 1865 as a union of the Stanley (10 December 1862) and Wooragee (30 March 1863) Road Districts. The two entities merged on 29 December 1871, to form the United Shire of Beechworth. At its dissolution, it was the only local government entity remaining in Victoria which was styled as a 'United Shire', although many others were also the results of amalgamations.

On 18 November 1994, the United Shire of Beechworth was abolished, and along with parts of the Shires of Chiltern, Rutherglen and Yackandandah, was merged into the newly created Shire of Indigo. The area around Mudgegonga, in the southeast of the former United Shire, was transferred to the newly created Alpine Shire.

== Wards ==
The United Shire of Beechworth was divided into four ridings, each of which elected three councillors:

- East Central Riding
- West Central Riding
- North Riding
- South Riding

== Towns and localities ==
- Baarmutha
- Beechworth*
- Bowman
- Brookfield
- Everton
- Gapsted
- Murmungee
- Reids Creek
- Silver Creek
- Stanley
- Woolshed
- Wooragee

* Council seat.

== Population ==
Year	Population
1954	4,417
1958	4,580*
1961	4,845
1966	4,804
1971	4,506
1976	4,618
1981	4,673
1986	4,883
1991	4,966

* Estimate in the 1958 Victorian Year Book.
