= Division of Moira =

Former Australian federal electoral division

Moira Australian House of Representatives Division
- Created: 1901
- Abolished: 1906
- Namesake: County of Moira

The Division of Moira was an Australian electoral division in the state of Victoria. It was located in the north-east of the state, covering much of the County of Moira, after which it was named. It included the towns of Benalla and Yarrawonga. The division was proclaimed in 1900, and was one of the original 65 divisions to be contested at the first federal election. It was abolished at the redistribution of 13 July 1906.

== Members ==
Image	Member	Party	Term	Notes
	Thomas Kennedy (1860–1929)	Protectionist	29 March 1901 – 12 December 1906	Previously held the Victorian Legislative Assembly seat of Benalla and Yarrawonga. Failed to win the Division of Echuca after Moira was abolished in 1906
