= James McColl (politician) =

Australian politician (1844–1929)

The Honourable James McColl
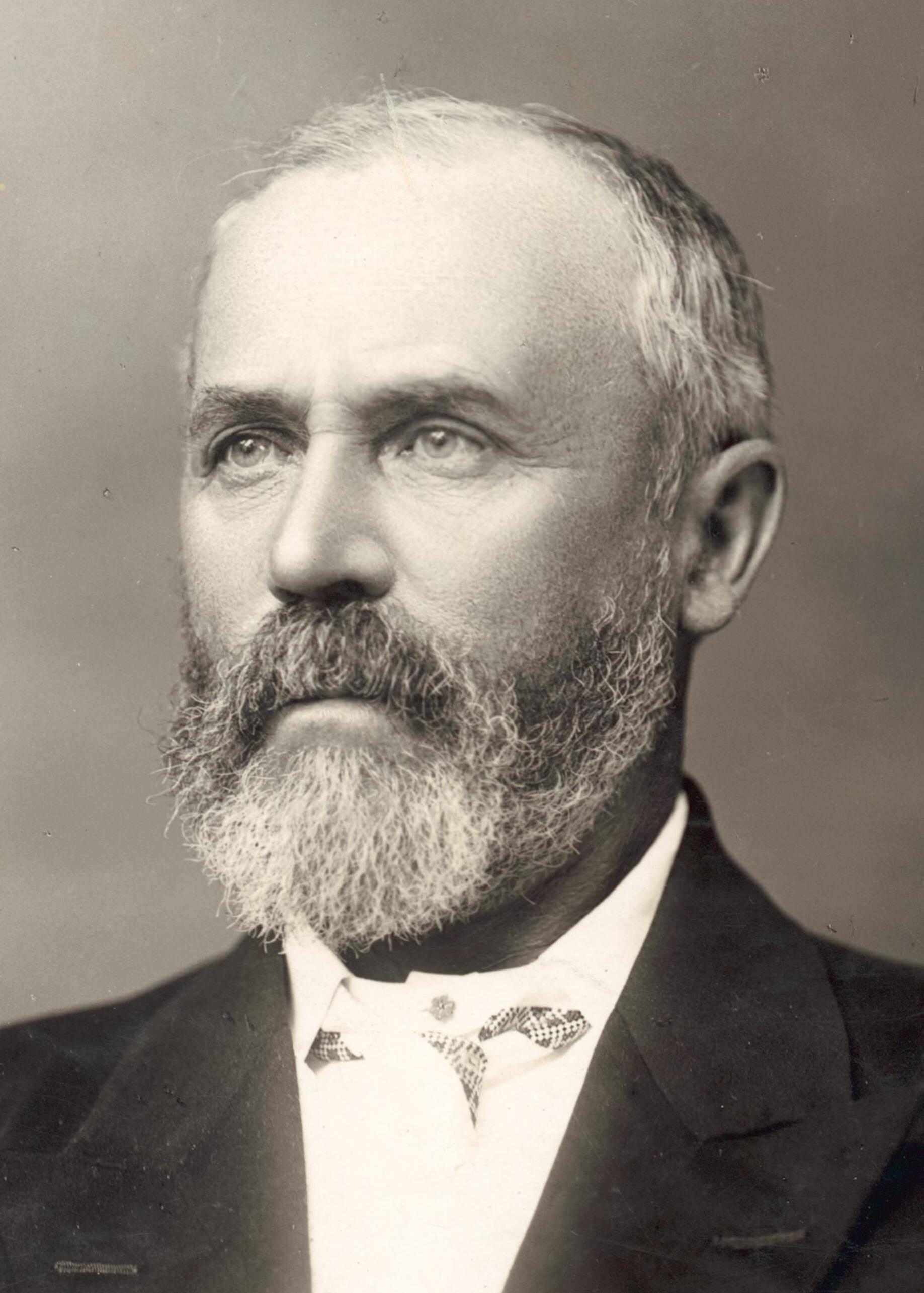

Vice-President of the Executive Council
- In office 24 June 1913 – 17 September 1914
- Prime Minister: Joseph Cook
- Preceded by: Gregor McGregor
- Succeeded by: Albert Gardiner

Senator for Victoria
- In office 1 January 1907 – 5 September 1914

Member of the Australian Parliament for Echuca
- In office 29 March 1901 – 8 November 1906
- Preceded by: New seat
- Succeeded by: Albert Palmer

Personal details
- Born: 31 January 1844 South Shields, Durham, England
- Died: 20 February 1929 (aged 85) Melbourne, Victoria, Australia
- Party: Protectionist (1901–04); Anti-Socialist (1904–09); Liberal (1909–14)
- Spouses: Emily Boyle (m. 1867–1898) Sarah Ann Thomas (m. 1900)
- Relations: Hugh McColl (father)
- Occupation: Insurance agent

James Hiers McColl (31 January 1844 – 20 February 1929) was an Australian politician. Prior to Federation in 1901, he was a member of the Victorian Legislative Assembly (1886–1900) and twice held ministerial office. He was known for his interest in agriculture, particularly new irrigation techniques. In the new federal parliament he first represented the Division of Echuca (1901–1906) in the House of Representatives and then served as a Senator for Victoria (1907–1914). He was Vice-President of the Executive Council in the Cook Government (1913–1914).

== Early life ==
McColl was born in South Shields, County Durham, England, the son of Hugh McColl, and migrated with his family to Australia in 1853, but his mother died before they landed in Melbourne. McColl was educated at the Model School, Sandhurst and for a time at Scotch College, Melbourne. He married Emily Boyle in January 1867 and subsequently became an insurance agent and legal manager.

== Colonial politics ==
McColl supported irrigation and closer settlement and won the seat of Mandurang in the Victorian Legislative Assembly in 1886, moving to the seat of Gunbower in 1889. He was Minister of Mines and of Water Supply from January 1893 to September 1894 and President of the Board of Land and Works, Commissioner of Crown Lands and Survey and Minister of Forests from December 1899 to November 1900. As minister, he was responsible for the first purchase of large estates so that they could be sub-divided for closer settlement.

== Federal politics ==
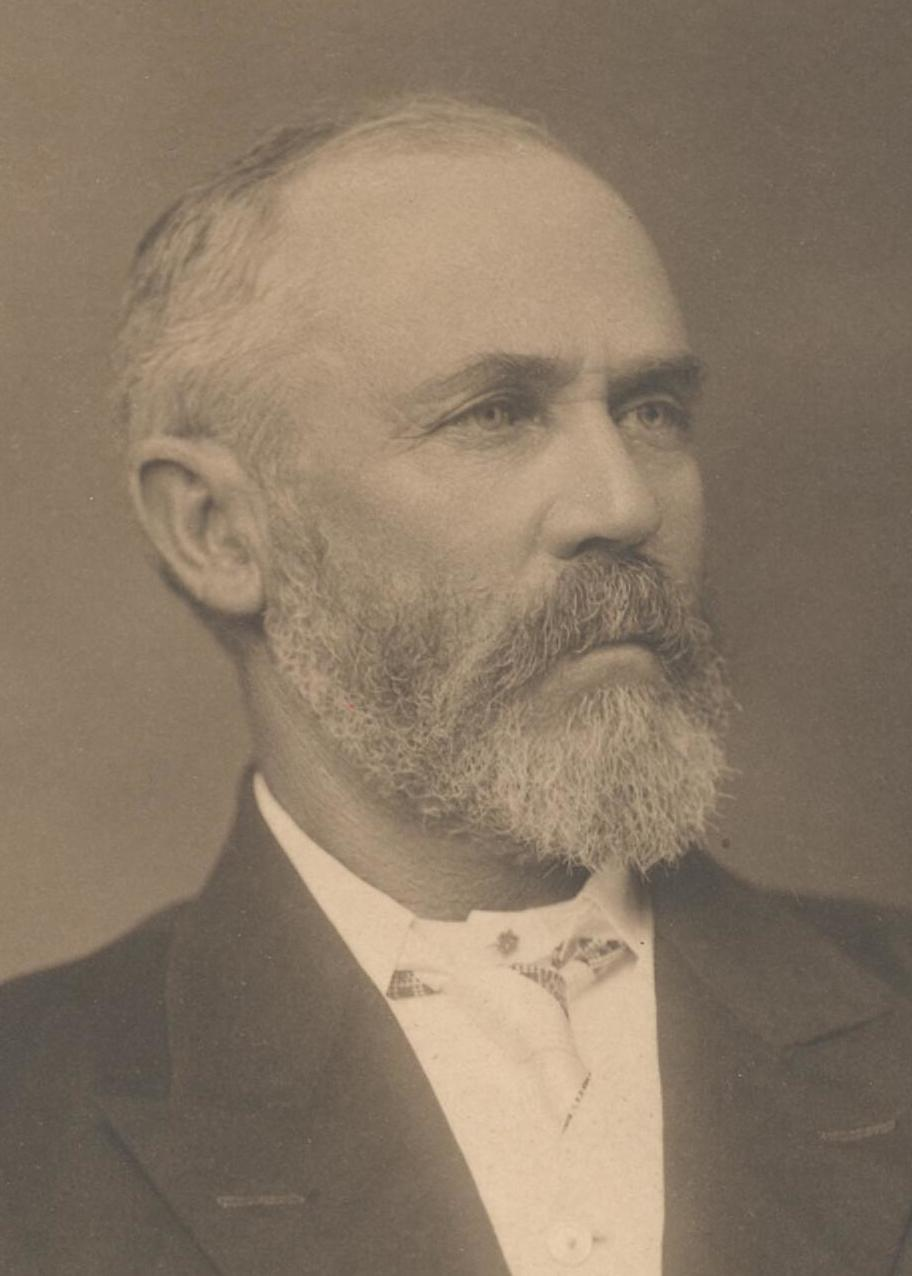
Portrait of McColl by Swiss Studios

McColl was a strong supporter of Australian federation and won the House of Representatives seat of Echuca at the first federal election, in 1901 as a Protectionist. At the 1906 election, he moved to the Senate, his term commencing on 1 January 1907. He was the first person to have served in both houses of the federal parliament.

He was appointed Vice-President of the Executive Council in the Cook Ministry from June 1913 to September 1914. He was defeated at the 1914 election.

== Personal life ==
McColl bought an irrigation farm at Gunbower (near Cohuna), but later retired to the Melbourne suburb of Deepdene. His first wife had died in 1898 and he remarried Sarah Ann Thomas in January 1900. He died in Melbourne (aged 85), survived by his wife and their two sons and a daughter and two daughters from his first marriage.

== Notes ==
Political offices
| Preceded by Gregor McGregor | Vice-President of the Executive Council; 1913–1914 | Succeeded by Albert Gardiner |
Parliament of Australia
| New division | Member for Echuca; 1901–1906 | Succeeded by Albert Palmer |
