= Electoral district of Benalla and Yarrawonga =

Former electoral district of Victoria, Australia

Benalla and Yarrawonga Victoria—Legislative Assembly
- State: Victoria
- Created: 1889
- Abolished: 1904
- Namesake: Benalla, Yarrawonga
- Demographic: Rural
- Coordinates: 36°15′S 146°0′E

The Electoral district of Benalla and Yarrawonga was an electoral district of the Victorian Legislative Assembly. Its area was defined by the Electoral Act Amendment Act 1888.

== Members of Benalla and Yarrawonga ==
Member	Party	Term
John Brock	Unaligned	1889–1892
James Campbell	Unaligned	1892–1893
John Templeton	Unaligned	1893
Thomas Kennedy	Unaligned	1893–1901
William Hall	Unaligned	1901–1903
John Carlisle	Commonwealth Liberal	1903–1904

== See also ==
- Parliaments of the Australian states and territories
- List of members of the Victorian Legislative Assembly
