= Shire of Chiltern =

Coordinates: 36°09′S 146°36′E

- Local government area
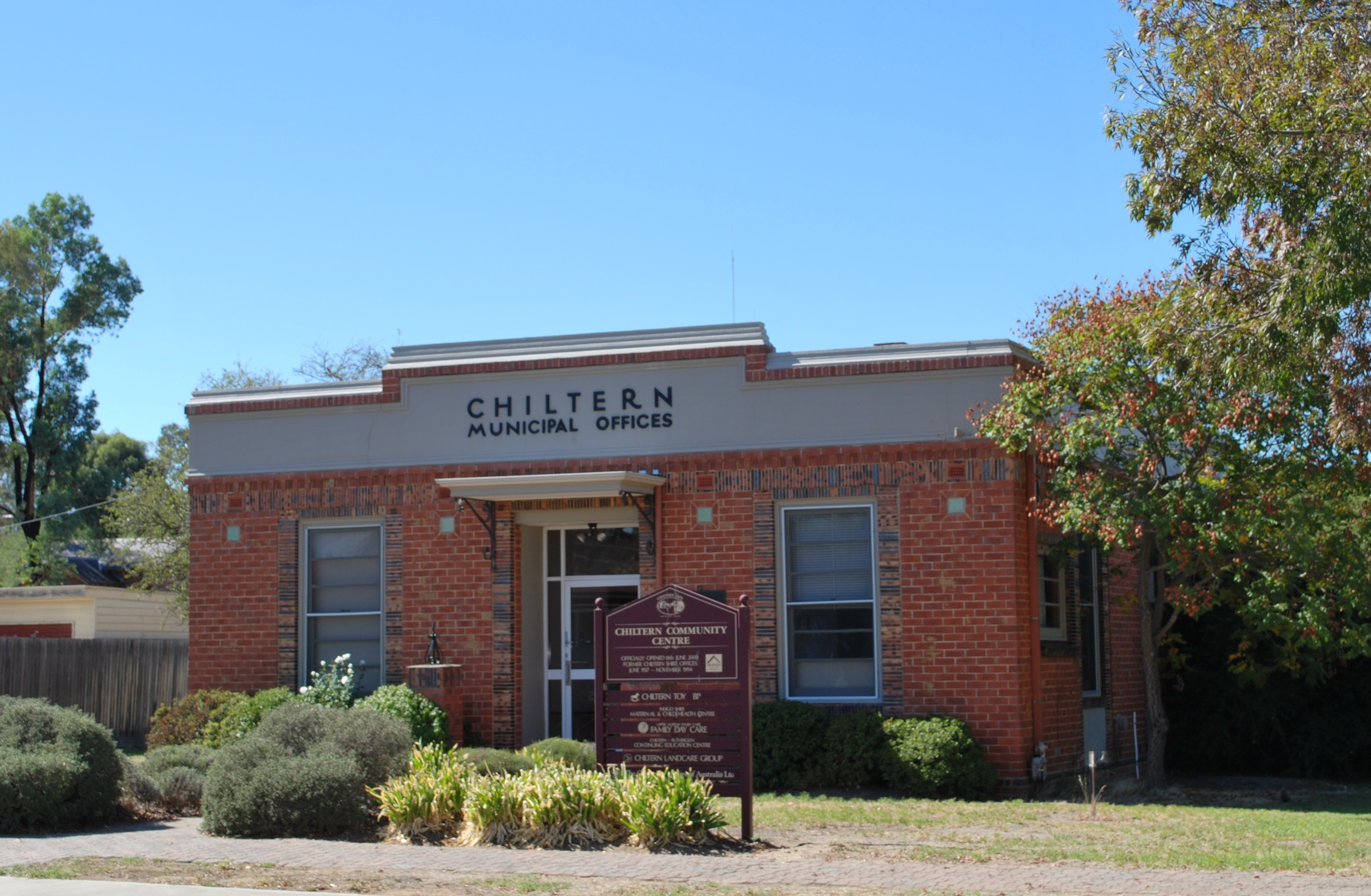
- Former Municipal offices
- The Shire of Chiltern as at its dissolution in 1994
- Country: Australia
- State: Victoria
- Region: Hume
- Established: 1862
- Council seat: Chiltern

Area
  - Total: 501.64 km^{2} (193.68 sq mi)

Population
  - Total(s): 2,770 (1992)
  - Density: 5.522/km^{2} (14.302/sq mi)
- County: Bogong
LGAs around Shire of Chiltern
Rutherglen	Greater Hume (NSW)	Greater Hume (NSW)
Rutherglen	Shire of Chiltern	Wodonga
Wangaratta	Beechworth	Yackandandah

The Shire of Chiltern was a local government area about 280 kilometres (174 mi) north-northeast of Melbourne, the state capital of Victoria, Australia. The shire covered an area of 501.64 square kilometres (193.7 sq mi), and existed from 1862 until 1994.

== History ==
Chiltern was first incorporated as a road district on 1 December 1862, and became a shire on 11 May 1874. It annexed the Barnawartha Ward from the Shire of Yackandandah on 14 May 1913, and the Lilliput Ward from the Shire of Rutherglen in February 1917. On 10 October 1989, it also annexed parts of the Belvoir Ward of the Rural City of Wodonga.

On 18 November 1994, the Shire of Chiltern was abolished, and along with parts of the Shires of Beechworth, Rutherglen and Yackandandah, was merged into the newly created Shire of Indigo. However, the Barnawartha North region was annexed to the Rural City of Wodonga.

== Wards ==
The Shire of Chiltern was divided into three ridings, each of which elected three councillors:

- Barnawartha Riding
- Chiltern Riding
- Indigo Riding

== Towns and localities ==
- Barnawartha
- Barnawartha North
- Chiltern*
- Chiltern Valley
- Indigo Valley

* Council seat.

== Population ==
Year	Population
1954	1,613
1958	1,650*
1961	1,652
1966	1,521
1971	1,400
1976	1,543
1981	1,959
1986	2,215
1991	2,628

* Estimate in the 1958 Victorian Year Book.
