= Hugh McColl (pioneer) =

Australian politician

Hugh McColl (22 January 1819 – 2 April 1885) was a Scottish-born irrigation pioneer and politician in Australia.

McColl was born in Glasgow, eldest son of James McColl and his wife Agnes, née Cowan and worked for fifteen years as a bookseller. Marrying in 1843, the family decided to emigrate to Victoria; McColl's wife died on 2 January 1853 on board the Emigrant as they approached Melbourne.

McColl worked as a publisher, commercial traveller and legal manager for a Sandhurst gold-mining company. From 1865 McColl was honorary secretary of the Sandhurst and Castlemaine Water Supply Committee, this supported development of the Coliban River. In 1874 McColl became secretary of the Grand Victorian North West Canal, Irrigation, Traffic and Motive Power Co. Ltd. The plan to provide vast canals for inland Australia eventually faded away except for McColl's vision for canals which later became the basis of the Goulburn irrigation system.

After three failed attempts, McColl was elected member for the Mandurang in the Victorian Legislative Assembly in 1880 and advanced water conservation and irrigation. His son James Hiers McColl (1844-1929) was minister of water supply in 1893-94 and later a Federal politician.
