= Albert Palmer (Australian politician) =

Australian politician

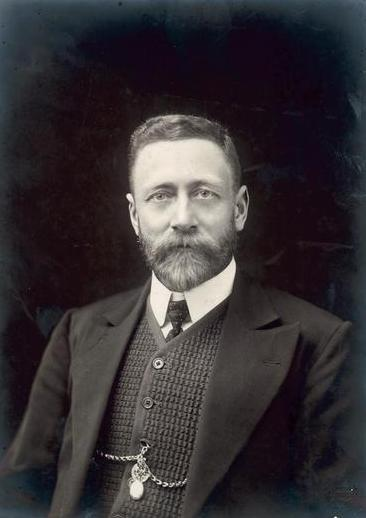

Member of the Australian Parliament for Echuca
- In office 12 December 1906 – 14 August 1919
- Preceded by: James McColl
- Succeeded by: William Hill

Personal details
- Born: 1859 Melbourne, Colony of Victoria
- Died: 14 August 1919 (aged 59–60)
- Party: Anti-Socialist (1906–09); Liberal (1909–17); Nationalist (1917–19)
- Occupation: Grazier

Albert Clayton Palmer (1859 – 14 August 1919) was an Australian politician. He was a member of the Australian House of Representatives from 1906 to 1907 and from 1907 until his death, representing the electorate of Echuca for the Anti-Socialist Party and its successors the Commonwealth Liberal Party and Nationalist Party.

Palmer was born in the Melbourne suburb of Collingwood, and later moved to Euroa with his father and brother when his father purchased the Euroa flour mill. Upon the death of their father, the brothers inherited the mill and operated the business as Palmer Brothers; Palmer also held grazing interests. He was a Shire of Euroa councillor from 1888 to 1893. He was involved with the Australian Natives Association and was a supporter of Federation before becoming involved in a number of influential conservative organisations. In 1901–02, he was one of the leaders and the second president of the Kyabram Reform Movement, a rural group that aimed to reduce the number of state parliamentarians, and in 1902 was elected president of the National Citizens Reform League. Palmer was also a lay Methodist preacher and Sunday school superintendent, a strong temperance advocate and a prominent member of the Loyal Orange Institution and the Protestant Federation. He was an unsuccessful candidate for the Moira seat at the 1903 federal election.

In 1906 he was elected to the Australian House of Representatives for the seat of Echuca as an Anti-Socialist Party candidate, defeating the sitting member for the abolished Moira, Thomas Kennedy, by just 32 votes. This election was declared void by the Court of Disputed Returns, and Palmer won the subsequent by-election more comfortably. Palmer's Anti-Socialist Party merged into the Commonwealth Liberal Party in 1910, which in turn merged into the Nationalist Party in 1917. Originally a free trader, he evolved into a "moderate protectionist" during his time in the House. He opposed a parliamentary pay rise on the basis that the voters should have the opportunity to express their opinion at an election first. He held the seat until his death from pneumonia in 1919.

Parliament of Australia
Preceded by James McColl	Member for Echuca; 1906–1919	Succeeded by William Hill
