= William Hill (Australian politician) =

Australian politician (1866–1939)

The Honourable William Hill
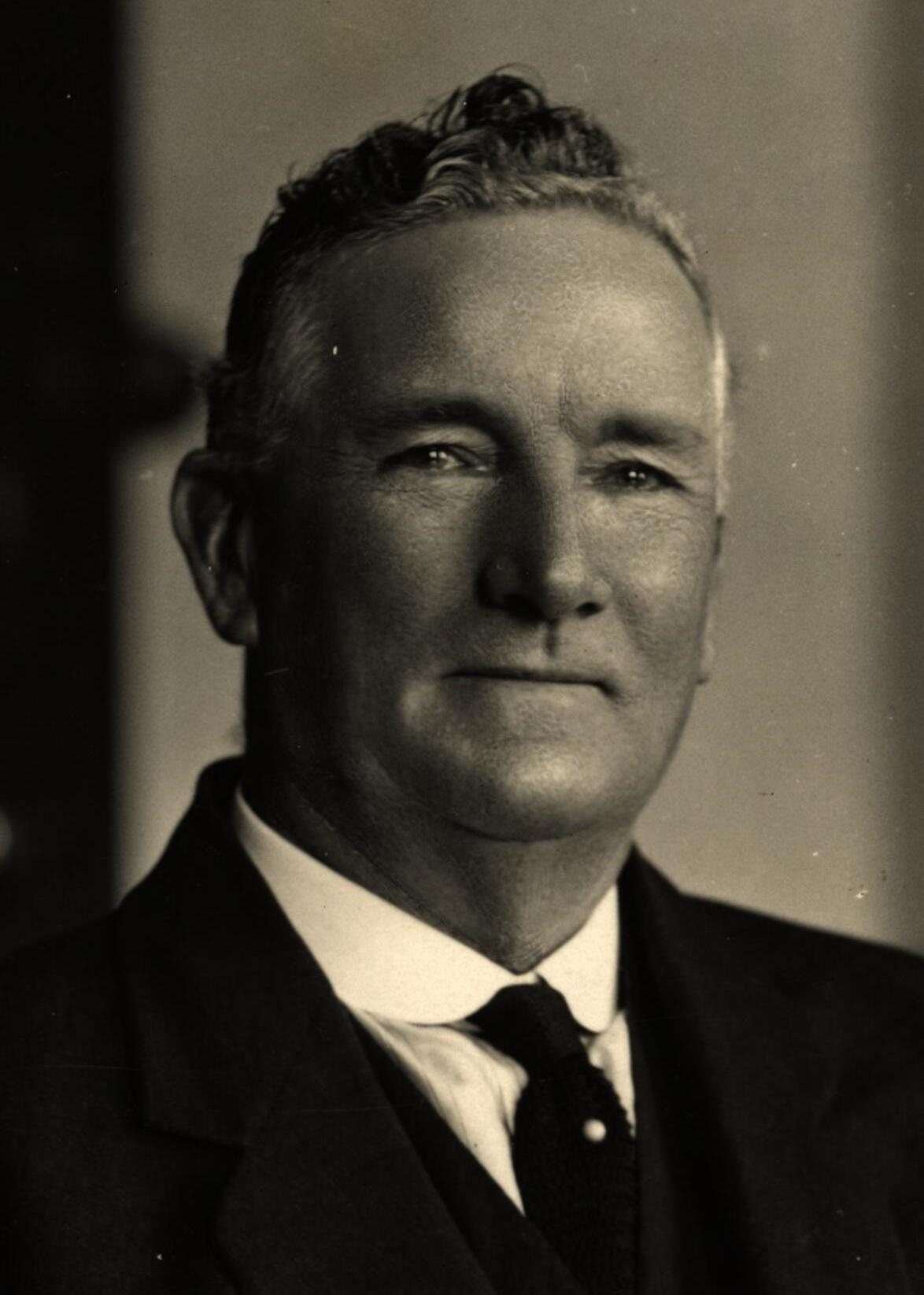

Minister for Works and Railways
- In office 8 August 1924 – 29 November 1928
- Prime Minister: Stanley Bruce
- Preceded by: Percy Stewart
- Succeeded by: William Gibson

Member of the Australian Parliament for Echuca
- In office 20 September 1919 – 7 August 1934
- Preceded by: Albert Palmer
- Succeeded by: John McEwen

Personal details
- Born: 14 April 1866 Dunolly, Victoria
- Died: 15 November 1939 (aged 73) Nar Nar Goon, Victoria
- Party: Australian Country Party
- Relations: Steph Hodgins-May (great-great-granddaughter)
- Occupation: Farmer

William Caldwell Hill (14 April 1866 – 15 November 1939) was an Australian politician. He was a member of the Country Party and served in the House of Representatives from 1919 to 1934. He was Minister for Works and Railways in the Bruce–Page government from 1924 to 1928.

== Early life ==
Hill was born on 14 April 1866 at Burnt Creek near Dunolly, Victoria. He was the son of English immigrants Sarah (née Baker) and John Hill; his mother was illiterate. His father and uncle ran the local flour mill, but after the mill burned down the family moved to Stradbroke to take up a selection of uncleared forest.

Hill was educated at a part-time school in Stradbroke before joining the clerical division of Victorian Railways. He served as stationmaster at Elphinstone, during which time he would walk several miles to Castlemaine to attend evening classes. He married Lucy Shields in 1892; her father Edward Shields was mayor of Chewton. Following the death of his father-in-law, Hill left the railways to manage the family's tannery in Chewton. He served on the Chewton Borough Council from 1900 to 1906 and was secretary of the Castlemaine Rifle Clubs' Union.

== Farming ==
In 1906, Hill took up a portion of David Mitchell's subdivided estate at Colbinabbin. He served as the secretary of the Colbinabbin Progress Association and in 1915 was elected secretary of the Wheat Pool Vigilance Committee, formed by farmers concerned that the government and wheat merchants were conspiring to reduce the price of wheat. In 1916, Hill was elected as the founding president of the Victorian Farmers' Union (VFU). He was also a delegate to the Australian Farmers' Federal Organization, a member of the Victorian Wheat Commission's advisory council, a growers' representative on the Australian Wheat Board, and chairman of the Farmers' Advocate newspaper published in Melbourne. He led a movement to supply cheaper superphosphate to farmers and served as chairman of the Phosphate Co-operative Company of Australia.

== Politics ==
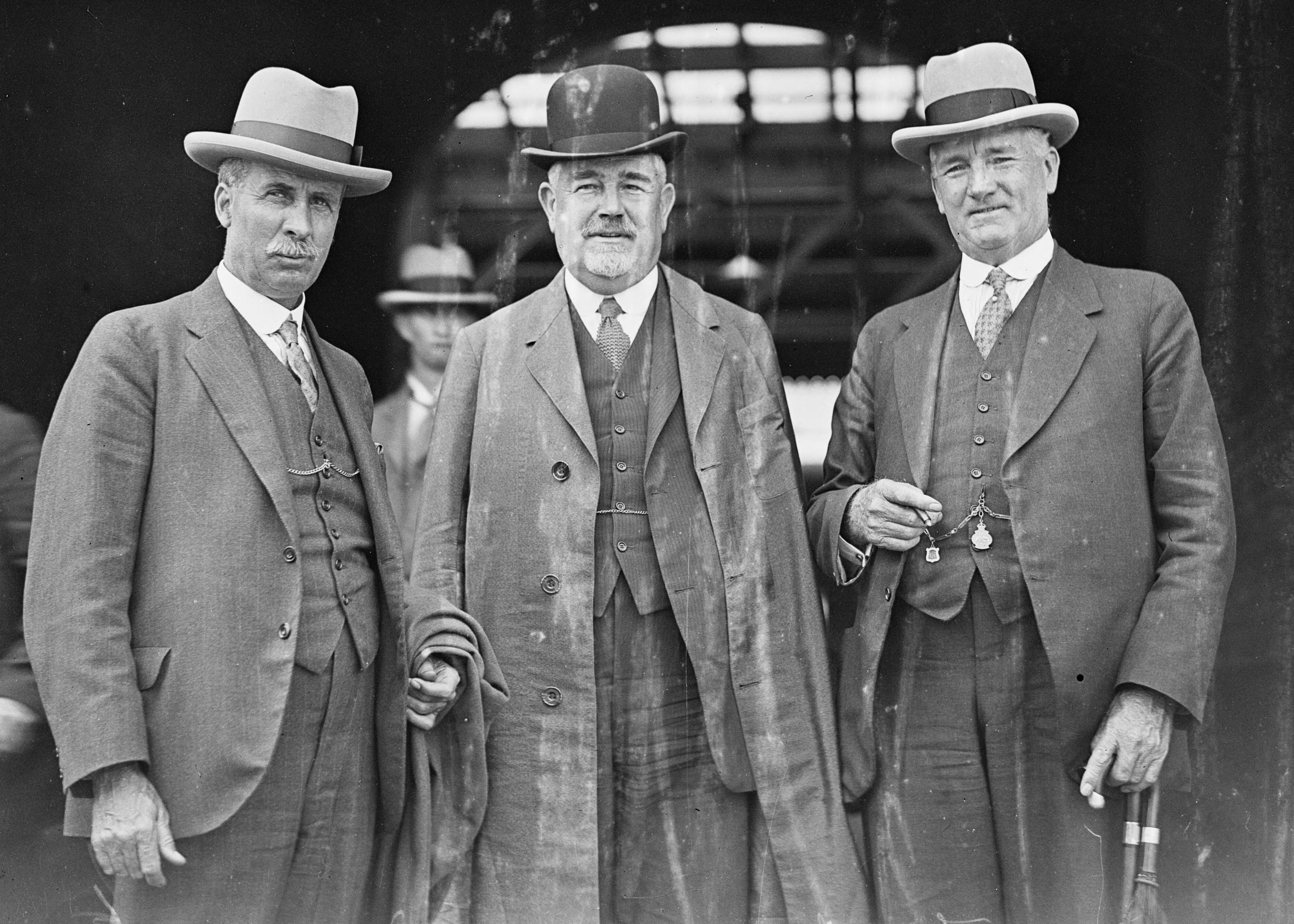
Hill in 1927 with Nationalist senators George Pearce and Alexander McLachlan

On 20 September 1919, at the by-election caused by the death of Albert Palmer, he won the House of Representatives Division of Echuca as a Victorian Farmers' Union candidate. In 1920 he helped form the Country Party. From 8 August 1924 to 29 November 1928 he was Minister for Works and Railways in the Bruce–Page government. During his period of office he commenced the standardisation of the railway gauges by the construction of the North Coast railway line from Kyogle, to South Brisbane, the construction of the rail line from Oodnadatta, South Australia, to Alice Springs by Commonwealth Railways, the introduction of a Federal aid road scheme—which provided funding to the states for road construction—and the building of the Hume Dam, which he promoted as president of the inter-governmental River Murray Water Commission. He retired from Parliament on 7 August 1934, because he was unwilling to sign a pledge to vote in parliament as instructed by his party, and he was succeeded as the member for Echuca by John McEwen, future leader of the Federal Country Party.

== Later life ==
Hill died at Nar Nar Goon, survived by his wife Bella and by six children.

In 2024, Hill's great-great-granddaughter Steph Hodgins-May replaced retiring Victorian Greens senator Janet Rice, and went on to become Deputy Leader of the Greens in 2026.

== Notes ==
Political offices
Preceded by Percy Stewart	Minister for Works and Railways; 1924–1928	Succeeded by William Gibson
Parliament of Australia
Preceded by Albert Palmer	Member for Echuca; 1919–1934	Succeeded by John McEwen
