= Thomas Kennedy (Australian politician) =

Australian politician

The Honourable Thomas Kennedy
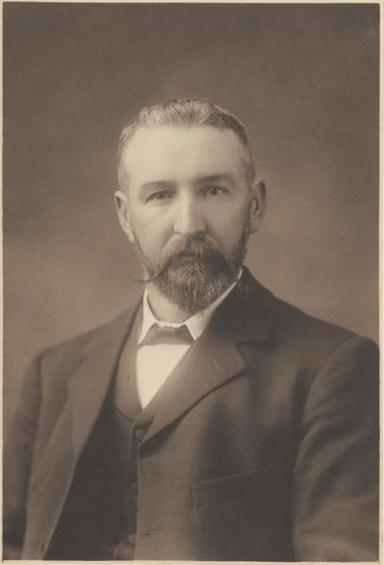

Member of the Australian Parliament for Moira
- In office 29 March 1901 – 12 December 1906
- Preceded by: New seat
- Succeeded by: Division abolished

Personal details
- Born: 1860 Gisborne, Victoria
- Died: 16 February 1929 (aged 68–69) Buffalo, Victoria
- Party: Protectionist Party
- Occupation: Farmer

Thomas Kennedy (1860 – 16 February 1929) was an Australian politician. Born in Gisborne, Victoria, he received a primary education and was a farmer by the age of 17.

In 1893, Kennedy contested the seat of Benalla and Yarrawonga in the Victorian Legislative Assembly at the general election. He received the same number of votes as another candidate, Lieutenant-Colonel John Montgomery Templeton, with the returning officer declaring Templeton the winner on his casting vote. Kennedy then lodged a petition with the Clerk of the Legislative Assembly, alleging irregularities in the electoral process (the Devenish booth had received no electoral roll), and also that Templeton held an office of profit under the crown as a member of the Victorian militia and an official liquidator. In November 1893, the Committee of Elections and Qualifications declared the election in Benalla and Yarrawonga void, although it also ruled that liquidator was not an office of profit under the crown. A by-election was held on 20 November, which Kennedy won.

He remained in the Legislative Assembly until 1901. In that year, he transferred to federal politics, winning the Australian House of Representatives seat of Moira for the Protectionist Party at the first federal election. Kennedy's seat of Moira was abolished in 1906; he contested Echuca instead, but was narrowly defeated by Albert Palmer. He retired from politics and became a farmer at Buffalo. Kennedy died in 1929.

Victorian Legislative Assembly
Preceded by John Templeton	Member for Benalla and Yarrawonga; 1893–1901	Succeeded by William Hall
Australian House of Representatives
New division	Member for Moira; 1901–1906	Division abolished
