= Division of Echuca =

Former Australian federal electoral division

Echuca Australian House of Representatives Division
- Created: 1901
- Abolished: 1937
- Namesake: Echuca

The Division of Echuca was an Australian electoral division in the state of Victoria. The division was proclaimed in 1900, and was one of the original 65 divisions to be contested at the first federal election. After 1919, it was a safe seat for the Country Party. It was abolished in 1937.

The division was named for the town of Echuca. It was located in the Murray Valley area, including the towns of Echuca, Kyabram, Rochester and Shepparton. In 1913, it gained the areas of Seymour, Kilmore, Broadford and Lancefield from the abolished Division of Mernda, and Heathcote from the Division of Bendigo.

When the division of Echuca was abolished in 1937, it was split into three and replaced by:

- the Division of Indi (at the north-eastern portion, including Kyabram, Shepparton, Euroa, Violet Town and Yarrawonga)
- the Division of Bendigo (at the north-western and south-western portions, including Echuca, Rochester, Heathcote and Lancefield)
- the new Division of Deakin (at the south-eastern portion, including Seymour, Broadford and Wandong)

However, 12 years later in 1949, a new Division of Murray was created and it covered similar areas and boundaries to the division of Echuca prior to the latter's abolition, except the areas of Seymour and south of it, which became the new Division of Lalor. The last member for Echuca, John McEwen, became member for Indi during the 12 years, and then became the first member for Murray.

== Members ==
Image	Member	Party	Term	Notes
	James McColl (1844–1929)	Protectionist	29 March 1901 – 1904	Previously held the Victorian Legislative Assembly seat of Gunbower. Transferred to the Senate
	James McColl (1844–1929)	Free Trade	1904 – 1906	Previously held the Victorian Legislative Assembly seat of Gunbower. Transferred to the Senate
	James McColl (1844–1929)	Anti-Socialist	1906 – 8 November 1906	Previously held the Victorian Legislative Assembly seat of Gunbower. Transferred to the Senate
	Albert Palmer (1859–1919)	Anti-Socialist	12 December 1906 – 10 June 1907	Died in office
	Albert Palmer (1859–1919)	Anti-Socialist	10 July 1907– 26 May 1909	Died in office
	Albert Palmer (1859–1919)	Liberal	26 May 1909 – 17 February 1917	Died in office
	Albert Palmer (1859–1919)	Nationalist	17 February 1917 – 14 August 1919	Died in office
	William Hill (1866–1939)	Victorian Farmers' Union	20 September 1919 – 22 January 1920	Served as minister under Bruce. Retired
	William Hill (1866–1939)	Country	22 January 1920 – 7 August 1934	Served as minister under Bruce. Retired
	John McEwen (1900–1980)	Country	15 September 1934 – 23 October 1937	Transferred to the Division of Indi after Echuca was abolished in 1937
