= List of awards and nominations received by Angela Bassett =

Angela Bassett awards and nominations
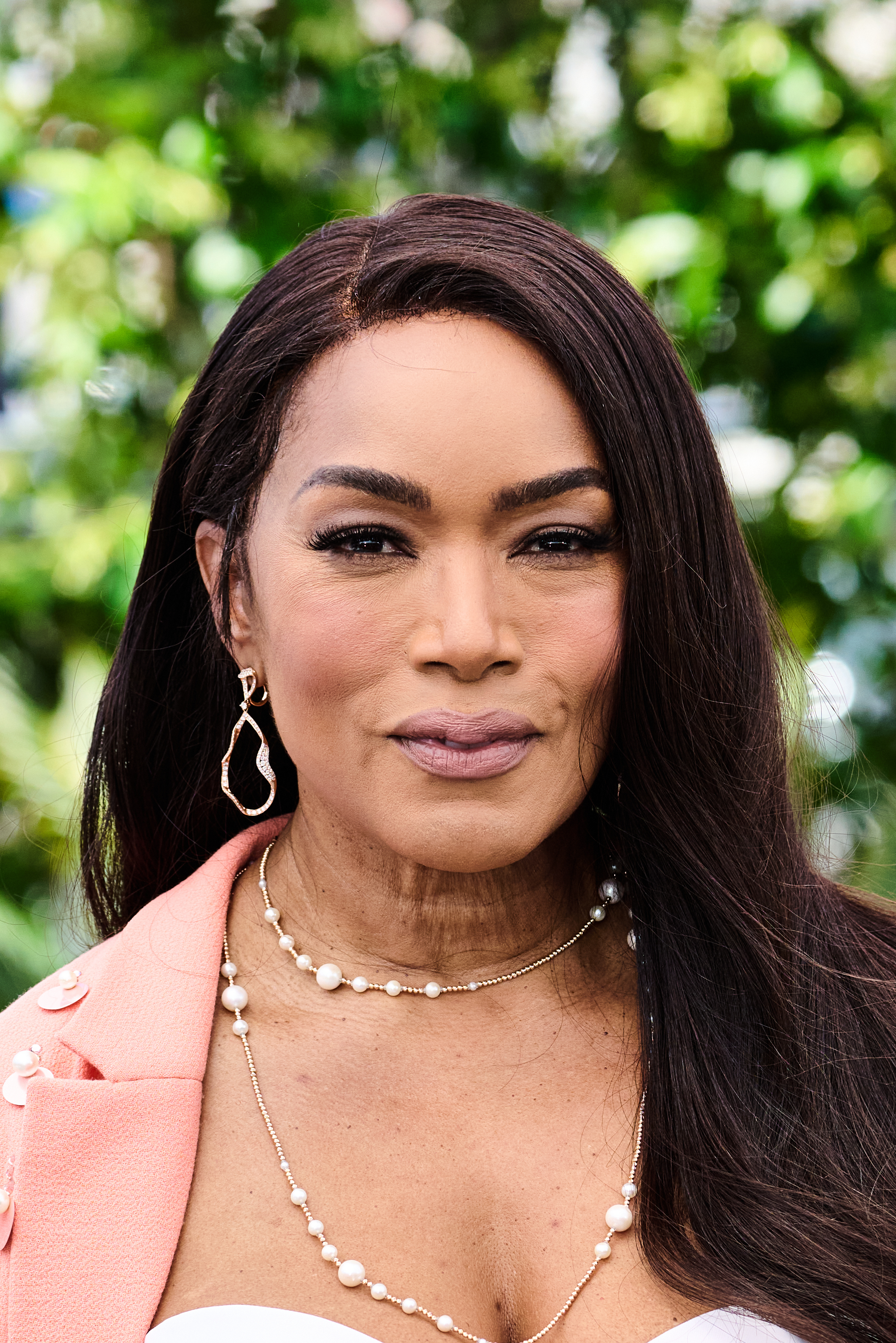
- Bassett at the 2025 Cannes Film Festival
Awards and nominations
Award	Wins	Nominations
Academy Awards	1	3
Actor Awards	1	4
British Academy Film Awards	0	1
Directors Guild of America Awards	0	1
Daytime Emmy Awards	0	2
Golden Globe Awards	2	2
NAACP Image Awards	17	37
Primetime Emmy Awards	1	9

Totals (Note: Certain award groups do not simply award one winner. They acknowledge several different recipients, have runners-up, and have third place. Since this is a specific recognition and is different from losing an award, runner-up mentions are considered wins in this award tally. For simplification and to avoid errors, each award in this list has been presumed to have had a prior nomination.)
- Wins: 55
- Nominations: 157

Angela Bassett is an American actress, director and producer. She has been the recipient of numerous accolades including an Academy Honorary Award, a Primetime Emmy Award, an Actor Award and two Golden Globe Awards.

After debuting in 1980s, she earned recognition for films such as Boyz n the Hood (1991) and Malcolm X (1992). She had her breakthrough portraying singer Tina Turner in the biopic What's Love Got to Do with It (1993), for which she won the Golden Globe Award for Best Actress in a Motion Picture – Musical or Comedy and received a nomination for the Academy Award for Best Actress. She also earned recognition for playing Queen Ramonda in the Marvel Cinematic Universe films. For Black Panther (2018), she won the shared Screen Actors Guild Award for Outstanding Performance by a Cast in a Motion Picture. For Black Panther: Wakanda Forever (2022), she was nominated for the Academy Award for Best Supporting Actress, becoming the first person nominated for an acting Academy Award for the Marvel film. For the role, she won the Golden Globe Award for Best Supporting Actress – Motion Picture and the Critics' Choice Movie Award for Best Supporting Actress, as well as received nominations for the BAFTA Award for Best Actress in a Supporting Role and the Screen Actors Guild Award for Outstanding Performance by a Female Actor in a Supporting Role. In 2024, she won the Primetime Emmy Award for Outstanding Narrator for the documentary television series Queens. Apart from acting, she received critical acclaim for directing the biographical film Whitney (2015), for which she was nominated for the Directors Guild of America Award for Outstanding Directorial Achievement in Movies for Television and Limited Series.

She has also won a BET Award, five Black Reel Awards and sixteen NAACP Image Awards. She has received several honorary degrees. In 2008, she received a star on the Hollywood Walk of Fame. In 2024, she was inducted to the Disney Legends hall of fame.

Key
†	Indicates non-competitive categories

== Major associations ==
=== Academy Awards ===
Year	Category	Work	Result	Ref.
1994	Best Actress	What's Love Got to Do with It	Nominated	
2023	Best Supporting Actress	Black Panther: Wakanda Forever	Nominated	
Governors Awards
2024	Academy Honorary Award †	—N/a	Honored	

=== Actor Awards ===
Year	Category	Work	Result	Ref.
2002	Outstanding Female Actor in a Miniseries or Television Movie	Ruby's Bucket of Blood	Nominated	
2014	Outstanding Female Actor in a Miniseries or Television Movie	Betty & Coretta	Nominated	
2019	Outstanding Cast in a Motion Picture	Black Panther	Won (Note: Shared with the cast.)	
2023	Outstanding Female Actor in a Supporting Role	Black Panther: Wakanda Forever	Nominated	

=== BAFTA Awards ===
Year	Category	Work	Result	Ref.
British Academy Film Awards
2023	Best Actress in a Supporting Role	Black Panther: Wakanda Forever	Nominated	

=== Critics' Choice Awards ===
Year	Category	Work	Result	Ref.
Critics' Choice Movie Awards
2023	Best Supporting Actress	Black Panther: Wakanda Forever	Won	
Critics' Choice Television Awards
2013	Best Actress in a Movie/Miniseries	Betty & Coretta	Nominated	
Critics' Choice Super Awards
2021	Best Actress in an Action Series	9-1-1	Won	
2022	Best Actress in an Action Series	9-1-1	Nominated	
2023	Best Actress in a Superhero Movie	Black Panther: Wakanda Forever	Won	
2023	Best Actress in an Action Series	9-1-1	Nominated	
2024	Best Actress in an Action Series	9-1-1	Nominated	
2025	Best Actress in an Action Series	9-1-1	Nominated	
2026	Best Actress in an Action Series	9-1-1	Nominated	
Critics' Choice Documentary Awards
2022	Best Narration	Good Night Oppy	Won	
2024	Best Narration	Queens	Nominated	

=== Directors Guild of America Awards ===
Year	Category	Work	Result	Ref.
2016	Outstanding Directorial Achievement in Movies for Television and Mini-Series	Whitney	Nominated	

=== Emmy Awards ===
Year	Category	Work	Result	Ref.
Daytime Emmy Awards
1996	Outstanding Performer in Children's Programming	Storytime	Nominated	
2003	Outstanding Children's Special	Our America	Nominated	
Primetime Emmy Awards
2002	Outstanding Lead Actress in a Miniseries or Movie	The Rosa Parks Story	Nominated	
2014	Outstanding Supporting Actress in a Miniseries or Movie	American Horror Story: Coven	Nominated	
2015	Outstanding Supporting Actress in a Limited Series or Movie	American Horror Story: Freak Show	Nominated	
2017	Outstanding Guest Actress in a Comedy Series	Master of None (episode: "Thanksgiving")	Nominated	
2019	Outstanding Narrator	The Flood (episode: "First Pulse")	Nominated	
2020	Outstanding Guest Actress in a Comedy Series	A Black Lady Sketch Show (episode: "Angela Bassett Is the Baddest Bitch")	Nominated	
2020	Outstanding Narrator	The Imagineering Story (episode: "The Happiest Place on Earth")	Nominated	
2023	Outstanding Narrator	Good Night Oppy	Nominated	
2024	Outstanding Narrator	Queens (episode: "African Queens")	Won	

=== Golden Globe Awards ===
Year	Category	Work	Result	Ref.
1994	Best Actress in a Motion Picture – Musical or Comedy	What's Love Got to Do with It	Won	
2023	Best Supporting Actress – Motion Picture	Black Panther: Wakanda Forever	Won	

== Miscellaneous awards ==
Awards and nominations received by Jessica Lange
Award	Year (Note: The listed year refers to the date of the ceremony.)	Category	Work	Result	Ref.
AARP Movies for Grownups Awards	2019	Best Supporting Actress	Black Panther	Nominated	
AARP Movies for Grownups Awards	2023	Best Supporting Actress	Black Panther: Wakanda Forever	Nominated	
African-American Film Critics Association	2019	Best Female Performance	9-1-1	Won	
African-American Film Critics Association	2023	Best Supporting Actress	Black Panther: Wakanda Forever	Won	
Alliance of Women Film Journalists	2023	Best Supporting Actress	Black Panther: Wakanda Forever	Nominated	
American Black Film Festival (Note: Previously called Acalpulco Black Film Festival.)	1999	Best Actress	How Stella Got Her Groove Back	Won	
American Black Film Festival	2026	Excellence in the Arts Award †	—N/a	Won	
Astra Film Awards (Note: At the time called Hollywood Critics Association Film Awards.)	2023	Best Supporting Actress	Black Panther: Wakanda Forever	Won	
Astra Film Awards	2023	Acting Achievement Award †	—N/a	Won	
Astra TV Awards	2024 (Note: First ceremony in 2024.)	Best Actress in a Broadcast Network or Cable Drama Series	9-1-1	Nominated	
Astra TV Awards	2024 (Note: Second ceremony in 2024.)	Best Actress in a Broadcast Network or Cable Drama Series	9-1-1	Nominated	
Astra TV Awards	2025	Best Actress in a Drama Series	9-1-1	Nominated	
Astra TV Awards	2025	Best Guest Actress in a Drama Series	Doctor Odyssey	Nominated	
Astra TV Awards	2026	Best Actress in a Drama Series	9-1-1	Nominated	
Astra TV Awards	2026	Best Broadcast Network Drama Ensemble	9-1-1	Won	
BET Awards	2001	Best Actress	—N/a	Nominated	
BET Awards	2002	Best Actress	—N/a	Nominated	
BET Awards	2007	Best Actress	—N/a	Nominated	
BET Awards	2008	Best Actress	—N/a	Nominated	
BET Awards	2009	Best Actress	—N/a	Nominated	
BET Awards	2012	Best Actress	—N/a	Nominated	
BET Awards	2013	Best Actress	—N/a	Nominated	
BET Awards	2014	Best Actress	—N/a	Nominated	
BET Awards	2018	Best Actress	—N/a	Nominated	
BET Awards	2020	Best Actress	—N/a	Nominated	
BET Awards	2021	Best Actress	—N/a	Nominated	
BET Awards	2023	Best Actress	—N/a	Won	
BET Awards	2024	Best Actress	—N/a	Nominated	
BET Awards	2025	Best Actress	—N/a	Nominated	
BET Awards	2026	Best Actress	—N/a	Nominated	
Black Film Critics Circle	2022	Best Supporting Actress	Black Panther: Wakanda Forever	Won	
Black Girls Rock!	2019	Icon Award †	—N/a	Won	
Black Movie Awards	2006	Outstanding Performance by an Actress	Akeelah and the Bee	Won	
Black Reel Awards	2000	Outstanding Supporting Actress	Music of the Heart	Nominated	
Black Reel Awards	2001	Outstanding Actress	Boesman and Lena	Nominated	
Black Reel Awards	2003	Outstanding Actress	Sunshine State	Won	
Black Reel Awards	2005	Outstanding Actress – Comedy or Musical	Mr. 3000	Nominated	
Black Reel Awards	2007	Outstanding Supporting Actress	Akeelah and the Bee	Nominated	
Black Reel Awards	2012	Outstanding Supporting Actress	Jumping the Broom	Nominated	
Black Reel Awards	2016	Outstanding Supporting Actress	Chi-Raq	Nominated	
Black Reel Awards	2021	Outstanding Voice Performance	Soul	Nominated	
Black Reel Awards	2023	Outstanding Supporting Actress	Black Panther: Wakanda Forever	Won	
Black Reel Awards	2023	Sidney Poitier Trailblazer Award †	—N/a	Won	
Black Reel Awards for Television	2002	Outstanding Actress – TV Movie or Limited Series	Ruby's Bucket of Blood	Won	
Black Reel Awards for Television	2003	Outstanding Actress – TV Movie or Limited Series	The Rosa Parks Story	Won	
Black Reel Awards for Television	2014	Outstanding Actress – TV Movie or Limited Series	Betty & Coretta	Nominated	
Black Reel Awards for Television	2016	Outstanding Supporting Actress – TV Movie or Limited Series	American Horror Story: Hotel	Nominated	
Black Reel Awards for Television	2016	Outstanding Director – TV Movie or Limited Series	Whitney	Nominated	
Black Reel Awards for Television	2017	Outstanding Supporting Actress – TV Movie or Limited Series	American Horror Story: Roanoke	Nominated	
Black Reel Awards for Television	2017	Outstanding Director – TV Movie or Limited Series	American Horror Story: Roanoke (episode: "Chapter 6")	Nominated	
Black Reel Awards for Television	2017	Outstanding Guest Performer – Comedy Series	Master of None	Nominated	
Black Reel Awards for Television	2018	Outstanding Director – TV Movie or Limited Series	American Horror Story: Cult (episode: "Drink the Kool-Aid")	Nominated	
Black Reel Awards for Television	2019	Outstanding Actress – Drama Series	9-1-1	Nominated	
Black Reel Awards for Television	2020	Outstanding Guest Actress – Comedy Series	A Black Lady Sketch Show	Nominated	
Black Reel Awards for Television	2024	Outstanding Lead Performance – Drama Series	9-1-1	Nominated	
Black Reel Awards for Television	2026	Outstanding Lead Performance – Drama Series	9-1-1	Nominated	
Capri Hollywood International Film Festival	2022	Best Supporting Actress	Black Panther: Wakanda Forever	Won	
Celebration of Cinema and Television (Note: At the time called Celebration of Black Cinema and Television.)	2022	Career Achievement Award †	—N/a	Won	
Costume Designers Guild Awards	2023	Spotlight Award †	—N/a	Won	
Dallas–Fort Worth Film Critics Association	2022	Best Supporting Actress	Black Panther: Wakanda Forever	3rd place	
Denver Film Critics Society	2023	Best Supporting Actress	Black Panther: Wakanda Forever	Nominated	
DOC LA	2017	DOC LA Icon Award	Remand	Won	
Dorian Awards	2023	Supporting Film Performance of the Year	Black Panther: Wakanda Forever	Nominated	
Dorian Awards	2024	Galeca TV Icon Award	—N/a	Nominated	
Dorian Awards	2025	Galeca TV Icon Award	—N/a	Nominated	
Drama League Awards	2012	Distinguished Performance	The Mountaintop	Nominated	
Georgia Film Critics Association	2022	Best Supporting Actress	Black Panther: Wakanda Forever	Nominated	
Golden Apple Awards	1993	Female Discovery of the Year	—N/a	Won	
Golden Joystick Awards	2022	Best Performer	Horizon Forbidden West	Nominated	
Gracie Awards	2016	Director – Lifestyle	Breakthrough	Won	
Harvard Foundation for Intercultural and Race Relations	2024	Artists of the Year †	—N/a	Won (Note: Shared with Courtney B. Vance.)	
High Falls Film Festival	2005	Susan B. Anthony "Failure is Impossible" Award †	—N/a	Won	
IDA Documentary Awards	2024	Best Episodic Series	Queens	Nominated	
LA Femme Film Festival	2010	Pioneer Award †	—N/a	Won	
MTV Movie & TV Awards (Note: At the time called MTV Movie Awards.)	1994	Best Female Performance	What's Love Got to Do with It	Nominated	
NAACP Image Awards	1994	Outstanding Actress in a Motion Picture	What's Love Got to Do with It	Won	
NAACP Image Awards	1994	Outstanding Supporting Actress in a Motion Picture	Malcolm X	Won	
NAACP Image Awards	1996	Outstanding Actress in a Motion Picture	Waiting to Exhale	Won	
NAACP Image Awards	1998	Outstanding Supporting Actress in a Motion Picture	Contact	Nominated	
NAACP Image Awards	1999	Outstanding Actress in a Motion Picture	How Stella Got Her Groove Back	Won	
NAACP Image Awards	2000	Outstanding Supporting Actress in a Motion Picture	Music of the Heart	Won	
NAACP Image Awards	2001	Outstanding Actress in a Motion Picture	Boesman and Lena	Nominated	
NAACP Image Awards	2002	Outstanding Supporting Actress in a Motion Picture	The Score	Won	
NAACP Image Awards	2002	Outstanding Actress in a Television Movie, Mini-Series or Dramatic Special	Ruby's Bucket of Blood	Won	
NAACP Image Awards	2003	Outstanding Actress in a Motion Picture	Sunshine State	Won	
NAACP Image Awards	2003	Outstanding Actress in a Television Movie, Mini-Series or Dramatic Special	The Rosa Parks Story	Won	
NAACP Image Awards	2005	Outstanding Actress in a Motion Picture	Mr. 3000	Nominated	
NAACP Image Awards	2007	Outstanding Supporting Actress in a Motion Picture	Akeelah and the Bee	Nominated	
NAACP Image Awards	2009	Outstanding Actress in a Motion Picture	Meet the Browns	Nominated	
NAACP Image Awards	2009	Outstanding Supporting Actress in a Drama Series	ER	Won	
NAACP Image Awards	2014	Outstanding Actress in a Motion Picture	Black Nativity	Won	
NAACP Image Awards	2014	Outstanding Actress in a Television Movie, Mini-Series or Dramatic Special	American Horror Story: Coven	Nominated	
NAACP Image Awards	2014	Outstanding Actress in a Television Movie, Mini-Series or Dramatic Special	Betty & Coretta	Nominated	
NAACP Image Awards	2015	Outstanding Actress in a Television Movie, Mini-Series or Dramatic Special	American Horror Story: Freak Show	Nominated	
NAACP Image Awards	2016	Outstanding Supporting Actress in a Motion Picture	Chi-Raq	Nominated	
NAACP Image Awards	2016	Outstanding Actress in a Television Movie, Mini-Series or Dramatic Special	American Horror Story: Hotel	Nominated	
NAACP Image Awards	2017	Outstanding Actress in a Motion Picture	London Has Fallen	Nominated	
NAACP Image Awards	2020	Entertainer of the Year	—N/a	Nominated	
NAACP Image Awards	2020	Outstanding Actress in a Drama Series	9-1-1	Won	
NAACP Image Awards	2021	Outstanding Character Voice Performance – Motion Picture	Soul	Nominated	
NAACP Image Awards	2021	Outstanding Actress in a Drama Series	9-1-1	Nominated	
NAACP Image Awards	2022	Outstanding Actress in a Drama Series	9-1-1	Won	
NAACP Image Awards	2022	Outstanding Character Voice-Over Performance – Television	Malika: The Lion Queen	Nominated	
NAACP Image Awards	2023	Entertainer of the Year	—N/a	Won	
NAACP Image Awards	2023	Outstanding Supporting Actress in a Motion Picture	Black Panther: Wakanda Forever	Won	
NAACP Image Awards	2023	Outstanding Character Voice Performance – Motion Picture	Wendell & Wild	Nominated	
NAACP Image Awards	2023	Outstanding Actress in a Drama Series	9-1-1	Won	
NAACP Image Awards	2024	Outstanding Actress in a Drama Series	9-1-1	Nominated	
NAACP Image Awards	2025	Outstanding Actress in a Drama Series	9-1-1	Nominated	
NAACP Image Awards	2025	Outstanding Character Voice-Over Performance – Television	Orion and the Dark	Nominated	
NAACP Image Awards	2026	Outstanding Actress in a Drama Series	9-1-1	Won	
NAACP Image Awards	2026	Outstanding Supporting Actress in a Limited Television (Series, Special, Movie)	Zero Day	Nominated	
New York Women in Film & Television	1995	Muse Award †	—N/a	Won	
North Carolina Film Critics Association	2022	Best Supporting Actress	Black Panther: Wakanda Forever	Nominated	
People's Choice Awards	2021	The Female TV Star of 2021	9-1-1	Nominated	
People's Choice Awards	2021	The Drama TV Star of 2021	9-1-1	Nominated	
San Francisco Bay Area Film Critics Circle	2023	Best Supporting Actress	Black Panther: Wakanda Forever	Nominated	
Santa Barbara International Film Festival	2023	Montecito Award †	—N/a	Won	
Satellite Awards	2003	Best Actress in a Supporting Role	Black Panther: Wakanda Forever	Nominated	
Saturn Awards	1996	Best Actress	Strange Days	Won	
Saturn Awards	2024	Best Supporting Actress	Black Panther: Wakanda Forever	Nominated	
Seattle Film Critics Society	2023	Best Supporting Actress	Black Panther: Wakanda Forever	Nominated	
Shorty Awards	2020	Actor	—N/a	Nominated	
St. Louis Film Critics Association	2022	Best Supporting Actress	Black Panther: Wakanda Forever	Nominated	
Washington D.C. Area Film Critics Association	2022	Best Supporting Actress	Black Panther: Wakanda Forever	Nominated	
Women in Film Honors	1996	Crystal Award †	—N/a	Won	
Women's Image Network Awards	2013	Actress Made for Television Movie / Mini-Series	Betty & Coretta	Won	
Women's Image Network Awards	2015	Film Directed by a Woman	Whitney	Nominated	

== Honors ==
=== Honorary degrees ===
University	Degree	Year	Ref.
AFI Conservatory	Doctor of Fine Arts	2021	
Howard University	Doctor of Humane Letters	2000	
Old Dominion University	Doctor of Humane Letters	2022	
Yale University	Doctor of Fine Arts	2018	

=== Miscellaneous honors ===
Organization	Year	Ref.
Disney Legends	2024	
Hollywood Walk of Fame	2008	

== See also ==
- Angela Bassett filmography
- List of actors with more than one Academy Award nomination in the acting categories
- List of actors with Academy Award nominations
