= Angela Bassett filmography =

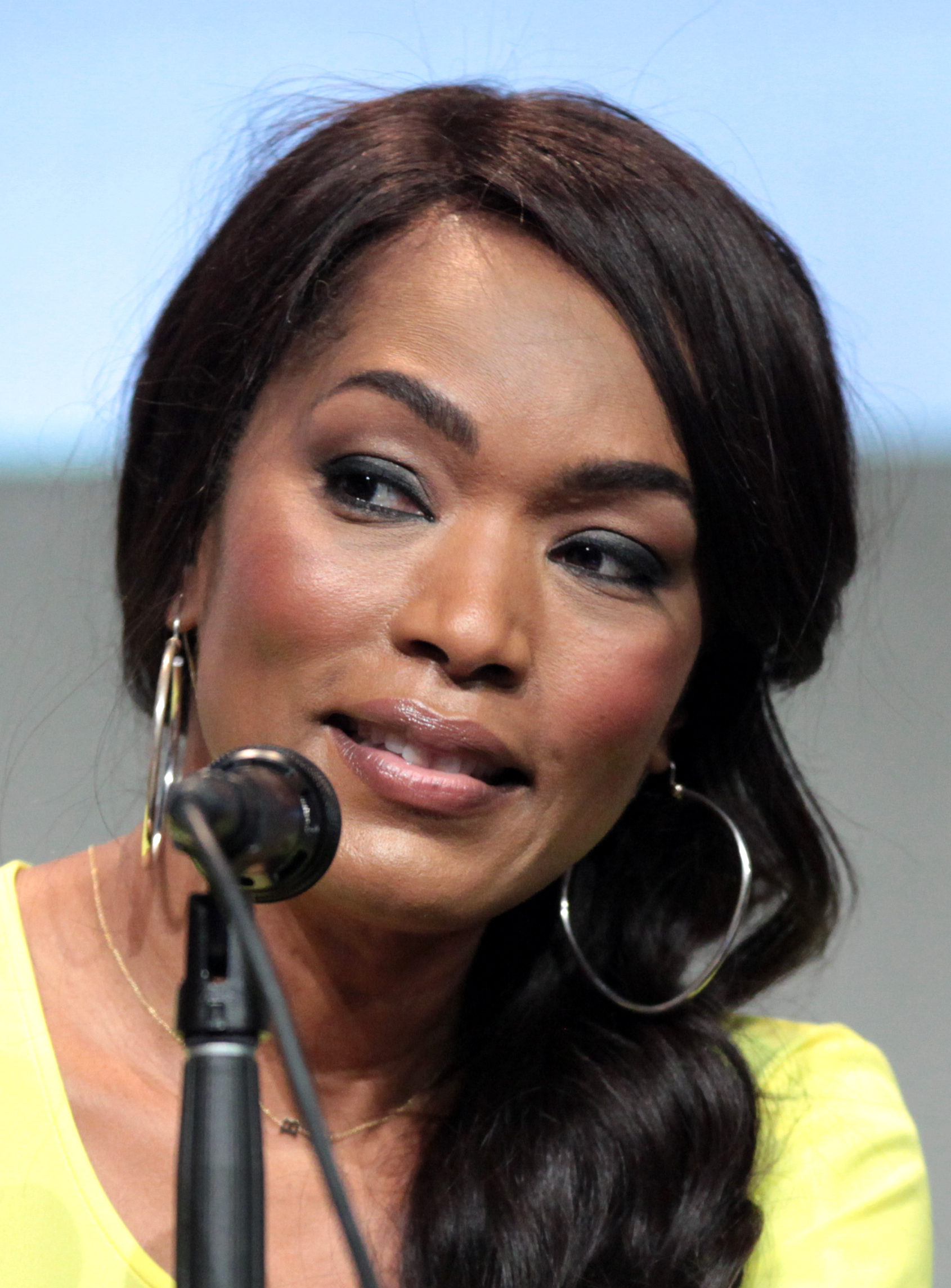
Bassett in 2015

American actress Angela Bassett has worked in film and television since the late 1980s.

== Actress ==
=== Film ===
Key
†	Denotes films that have not yet been released

Year	Title	Role	Notes
1986	F/X	TV Reporter	
1990	Kindergarten Cop	Stewardess	
1991	Boyz n the Hood	Reva Styles	
1991	City of Hope	Reesha	
1992	Innocent Blood	U.S. Attorney Barbara Sinclair	
1992	Critters 4	Fran	
1992	Malcolm X	Betty Shabazz	
1992	Passion Fish	Dawn / Rhonda	
1993	What's Love Got to Do with It	Anna Mae Bullock / Tina Turner	
1995	Panther	Betty Shabazz	
1995	Strange Days	Lornette 'Mace' Mason	
1995	Vampire in Brooklyn	Detective Rita Veder	
1995	Waiting to Exhale	Bernadine 'Bernie' Harris	
1997	Contact	Rachel Constantine	
1998	How Stella Got Her Groove Back	Stella Payne	
1999	Our Friend, Martin	Mrs. Woodman (voice)	Direct-to-video
1999	Music of the Heart	Principal Janet Williams	
2000	Supernova	Dr. Kaela Evers	
2000	Whispers: An Elephant's Tale	Groove (voice)	
2000	Boesman and Lena	Lena	
2001	The Score	Diane	
2002	Sunshine State	Desiree Stokes Perry	
2003	Unchained Memories	Reader (for Elizabeth Sparks' and Mary Reynolds' narratives)	
2003	Masked and Anonymous	Mistress	
2004	The Lazarus Child	Dr. Elizabeth Chase	
2004	Mr. 3000	Maureen 'Mo' Simmons	
2005	Mr. & Mrs. Smith	Atlanta (voice)	Uncredited
2006	Akeelah and the Bee	Tanya Anderson	
2007	Meet the Robinsons	Mildred (voice)	
2008	Gospel Hill	Sarah Malcolm	
2008	Of Boys and Men	Rieta Cole	
2008	Meet the Browns	Brenda Brown	
2008	Nothing But the Truth	Bonnie Benjamin	
2009	Notorious	Voletta Wallace	
2011	Jumping the Broom	Claudine Watson	
2011	Green Lantern	Amanda Waller	
2012	This Means War	Collins	
2012	I Ain't Scared of You	Herself	
2013	Olympus Has Fallen	Secret Service Director Lynne Jacobs	
2013	Black Nativity	Aretha Cobbs	
2014	White Bird in a Blizzard	Dr. Thaler	
2015	Curious George 3: Back to the Jungle	Dr. Kulinda (voice)	Direct-to-video
2015	Survivor	Ambassador Maureen Crane	
2015	Chi-Raq	Miss Helen	
2016	London Has Fallen	Secret Service Director Lynne Jacobs	
2018	Black Panther	Ramonda	
2018	Mission: Impossible – Fallout	CIA Director Erika Sloane	
2018	Bumblebee	Shatter (voice)	
2019	Avengers: Endgame	Ramonda	Cameo
2019	Otherhood	Carol Walker	
2020	Soul	Dorothea Williams (voice)	
2021	Tina	Herself	Documentary
2021	Gunpowder Milkshake	Anna May	
2022	Wendell & Wild	Sister Helley (voice)	
2022	Black Panther: Wakanda Forever	Ramonda	
2024	Orion and the Dark	Sweet Dreams (voice)	
2024	Damsel	Lady Bayford	
2025	Mission: Impossible – The Final Reckoning	US President Erika Sloane	
2026	Wildwood	The General (voice)	

=== Television ===
Year	Title	Role	Notes
1985	Search for Tomorrow	Selina McCulla	Recurring role; 5 episodes
1985	Spenser: For Hire	Alice	Episode: "The Choice"
1985	Doubletake	Prostitute at HQ	Television film
1985, 1988	The Cosby Show	Mrs. Mitchell / Sari	Episodes: "Mr. Quiet" / "Bookworm"
1986	Liberty	Linda Thornton	Television film
1986	My Man Bovanne	Elo	Educational film
1987	Ryan's Hope	Leonie Peach	
1987	Guiding Light	Angela	Recurring
1987	Leg Work	Dr. Griffin	Episode: "Things That Go Bump in the Night"
1989	HeartBeat	Jeanette Calder R.N.	Episode: "Gestalt and Battery"
1989	A Man Called Hawk	Bailey Webster	Episodes: "The Master's Mirror" and "Never My Love"
1989	Tour of Duty	Lieutenant Camilla Patterson	Episodes: "Hard Stripe" and "The Volunteer"
1989	227	Amy Burnett	Episode: "A Pampered Tale"
1989	Thirtysomething	Kate Harriton	Episode: "Legacy"
1990	Alien Nation	Renee Longstreet	Episode: "Eyewitness News"
1990	Family of Spies	Bev Andress	Episode "2"
1990	Snoops	Laura Hale	Episode: "Someone to Lay Down Beside Me"
1990	Challenger	Cheryl McNair	Television film
1990	Equal Justice	Janet Fields	Episode: "Goodbye, Judge Green"
1990	In the Best Interest of the Child	Lori	Television film
1990	Perry Mason: In the Case of the Silenced Singer	Carla Peters	Television film
1991	Line of Fire: The Morris Dees Story	Pat	Television film
1991	The Flash	Linda Lake	Episode: "Beat the Clock"
1991	Fire: Trapped on the 37th Floor	Allison	Television film
1991	Stat	Dr. Willie Burns	Episode: "Ladyfinger"
1991	The Heroes of Desert Storm	Lieutenant Phoebe Jeter	Television film
1991	Locked Up: A Mother's Rage	Willie	Television film
1991	One Special Victory	Lois	Television film
1992	Nightmare Cafe	Evelyn Wall	Episode: "Sanctuary for a Child"
1992	The Jacksons: An American Dream	Katherine Jackson	Episodes: "Part I" and "Part II"
2001	Ruby's Bucket of Blood	Ruby Delacroix	Television film
2002	The Rosa Parks Story	Rosa Parks	Television film
2003	Freedom: A History of Us	Sheyann Webb / Melba Pattillo (voice)	Episodes: "Marching to Freedom Land" and "Let Freedom Ring"; Documentary series
2003	The Bernie Mac Show	Herself	Episode: "Laughing Matters"
2005	Alias	CIA Director Hayden Chase	Episodes: "Authorized Personnel Only: Part I", "The Index", "Search and Rescue" and "The Descent"
2006	Time Bomb	Jill Greco	Television film
2008–2009	ER	Dr. Cate Banfield	Main role; 16 episodes
2010	The Simpsons	First Lady Michelle Obama (voice)	Episode: "Stealing First Base"
2011	Identity	Martha Adams	Television pilot that did not get picked up
2012	Rogue	Alice Vargas	Television pilot that did not get picked up
2013	Betty & Coretta	Coretta Scott King	Television film
2013–2014	American Horror Story: Coven	Marie Laveau	12 episodes
2014–2015	American Horror Story: Freak Show	Desiree Dupree	Main role; 11 episodes
2015–16	American Horror Story: Hotel	Ramona Royale	Main role; 7 episodes
2015–18	BoJack Horseman	Ana Spanakopita (voice)	Recurring role; 10 episodes
2016	American Horror Story: Roanoke	Lee Harris/Monet Tumusiime	Main role; 4 episodes (Harris) / 5 episodes (Tumusiime)
2016	The Snowy Day	Nana/Ms. Cora (voice)	Television special
2016	Close to the Enemy	Eva	Miniseries; 7 episodes
2017	Underground	The Root Woman	Episode: "Ache"; uncredited
2017, 2021	Master of None	Catherine	Episodes: "Thanksgiving" and "Moments in Love, Chapter 3" (voice only)
2018	American Horror Story: Apocalypse	Marie Laveau	Episode: "Apocalypse Then"
2018	The Flood	Narrator	Television film
2018–present	9-1-1	Detective Athena Grant-Nash	Lead role; also executive producer
2019	A Black Lady Sketch Show	Mo	Episode: "Angela Bassett Is the Baddest Bitch"
2019	The Imagineering Story	Narrator	Documentary series
2021	Malika the Lion Queen	Malika (voice)	Television film
2021	What If...?	Ramonda (voice)	Episode: "What If... Killmonger Rescued Tony Stark?"
2021	RuPaul's Drag Race: All Stars	Herself	Special guest; Episode: "Rumerican Horror Story: Coven Girls"
2021	Red Table Talk	Herself	Episode: "Jada's Surprise 50th Birthday Celebration"
2022	9-1-1: Lone Star	Sergeant Athena Grant-Nash	Special guest star; Episode: "Prince Albert in a Can"
2022	Good Night Oppy	Narrator	Documentary
2022	The Kelly Clarkson Show	Herself	Episode: "Angela Bassett/Kel Mitchell/Nyesha Arrington"
2024	Queens	Narrator	Episodes: "African Queens" and "Rainforest Queens"
2024	Sherri	Herself	Episode: "Angela Bassett"
2024	The Talk	Herself	Episode: "Angela Bassett/Paul Scheer"
2024	The Tonight Show Starring Jimmy Fallon	Herself	Episode: "Angela Bassett"
2024	Tamron Hall	Herself	Episode: "Angela Bassett"
2024	The Jennifer Hudson Show	Herself	Opening episode of season 3
2025	Zero Day	President Evelyn Mitchell	Miniseries; 6 episodes
2025	Moon Girl and Devil Dinosaur	Decoy (voice)	Episodes: "Full Moon" and "Shoot for the Moon"
2025	Doctor Odyssey	Athena Grant-Nash	Episode: "Casino Week"
2026	American Horror Story: 13	Marie Laveau	Main role; 3 episodes

=== Theatre ===
Year	Title	Role	Notes
1982	Beef, No Chicken	Drusilla	Yale Repertory Theatre
1982	Colored People's Time	Understudy	covered for Carol Maillard for two performances
1983	Antigone	Antigone	
1983	Fried Chicken and Invisibility	Conductor Dixon	
1984	The Mystery Plays	Eve, Noah's wife, Mary, and Gill	
1985	Ma Rainey's Black Bottom	Dussie Mae	Broadway
1986	Black Girl	Ruth Ann	
1987	Pericles	Thaisa	
1987	Henry IV Part 1	Lady Percy	
1988	Joe Turner's Come and Gone	Martha Pentecost	Broadway
1998	Macbeth	Lady Macbeth	
2005	His Girl Friday	Hildy Johnson	
2006	Fences	Rose Maxson	
2011–12	The Mountaintop	Camae	Broadway

=== Video games ===
Year	Title	Role	Notes
2015	Tom Clancy's Rainbow Six Siege	Aurelia Arnot / Six	Voice and motion capture
2022	Horizon Forbidden West	Regalla	Voice and motion capture

== Director ==
Year	Title	Notes
2015	Whitney	Television film
2015	Breakthrough	Television documentary series; episode: "Water Apocalypse"
2016	American Horror Story: Roanoke	Television series; episode: "Chapter 6"
2017	American Horror Story: Cult	Television series; episode: "Drink the Kool-Aid"

== Producer ==
Year	Title	Notes
2001	Ruby's Bucket of Blood	Television film; producer
2002	Our America	Television movie; executive producer
2002	The Rosa Parks Story	Television movie; executive producer
2017	Remand	Documentary; executive producer
2018–present	9-1-1	Television series; executive producer
2019	Otherhood	Movie; executive producer
2020–2025	9-1-1: Lone Star	Television series; executive producer
2021	For Armetta	Short; executive producer
2023	Heist 88	Television Movie; executive producer
2024	Queens	Limited Documentary Series; executive producer
2025	Number One on the Call Sheet	Documentary; executive producer
2025–present	9-1-1: Nashville	Television Series; executive producer
TBA	Keats	Television Series; executive producer

== See also ==
- List of awards and nominations received by Angela Bassett
