= African American Heritage Trail of St. Petersburg, Florida =

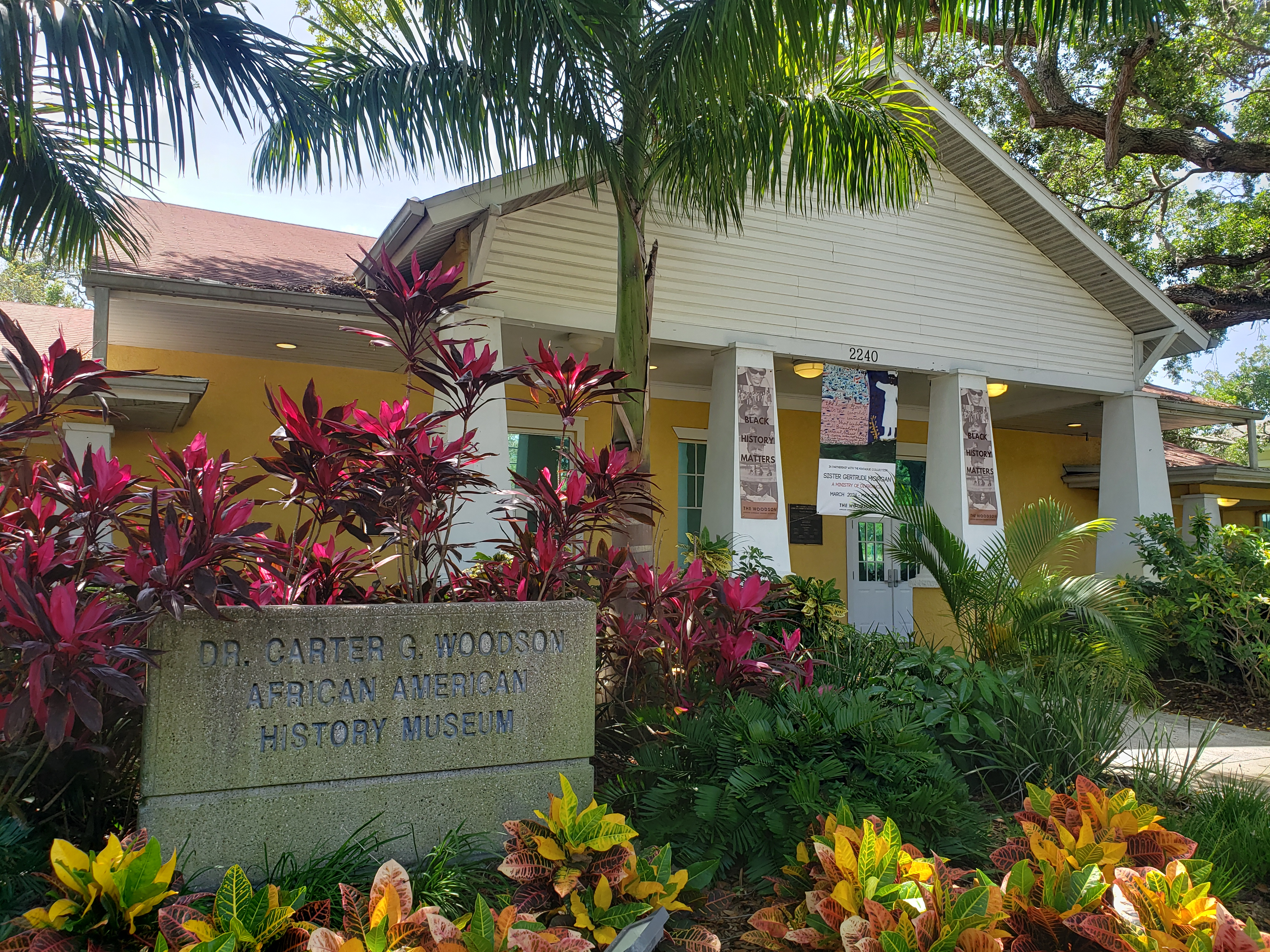
Dr. Carter G. Woodson Museum, the starting point for the African American Heritage Trail

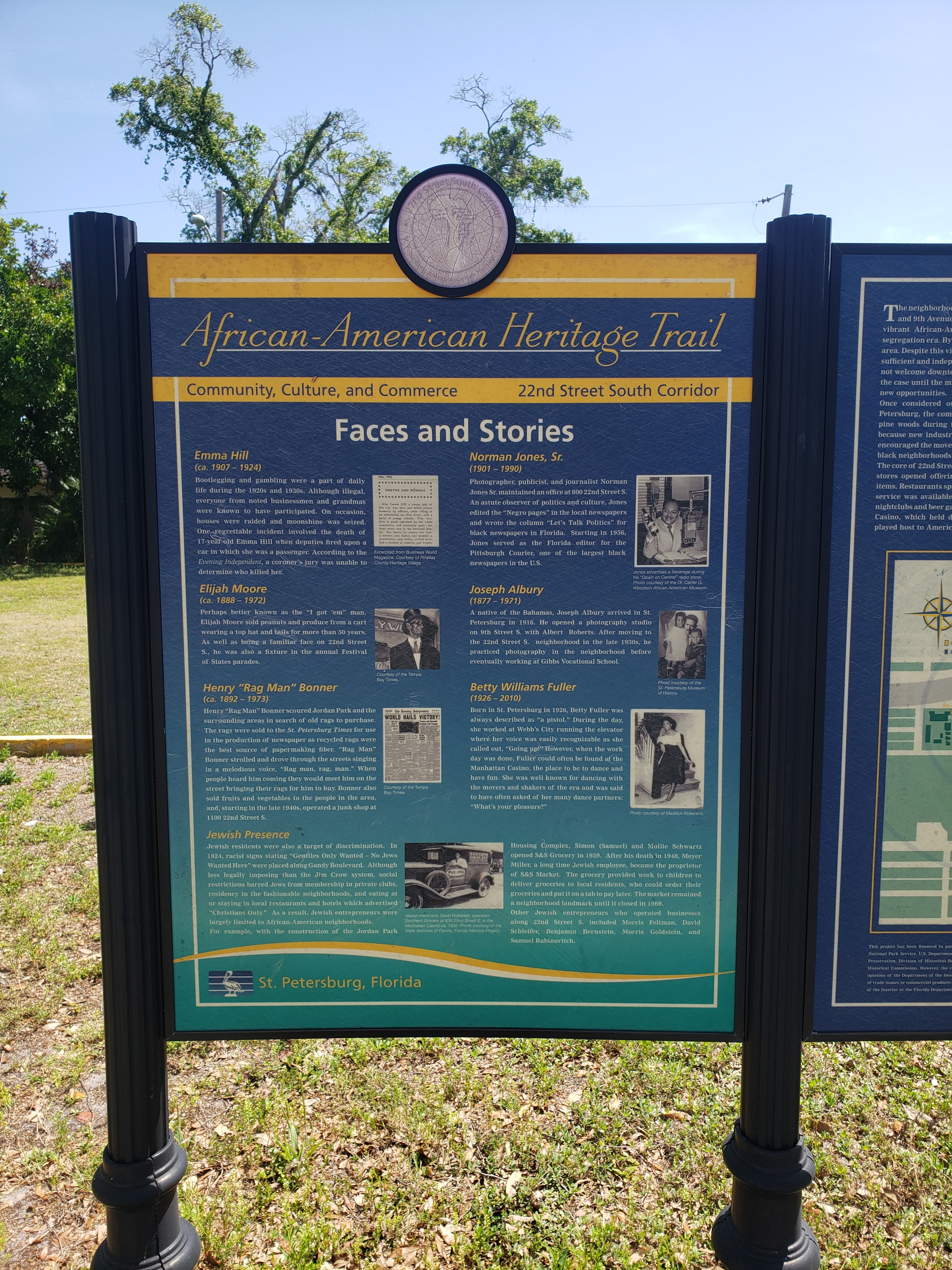
Marker from the African American Heritage Trail

The African American Heritage Trail is a self-guided walking tour created by the African American Heritage Association, a St. Petersburg, Florida non-profit organization "dedicated to preserving and teaching the rich history of black St. Petersburg." The trail is divided into two trails: one which runs along 22nd Street S and one along 9th Ave S. Both trails start at the Dr. Carter G. Woodson African American Museum.

== History ==
The Deuces, as 22nd Street South came to be known, used to be the commercial hub for the African American community in St. Petersburg during the Jim Crow era. The area was negatively impacted by projects such as interstate I-175 but it is experiencing a period of revival and investment. Deuces Live is a 501(c)3 non-profit “created to revive and revitalize this historic neighborhood where Duke Ellington and Billie Holiday played, famous African-American baseball stars stayed and the black residents of St. Petersburg lived, worked and worshiped.” The City of St. Petersburg has also invested in the neighborhood with its Deuces Rising Project, which envisions a “welcoming gateway, housing that is affordable, new parks, and an infusion of resources that encourage private businesses to thrive.”

== Sites ==
The trail along 22nd Street South focuses on "Community, Culture, and Commerce," while the trail along 9th Ave South focuses on "Faith, Family, and Education." The sites along the trail include:

- Manhattan Casino
- Fannye Ayer Ponder House
- the Royal Theater
- historic Mercy Hospital
- statue of Elder Jordan

== Gallery ==
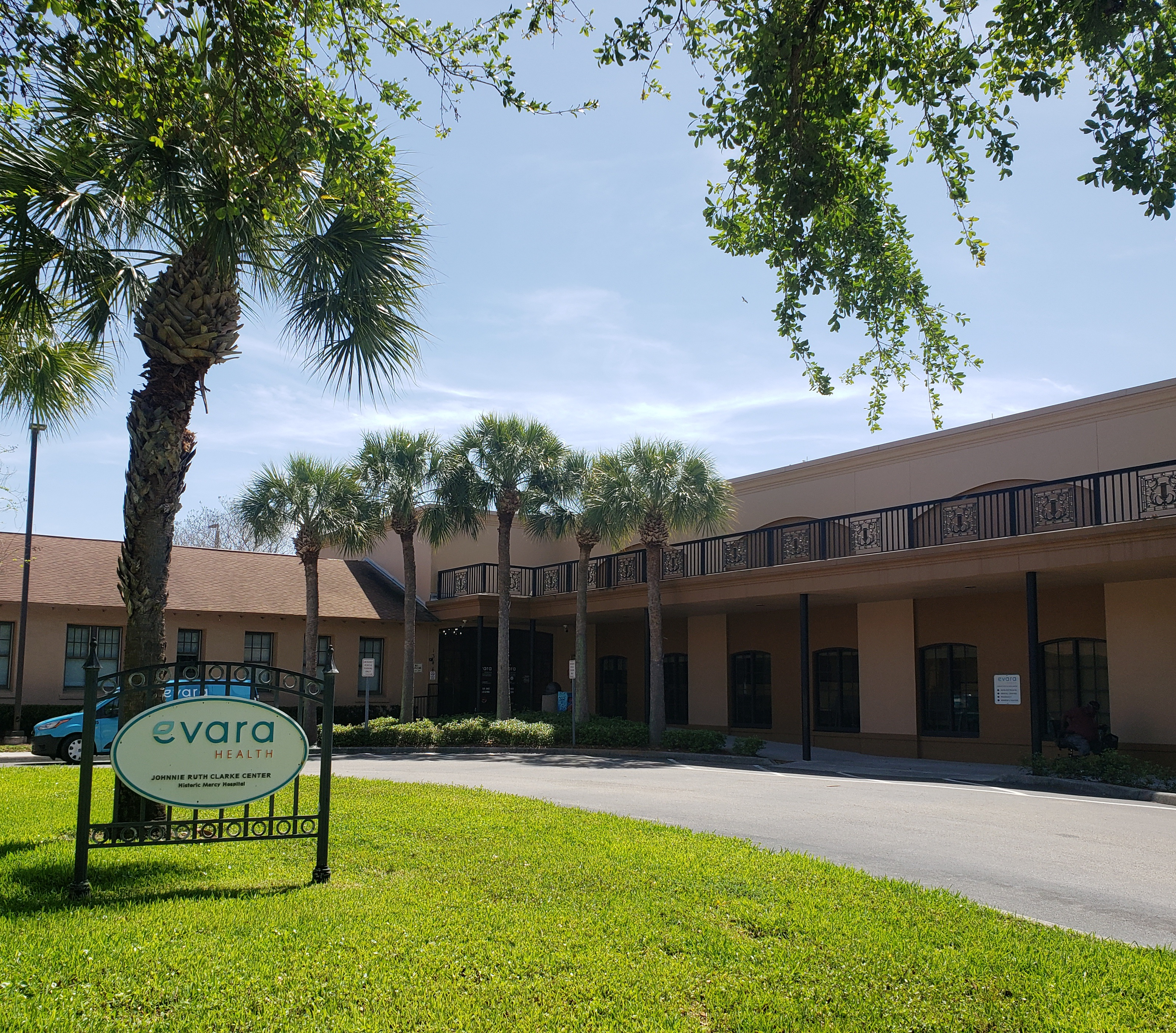
Evara Health at the former historic Mercy Hospital, once the only hospital that treated African Americans in St. Petersburg.
