= Raymond Parks =

Raymond Parks may refer to:

- Raymond Parks (activist) (1903–1977), husband of civil rights campaigner Rosa Parks
- Raymond Parks (auto racing) (1914–2010), American stock car racing team owner
