= Paris Qualles =

American screenwriter (1951– )

- Born: December 5, 1951 (age 74); Harlem, New York City, New York, U.S.
- Occupations: Television producer, screenwriter
- Years active: 1991-present

Paris Qualles (pronounced kwal'-less: born December 5, 1951) is an American screenwriter and television producer.

Qualles has written episodes for several television series, including Seaquest DSV, The Cape, M.A.N.T.I.S., Law & Order, Lois & Clark: The New Adventures of Superman, Quantum Leap, and China Beach. His television movies include A Raisin in the Sun, The Rosa Parks Story, The Color of Friendship, A House Divided, and The Tuskegee Airmen.

== Life and career ==
Qualles was born in Harlem in New York City and raised in Long Branch, New Jersey, where he graduated from Long Branch High School in 1970. He attended Rutgers College where he majored in English literature and minored in Photography. He then went to UCLA for graduate school. His primary interest was theatre direction but he turned to writing when an agent offered to represent him in that field. His first professional credit was Amen, a situation comedy starring Sherman Hemsley, where he worked as a researcher before writing scripts.

Qualles won the Humanitas Prize and the Writers Guild of America Award for The Color of Friendship and the Black Reel Award for Best Network/Cable Screenplay for The Rosa Parks Story. He was nominated for the Emmy Award for Outstanding Individual Achievement in Writing for a Miniseries or a Special for The Tuskegee Airman. In 2008, Qualles received the Humanitas Prize for his Sundance Feature Film A Raisin in the Sun.

Qualles was inducted into the Rutgers University Hall of Distinguished Alumni in 2001 and awarded an Honorary Doctorate from Rutgers College that same year. In 2004 Qualles was inducted into the Long Branch High School Distinguished Alumni Hall of Fame.
