= Peter Francis James =

American actor and voice-over artist

- Born: September 16, 1956 (age 68); Chicago, Illinois, U.S.
- Occupation(s): Actor, voice-over artist
- Years active: 1979–present

Peter Francis James (born September 16, 1956) is an American actor and voice-over artist, distinguished by his strong baritone.

== Early life ==
James was born September 16, 1956, in Chicago, Illinois, to David James and Mary Galloway James. He has five siblings.

== Career ==
=== Theater ===
James's acting career began in 1979, when he appeared in a version of Shakespeare's Coriolanus, starring Earle Hyman and Morgan Freeman.

He received his first Obie award for his portrayal of Claire in Jean Genet's The Maids. He received his second Obie award, a Drama Desk award, and the Lortel award for his portrayal of Colin Powell in Stuff Happens. He appeared as Oscar opposite Dame Maggie Smith in Edward Albee's The Lady from Dubuque at the Theatre Royal Haymarket, and reprised the role in New York, opposite Jane Alexander.

He was a featured player in Regina Taylor's play Drowning Crow, at the Manhattan Theatre Club.

James is a guest instructor at HB Studio.

From 2022 to 2023, he starred as Florenz Ziegfeld in the Broadway revival of Funny Girl.

=== Film and television ===
James played Raymond Parks, husband of Rosa Parks, in the television film The Rosa Parks Story in 2002. He had a recurring role as Judge Kevin Beck on Law & Order: Special Victims Unit; and for playing Jahfree Neema in the HBO television series Oz. James has appeared in television series such as Gossip Girl, Law & Order: Criminal Intent (as Mr. Richmond), Law & Order, and Third Watch. In 2003, he took on the role of Clayton Boudreau on the daytime soap opera Guiding Light, a role he played until early 2004. In 2006, he returned for a single episode. In 2009, James returned to Guiding Light on a recurring basis.

His film roles include Double Platinum, Long Day's Journey into Night (1982). In 1990, he was in a television film of Hamlet, directed by Kevin Kline. He portrayed Thurgood Marshall in American Experience episode of "Simple Justice" (1993), and he played Isaac Coles in the miniseries The Wedding (1998).

=== Voice roles ===
He played the voice of Dr. J.S. Steinman in the video game BioShock, a game by Ken Levine. He has played in many minor role in films, such as appearing in movies like Joe Gould's Secret (2000) and Montana (1998).

He was the reader for the Recorded Books edition of Richard Wright's Native Son. The following biographical material appears on the 2000 audiobook of Mr. James's recording of Walter Mosley's Walking the Dog.

== Personal life ==
James taught Shakespeare at the Yale School of Drama from 2000-2020.

He was married to Jillian Nelson from 1995 to 2003.

== Filmography ==
=== Film ===
Year	Title	Role	Notes
1991	The Cabinet of Dr. Ramirez	Janitor	
1998	Montana	Lawrence	
2000	Joe Gould's Secret	Man at Party	
2009	The Messenger	Dr. Grosso	
2009	The Rebound	Doctor	
2010	The Losers	Fadhil	
2011	Smoking/Non-Smoking	Marc Forrest	
2014	Song One	Neurosurgeon	
2017	Rough Night	Uncle Jack	

=== Television ===
Year	Title	Role	Notes
1981	The Edge of Night	Marcus	3 episodes
1982	Long Day's Journey Into Night	Edmund Tyrone	TV film
1989–1991	As the World Turns	Blake Stevens	2 episodes
1993	American Experience	Thurgood Marshall	Episode: "Simple Justice"
1998	The Wedding	Isaac Coles	TV film
1998	Ruby Bridges	Dr. Broyard	TV film
1998	New York Undercover	Mr. Connel	
1999	Double Platinum	Martin Holly	TV film
2000	Law & Order: Special Victims Unit	Judge Kevin Beck	5 episodes
2000	Love Song	Alfred Livingston	TV film
2000	Third Watch	Dr. Piskell	
2002	The Rosa Parks Story	Raymond Parks	TV film
2003	Oz	Jahfree Neema	4 episodes
2003–2009	Guiding Light	Clayton Boudreau	8 episodes
2008–2010	Law & Order	Judge John Laramie	4 episodes
2010	Svetlana	Barack Obama	
2012	Royal Pains	Mackintosh	
2013	Boardwalk Empire	Oliver Crawford	Episode: "Resignation"
2014	The Mysteries of Laura	Titus Bosch	
2015	Arrow	Professor Aldus Boardman	Episode: "Legends of Yesterday"
2016	Legends of Tomorrow	Professor Aldus Boardman	Episode: "Pilot"
2018	Madam Secretary	Cyril Quist	
2019	The Bold Type	Bobby O'Neill	2 episodes
2020	Katy Keene	Mr. Cabot	5 episodes
2022	What We Do in the Shadows	Headmaster Warren	Episode: "Private School"

=== Video games ===
Year	Title	Role
2007	BioShock	Dr. J.S. Steinman
2018	Red Dead Redemption 2	Shaman
