= Rosa Parks Flat =

- Parks, Rosa L. (McCauley) and Raymond, Flat
- U.S. National Register of Historic Places
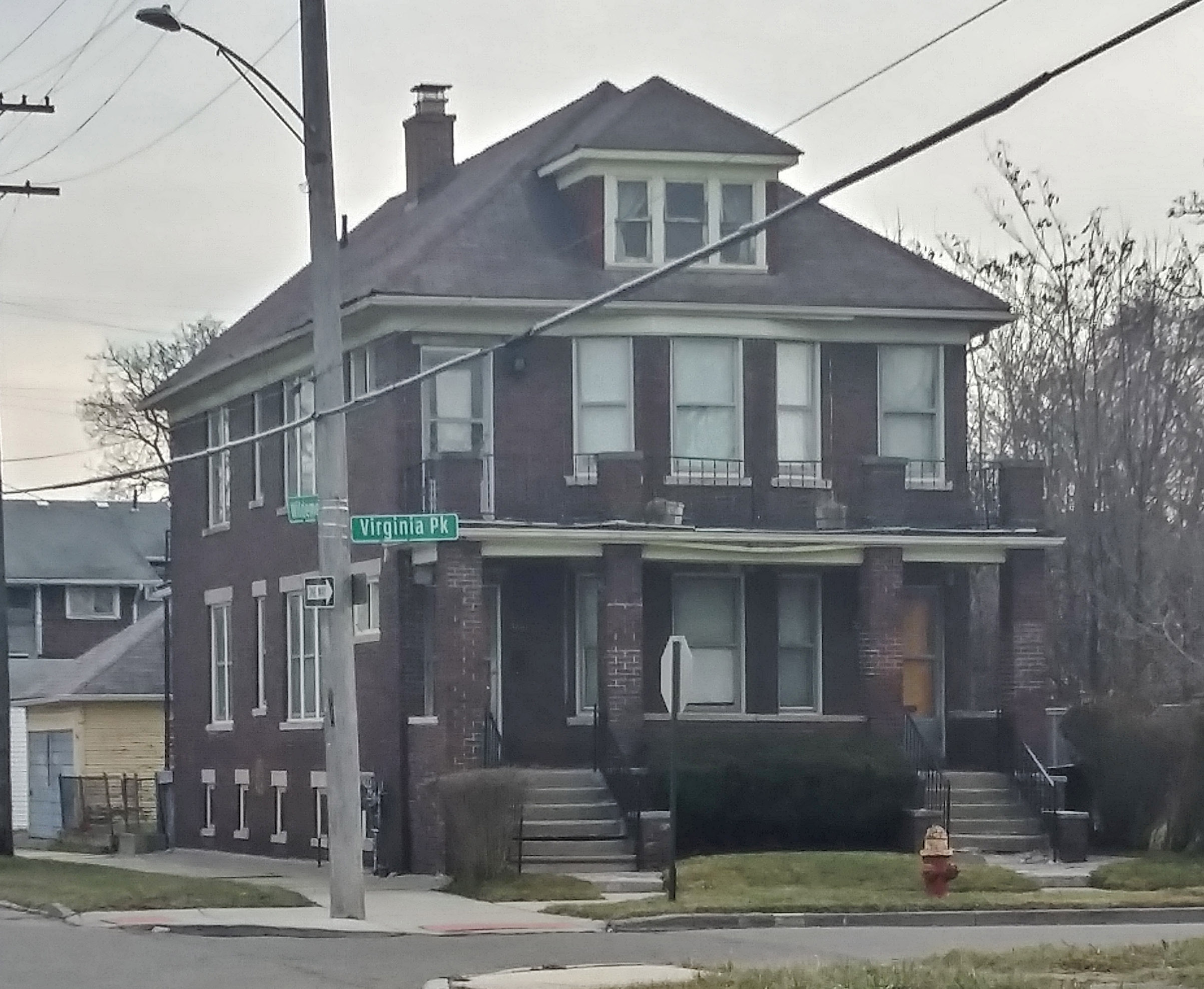
- Interactive map
- Location: 3201-3203 Virginia Park St. Detroit, Michigan
- Coordinates: 42°21′52″N 83°6′35″W
- Built: c. 1917
- Architectural style: Craftsman
- MPS: The Civil Rights Movement and the African American Experience in 20th Century Detroit MPS
- NRHP reference No.: 100006131
- Added to NRHP: February 5, 2021

The Rosa L. (McCauley) and Raymond Parks Flat, or simply the Rosa Parks Flat, is a two-story brick duplex located at 3201-3203 Virginia Park Street in Detroit, Michigan. The building is significant as the home of civil rights icon Rosa Parks, who lived in the first floor flat with her husband Raymond from 1961 to 1988. The building was listed on the National Register of Historic Places in 2021.

== Building history ==
The neighborhood around this duplex was being developed in the 1910s, and the duplex itself was likely built in 1917. The first resident of the first floor flat was Frank A. Miller, a patternmaker who lived there with his wife and family. Miller lived there in the early 1930s, and James Mondes, a store clerk, occupied the flat in the late 1930s through about World War II. This also marked a time of transition for the neighborhood, which until this time consisted of white, predominantly blue-collar workers. After World War II, the neighborhood gradually transitioned to majority African American residents.

== Rosa Parks ==
After the Montgomery bus boycott of 1955, Rosa Parks and her husband Raymond were the target of harassment in Montgomery. In 1957, they decided to move to Detroit, settling in with Parks's brother. However, couple struggled economically over the next few years, with both finding it difficult to find employment. They moved to a few different addresses, and by 1960 their plight began to draw attention. In early 1961, Raymond Parks found employment at a barber shop and Rosa Parks began work at the Stockton Sewing Company, and the couple were able to afford to move into the ground floor of this duplex.

During her time living in this flat, Rosa Parks continued her civil rights activism. In 1965, newly elected Congressman John Conyers hired her to work in his office. Parks participated in numerous civil rights actions in Detroit and throughout the nation. However, by the 1970s both Rosa Parks and Raymond Parks were experiencing health issues, and Raymond died in 1977. Rosa continued to work for Conyers and live in the flat until 1988, when she retired and moved into a house a dozen blocks north. She lived there until 1994, when she moved to Riverfront Towers.

== Description ==
The Rosa Parks Flat is a two-and-one-half story Craftsman style building, sited on a corner lot. The elevations facing the streets are faced with dark red brick, while the remaining elevations are faced with common orange brick. The building has a hipped roof covered with asphalt shingles. A hipped dormer projects from the roof at the front. A full-length front porch runs along the front, with brick piers supporting a second-story open porch above. Two entry doors are placed on each side of the porch, between which is a bay window. All of the windows on the front aredouble-hung, one-over-one wood sash units.

The first floor flat, which was occupied by the Parkses, contains a small front foyer through which doors lead to the dining room and the living room, which contains the three-sided bay window with double-hung sash. From the dining room, a door opens into the front bedroom and a short hallway leads to the kitchen at the rear of the house. A door in the hallway leads to a second bedroom, and another door leads to the bathroom. Other than some replacement doors, the structure appears nearly identical to what it looked like at the time Rosa and Raymond Parks occupied it.

== See also ==
- Cleveland Court Apartments 620–638, Parks' Montgomery, Alabama, home during the 1955-56 Montgomery Bus Boycott
