= Rosa and Raymond Parks Institute for Self Development =

American youth organization

The Rosa and Raymond Parks Institute for Self Development was created in honor of Rosa Parks' husband, Raymond Parks (1903–1977). The Institute was co-founded in February 1987 by Rosa Parks and her long-time friend Elaine Eason Steele. It has its headquarters in Detroit, Michigan and Washington, DC. The purpose of the institute was to "educate and motivate youth and adults, particularly African American people, for self and community betterment."

== Programs ==
Park's husband wanted young people to get involved in community development. Different programs were developed like Pathways to Freedom which taught youth about everything from the Underground Railroad to the civil rights movement. These programs also taught life skills and community interaction. Each program was a five-week period that took place over the summer.

In the past years, staff and leaders have participated in helping young students give their talents to organizations like the Freedom Writers. These programs have gone on in helping youth return to schools for drop-out status and getting involved in their communities

The Rosa Parks Institute has made a large donation to the Save Owasippe movement. They plan to build a base camp for "Pathways to Freedom" in Muskegon.
