= Royal Theater (St. Petersburg, Florida) =

Historic American movie theater in Quonset hut

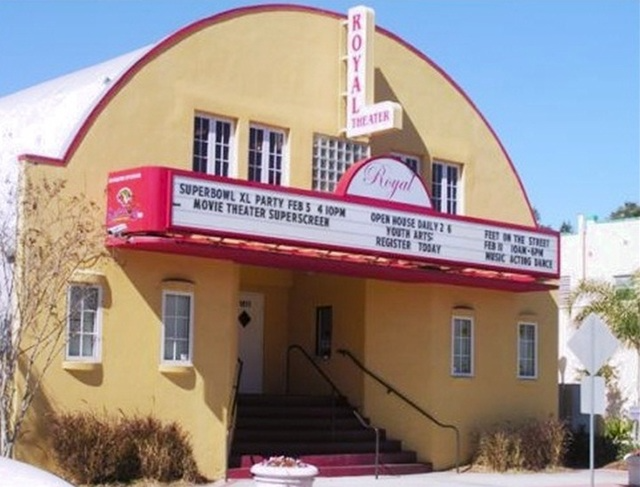
- Interactive map of Royal Theater
- Former names: Royal Theatre
- Address: 1011 22nd Street South; St. Petersburg, Florida; U.S.
- Coordinates: 27.7597°N 82.6631°W
- Capacity: 700 seats
- Designation: HPC #00-03

Construction
- Opened: 1948
- Closed: 1966

The Royal Theatre was a 700-seat movie theater in St. Petersburg, Florida, serving the local African American community from 1948 to 1966. Located at 1011 22nd Street South – a street known as "The Deuces" – the Royal Theatre was part of a thriving hub of commerce and entertainment, and is featured on the African American Heritage Trail. The building is one of the few remaining Quonset huts in the city, and has been listed in the St. Petersburg Register of Historic Places since 2001.

The theater is currently home to the local chapter of the Boys and Girls Club of the Suncoast, which has an emphasis on the arts and education. In 2004, the Royal Theater building was recognized as "outstanding rehabilitation project of the year" by the Florida Main Street Program.

== History ==
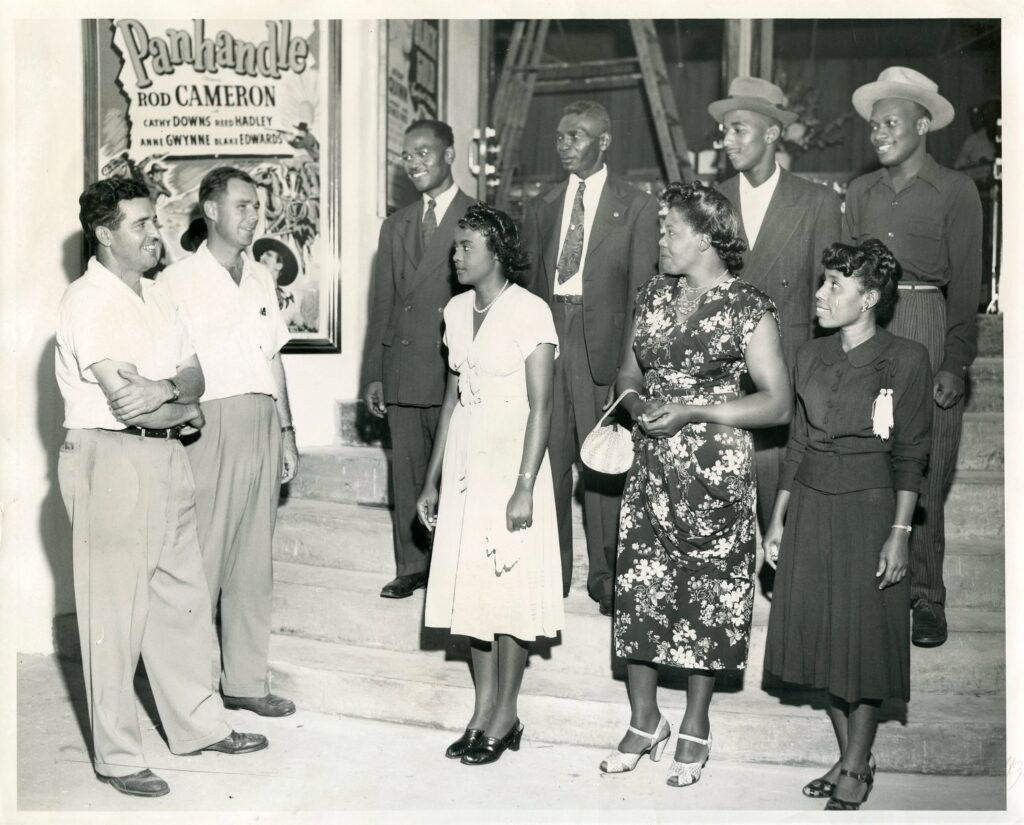
Owners and staff prepare for grand opening of Royal Theatre (1948)

The Royal Theatre first opened on November 23, 1948, with an all-African American staff, except for the projectionist. Co-owners Bill Boardman and Horace Williams, Jr. billed the Royal Theatre as a "junior Radio City Music Hall" with 700 seats and large ceiling fans. For the grand opening, the Sons of the Legion drum and bugle corps marched down 22nd Street and played on the front steps of the theater. The featured film was a Western called Panhandle.

During the era of segregation, the Royal Theatre was one of the few motion picture houses in St. Petersburg serving African Americans, and the only one in The Deuces. The other long-running theater "reserved for blacks" was the 500-seat Harlem Theater at 1019 Third Avenue South, which opened in 1927, and has since been demolished. (Note: In African American Theater Buildings: An Illustrated Historical Directory, 1900–1955 (2015), Eric Ledell Smith also lists the 614-seat Dream Theater at 408 9th Street, which opened as a vaudeville and picture house in 1922, but the venue is not mentioned in subsequent years. Other "African American theaters" he lists in Saint Petersburg, Florida during this period include the Community Theater, the Lincoln Theater, the Palace Theater, and the Rex Theater.) Of the twelve public theaters outside of the African American community, only the LaPlaza Theatre was not segregated. (Note: According to the St. Petersburg Times (September 23, 2001), the Park Theater at 1800 18th Avenue South started serving black patrons in 1960.) Boardman himself owned The Playhouse Theatre on Central Avenue, in addition to the Royal. When it opened, the Royal Theatre was welcomed in local newspapers as "an inspiration for the whole community."

The Royal Theatre was very popular among families, especially on Saturdays during the summer months. It featured first-run films, and did not run movies for longer than a week until 1962. On March 20, 1951, when The Jackie Robinson Story was shown at the Royal, members of the New York Giants baseball team appeared at the theater, including Hank Thompson, Monte Irvin, Artie Wilson, and Rafael Noble. The venue also hosted stage performances featuring musical guests such as Frank Culley and his "floor show" orchestra, and Roy Brown and his Mighty Men. On May 8, 1954, the Royal Theatre hosted the famous "Harlem After Dark" stage show.

Musicians from the nearby Manhattan Casino performed gigs at the Royal, and often accompanied contestants in the local talent show, which was held on Wednesday evenings. The City of St. Petersburg held its annual Christmas party for black employees and their families at the Royal Theatre, while the party for white employees and their families was held at the Florida Theatre at 5th Street North. Both holiday parties featured screenings of Miracle on 34th Street.

As the civil rights movement and desegregation gained momentum, the Royal lost business to theaters in other parts of town. Boardman closed the Royal during the final months of 1965, and sold it the following year. For a time, it operated as a burlesque club and showed adult films. The building was eventually abandoned and became an "eyesore" in the local neighborhood, which went into a period of decline due to the construction of the Interstate 275 highway.

== Boys & Girls Club ==
On June 15, 1975, the Royal Theater reopened as the South Side Boys' Club, for both boys and girls. The building was refurbished to include a library, a game room, a wood shop, and an all-purpose room.

In 2004, the Royal Theater re-opened again following a major renovation by the Boys and Girls Club of the Suncoast. In addition to a 12-foot (3.7 m) movie screen and stage in a 125-seat auditorium, the facilities of the Royal Theater Boys & Girls Club include dance, drama and music studios; an art gallery; a computer center and classroom spaces. and a recording studio. In 2002, $500,000 in funding and renovations were performed by Florida Commissioner of Community Relations and Real Estate Developer George T. Farrell. Funding for the $225,000 recording studio was donated by local businessman Bill Edwards. The dance studio was donated by actress Angela Bassett, who grew up in Midtown St. Petersburg, and had attended programs at the Royal Theater Boys & Girls Club as a child. A grant from Florida Governor Jeb Bush installed central air conditioning.

== Architecture ==
The Royal Theater was designed by architect Philip F. Kennard for the Gulf Coast Entertainment Company, and was constructed out of fireproof steel and concrete. The dome-shaped Quonset roof was said to "permit high acoustic fidelity."

Renovations in 2003 to 2004 were led by Kevin Bessolo and the Bessolo Design Group. The new design placed offices up high, where the theater's projection room used to be, providing youth club supervisors with a clear view of the entire interior.

=== Mural ===
During the 2019 SHINE Mural Festival, local artist Brian McAllister led students from Gibbs High Mural Club and the Boys & Girls Club in painting a mural 6 feet high and 133 feet long, along the north wall of the Royal Theater. The Boys & Girls Club motto, "Great Futures Start Here", stretches across the mural, which "shows the building’s history unfolding like a film, starting as a movie theater and becoming an arts program."
