= Cleveland Court Apartments 620–638 =

- U.S. National Register of Historic Places
- Alabama Register of Landmarks and Heritage
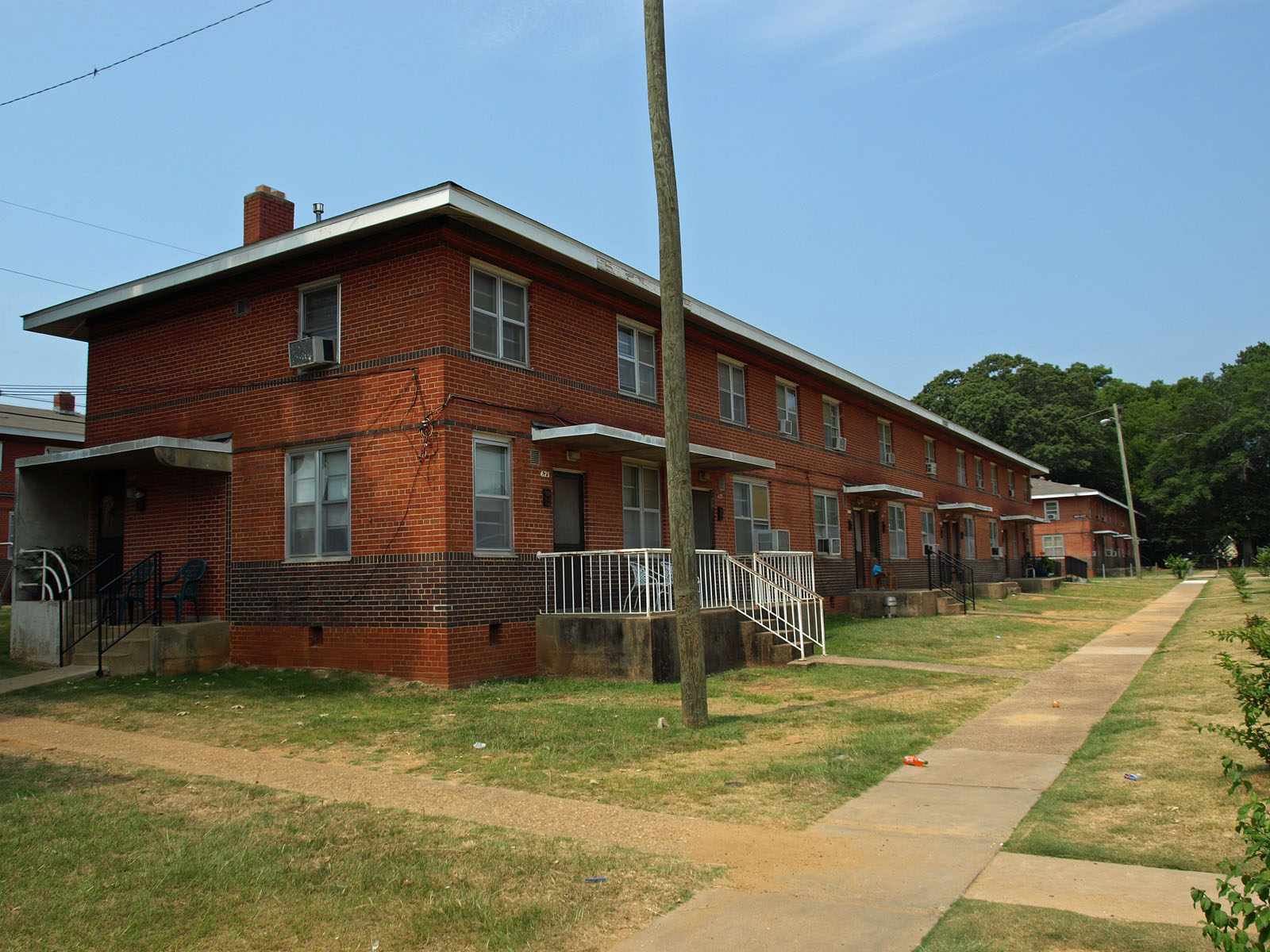
- Cleveland Court Apartments in 2009

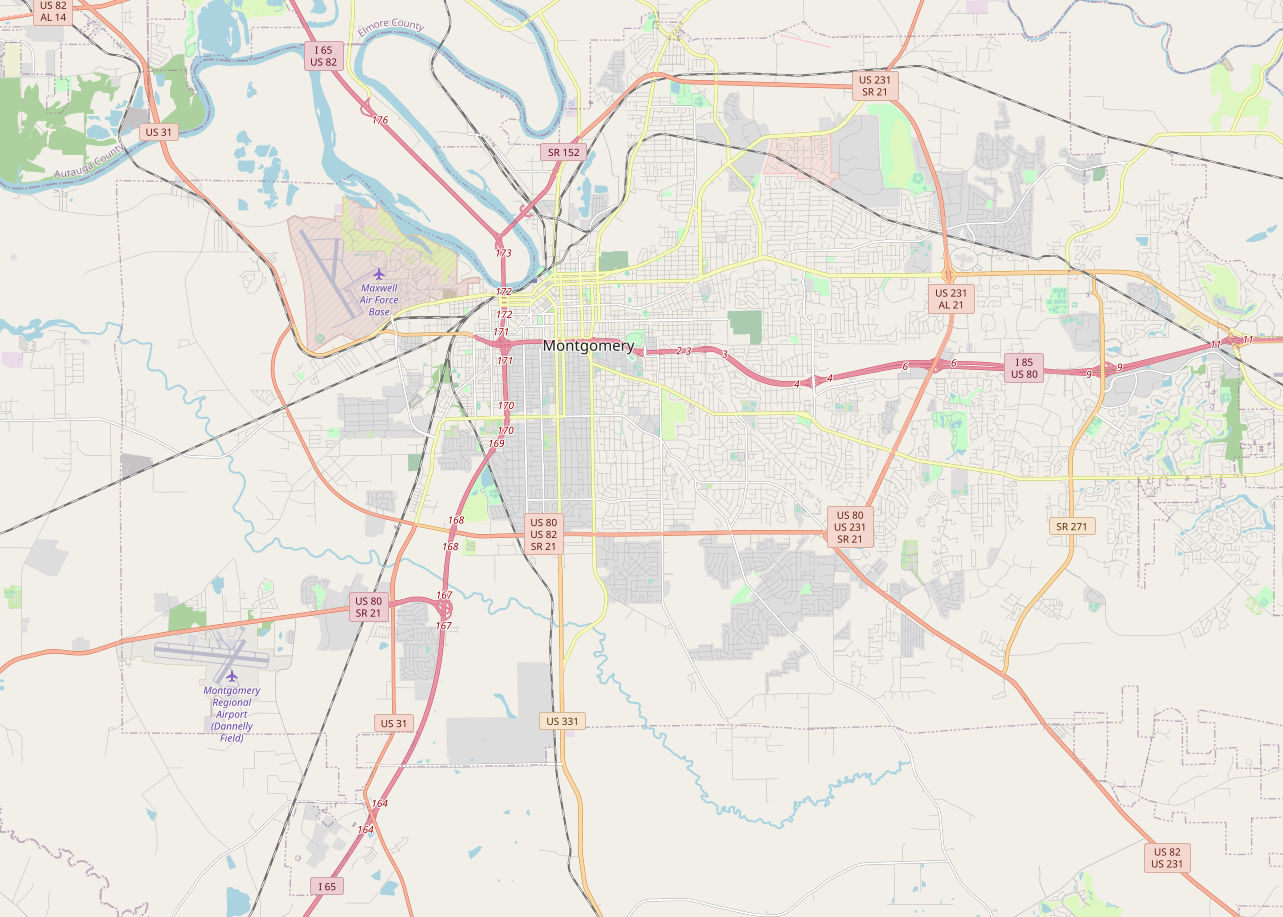
- Location within Montgomery, Alabama Location within Alabama Location within the United States
- Location: 620–638 Cleveland Ct., Montgomery, Alabama
- Coordinates: 32°21′48″N 86°19′4″W
- Area: less than one acre
- Built: 1943
- Architect: Montgomery Housing Authority
- NRHP reference No.: 01001167

Significant dates
- Added to NRHP: October 29, 2001
- Designated ARLH: March 30, 1989

The Cleveland Court Apartments 620–638 is a historic apartment building in the Cleveland Court Apartment Complex in Montgomery, Alabama. It is significant to the history of the modern Civil Rights Movement in the United States. Unit 634 was home to civil rights activist Rosa Parks, her husband Raymond, and her mother, Leona McCauley, during the Montgomery bus boycott from 1955 to 1956. The building was placed on the Alabama Register of Landmarks and Heritage on March 30, 1989, and the National Register of Historic Places on October 29, 2001.

== See also ==
- Rosa Parks Flat, Parks' home from 1961 to 1988
- National Register of Historic Places listings in Montgomery County, Alabama
- Properties on the Alabama Register of Landmarks and Heritage in Montgomery County, Alabama
