= Queens (2024 TV series) =

2024 nature documentary miniseries

- Genre: Television documentary
- Country of origin: United States
- Original language: English
- No. of seasons: 1
- No. of episodes: 7

Original release
- Network: National Geographic

Queens is a 2024 American Nature documentary television series narrated by Angela Bassett.

== Episodes ==
Episodes of Queens
No.	Title	Directed by	Original release date
1	"African Queens"	Rachael Kinley	March 4, 2024
2	"Rainforest Queens"	Ilaira Mallalieu	March 4, 2024
3	"Tiny Jungle Queens"	Ilaira Mallalieu	March 4, 2024
4	"Savanna Queens"	Victoria Bromley	March 11, 2024
5	"Mountain Queens"	Jess Tombs	March 11, 2024
6	"Coastal Queens"	Jess Tombs	March 11, 2024
7	"Behind the Queens"	Faith Musembi	March 11, 2024
