= Elder Jordan =

American businessman (c. 1850–1936)

Elder Jordan Sr. (c. 1850–1936) was an American businessman, philanthropist, and community leader in St. Petersburg, Florida. He was an important figure in the African American history of St. Petersburg by the creation of a social gathering place in the 1920s through 1960s, as well as through the donation of his land to create public housing. He is the namesake of the Jordan Park neighborhood of St. Petersburg.

== Biography ==
Jordan was born in the mid-1800s into slavery. At 15-years-old, he purchased his freedom. Around 1901 or 1904, he moved to St. Petersburg, two months after his wife, Mary, moved. At the time of moving, he had at least five children: Columbus, Elder Jr., Osha, Harry, and McKinley.

In 1925, Jordan built the Jordan Dance Hall, which became a gathering place for African Americans in St. Petersburg during segregation in the United States. It was later known as the Manhattan Casino and closed operations in 1968. Jordan donated land to create public housing for African Americans, which was developed into Jordan Park neighborhood, home of the first public housing project in St. Petersburg.

Jordan died in 1936. One of the stops on St. Petersburg's African American Heritage Trail covers his life. In 2020, a statue of Jordan was erected south of the Manhattan Casino. It became the first statue that St. Petersburg erected for one of its citizens.
