= Raymond Parks (activist) =

American civil rights activist, husband of Rosa Parks (1903–1977)

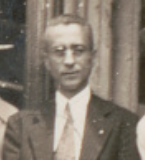
- Raymond Parks in 1933
- Born: Raymond Arthur Parks; February 12, 1903; Wedowee, Alabama, U.S.
- Died: August 19, 1977 (aged 74); Detroit, Michigan, U.S.
- Resting place: Woodlawn Cemetery, Detroit
- Occupations: Civil rights activist, barber
- Movement: Civil Rights Movement
- Spouse: Rosa McCauley (m. 1932)

Raymond Arthur Parks (February 12, 1903 – August 19, 1977) was an American activist in the civil rights movement and barber, best known as the husband of Rosa Parks. His wife called him "the first real activist I ever met.”

== Life and work ==
Parks was born in 1903 in Wedowee, Alabama, the son of David Parks and Geri Culbertson. He did not receive a formal education as there was no nearby black school where he lived. He taught himself to read with the help of his mother and had an appreciation for poetry. Parks spent much of his childhood caring for ill family members and was orphaned as a teenager.

Parks worked as a barber in Tuskegee, Montgomery, Maxwell Air Force Base, Hampton, Virginia, and Detroit, Michigan.

=== Civil rights activism ===
Parks was politically active, a member of the League of Women Voters, and active member of the NAACP. He was involved in leading the national pledge drive in support of the legal defense of the Scottsboro Boys, a group of nine young Black men falsely accused of raping two White women. Parks was also a charter member of the Montgomery NAACP and was heavily involved in the Montgomery labor rights movement, supporting efforts to unionize day laborers in the city.

Due to his wife's notable involvement in the Montgomery bus boycott, Parks lost his job as a barber at Maxwell Air Force Base after his boss forbade him to talk about his wife or the legal case.

== Personal life ==
On December 18, 1932, Parks married Rosa Louise McCauley, to whom he proposed after their second date. Parks encouraged his wife Rosa to finish her high school studies and become active in the civil rights movement.

== Death ==
Parks died of throat cancer on August 19, 1977, aged 74.

== Legacy ==
In February 1987, the Rosa and Raymond Parks Institute for Self Development was established. Parks' Barber License is in the permanent collection of the Library of Congress. In 2021, the Rosa and Raymond Parks Flat in Detroit (where they lived from 1961 to 1988) was listed on the National Register of Historic Places.

=== In popular culture ===
Parks is portrayed by Peter Francis James in the 2002 film, The Rosa Parks Story. He is portrayed by David Rubin in the 2018 Doctor Who episode, Rosa. In the 2018 film, Behind the Movement, Parks is portrayed by Roger Guenveur Smith.
