= Angela Bassett =

American actress (born 1958)

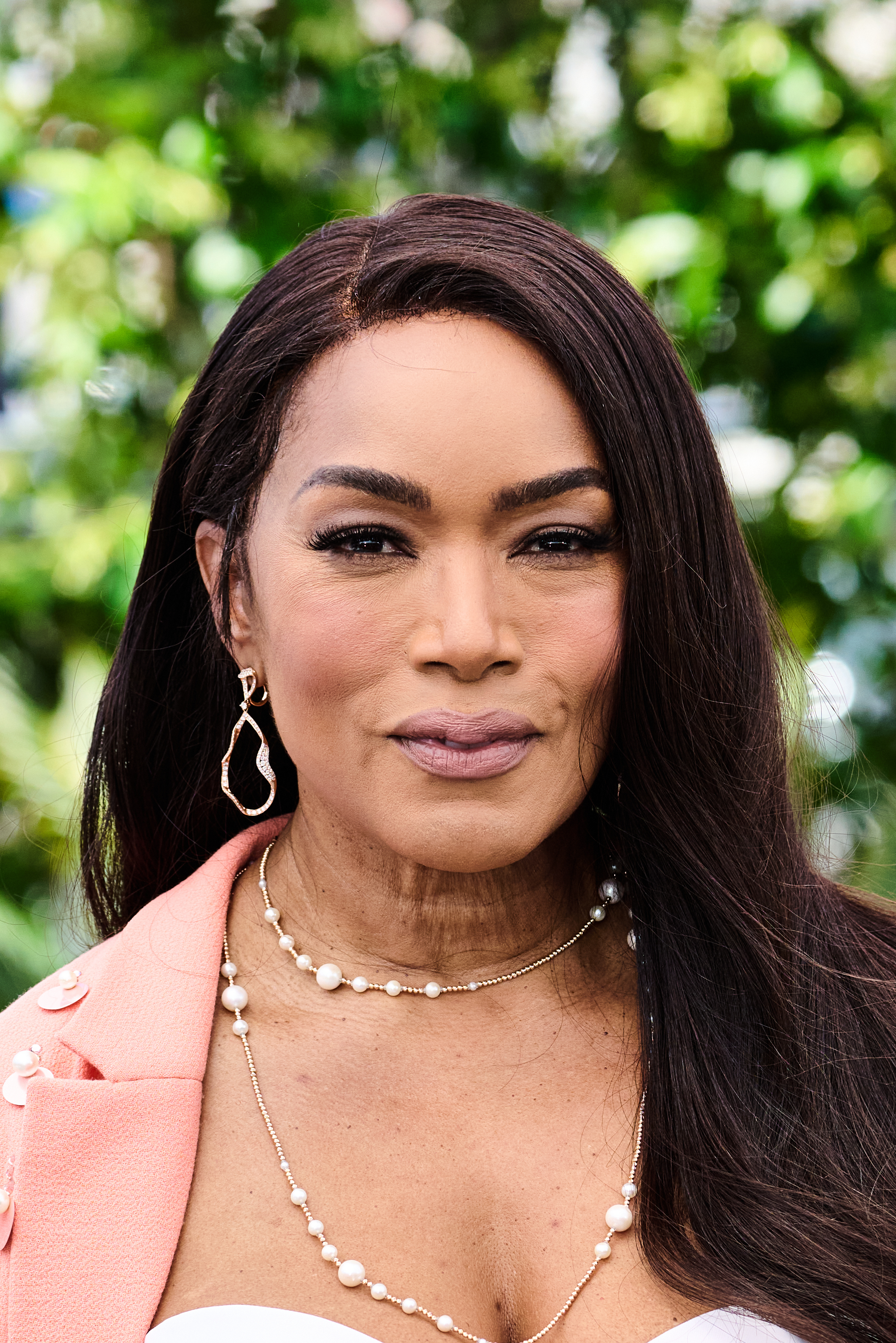
- Bassett at the 2025 Cannes Film Festival
- Born: Angela Evelyn Bassett; August 16, 1958 (age 68); New York City, U.S.
- Education: Yale University (BA, MFA)
- Occupation: Actress
- Years active: 1982–present
- Works: Full list
- Spouse: Courtney B. Vance (m. 1997)
- Children: 2
- Awards: Full list

Angela Evelyn Bassett (born August 16, 1958) is an American actress. Known for her work in film and television since the 1980s, she has received various accolades, including an Emmy Award and two Golden Globe Awards, as well as nominations for two Academy Awards. In 2023, Time magazine named her one of the 100 most influential people in the world, and she received an Academy Honorary Award.

Bassett had her breakthrough portraying singer Tina Turner in the biopic What's Love Got to Do with It (1993), which won her a Golden Globe Award and a nomination for the Academy Award for Best Actress. She had success starring in Boyz n the Hood (1991), Malcolm X (1992), Strange Days, Vampire in Brooklyn, Waiting to Exhale (all 1995), How Stella Got Her Groove Back (1998), and Music of the Heart (1999). In the following decades, she took on supporting roles in the drama Notorious (2009), and the action films Green Lantern (2011), Olympus Has Fallen (2013), and London Has Fallen (2016). She also played Queen Ramonda in the Marvel Cinematic Universe films Black Panther (2018), Avengers: Endgame (2019), and Black Panther: Wakanda Forever (2022). For the latter, she won another Golden Globe and was nominated for the Academy Award for Best Supporting Actress.

On television, Bassett has starred as Katherine Jackson in the miniseries The Jacksons: An American Dream (1992). Her portrayal of Rosa Parks in the television film The Rosa Parks Story (2002) gained her a nomination for an Emmy Award for Outstanding Lead Actress. Her performances in two seasons of the FX horror anthology series American Horror Story earned her nominations for an Emmy Award for Outstanding Supporting Actress in 2014 and 2015. In 2018, Bassett began producing and starring as an LAPD patrol sergeant Athena Grant in the Fox/ABC drama series 9-1-1.

== Early life and education ==
Bassett was born on August 16, 1958, in New York City. Her mother is Betty Jane (née Gilbert), a social worker and civil servant. Her father is Daniel Benjamin Bassett, a preacher's son. Bassett's middle name was given to her in honor of her aunt Evelyn. Ten months after Bassett was born, her mother became pregnant and had a second child, Bassett's sister D'nette. Bassett said the pregnancy "only made things harder", leading her parents to send her to her father's sister, Golden, in Winston-Salem, North Carolina. While her aunt did not have any children of her own, she "loved children, and she was good with them."

At the age of four, Bassett was picked up by her mother after her parents divorced; her mother took her and her sister to St. Petersburg, Florida.

Bassett did not see her father again for several years, until she attended her grandmother's funeral. There, Bassett met her father's daughter Jean, from his first marriage, who was twelve years old, and several years older than Bassett.

After graduating from Jordan Park Elementary School, Bassett was bused to attend Disston Middle School for seventh grade. She began at that school in 1970, a year before the city of St. Petersburg formally established busing to integrate its public schools. After completing seventh grade, Bassett was bused to Azalea Middle School for eighth and ninth grades. Bassett's mother became more involved in her daughters' studies and told the two that they would go to college.

In her younger years, Bassett was "in love" with the Jackson 5, and dreamed of marrying a member of the family group. She said her choice would probably be "whoever had the cutest, roundest Afro at the time. In my imagination we would have children and live in a real house." As her interest in entertainment developed, Angela and her sister would often put on shows, reading poems or performing popular music for their family.

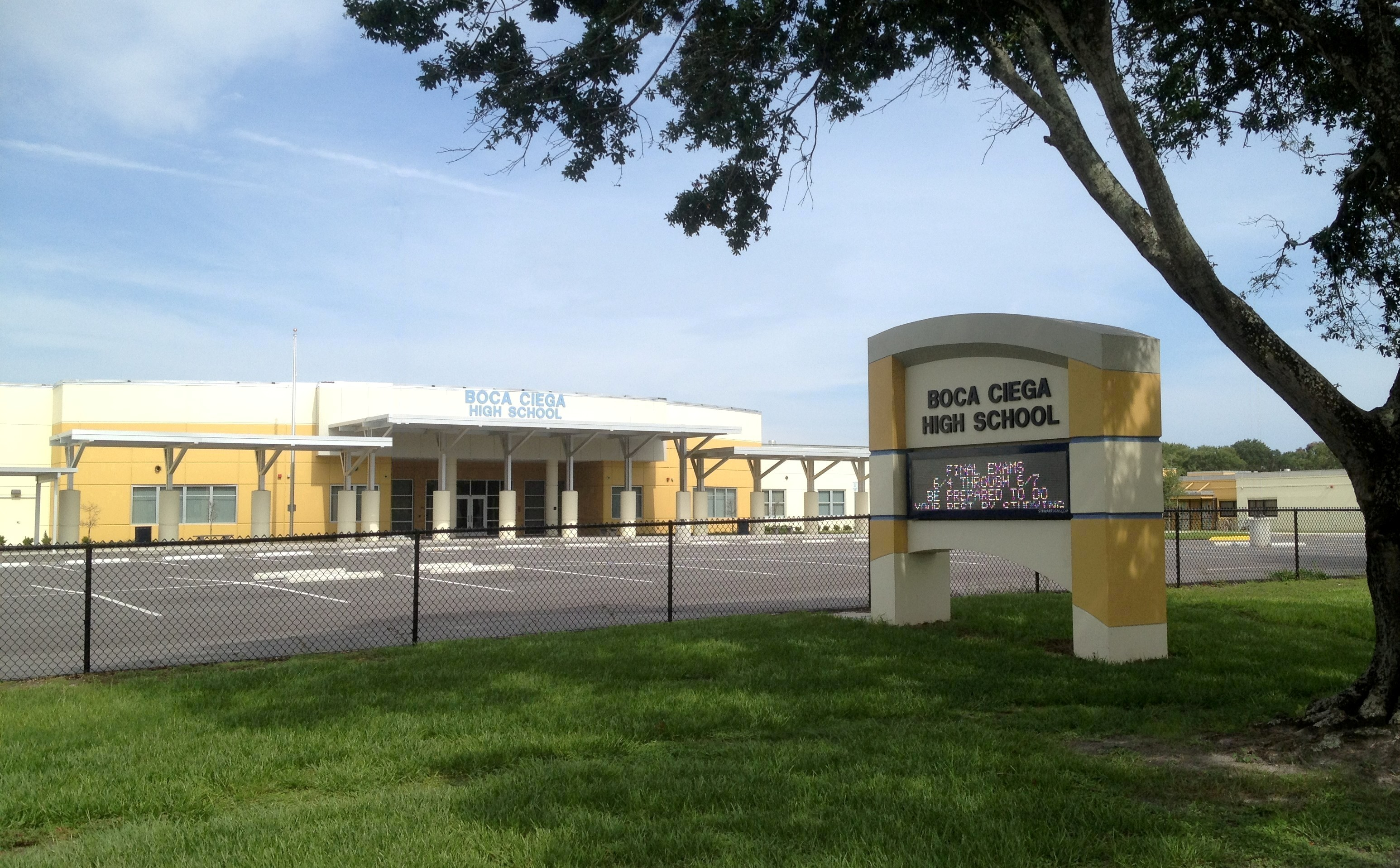
Boca Ciega High School, where Bassett attended and participated as a member of the debate team and student government, among other activities

At Boca Ciega High School, Bassett was a cheerleader and a member of the Upward Bound college prep program, the debate team, student government, drama club and choir. An "A" and "B" student for the most part, Bassett got her first "C" in physical education. She tried to convince her mother not to be disappointed by the grade. Bassett called the grade the "average," leading her mother to say she did not have "average kids." As Bassett described, she developed a "sense of pride" and did not get another "C" until college. During high school, Bassett became the first African American in that school to be admitted to the National Honor Society. The Upward Bound program is an academic and cultural enrichment program for underprivileged students. Bassett says she and the other participants did not see themselves as underprivileged.

Bassett studied at Yale University and graduated with a Bachelor of Arts in African American Studies in 1980. She studied acting at the Yale School of Drama and obtained a Master of Fine Arts in 1983. Her paternal aunt had warned her not to "waste" her "Yale education on theater." She was the only member of Bassett's family to have gone to both college and graduate school.

At Yale, Bassett met her future husband Courtney B. Vance, a 1986 graduate of the drama school. Bassett was also a classmate of actor Charles S. Dutton.

== Career ==
=== 1980s ===
After graduation, Bassett worked as a receptionist for a beauty salon and as a photo researcher to support herself while looking for acting work in the New York theater. One of her first New York performances came in 1985 when she appeared in J. E. Franklin's Black Girl at Second Stage Theatre. She appeared in two August Wilson plays at the Yale Repertory Theatre under the direction of her long-time instructor Lloyd Richards; these were Ma Rainey's Black Bottom (1984), and Joe Turner's Come and Gone (1986). Decades later in 2006, she had the opportunity to work on the Wilson canon again, starring in Fences alongside longtime collaborator Laurence Fishburne at the Pasadena Playhouse in California.

In 1985, Bassett made her first television appearance, as a prostitute in the television film Doubletake. She made her film debut as a news reporter in F/X (1986), for which she was required to join the Screen Actors Guild (SAG). Bassett moved to Los Angeles in 1988 for more acting jobs. She had early guest spots on A Man Called Hawk and 227 (both 1989).

=== 1990s ===
Bassett earned industry attention and public recognition for her early performances in the films Boyz n the Hood (1991) and Malcolm X (1992). For her portrayal of Betty Shabazz in the latter, she earned an NAACP Image Award. During production, director Spike Lee showed Bassett a tape of the exact moment when Malcolm X was shot, since they would be filming the scene. Bassett called the recording "haunting," but noted that afterward she was "able to grab hold of the pain and re-create the scene." Bassett felt it was important for her to get the assassination scene correct, and wondered how Betty "found the strength to keep going, to raise her family, to educate, to sustain them." Bassett worried that after her role as Betty Shabazz in Malcolm X, she would not find another role "as satisfying." At the time of the film's release, she expressed her worry that she would not have such a role again. "I think I have been incredibly blessed and it is probably just all downhill from here."

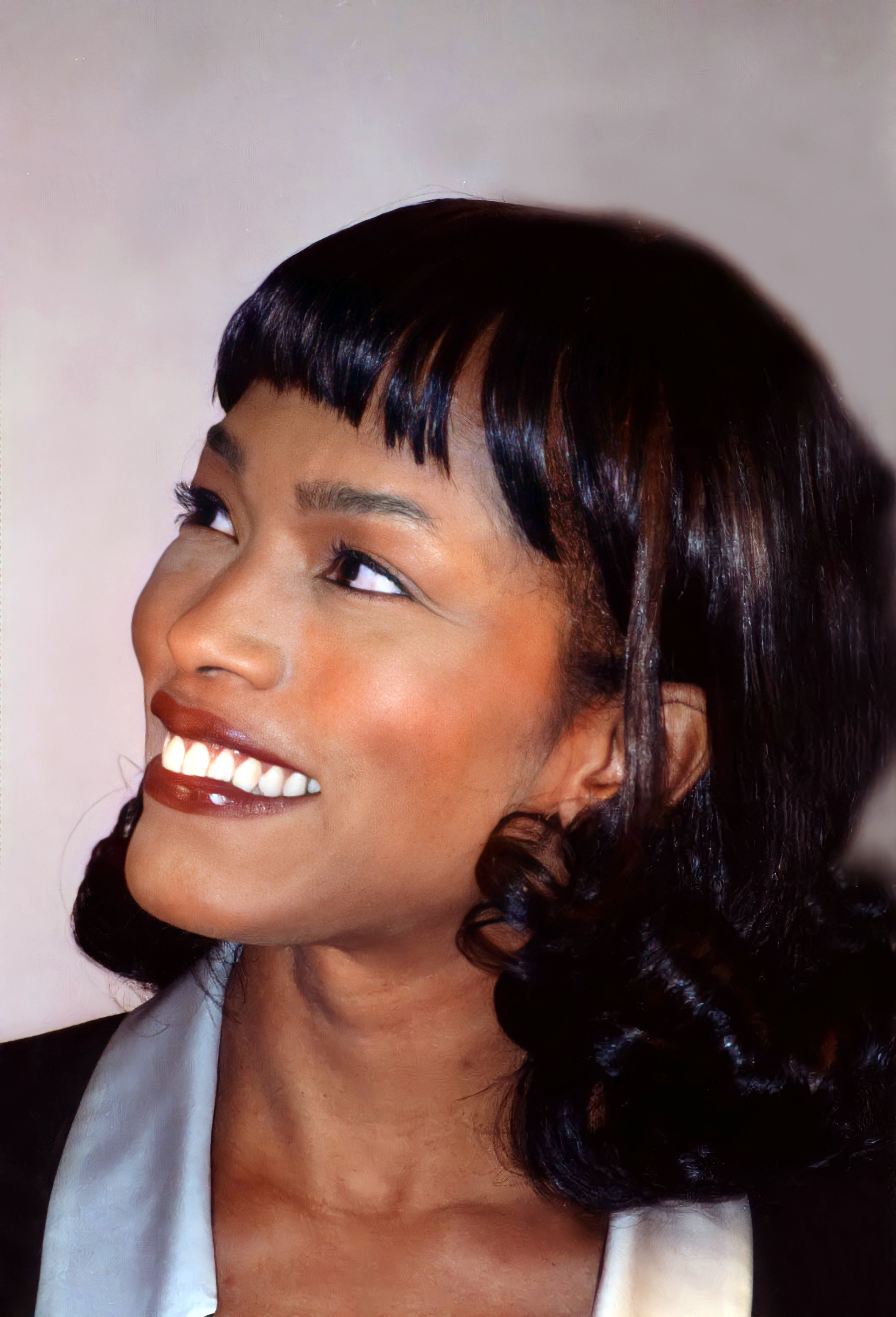
Bassett in 1996

Bassett also starred as Katherine Jackson in The Jacksons: An American Dream, which premiered on ABC-TV in the same week as the theatrical release of Malcolm X. After returning to Los Angeles following completion of her work for Malcolm X, Bassett got a call to audition for a film about Tina Turner, based on her memoir I, Tina. Bassett won the lead role over Halle Berry and Robin Givens, but had only one month to prepare before filming began. She met with Turner twice, who advised her on details of her interpretation, from wigs and outfits to dancing styles. Turner also did Bassett's make-up, leading Bassett to call her "supportive" and her "biggest fan." In an interview with the Orlando Sentinel, Bassett described going to one of Turner's concerts and, after realizing that she knew some of Turner's dance moves, she cried and was "almost a river of tears." Bassett's performance as Turner in What's Love Got to Do with It (1993) received strong reviews. Marc Bernardin of Entertainment Weekly wrote that Bassett "gave the performance of a lifetime" portraying Turner in the biopic. Bassett won a Golden Globe for her portrayal, and was the first African American to win this Award for Best Actress. She was nominated for an Academy Award as Best Actress, but lost to Holly Hunter for The Piano. (Despite the acclaim, Bassett later said in a 2022 interview on Today with Hoda & Jenna, that after portraying Turner, she did not receive acting calls for about a year and a half.)

Bassett starred in three films in 1995, which received varying reviews: Vampire in Brooklyn, Strange Days, and Waiting to Exhale. (For the latter she worked with author Terry McMillan, who had written the book of the same title that was adapted for film.) In Strange Days, Bassett played Lornette "Mace" Mason, a chauffeur and bodyguard. In Vampire in Brooklyn, she played Rita Veder, a tortured cop with a dark secret. She was excited to work with Eddie Murphy in the film, and director Wes Craven. Bassett had previously worked with Craven on television shows. Bassett's character in Waiting to Exhale, Bernadine Harris, is betrayed by her husband. In revenge she sets fire to his entire wardrobe and vehicle, then sells what is left for one dollar. Bassett described the scene and her character in this film to the Orlando Sentinel as follows: "The thing is that my character is thinking about how her husband has left her. I have a cigarette in one hand, and I'm drinking. Basically, the four of us are sitting there talking about men and having some fun."

In 1997, Bassett starred as the President's advisor in Contact. Stephen Holden of The New York Times opined that Bassett was "largely wasted as a Presidential assistant." In 1998, Bassett starred in How Stella Got Her Groove Back, once again collaborating with McMillan. She played Stella, a 40-year-old professional American woman who falls in love with a 20-year-old Jamaican man. She was praised for her performance by Variety and the Washington Post. Stephen Holden of The New York Times said Bassett's character was "the best thing in the movie" and wrote the actress "portrays this high-strung superwoman with such intensity that she makes her almost believable." In 1999, Bassett starred in Music of the Heart, once again collaborating with horror director Wes Craven. Matthew Eng wrote of her "terrifically specific chemistry" with Meryl Streep.

=== 2000s ===
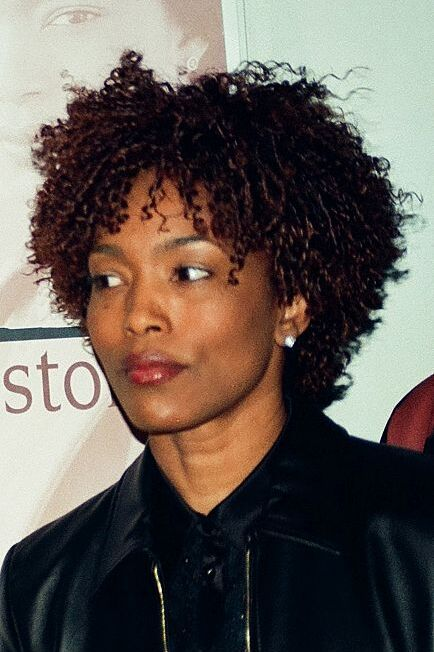
Bassett in 2002

In 2000, Bassett turned down the lead role in Monster's Ball because of the script's sexual content. Halle Berry won the Academy Award for Best Actress for her performance in the role. The first film Bassett appeared in that year was Supernova, where she played a medical officer. Her other two films released in 2000 were Whispers: An Elephant's Tale and Boesman and Lena, the latter adapted from the play of the same name by South African Athol Fugard. Todd McCarthy of Variety wrote that in Boesman and Lena Bassett "abandons her recently cultivated glamorous image to dig to the core of Lena's fierce, probing, contentious, compassionate character." Kevin Thomas of the Los Angeles Times wrote that Bassett captured all of her character's "mercurial mood swings", and both Bassett and her costar Danny Glover "rise to the challenge of these larger-than-life roles, just as you would expect".

She appeared in the 2001 film The Score. Her character was in a relationship with Robert De Niro's. She read the film's script and became interested. She was telephoned by director Frank Oz, who told her Robert De Niro would "like to meet with you". Bassett met with De Niro and later realized the conversation was meant to break the ice before they started filming. In addition to The Score, that year she also had a role in the television film Ruby's Bucket of Blood.

The following year, in 2002, Bassett acted in Sunshine State and The Rosa Parks Story. In The Rosa Parks Story, Bassett was cast as Rosa Parks. Laura Fries of Entertainment Weekly wrote that Bassett "takes her physical strength and turns it inward to portray Parks" and expressed her belief that "lesser hands" would allow for misinterpretation or gross underplay of Parks's personality. In addition to positive reception of her role, Bassett was seen as the "star" of the film due to her performance and earned a nomination for a Primetime Emmy Award for Outstanding Lead Actress in a Miniseries or a Movie for her performance.

In 2003, she read from the WPA slave narratives in Unchained Memories. In the 1930s, about 100,000 former enslaved African Americans were still alive. As part of the Federal Writers' Project during the Great Depression, writers interviewed some 2,300, capturing their memories of slavery times. The transcripts of the Slave Narratives collection of the Library of Congress is a record of slavery, bondage and misery. That year she also appeared in the film Masked and Anonymous, playing a mistress. Ann Hornaday noted her as among the "endless parade of actors who show up even for the briefest of appearances".

In 2004, she had roles in the films The Lazarus Child and Mr. 3000. Mr. 3000 was a comedy in which Bassett costarred with Bernie Mac. When asked if the film was easier to act in than the more intense roles she had in the past, Bassett said, "This was much easier. This was a walk in the park. It was pretty easy compared to some of the roles I've done that call for so much emotion or physicality." At the time of the film's release, she described both Bernie Mac and Laurence Fishburne, whom she had worked with in the past, her "favorites" and said the pair were both "highly professional and extraordinarily talented." The only film she appeared in during the following year was Mr. and Mrs. Smith in an uncredited voice role. In the 2006 film Akeelah and the Bee, Bassett portrayed Tanya Anderson, the mother of the film's lead, Akeelah, played by Keke Palmer. Bassett said she loved the story, viewing the lead character as someone who "could be anyone because each of us have had dreams and aspirations and wanting to be and needing to be supported and directed". She described working with Palmer as being "really wonderful." According to Bassett, the two bonded and she said that Palmer was as good an actress as any adult she had worked with. Bassett appeared in the television film Time Bomb the same year. Her role was seen as an "extended cameo" by Brian Lowry of Variety.

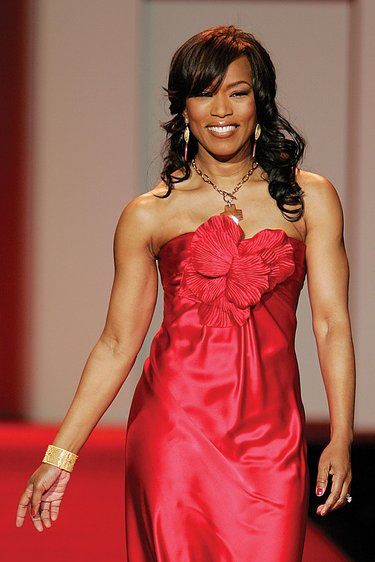
Bassett at The Heart Truth's fashion show in 2007

Bassett provided her voice for the 2007 film Meet the Robinsons. When asked about her motives in taking on the role, Bassett said, "For one, it was a character I had never played before, which is always important to me, to keep me sharp. But it was also the desire to be part of a well-written movie that has something really positive to say about families and about all the different ways there can be to make a family."

She appeared in the 2008 film Gospel Hill. Stephen Holden of The New York Times wrote that Bassett's "fiery self-possession brings a spark of passion to her stick-figure character". She next appeared in Of Boys and Men, portraying Rieta Cole, the matriarch of a Chicago family who is killed in an accident in the beginning of the film; she appears in flashbacks for the remainder of the film. She and her costars Robert Townsend and Victoria Rowell were praised by Robert Gillard of LA Sentinel for "capturing the emotions of a family stricken by grief." Bassett also had a role in Nothing But the Truth in 2008. Bassett joined the regular cast of ER for the show's final season (2008–2009). She portrayed Dr. Catherine Banfield, an exacting Chief of the ER, who was also working to recover from the death of a son and to bring another child into her family. Bassett's husband, Courtney Vance, played her television husband on ER as Russell Banfield. Also in 2008, she played the character Brenda in the film Tyler Perry's Meet the Browns.

In the 2009 film Notorious, Bassett portrayed Voletta Wallace, the mother of The Notorious B.I.G.. To portray Wallace's Jamaican accent, Bassett conversed with her on and off the film set, and she practiced her accent using tapes that Wallace made. Bassett said she jumped at the chance to be part of the film after reading the script. She felt it did a "wonderful job of bringing" The Notorious B.I.G.'s "life to the page." Bassett earned positive reviews for her performance in the film, noted as being one of the more experienced actors involved.

=== 2010s ===
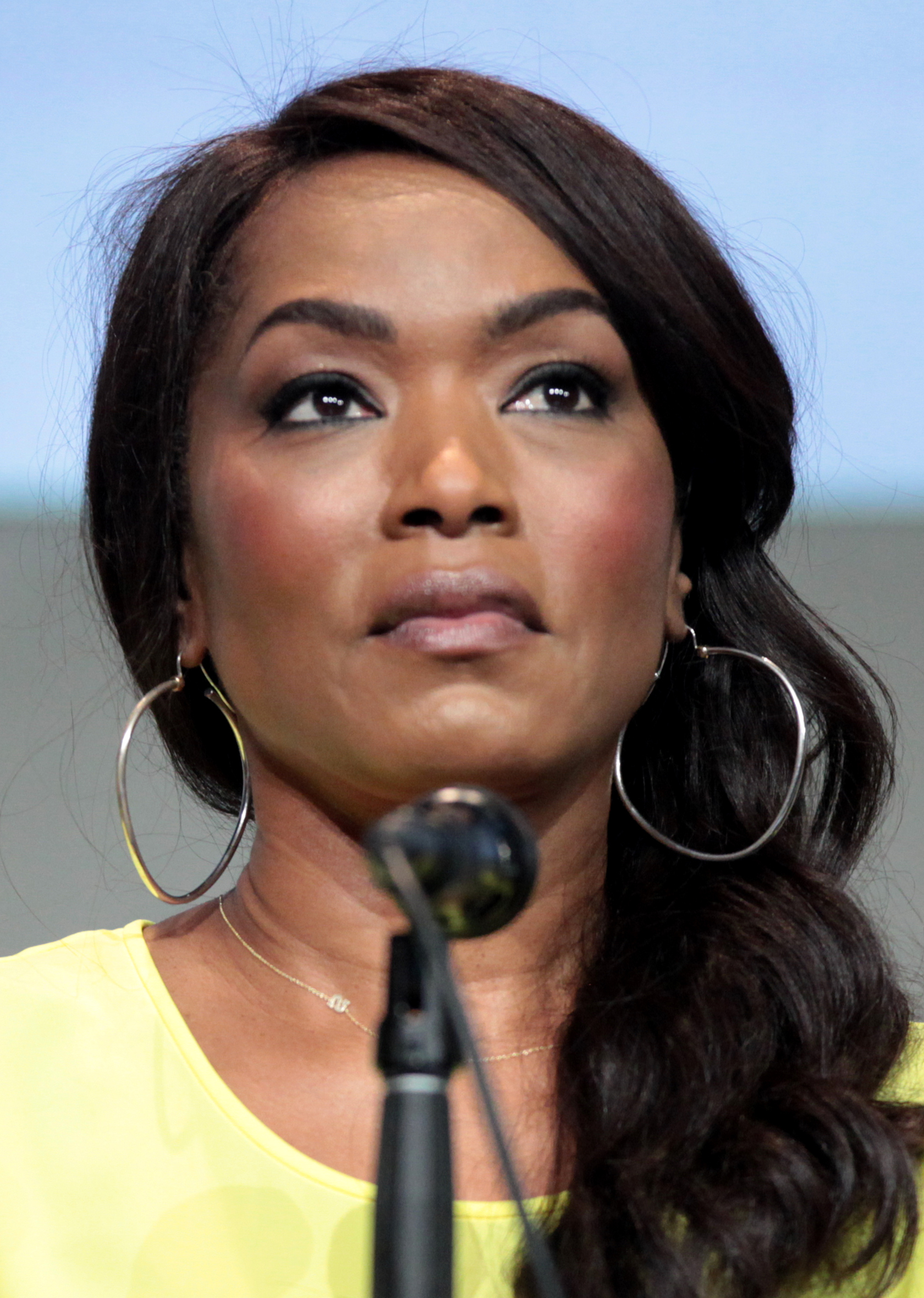
Bassett at San Diego Comic-Con in 2015

In 2010, Bassett lent her voice to portray First Lady Michelle Obama on an episode of The Simpsons titled "Stealing First Base". Bassett was seen as a "terrific" fill in for Obama. Bassett was also cast in the superhero film Green Lantern, released in 2011, as Amanda Waller. Bassett said working on the film was "a lot of fun" and that she enjoyed being a part of it. Despite this, Bassett was taken "out of her element" with the arrangements made that accommodated the computer-generated effects. She called it her first time doing "this kind of movie" but expressed interest in seeing what her scenes looked like. In 2010, Deadline Hollywood reported that Bassett would have a role in One Police Plaza. In 2011, Bassett co-starred with Samuel L. Jackson in the play The Mountaintop a fictionalized depiction of the night before the assassination of Martin Luther King Jr. (Jackson portrays MLK) while at the Lorraine Motel. The critically acclaimed play by Katori Hall originally debuted in London's West End in 2009 and went on to win the Laurence Olivier Award for Best New Play. The production opened on Broadway on October 13, 2011. In March 2011, it was reported that Bassett had signed up for a lead role in the ABC pilot Identity.

She also appeared in the 2011 film Jumping the Broom, playing the matriarch of a wealthy family. Bassett had a good feeling about the film from "the start", and believed her character had a "real presence" in the film and felt she was active in the plot. Bassett's and Loretta Devine's performances in the film were called "in some ways too fierce for the room, offering nuances of hostility and hurt that the movie cannot really handle" and contributing to the "unevenness of the performances" in the film. Bassett and Devine were noted as "superb, distinguished actresses" by Kirk Honeycutt of The Hollywood Reporter, but were seen as having been "asked to overdo every moment with permanent scowls and body language more suitable to Mortal Kombat." Despite this, her performance was given some positive attention, with Elizabeth Weitzman of New York Daily News saying Bassett "makes the movie hers". The film was Bassett's second time working with Devine, as the pair had worked together previously in Waiting to Exhale. Director Salim Akil said Bassett's presence quietly makes a big difference.

Bassett was featured in the 2012 film This Means War, having been known to be attached to the film since two years prior. Tambay A. Obenson of IndieWire attributed Bassett's lack of appearances in promotional material to her having a small role and her demographic not being targeted by the film. Bassett also appeared as herself in I Ain't Scared Of You.

Bassett portrayed Coretta Scott King in the television film Betty and Coretta, which aired on February 2, 2013, continuing her trend of portraying real women. Bassett had previously played Shabazz in both Malcolm X and Panther, but instead played Coretta Scott King opposite to Mary J. Blige, who played Shabazz. Bassett was surprised to learn after researching that Coretta initially refused Martin Luther King Jr.'s "advances" and called Mrs. King a "modern day iconic heroine." While being asked about what drew her to play real-life women, Bassett answered "The respect that I have for their lives—their stories, vulnerabilities, strength, and resolve." Bassett began filming her scenes during the latter part of the previous year. Mary J. Blige, when asked about what kind of experience it was to work with Bassett, said that she was "one of Angela's biggest fans" while calling her an "amazing woman." The film received mixed reviews, including negative reactions from Ilyasah Shabazz and Bernice King, the daughters of Betty Shabazz and Coretta Scott King.

Bassett appeared as Secret Service director Lynne Jacobs in the action thriller Olympus Has Fallen, released on March 22, 2013. Bassett was reported to have a role in the film in June 2012, the month before filming began. In an interview with The Huffington Post, Bassett noted that there had "never been a female head of the Secret Service, much less a woman of color". She called the decision to have a female African-American Secret Service director "a bold casting choice". Overall, Bassett viewed the film as authentic. Bassett described working with Morgan Freeman as wonderful, but she admitted to being intimidated by him. She was impressed with the preparation of director Antoine Fuqua, who she said "was just preparation to the hilt" and expressed her interest in working with him again. She appeared in the 2013 film Black Nativity. She sang and it was seen as contributing to the film's "blissful unreality". She was asked by the film's director, Kasi Lemmons, if she could sing and Bassett admitted to lying to get the role. She joked to reporter Jennifer H. Cunningham, "Yes, I can sing — you didn't ask how well!" Singing in a film was a new experience for Bassett, who had never had to sing before and had always lip-synced.

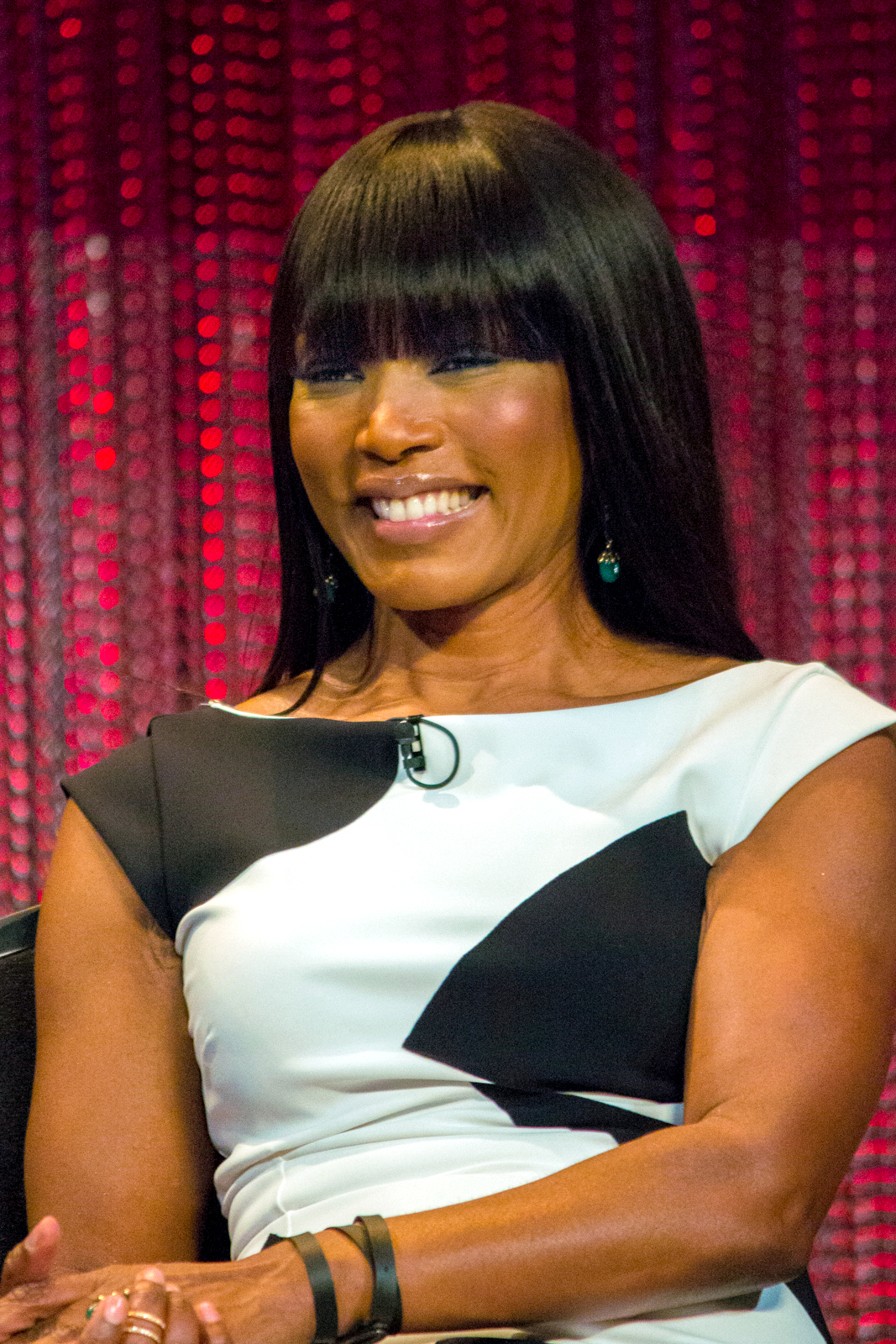
Bassett promoting American Horror Story: Coven at the 2014 PaleyFest

In 2013, Bassett appeared on FX TV show American Horror Story: Coven as Marie Laveau, a voodoo witch. Bassett praised the writers, calling them "amazing". Her agent approached Ryan Murphy about her having a role in the series and he told the agent that she was the person he had in mind for Marie Laveau. Bassett watched the previous seasons of the series before meeting with Murphy and found the writing "wonderful" and the characters "so realized". Bassett's performance earned her a nomination for the Primetime Emmy Award for Outstanding Supporting Actress in a Miniseries or a Movie. She returned to the show for its fourth season American Horror Story: Freak Show, playing Desiree Dupree, a three-breasted woman. She received another nomination for Outstanding Supporting Actress in a Miniseries or a Movie.

It was announced in May 2014 that Bassett would make her directorial debut with Whitney, a TV film based on the life of Whitney Houston, who Bassett had worked with previously. Bassett had previously expressed interest in directing the year before. It was announced in early June 2014 that Yaya DaCosta would play Houston in the film. Houston's daughter, Bobbi Kristina Brown, insulted Bassett on Twitter for not casting her as her mother in the film, to which Bassett admitted in an interview that she had never thought about casting Brown. On June 11, 2014, Ruby Dee died from natural causes. Bassett had previously worked with her on Betty and Coretta and was reported to attend the Riverside Church memorial for Dee on September 20, 2014.

In the 2015 film Survivor, Bassett portrayed United States Ambassador to the United Kingdom Maureen Crane. In a negative review of the film, Mark Kermode lamented Bassett "appears from behind closed doors like a celebrity guest on Stars in Their Eyes."

Bassett also voiced the character Six in the first-person shooter game, Tom Clancy's Rainbow Six Siege, as well as Ana Spanikopita in the Netflix series BoJack Horseman.

In March 2016, Bassett appeared in London Has Fallen, reprising her role as Lynne Jacobs. Bassett noted it was "the very first sequel I've ever done" and that she had been excited at the prospect of another film after the initial success of Olympus Has Fallen. In June 2016, the Human Rights Campaign released a video in tribute to the victims of the Orlando nightclub shooting; in the video, Bassett and others told the stories of the people killed there. Bassett appeared in American Horror Story: Roanoke. She also directed its sixth episode, which aired on October 19, 2016. The episode marks the third time a woman has directed the show. Co-creator Ryan Murphy praised Bassett in an interview with E! News, saying he told her she would "'do this big, big episode and you're going to knock it out of the park,' and she did. And I've seen it time and time again with these women that we brought into this directing world that they're just killing it, and they're working twice as hard because they know they have a lot to prove."

In March 2017, Bassett appeared in "Ache", an episode of the television series Underground. Executive producer and director Anthony Hemingway said her character "was written with Angela in mind" and that the entire cast came to see Bassett the day she filmed her performance. In May 2017, Bassett appeared in an episode of Master of None, portraying major character Denise's mother Catherine. Lena Waithe wanted Bassett after being impressed by her previous work though was convinced she would turn down the role and said Bassett's inclusion influenced the series drastically with "another layer" of tension. The writers of the series also favored Bassett for the role after seeing her performance in The Jacksons: An American Dream and related her character's evolution in that feature to Catherine.

In January 2018, Bassett joined the Fox first responder procedural drama 9–1–1, of which she is also an executive producer. She plays officer Athena Grant, wife to Robert Nash, and during the show's fifth season in 2022, the character made an appearance in an episode of its spin-off, 9-1-1: Lone Star.

In February 2018, Bassett starred in the acclaimed Marvel Cinematic Universe superhero film Black Panther as Queen Ramonda, mother of the titular character; she briefly reprised the role the following year in Avengers: Endgame. In July 2018, she portrayed CIA Director Erika Sloane in the action spy film Mission: Impossible – Fallout. In December 2018, she voiced the Decepticon villain 'Shatter' from the Transformers live-action film Bumblebee. In 2019, she joined the cast of Gunpowder Milkshake.

=== 2020s ===
Bassett provided the voice of Dorothea Williams in the Pixar animated film Soul, which was released on Disney+ on December 25, 2020. She also became narrator of the Magic Kingdom nighttime spectacular Disney Enchantment that premiered on October 1, 2021. In November 2022, she reprised her role as Ramonda in Black Panther: Wakanda Forever. Her performance in the sequel garnered her Best Supporting Actress awards at the 80th Golden Globe Awards—making her the first actor to win a major individual acting award for a film based on Marvel Comics—and at the 28th Critics' Choice Awards. She was also nominated for an Academy Award in the same category, which made her the first person in a Marvel Studios film to be nominated for an Academy Award in any acting category. She then appeared alongside Millie Bobby Brown in the Netflix film Damsel, released in March 2024 to mixed reviews. Bassett also starred as the President of the United States in Mission: Impossible – The Final Reckoning, released in May 2025.

== Media image ==
Bassett is widely regarded as one of the finest actresses of her generation. Bassett has portrayed real-life African-American women who are usually strong and intelligent. Bassett said in 2001 that she liked those roles and added: "That's the image that I like to put out there, and those are the parts I'm attracted to. But not iron-fist kind of strong, just self-assured. I'm nice too." She has turned down roles which she viewed as demeaning to her image. "This is a career about images. It's celluloid; they last for ever. I'm a black woman from America. My people were slaves in America, and even though we're free on paper and in law, I'm not going to allow you to enslave me on film, in celluloid, for all to see. And to cross the water, to countries where people will never meet people who look like me. So it becomes a bigger thing than me just becoming a movie star, and me just being on TV. So if you're going to show every black woman as 400lb or every black woman as the prostitute on the street ... But I have always maintained that [the roles] I cannot do because of the way I'm made up, or because of the way I think, I don't begrudge that there is someone else who has no issues with that."

In December 2022, Bassett was named as part of The Hollywood Reporter's Women in Entertainment Power 100. Time named her among its 2023 honorees for Women of the Year.

== Personal life ==
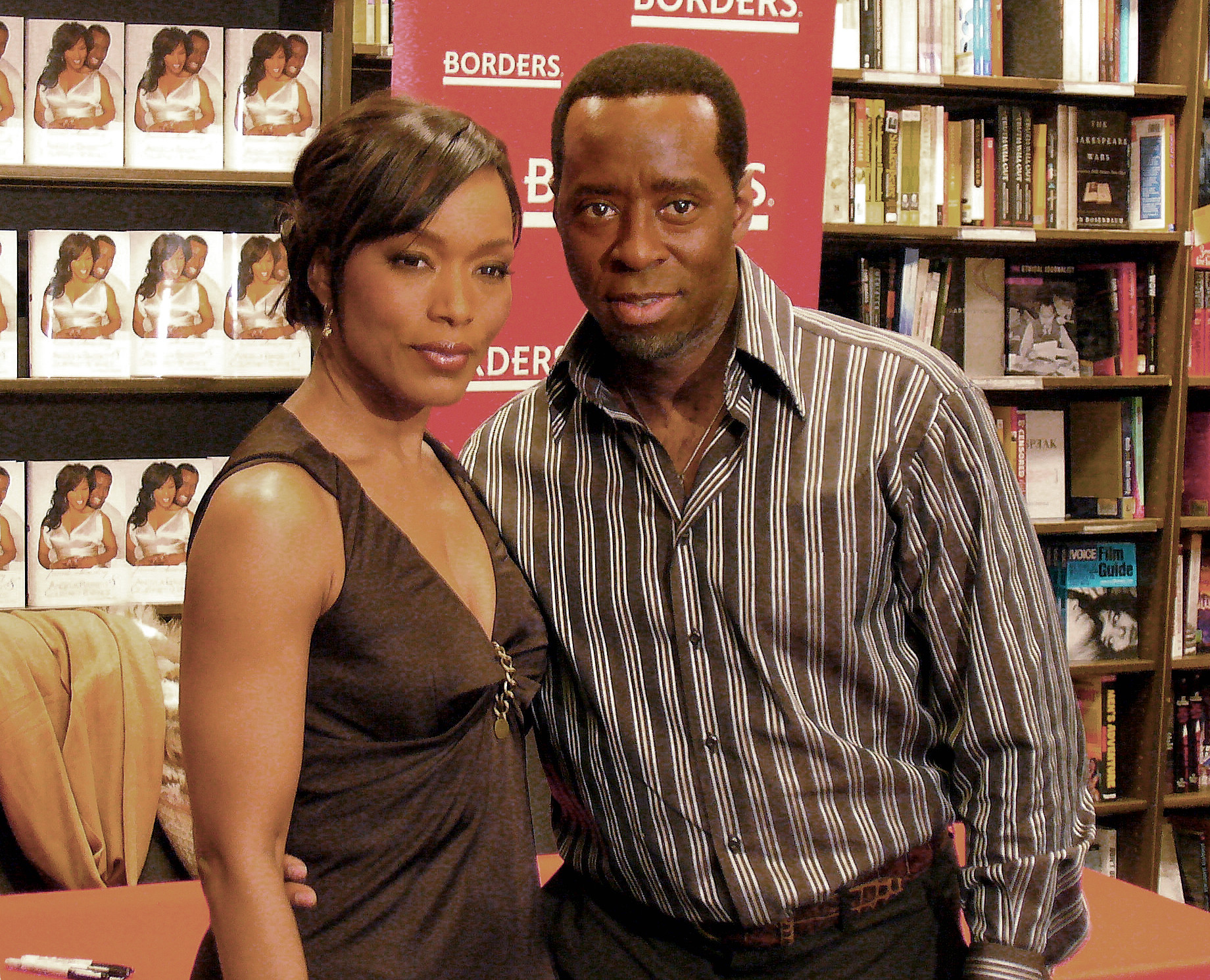
Bassett with her husband Courtney B. Vance in 2007

Bassett married actor Courtney B. Vance in 1997. They first met at Yale School of Drama, then became a couple over a decade later, when their paths crossed again in Los Angeles. In the summer of 2005, they starred together in a production of His Girl Friday at the Guthrie Theater in Minneapolis, Minnesota. The couple's twins were carried by a surrogate.

Bassett is a supporter of programs for the arts, especially for youth. She annually attends events for children with diabetes and those in foster homes. She is an active Ambassador of UNICEF for the United States and a member of the West Angeles Church of God in Christ. Bassett is a supporter of the Royal Theater Boys & Girls Club in her hometown of St. Petersburg, Florida.

She is represented by the Executive Speakers Bureau of Memphis, Tennessee.

In early 2007, Bassett donated $2,300 to the presidential primary campaign of Barack Obama. Bassett supported Obama in his re-election campaign. In June 2012, she made an appearance at the St. Petersburg office of his campaign and said the election was not one "where we can sit on the sidelines".

Bassett attended the second inauguration of Barack Obama on January 21, 2013. She endorsed Hillary Clinton for president during the 2016 United States presidential election, saying "Bar none, Clinton would make a great president." Bassett also spoke at the 2016 Democratic National Convention, introducing survivors of the previous year's Charleston church shooting, an incident about which she spoke during her remarks.

Bassett was initiated as an honorary member of Delta Sigma Theta sorority on July 13, 2013.

She is a Pentecostal Evangelical Christian and a member of the West Angeles Church of God in Christ (Church of God in Christ), located in Los Angeles.

== Awards and nominations ==
In 2018, she received a Doctorate of Fine Arts (honorary doctorate) from Yale University and a Doctorate of Humane Letters (honorary doctorate) from Old Dominion University in 2022.

Over the course of her career, Bassett has received multiple awards and nominations, including two Golden Globe Awards, an Actor Award (Outstanding Cast for Black Panther), two Critics' Choice Awards, as well as nominations for two Academy Awards, nine Emmy Awards and a BAFTA Award. Her Oscar nomination for Best Supporting Actress in Black Panther: Wakanda Forever (2022), marked the first time an actor was Oscar-nominated for a role in a Marvel film.

Bassett was awarded an Academy Honorary Award, also known as an honorary Oscar, at The Governors Awards presentation on January 9, 2024, recognizing her lifetime achievement in the film industry.

== See also ==
- List of people from Harlem
