= Betty & Coretta =

- Television release poster
- Written by: Shem Bitterman; Ron Hutchinson
- Directed by: Yves Simoneau
- Starring: Mary J. Blige; Angela Bassett; Malik Yoba; Lindsay Owen Pierre; Gloria Reuben; Cherise Boothe; Shinelle Azoroh
- Narrated by: Ruby Dee
- Country of origin: United States
- Original language: English

Production
- Producers: Polly Anthony; Mary J. Blige; Jaja Johnson; Larry Sanitsky
- Cinematography: Guy Dufaux
- Editor: Richard Comeau
- Running time: 88 minutes
- Production company: Sanitsky Company

Original release
- Network: Lifetime
- Release: February 2, 2013

Betty & Coretta is a 2013 American drama film directed by Yves Simoneau and written by Shem Bitterman and Ron Hutchinson. The film stars Mary J. Blige, Angela Bassett, Gloria Reuben, Malik Yoba, Tyler Hynes and Benz Antoine. The film premiered on Lifetime on February 2, 2013.

== Cast ==
- Mary J. Blige as Betty Shabazz
- Angela Bassett as Coretta Scott King
- Ruby Dee as Narrator
- Malik Yoba as Martin Luther King Jr.
- Lindsay Owen Pierre as Malcolm X
- Gloria Reuben as Myrlie Evers-Williams
- Cherise Boothe as Toni Wallace
- Shinelle Azoroh as QB
- Tyler Hynes as Mike Fitzpatrick
- Benz Antoine as Ralph Abernathy
- Nicki Whitely as Attalah
- Tristan D. Lalla as Jesse
- Alex C. Askew as Louis Farrakhan

== See also ==
- Civil rights movement in popular culture
