= How Stella Got Her Groove Back =

1998 American romantic comedy-drama film

- Theatrical release poster
- Directed by: Kevin Rodney Sullivan
- Screenplay by: Terry McMillan; Ron Bass
- Based on: How Stella Got Her Groove Back by Terry McMillan
- Produced by: Deborah Schindler
- Starring: Angela Bassett; Taye Diggs; Regina King; Whoopi Goldberg
- Cinematography: Jeffrey Jur
- Edited by: George Bowers
- Music by: Michel Colombier
- Production company: 20th Century Fox
- Distributed by: 20th Century Fox
- Release date: August 14, 1998
- Running time: 125 minutes
- Country: United States
- Language: English
- Budget: $20 million
- Box office: $39.2 million

How Stella Got Her Groove Back is a 1998 American romantic comedy-drama film directed by Kevin Rodney Sullivan, adapted from Terry McMillan's best-selling 1996 novel of the same title. The film stars Angela Bassett, Taye Diggs (in his film debut), Whoopi Goldberg, and Regina King. The original music score was composed by Michel Colombier.

== Plot ==
Stella Payne, a very successful 40-year-old stockbroker, is a single parent raising her 11-year-old son Quincy in Marin County, California. Her friends and family chastise her for being without a relationship for too long.

Stella sends Quincy to his father's for two weeks and then, seeing an ad for Jamaican vacations, spontaneously calls her best friend from college, Delilah Abraham in New York City, to propose a visit. Her friend persuades her to go on a first-class vacation to Montego Bay, Jamaica.

As Stella soaks in the beauty of the island on her first morning there, she encounters a handsome young islander at breakfast. Winston Shakespeare is a chef's assistant and twenty years her junior, but very interested in her. He suggests they meet later at the hotel's disco pajama party. Winston's pursuit of Stella turns into a blossoming romance that is abruptly interrupted when a chef hires him as an assistant, which prevents her from seeing him for the rest of her trip. On her return to California, she discovers that a merger with another company has phased out her job.

Winston convinces Stella to visit Jamaica again, which she does with Quincy and his cousin. Delilah gives her a supportive call. Stella is taken to meet Winston's mother, who shames her as they are only a year different in age. This, along with a call from Delilah's oncologist, forces her to take personal inventory of her life.

Stella flies to New York to be with the dying Delilah. When removing cancer from one part of her body, her surgeon found a metastasis in her liver. The two friends are able to spend some time together in the hospital room before Delilah dies. Winston comes to New York for the funeral and then flies with Stella and her companions to California.

Upon arriving home, Stella's family, and even her ex, welcome Winston. After a short while, tensions rise between him and Stella. He thinks that she is ashamed to be seen with him and he finds her controlling, and she grows annoyed with his immaturity and youthful taste. Winston surprises her by fixing up her carpentry workshop.

Stella's former brokerage calls to try to lure her back with the job offer of a vice-president's position and a $275,000 salary, which she turns down to try to fund her own firm. Amidst all her stress, Winston proposes. Stella temporizes and dithers over her decision. After a week without an answer, Winston announces that he intends to go back to Jamaica and enroll in medical school, and takes a taxi to the airport. Stella intercepts him in the terminal and says yes to his proposal, having realized the need for balance between love and companionship and her responsibilities as a mother.

== Cast ==
- Angela Bassett as Stella Payne
- Taye Diggs as Winston Shakespeare
- Whoopi Goldberg as Delilah Abraham
- Regina King as Vanessa
- Suzzanne Douglas as Angela
- Michael J. Pagan as Quincy Payne
- Sicily as Chantel
- Richard Lawson as Jack
- Barry Shabaka Henley as Buddy
- Lee Weaver as Nate
- Glynn Turman as Dr. Shakespeare
- Phyllis Yvonne Stickney as Mrs. Shakespeare
- Denise Hunt as Ms. Thang
- James Pickens Jr. as Walter Payne
- Carl Lumbly as Judge Spencer Boyle
- Victor Garber (uncredited) as Isaac

== Reception ==
Critical reception was mixed.

On Rotten Tomatoes, the film has an approval rating of 50% based on 50 reviews, with an average rating of 5.5/10. The website's critics consensus reads: "Angela Bassett gracefully breezes through a hot summer fling without much conflict or ado, leaving us wondering when -- or if -- she's ever getting that groove back." On Metacritic, the film has a score of 56 out of 100, based on reviews from 23 critics, indicating "mixed or average" reviews. Audiences surveyed by CinemaScore gave the film a grade A−.

=== Box office ===
In its opening weekend, Stella grossed $11,318,919, ranking #2 in the domestic box office behind Saving Private Ryan's fourth weekend. The film would go on to gross $36,672,941 domestically and an additional $1,605,781 overseas for a worldwide total of $39,278,722, from an estimated $20 million budget.

=== 25th anniversary ===
A panel with Angela Bassett and director Kevin Rodney Sullivan took place at the Tribeca Film Festival in June 2023. The two reflected on their experiences, offering insights into their acting and directorial decisions.

== Soundtrack ==
A soundtrack containing mostly R&B and reggae was released on August 11, 1998, by MCA Records. It peaked at number eight on the Billboard 200 and number three on the Top R&B/Hip-Hop Albums chart, and was certified gold on September 22, 1998.

== Accolades ==
1999 Acapulco Black Film Festival

- Best Actress – Angela Bassett (won)
- Best Actor – Taye Diggs (nominated)
- Best Actress – Whoopi Goldberg (won)
- Best Director – Kevin Rodney Sullivan (nominated)
- Best Film (won)
- Best Screenplay – Terry McMillan (nominated)
- Best Soundtrack (won)

1999 NAACP Image Awards

- Outstanding Lead Actress in a Motion Picture – Angela Bassett (won)
- Outstanding Motion Picture (won)
- Outstanding Supporting Actress in a Motion Picture – Whoopi Goldberg (won)
- Outstanding Youth Actor/Actress – Michael J. Pagan (won)
