= The Rosa Parks Story =

2002 American television movie

- DVD cover
- Based on: Montgomery bus boycott
- Written by: Paris Qualles
- Screenplay by: Paris Qualles
- Directed by: Julie Dash
- Starring: Angela Bassett; Peter Francis James; Cicely Tyson
- Music by: Joseph Conlon
- Country of origin: United States
- Original language: English

Production
- Producers: Pearl Devers; Elaine Eason Steele
- Editor: Wendy Hallam-Martin
- Running time: 94 minutes

Original release
- Network: CBS
- Release: February 24, 2002

The Rosa Parks Story is a 2002 American television movie written by Paris Qualles and directed by Julie Dash. Angela Bassett portrays Rosa Parks, with Cicely Tyson in a supporting role as her mother. It was broadcast by CBS on February 24, 2002. It received awards from the NAACP and the Black Reel Awards.

== Background and synopsis ==
The film is an account of the life of Mrs. Rosa Louise McCauley Parks and her actions in the civil rights movement. After she refused to give up her seat for a White man on a racially segregated bus after a long day at work, she was arrested. Her example and treatment prompted a bus boycott as a major civil rights demonstration in Montgomery, Alabama; it lasted 381 days from 1955 to 1956.

In the film, Parks's background is highlighted, and the issues in the segregated society of Alabama and the Deep South are indicated. As a child, Rosa was educated at a private school run by the Religious Society of Friends (Quakers), where she was encouraged to overcome the limits of segregation. In her late-adolescence, she married Raymond Parks, a barber and advocate of equal rights. She joins the local branch of the NAACP, although her husband believes that the organization has been ineffective in its battle against legalized racism. She worked as a seamstress in a department store.

On December 1, 1955, after a tiring day at work, Rosa Parks took a seat in the designated "colored" section of a city bus in Montgomery, Alabama. When the "White" section at the front filled up, the driver, James Blake, ordered Parks to relinquish her seat, as was the practice. She refused, and was arrested and jailed. Civil rights activists organized a one-day bus boycott the day of her trial (she was fined). With its success, they founded the Montgomery Improvement Association, and began a citywide bus boycott, led by a new local minister, Dr. Martin Luther King, Jr. The boycott lasted 381 days, made to work by African-American citizens, many of whom made sacrifices of time and energy to walk to work and other destinations. As they comprised the majority of bus passengers, the boycott greatly reduced the profits the bus company earned. Eventually, a ruling by the United States Supreme Court, in a related case, declared bus segregation unconstitutional. The boycott was important for mobilizing people in the civil rights movement both in the Deep South and on a nationwide basis across the United States.

In 1995, Rosa Parks was awarded the Presidential Medal of Freedom.

== Cast ==
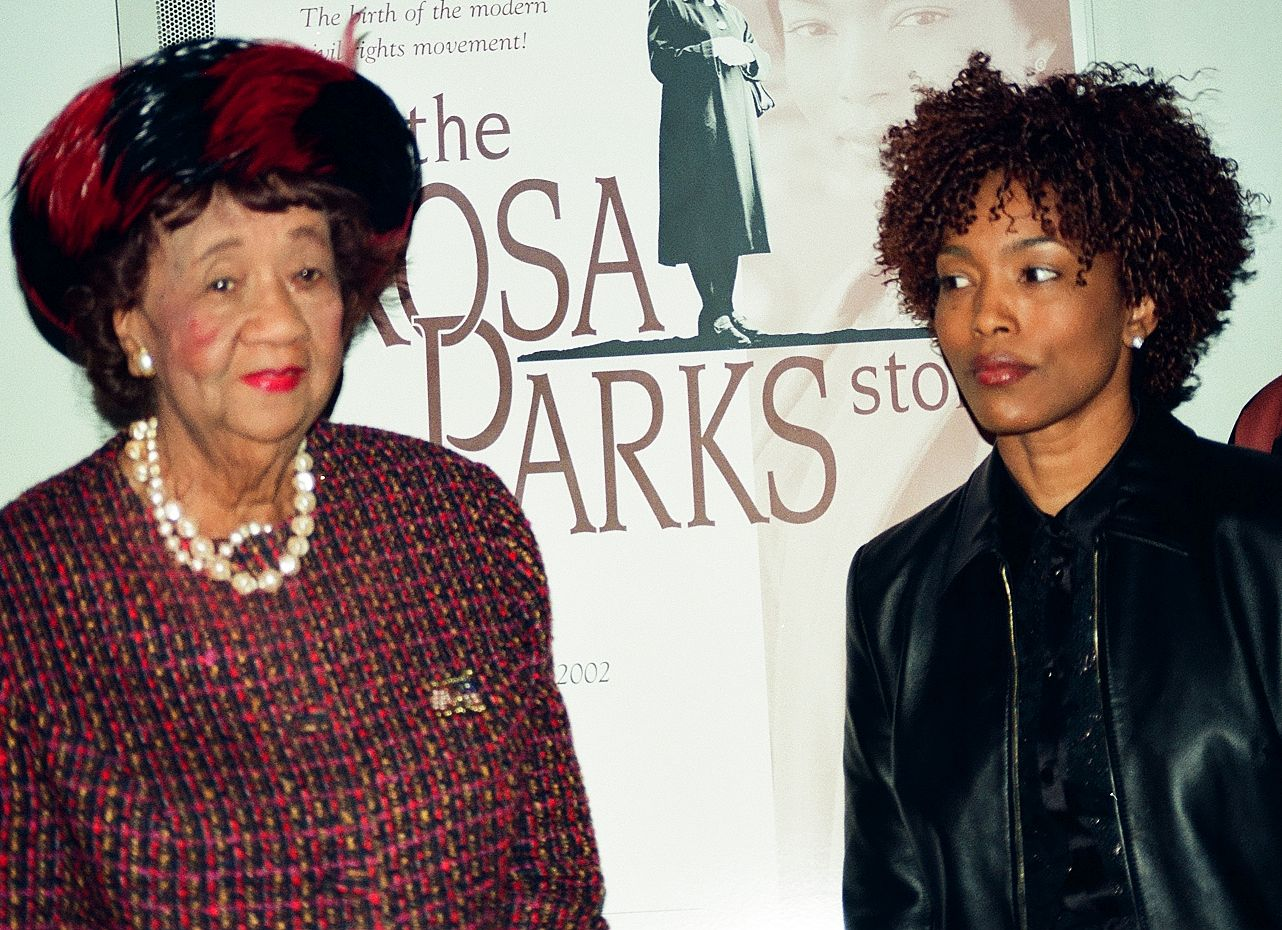
Dorothy Height and Angela Bassett

- Angela Bassett as Rosa Parks
- Peter Francis James as Raymond Parks
- Cicely Tyson as Leona McCauley, Rosa's mother.
- Dexter Scott King as Martin Luther King Jr.

== Awards ==
- The film was named the Best Television Movie in the NAACP Image Awards. Angela Bassett won the NAACP Image Award for Outstanding Actress in a Television Movie, Mini-Series or Dramatic Special for her performance.
- 2003, Black Reel Awards went to Bassett as Best Actress, Cicely Tyson as Best Supporting Actress, Paris Qualles for his teleplay, and the film as Best Network/Cable Film.
- It also won the Family Television Award and the New York Christopher Award.
- For the 55th Annual Directors Guild Awards, Julie Dash was nominated for her Outstanding Directorial Achievement on The Rosa Parks Story. She was the first African-American woman nominated in the category of "Primetime Movies Made for Television".

== See also ==
- Clifford Durr
- Civil rights movement in popular culture
