= Heritage Trail =

Heritage Trail may refer to one of the following specific heritage trails:

== Australia ==
- Canol Heritage Trail, Northwest Territories
- Golden Pipeline Heritage Trail, Western Australia
- Railway Reserves Heritage Trail, Western Australia
- Rosstown Railway Heritage Trail, Melbourne, Victoria
- Tops to Myall Heritage Trail, New South Wales

== Hong Kong ==
- Ping Shan Heritage Trail
- Tai Tam Waterworks Heritage Trail
- Wan Chai Heritage Trail

== United Kingdom ==
- Monmouth Heritage Trail, Wales
- South Telford Heritage Trail, Shropshire, England
- Steam Heritage Trail, Isle of Man
- Living Heritage City Trail, Stoke-on-Trent, England
- Valeways Millennium Heritage Trail, Wales

== United States ==
- Black Heritage Trail (disambiguation), multiple locations
- Boston Women's Heritage Trail, Massachusetts
- Cynwyd Heritage Trail, Pennsylvania
- Dahlgren Railroad Heritage Trail, Virginia
- Delta Heritage Trail State Park, Arkansas
- Florida Keys Overseas Heritage Trail, Florida
- Heritage Trail (Iowa), a multiuse rail trail
- Heritage Trail Correctional Facility, Indiana
- Iron Ore Heritage Trail, Michigan
- Lincoln Heritage Trail, in and around Illinois
- New Jersey Coastal Heritage Trail Route, New Jersey
- Orange Heritage Trailway, Orange County, New York
- Packers Heritage Trail, Green Bay Wisconsin
- Potomac Heritage Trail, in and around the District of Columbia
- Sacagawea Heritage Trail, Tri-Cities, Washington
- Three Rivers Heritage Trail, Pennsylvania
- Washington Heritage Trail, a byway in West Virginia
- Westmoreland Heritage Trail, Pennsylvania

== Elsewhere ==
- Alexander MacKenzie Heritage Trail, Canada
- Croagh Patrick Heritage Trail, Ireland
- Garapan Heritage Trail, Saipan
- Industrial Heritage Trail, Germany
- Jewish Heritage Trail in Białystok, Poland
- Maritime Heritage Trail – Battle of Saipan, Saipan
- Sandakan Heritage Trail, Malaysia
