= Speewah =

The Speewah is a mythical Australian station.

Speewa or Speewah may also refer to:

- Speewa, New South Wales
- Speewa, Victoria
- Speewah, Queensland
