= Bowleg Bill =

American fakelore folk hero

Bowleg Bill is an American fakelore folk hero, a Wyoming cowboy hand who went seafaring.

== Books ==
- Jeremiah Digges, Bowleg Bill, The Sea-Going Cowboy, Viking Press. NY. 1938. First edition ISBN 1121783597, ASIN B000ILSNLE
  - Also printed as Bowleg Bill, the sea-going cowboy;: Or, Ship ahoy & let 'er buck! ASIN B00086NDPK

The book is a compilation of tall tales about a cowboy born in Wyoming to become a sailor, never an able-bodied one, but with many adventures, including the luring of whales with his music, capturing a mermaid, mutineering.

- "The Strange Adventure of the Cowboy-Sailor" in a 1948 collection New England bean-pot; American folk stories to read and to tell. tells a story of Bowleg Bill meeting giant sea serpent and embark on a quest to find woman named Keziah.
- Harold W. Felton, Bowleg Bill, Seagoing Cowpuncher, Englewood Cliffs, New Jersey, Prentice-Hall, 1957. From review: " The exuberant chronicle of the exploits of Bowleg Bill, an eight-foot cowboy who rides herd on giant tuna fish and she-whales and he-whales, makes the most of two professions given to tall tales -- whaling and bronco-busting. The mixture of the jargon of the range and the poop-deck add to the incongruity of this beef-and-blubber comedy."
- Wyatt Blassingame, Bowleg Bill, Seagoing Cowboy, Garrard Publishing Company; 1st ed., 1976, ISBN 0811640442

== See also ==
- Pecos Bill
- Alfred Bulltop Stormalong
