= Pecos Bill =

Fictional cowboy

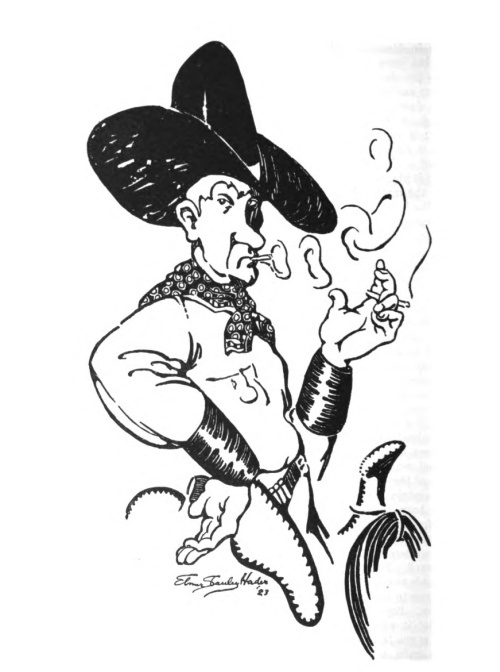
- Pecos Bill in The Century Magazine, October 1923, art by Elmer Hader
- First appearance: The Saga of Pecos Bill (1923)
- Created by: Edward S. O'Reilly
- Birthplace: Texas

In-universe information
- Full name: Pecos Bill
- Species: Human
- Gender: Male
- Occupation: Cowboy
- Significant other: Slue-Foot Sue
- Nationality: American

Pecos Bill (/ˈpeɪkəs/ PAY-kəs) is a fictional cowboy and folk hero in stories set during American westward expansion into the Southwest of Texas, New Mexico, Southern California, and Arizona. These narratives were invented as short stories by Tex O'Reilly in the early 20th century and are an example of American "fakelore". Pecos Bill was a late addition to the larger-than-life characters, such as Paul Bunyan or John Henry.

The origin story of the character depicts him as a feral child who was raised by a pack of coyotes. Years later, his long-lost brother convinces Bill that he is not a real coyote. In some tales concerning his final fate, Pecos and his love interest Slue-Foot Sue supposedly end up on the Moon, apparently never to return. In the animated film adaptation Melody Time, Sue alone is stranded on the Moon. A disheartened Bill then leaves civilization to rejoin the coyotes, who start howling at the Moon in honor of Bill's sorrow for Sue.

== History ==
The first known short story about Pecos Bill, titled The Saga of Pecos Bill, was written by Tex O'Reilly and published in The Century Magazine in October 1923. O'Reilly claimed they were part of an oral tradition of tales told by cowboys during the westward expansion and settlement of the southwest, including Texas, New Mexico, and Arizona. But American folklorists J. Frank Dobie and Richard M. Dorson found that O'Reilly invented the stories as "folklore", and that later writers either borrowed tales from O'Reilly, or added further adventures of their own invention to the cycle.

"Pecos Bill" was also the nickname of Civil War general William Shafter, although this was before O'Reilly created the legend. Shafter was considered a hero in Texas, and even had some legendary poetry written about how tough he was.

Before his prose debut, O'Reilly had already used the name Pecos Bill for bandit characters in short films on which he worked as both screenwriter and actor: West of the Rio Grande (1921), in which he portrayed Pecos Bill, and On the High Card (1921).

Between January and February of 1935, O'Reilly published Pecos Bill stories in Adventure Magazine.

According to legend, Pecos Bill is responsible for creating many landmarks. One landmark he is said to have created is the Gulf of Mexico. Apparently, there was a drought in Texas that was so horrible, that Pecos rushed to California and lassoed up a storm cloud and brought it to Texas. It rained so much that the Gulf of Mexico was created. Another story is of him creating the Rio Grande River. He and his horse got stranded in the desert and needed water. So Pecos grabbed a stick and dug the Rio Grande River. One other landmark that he is responsible for is the Painted Desert. He apparently started shooting at a tribe of Indigenous Americans, and as they ran away, the ritual paint they had on them came off and painted the desert.

== Description ==
According to the "legend", Pecos Bill was born in Texas in the 1830s (or 1845 in some versions, the year of Texas's statehood). Pecos Bill's family decided to move out because his town was becoming "too crowded." Pecos Bill was traveling in a covered wagon as an infant when he fell out unnoticed by the rest of his family near the Pecos River (thus his nickname). He was taken in and raised by a pack of coyotes. Years later he was found by his real brother, who managed to convince him he was not a coyote. Bill eventually decided to leave with his brother once he had accepted that he was a human. When they set off together, Bill rode atop a mountain lion he had tamed.

He grew up to become a cowboy. Bill used a rattlesnake named Shake as a lasso and another snake as a little whip. His horse, Widow-Maker (also called Lightning), was so named because he was Texas's first and most notorious serial killer, leaving a trail of dead bodies clear across Texas (this is another version of how the Rio Grande was made). Dynamite was said to be his favorite food. On one of his adventures, Pecos Bill managed to lasso a twister. It was also said that he once wrestled the Bear Lake Monster for several days until Bill finally defeated it.

Pecos Bill had a sweetheart named Slue-Foot Sue, who rode a giant catfish down the Rio Grande. He was fishing with the pack when he saw her. Shake, Widow-Maker, and Slue-Foot Sue are as idealized as Pecos Bill.

After a courtship in which, among other things, Pecos Bill shoots all the stars from the sky except for one which becomes the Lone Star, Bill proposes to Sue. She insists on riding Widow-Maker before, during or after the wedding (depending on variations in the story). Widow-Maker, jealous of no longer having Bill's undivided attention, bounces Sue off; she lands on her bustle and begins bouncing higher and higher. Bill catches her, but then gets pulled with her. The town folks assumed both Bill and Sue were bounced away to another place or both ended up on the Moon where they stayed and were never seen again.

In James Cloyd Bowman's version of the story, Sue eventually recovers from the bouncing, but is so traumatized by the experience she never speaks to Pecos Bill ever again.

In a few other versions, Bill attempts, but fails, to lasso her, because of an interference by Widow-Maker who did not want her on his back again (or for that matter didn't want her coming between his and Bill's friendship), and she eventually hits her head on the Moon. After she has been bouncing for days, Pecos Bill realizes that she would eventually starve to death, so he lassos her with Shake the rattlesnake and brings her back down to Earth. Widow-Maker, realizing that what he did to her was wrong, apologizes and is forgiven.

In other versions, Sue could not stop bouncing, and Bill could not stop her from bouncing either, so Bill had to shoot her to put her out of her misery. Though it is said that Bill was married many times, he never loved the others as much as Sue, and the other relationships did not work out.

In the story The Death of Pecos Bill, Pecos Bill is in a bar when a so-called city boy walks in with gator-skin shoes and a gator-skin suit, otherwise trying to present himself in the manner of an outlaw cowboy. Pecos Bill found it amusing and laughed himself to death outside.

In the Melody Time version, Bill was apparently responsible for the California Gold Rush and M.F. Stephenson's famous "There's gold in them thar hills" phrase. He knocked out the gold fillings of a gang of rustlers when they tried to steal his cow, scattering the fillings across the landscape. Bill also creates the Lone Star long before he meets Sue. Additionally, in this version Sue gets stranded on the Moon due to Widow-Maker's interference in preventing Bill from lassoing her, after which a disheartened Bill leaves civilization to rejoin the coyotes, who now howl at the Moon in honor of Bill's sorrow for Sue.

In the more popular versions, including many children's books, Bill and Sue reunite, and get married happily ever after.

In a school story book (leveled reader), Bill finds a tornado and lassos it, and then they reunite.

== Appearances ==
=== Comics ===
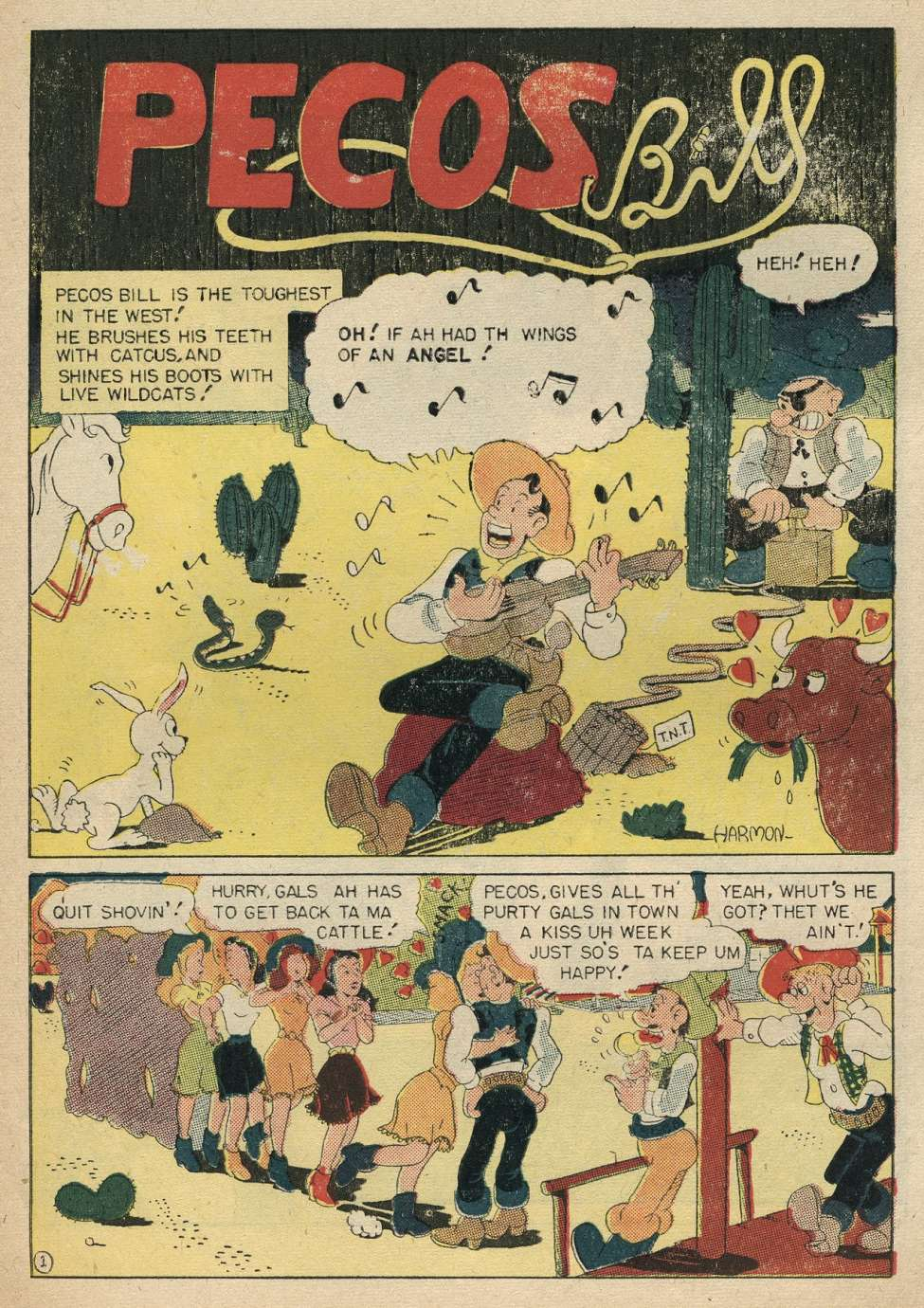
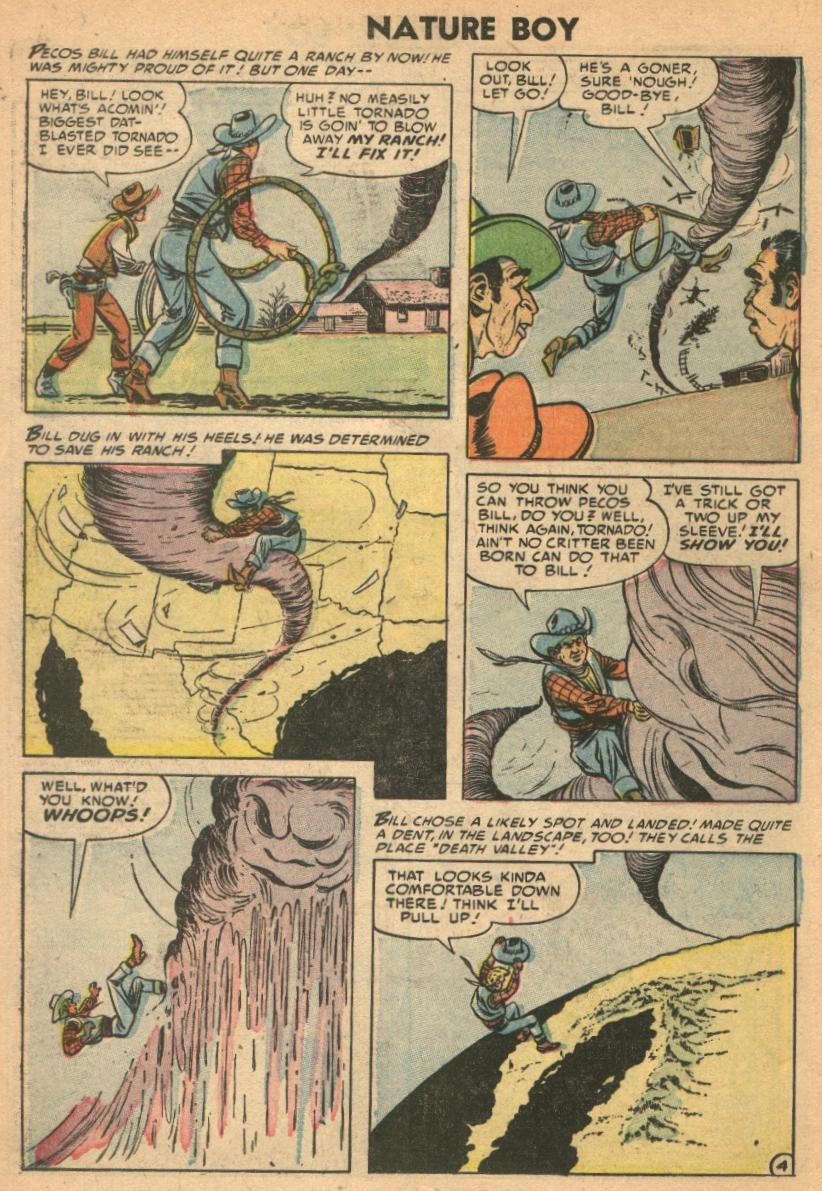
Tim McCoy Comics #16 (October 1948), art by Clint Harmon and Nature Boy #4 (August 1956), art by Bob Powell

Edward O'Reilly co-authored a comic strip with cartoonist Jack A. Warren, also known as Alonzo Vincent Warren, distributed by George Matthew Adams Service between 1936 and 1937. When O'Reilly died in 1946, Warren began a strip titled Pecos Pete. This was a story about "Pecos Bill", who had received a "lump on the naggan" that caused him amnesia. The cartoons originally were published in The Sun and were later syndicated.

Between 1948 and 1951, Clint Harmon created his own version of Pecos Bill for Charlton Comics, appearing in titles such Tim McCoy and Cowboy Western Comics. In Nature Boy #4 (August 1956), was published an adaptation by Bob Powell.

In 1949, the Italian publisher Mondadori launched the comic series Pecos Bill, written by Guido Martina and illustrated by Raffaele Paparella, Antonio Canale, Pier Lorenzo De Vita, Roy D'Ami, Francesco Gamba, Gino d'Antonio and Dino Battaglia. After its conclusion in 1955, the series was re-proposed several times by other publishers in other series created by different authors: in 1956 the Alpe publishing house created a new series, Le nuove avventure di Pecos Bill, with a different interpretation of the character created by Cesare Solini and drawn by Pietro Gamba. In 1960 Mondadori revived the character by re-proposing the stories already presented in the Albi d'Oro series in the series Gli albi di Pecos Bill, and then sold it in 1962 to the publisher Fasani who continued publishing it for over three hundred issues of newly created stories until 1967, in 1978 the publisher Bianconi debuted a new version of the character created by Armando Bonato. In Italy the reprints of the stories have been re-proposed several times by various publishers over the years.

=== Films ===
Pecos Bill made the leap to film in the 1948 Walt Disney animated feature Melody Time.

- Melody Time in 1948, Pecos Bill was the final segment of this Disney animated anthology film. This version of the story serves to explain why coyotes howl at the Moon.
- In the 1975 Italian/Spanish film Whisky e fantasmi, José Luis Ayestarán plays the ghost of Pecos BIll.
- In the 1995 Disney film Tall Tale: The Unbelievable Adventures of Pecos Bill portrayed by Patrick Swayze. Sue does not figure in the film; however, her fatal "bouncing to the Moon" story is briefly narrated by Patrick Swayze's Bill, with Sue substituted by a man named Lanky Hank.
- Elmo played Pecos Bill in his pet goldfish Dorothy's imagination in Sesame Street Special 2001 direct-to-video, Elmo's World: The Wild, Wild West, where he tamed a bucking bronco, rode a twister, and lassoed the Sun, creating the sunset.

=== Television ===
- Pecos Bill appeared in a 1985 episode of Tall Tales & Legends was played by Steve Guttenberg and Slue-Foot Sue is played by Rebecca De Mornay.
- Pecos Bill appears in the PBS puppet television show Between the Lions, where he lassos a tornado.
- Pecos Bill and Slue-Foot Sue appear in the Humility episode of the animated series Adventures from the Book of Virtues

=== Miscellaneous ===
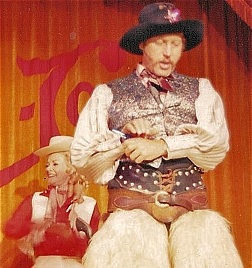
Wally Boag as Pecos Bill at Disneyland in the 1970s

- Travis Tritt sings the story of the legendary cowboy.
- Comedian Robin Williams recorded a children's audiobook version of the story, with music by Ry Cooder, for Rabbit Ears/Windham Hill, in 1988.
- Pecos Bill appeared in the children's book The Great Texas Hamster Drive by Eric A. Kimmel.
- Harold W. Felton authored three books of Pecos Bill tall tales.
- Slue-Foot Sue is the heroine of Laura Frankos' short story "Slue-Foot Sue and the Witch in the Woods" (1998), in the comedy-fantasy anthology Did You Say Chicks?! She bustle-ride deposits her in Russia, where she must fight a duel with Baba Yaga.

== See also ==
- Mowgli, a boy who is raised by wolves in The Jungle Book by Rudyard Kipling
- Tarzan, a man who was raised by apes in the book series created by Edgar Rice Burroughs
- "Who Do You Love?" (Bo Diddley song)
- Baron Munchausen

Other "Big Men"

- Big Joe Mufferaw, a.k.a. Jos. Montferrand of the Ottawa Valley
- Gargantua
- Paul Bunyan
- Iron John of Michigan
- John Henry
- Johnny Kaw
- Mike Fink
- Hiawatha
- Joe Magarac
- Fionn mac Cumhaill
- Davy Crockett
- Venture Smith, the black Paul Bunyan
- Bill Brasky
- Alfred Bulltop Stormalong
- Buffalo Bill
- Wild Bill Hickok
- Wyatt Earp
- Crooked Mick of the Speewah
- Tom Hickathrift
