= Kemp Morgan =

American folklore character

Kemp Morgan or Gib Morgan is a character from American folklore, particularly appearing in tall tales.

Kemp Morgan stories are said to have appeared in the oil fields of Texas and Oklahoma, where he was a folk hero similar to Paul Bunyan or John Henry. Morgan was said to be a rotary oil driller with an amazing power of olfaction, allowing him to smell oil underground, and the strength to hand-build a drilling platform covering four acres at the base, and so tall "it had to be hinged in two places to let the moon go by".

Morgan is possibly a creation of fakelore, rather than a genuine folk hero. In 1945, Texas folklorist Mody Coggin Boatright published a full-length analysis, Gib Morgan: Minstrel of the Oil Fields, which linked the collected tales with a consistent pattern of biographical and historical details, and then to "a man of flesh and blood": the real Gilbert Morgan (1842–1909), born in Callensburg, Pennsylvania, veteran of the American Civil War, and at work in the old fields for more than 20 years.
