= Invented tradition =

Recently invented cultural practices perceived as old

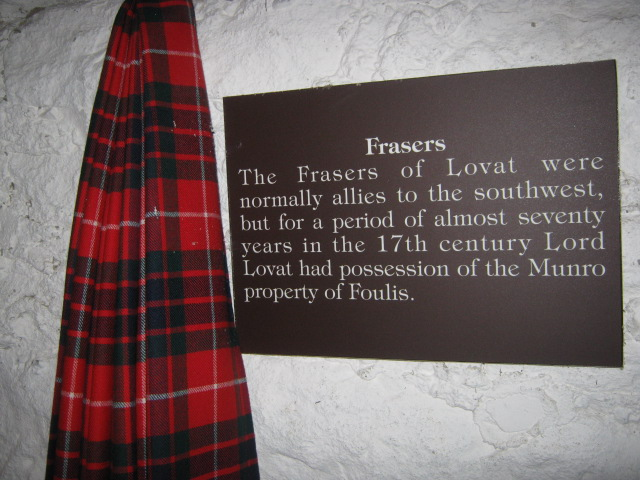
"Ancient" Scottish clan tartans are an example of an invented tradition created in the 19th century.

Invented traditions are cultural practices that are presented or perceived as traditional, arising from people starting in the distant past, but which are relatively recent and often consciously invented by historical actors. The concept was highlighted in the 1983 book The Invention of Tradition, edited by Eric Hobsbawm and Terence Ranger. Hobsbawm's introduction argues that many "traditions" which "appear or claim to be old are often quite recent in origin and sometimes invented." This "invention" is distinguished from "starting" or "initiating" a tradition that does not then claim to be old. The phenomenon is particularly clear in the modern development of the nation and of nationalism, creating a national identity promoting national unity, and legitimising certain institutions or cultural practices.

== Background ==
A set of practices, typically ritualistic or symbolic, aims to instill values and behavioral norms through repetition, such as saluting a flag before class. These practices attempt to create a bridge between an uncertain present and an idealized image of the past—an image often as much a creation as the tradition associated with it. Though these "invented traditions" appear to be genuine, rooted in historical images and symbols (whether real or imagined), they are actually of relatively recent origin and deliberately constructed. British historian Eric Hobsbawm, along with Terence Ranger, explored this phenomenon in their edited collection The Invention of Tradition (1983). Hobsbawm argues that invented traditions serve three main purposes: they foster social cohesion, legitimize institutions and authority structures, and solidify value systems and beliefs. Ronald L. Baker comments that Hobspawm's notion of an invented tradition may be in some ways a polite phrasing of Richard M. Dorson's fakelore, a pejorative.

== Application of the term and paradox ==
The concept has been applied to cultural phenomena such as neo-Druidism in Britain, neopaganism in general, tartanry in Scotland, the traditions of major religions, some Korean martial arts such as Taekwondo, and some Japanese martial arts, such as judo. It has influenced related concepts such as Benedict Anderson's imagined communities and the pizza effect.

Indeed, the sharp distinction between "tradition" and "modernity" is often itself invented. The concept is "highly relevant to that comparatively recent historical innovation, the 'nation', with its associated phenomena: nationalism, the nation-state, national symbols, histories, and the rest." Hobsbawm and Ranger remark on the "curious but understandable paradox: modern nations and all their impedimenta generally claim to be the opposite of novel, namely rooted in remotest antiquity, and the opposite of constructed, namely human communities so 'natural' as to require no definition other than self-assertion." The concept of authenticity is also often questionable.

== Pseudo-folklore ==
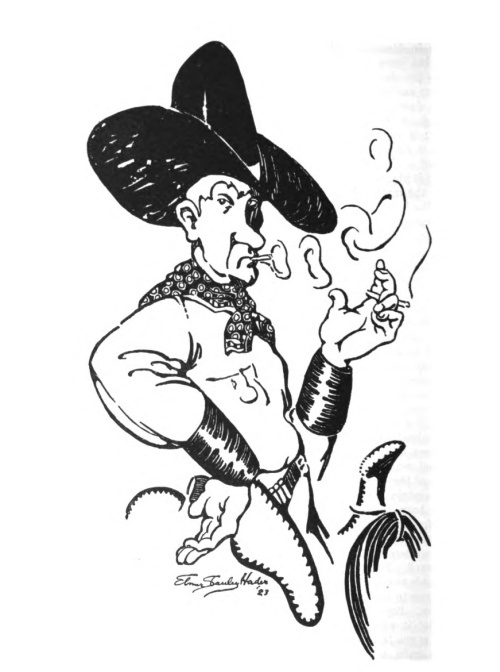
Pecos Bill

Paul Bunyan

Pseudo-folklore or fakelore is lore (or activities, documents, etc) falsely presented as if it were genuinely traditional. The term can refer to new stories or songs made up, or to folklore that is reworked and modified for modern tastes. The element of misrepresentation is central; artists who draw on traditional stories in their work are not producing fakelore unless they claim that their creations are real folklore. Over the last decades the term has generally fallen out of favor in folklore studies because it places an emphasis on origin instead of practice to determine authenticity.

The term fakelore was coined in 1950 by American folklorist Richard M. Dorson in his article "Folklore and Fake Lore" published in The American Mercury. Dorson's examples included the fictional cowboy, Pecos Bill, who was presented as a folk hero of the American West but was actually invented by the writer Edward S. O'Reilly in 1923. Dorson also regarded the giant lumberjack Paul Bunyan as fakelore. Although Bunyan originated as a character in traditional tales told by loggers in the Great Lakes region of North America, William B. Laughead (1882–1958), an ad writer working for the Red River Lumber Company, invented many of the stories about him that are known today. According to Dorson, advertisers and popularizers turned Bunyan into a "pseudo folk hero of twentieth-century mass culture" who bore little resemblance to the original.

Folklorismus also refers to the invention or adaptation of folklore. Unlike fakelore, however, folklorismus is not necessarily misleading; it includes any use of a tradition outside the cultural context in which it was created. The term was first used in the early 1960s by German scholars, who were primarily interested in the use of folklore by the tourism industry. However, professional art based on folklore, TV commercials with fairy tale characters, and even academic studies of folklore are all forms of folklorism.

=== Connection to folklore ===
The term fakelore is often used by those who seek to expose or debunk modern reworkings of folklore, including Dorson himself, who spoke of a "battle against fakelore". Dorson complained that popularizers had sentimentalized folklore, stereotyping the people who created it as quaint and whimsical – whereas the real thing was often "repetitive, clumsy, meaningless and obscene". He contrasted the genuine Paul Bunyan tales, which had been so full of technical logging terms that outsiders would find parts of them difficult to understand, with the commercialized versions, which sounded more like children's books. The original Paul Bunyan had been shrewd and sometimes ignoble; one story told how he cheated his men out of their pay. Mass culture provided a sanitized Bunyan with a "spirit of gargantuan whimsy [that] reflects no actual mood of lumberjacks". Daniel G. Hoffman said that Bunyan, a folk hero, had been turned into a mouthpiece for capitalists: "This is an example of the way in which a traditional symbol has been used to manipulate the minds of people who had nothing to do with its creation."

Others have argued that professionally created art and folklore are constantly influencing each other and that this mutual influence should be studied rather than condemned. For example, Jon Olson, a professor of anthropology, reported that while growing up he heard Paul Bunyan stories that had originated as lumber company advertising. Dorson had seen the effect of print sources on orally transmitted Paul Bunyan stories as a form of cross-contamination that "hopelessly muddied the lore". For Olson, however, "the point is that I personally was exposed to Paul Bunyan in the genre of a living oral tradition, not of lumberjacks (of which there are precious few remaining), but of the present people of the area." What was fakelore had become folklore again.

Responding to his opponents' argument that the writers have the same claim as the original folk storytellers, Dorson writes that the difference amounts to the difference between traditional culture and mass culture.

=== Examples of fakelore ===
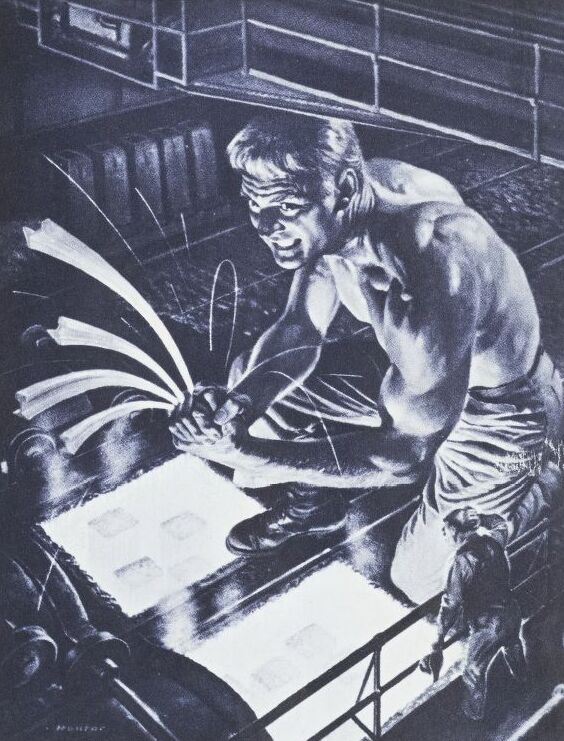
Joe Magarac

In addition to Paul Bunyan and Pecos Bill, Dorson identified the American folk hero Joe Magarac as fakelore. Magarac, a fictional steelworker, first appeared in 1931 in a Scribner's Magazine story by the writer Owen Francis. He was a literal man of steel who made rails from molten metal with his bare hands; he refused an opportunity to marry to devote himself to working 24 hours a day, worked so hard that the mill had to shut down, and finally, in despair at enforced idleness, melted himself down in the mill's furnace to improve the quality of the steel. Francis said he heard this story from Croatian immigrant steelworkers in Pittsburgh, Pennsylvania; he reported that they told him the word magarac was a compliment, then laughed and talked to each other in their own language, which he did not speak. The word actually means "donkey" in Croatian, and is an insult. Since no trace of the existence of Joe Magarac stories prior to 1931 has been discovered, Francis's informants may have made the character up as a joke on him. In 1998, Gilley and Burnett reported "only tentative signs that the Magarac story has truly made a substantive transformation from 'fake-' into 'folklore'", but noted his importance as a local cultural icon.

Other American folk heroes that have been called fakelore include Old Stormalong, Febold Feboldson, Big Mose, Tony Beaver, Bowleg Bill, Whiskey Jack, Annie Christmas, Cordwood Pete, Antonine Barada, and Kemp Morgan. Marshall Fishwick describes these largely literary figures as imitations of Paul Bunyan. Additionally, scholar Michael I. Niman describes the Legend of the Rainbow Warriors – a belief that a "new tribe" will inherit the ways of the Native Americans and save the planet – as an example of fakelore.

== Criticism ==
One reviewer, Peter Burke, stated that the "'invention of tradition' is a splendidly subversive phrase", but it "hides serious ambiguities". Hobsbawm "contrasts invented traditions with what he calls 'the strength and adaptability of genuine traditions'. But where does his 'adaptability', or his colleague Ranger's 'flexibility' end, and invention begin? Given that all traditions change, is it possible or useful to attempt to discriminate the 'genuine' antiques from the fakes?". Another also praised the high quality of the articles but had qualifications. "Such distinctions" (between invented and authentic traditions) "resolve themselves ultimately into one between the genuine and the spurious, a distinction that may be untenable because all traditions (like all symbolic phenomena) are humanly created ('spurious') rather than naturally given ('genuine')." Pointing out that "invention entails assemblage, supplementation, and rearrangement of cultural practices so that in effect traditions can be preserved, invented, and reconstructed", Guy Beiner proposed that a more accurate term would be "reinvention of tradition", signifying "a creative process involving renewal, reinterpretation and revision".

== See also ==
- False etymology
- Folklorismus
- Hoax
- Imagined community
- Metamodernism
- Mythopoeia
- Neotraditionalism (politics)
- Oera Linda Book
- Old wives' tale
- Pseudohistory
- Pseudo-mythology
- State nationalism
- Tourist trap
- Urban legend
