= The Speewah =

The Speewah is a mythical Australian station that is the subject of many tall tales told by Australian bushmen. The stories of the Speewah are Australian folktales in the oral tradition. The Speewah is synonymous with hyperbole as many of the tales about the place are used to enhance the storytellers' masculinity by relating events of extreme hardship and overcoming the dangers of the Australian wilderness.

Typically men talk of the Speewah when they are faced with hard labour as a means of making their jobs mentally easier, though it can also be seen as a way of legitimising their bragging. Speech of this sort is used to make light of the situation or to re-affirm the speakers' masculinity or bush skills to the detriment of others.

The Speewah station in The Kimberleys, Western Australia, is considered by some to be the original Speewah of legend, but may merely have been named after the legend in homage. The property is listed by the Australian Government as being located at 16.26°S 127.57°E. The town of Speewah is located west of Cairns on the Kennedy Highway and is considered to be named after the legend.

== Location in legend ==
The Speewah is an imaginary land and its boundaries have never been defined: the Speewah can be anywhere that the storyteller wants it to be, and tales have it situated anywhere from Cape York to the Otways, from Brisbane to Broome – anywhere in Australia. Its location is kept ambiguous and when questioned people from different regions of Australia will give a different answer. 'The men from the Darling Ranges said it was back o' Bourke and the men of Bourke said it was out West and the men of the West pointed to Queensland and in Queensland they told you the Speewah was in the Kimberleys.'

At any rate the territory itself is supposedly very large. When one wanted to close the gate to the station he had to take a week's rations with him, and a jackeroo who was sent to bring the cows in from the horse paddock was said to be gone for six months, not due to incompetence (for there are no incompetent workers on the Speewah) but simply due to the sheer size of the Speewah. When the cook was frying up bacon and eggs for the men, he needed a motorbike to get around the frying pan. The dust storms were so thick that the rabbits dug warrens in them. The boundary riders had to make sure that their watches were changed for each separate time zone.

== Locations adopting the name ==
A portion of land owned by Jim Dillon south-west of Wyndham, Western Australia that was settled at the beginning of the 20th century was named after the mythical land of the Speewah. This property (or station) still appears on maps as 'The Speewah' and has caused much debate from the storytelling community as to whether or not this is the original Speewah of legend or whether (which is more likely) it is merely named after the legend in homage. This property is listed by the Australian Government as being 16°26′S 127°57′E.

There is a "Speewa" straddling the border of Victoria and New South Wales near 35°13′S 143°30′E. The Speewa Ferry across the Murray River links Speewa, Victoria with Speewa, New South Wales.

There is a hidden, private "Speewah" in the south west of Western Australia that has its roots in the original "Speewah" in the Kimberleys.

Speewah is also a real place in Far North Queensland. It is about 10 kilometres west of Cairns – a few kilometres south of the tourist town of Kuranda. It could be described as a bushland residential area.

== Crooked Mick ==
Crooked Mick is a larger-than-life character from Australian oral tradition, emerging during the era of the swagmen, and sheep shearing. A sort of Australian analogue to Paul Bunyan, he is always associated with the Speewah; only appearing in stories set in the Speewah.

Crooked Mick, like his American Wild West counterparts, is a giant of a man and skilled in many trades. Equally hard-working and playful, he is quick-witted and has an appetite to match his unusual size. Crooked Mick is regarded as the quintessential bushman. Nothing was beyond him; he was said to have been capable of a number of impossible or difficult feats (for example, lifting huge weights, shearing a large number of sheep in a short period of time, baking pies so light that a gust of wind would carry them, kicking crocodiles up to the moon, and moving mountains).

The reason behind the "Crooked" in his name, while always a physical feature, varied from story to story, with explanations including having one eye higher than the other, a twisted nose due to a crocodile attack, or misshapen teeth (due to a habit of biting the skin of the sheep he ate). Most commonly, however, it was due to possessing a "crooked" walk: a limp from being ringbarked when he was a teenager or a bent leg from an incident with a water trough.

Crooked Mick's vital status varies based on storyteller; a common format followed when telling stories about Crooked Mick is for the teller to describe several conflicting explanations for Crooked Mick's death and then provide the "real" story.
