= Beveridge Island =

Beveridge Island may refer to:

- Beveridge Island (Victoria), Australia
- Beveridge Island (Nunavut), Canada
