= Harold Felton =

American writer and folklorist

Harold William Felton (April 1, 1902 – July 12, 1991) was an American writer and folklorist, an author of many children's books and books of American tall tales, among others.

Felton was born in Neola, Iowa. After one year at Creighton University in Omaha, Nebraska, he transferred to the University of Nebraska to earn the Bachelor of Arts degree in 1925 and a law degree in 1928.

After graduation, Felton practiced law in Omaha for 5 years and then worked at the Internal Revenue Service until retirement (1933–1970). On 23 August 1933 he married Hildegard (Helen) Kessler. Later the Felton's moved to Manhattan, New York City.

== Books ==
- Bowleg Bill; Seagoing Cowpuncher. Englewood Cliffs, New Jersey, Prentice-Hall, 1957.
- (With Edward S. Breck) Cowboy Jamboree: Western Songs and Lore. New York, Knopf, 1951.
- Fire Fightin' Mose. New York, Knopf, 1955.
  - Big Mose, Hero Fireman, 1969
- John Henry and His Hammer. New York, Knopf, [c1950].
- Legends of Paul Bunyan. New York, A. A. Knopf, 1947. (with Foreword by Richard Bennett)
- Lemuel Haynes. Falls Village, CT, Falls Village-Canaan Historical Society, 1989.
- Mike Fink, Best of the Keelboatmen. New York, Dodd, Mead, [1960].
- True Tall Tales of Stormalong: Sailor of the Seven Seas, 1968
- New Tall Tales of Pecos Bill. Englewood Cliffs, NJ, Prentice-Hall, [1958].
- Pecos Bill, Texas Cowpuncher. New York, Knopf, [c1949].
- Pecos Bill and the Mustang, 1965
- Uriah Phillips Levy. New York, Dodd, Mead, [c1978].
- (With Ed Grant) The World's Most Truthful Man; Tales Told by Ed Grant in Maine. New York, Dodd, Mead, [c1961].
- Nancy Ward, Cherokee
- Ely S. Parker, spokesman for the Senecas
- Canaan: A small New England town during the American Revolutionary War
- Gib Morgan, oil driller
- James Weldon Johnson
- Mumbet: The Story of Elizabeth Freeman
- Deborah Sampson: Soldier of the Revolution
- Jim Beckwourth, Negro mountain man
- Sergeant O'Keefe and his mule Balaam
- Edward Rose; Negro trail blazer
- William Phips and the treasure Ship
- A Horse Named Justin Morgan
