= Living Heritage City Trail, Stoke-on-Trent =

The Living Heritage City Trail is a heritage trail in Stoke-on-Trent, Staffordshire, England.

The project was unveiled in 2023. It is funded by UK Shared Prosperity Fund, and supported by Arts Council England.

Markers located along the trail were designed and developed by Neil Brownsword, professor of ceramics at the University of Staffordshire. They are bronze casts of ceramic pieces, on steel plinths. Professor Brownsword said that the markers "draw attention to former factories, once-prominent potters now faded into obscurity, and the industrial hubs where essential materials shaped the landscape we know today."

The trail was launched in May 2026. Steve Watkins, Lord Mayor of Stoke-on-Trent, said: “Projects like this remind us how much history surrounds us in everyday life – often in places we walk past without a second thought".

The trail takes about an hour on foot. An app has also been available since early 2026 to view the trail and markers.

The markers are located at:

- Church Street, Stoke
- Kingsway, Stoke
- University of Staffordshire, College Road, Shelton
- Cauldon Park, College Road, Shelton
- Lawrence Street, Shelton
- Fletcher Street, Shelton
- City Central Library, Hanley
- Potteries Museum & Art Gallery
