= Pecos Bill (comics) =

Western comic book series

Publication information
- Publisher: Mondadori
- Publication date: 1949-1955

Creative team
- Written by: Guido Martina
- Artist(s): Raffaele Paparella, Antonio Canale, Pier Lorenzo De Vita, Rinaldo D’Ami, Francesco Gamba, Gino D’Antonio, and Dino Battaglia

Pecos Bill is an Italian comic book series created by Guido Martina and Raffaele Paparella. The name is a reference to American folklore character Pecos Bill.

== Background ==
In 1949 the publisher Mondadori commissioned writer Guido Martina and artist Raffaele Paparella the creation of a new realistic comic series, inspired by the legendary hero of the West, to alternate with the Disney stories in the series Albi D'Oro ("Golden Albums").

Despite the market of western comics was quite inflated (Tex, Piccolo sceriffo, Captain Miki, Kinowa) the Pecos Bill comics were quite successful. The comic version of Pecos Bill distinguished by the total rejection of the use of firearms (he was instead very skilled with the lasso) and by the characteristic of never killing his enemies. The series was published between 3 December 1949 and 31 March 1955. In addition to Paparella, the series also featured artwork by Antonio Canale, Pier Lorenzo De Vita, Roy D'Ami, Francesco Gamba, Gino D'Antonio, and Dino Battaglia.

After its conclusion, it was revived several times by different publishers and authors. In 1956, the Alpe publishing house launched Le nuove avventure di Pecos Bill, a reinterpretation of the character written by Cesare Solini and illustrated by Pietro Gamba. In 1960, Mondadori brought the character back by reprinting the stories from the Albi d’Oro series in Gli Albi di Pecos Bill, later selling the rights in 1962 to the Fasani publishing house, which continued the saga with over three hundred new stories until 1967. In 1978, publisher Bianconi introduced yet another version of the hero, this time created by Armando Bonato. Over the years, Pecos Bill stories have been reprinted many times by various Italian publishers.
