= Beveridge Island (Victoria) =

Island in Victoria, Australia

Beveridge Island Victoria
- Coordinates: 35°13′S 143°34′E
- LGA(s): Rural City of Swan Hill
Lands administrative divisions around Beveridge Island:
Speewa, New South Wales
Speewa, Victoria	Beveridge Island
	Tyntynder

Beveridge Island is an island in Victoria, Australia, within the locality of Tyntynder in the Rural City of Swan Hill.

It is enclosed by the Murray River, and an anabranch of the river in the south and has an area of approximately 1116 hectares.

There are no road crossings to the island.

== Boundary dispute ==
In 1873, the year after the Privy Council determined that Pental Island was part of Victoria, New South Wales and Victoria agreed that Beveridge Island was also Victorian territory. This agreement was based on the conclusion of the states' respective Surveyors General that the northern branch of the Murray River was the main channel. In 1982, William Hazlett, a farmer who had been charged in the Magistrates' Court of Victoria with illegally taking water from the southern stream of the Murray River to irrigate Beveridge Island, unsuccessfully challenged this agreement in the High Court, arguing that the southern branch was the main one and the island was therefore in New South Wales. The High Court dismissed his appeal, confirming that the island was part of Victoria.

== See also ==
- Pental Island
