= Steam Heritage Trail =

Rail trail on Isle of Man

Coordinates: 54°11′24″N 4°35′28″W

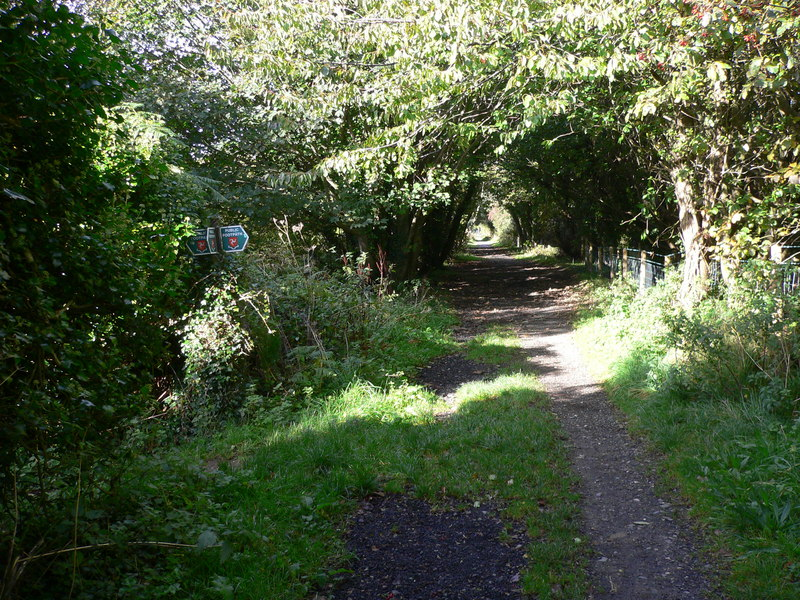
- The trail path consists of both clay and paved sections
- Length: 11 miles (18 km) (current)
- Location: Isle of Man, Irish Sea
- Trailheads: Douglas; Peel
- Use: Hiking, cycling

The Steam Heritage Trail is a rail trail and heritage trail that links the east and west coasts of the Isle of Man. The trail links Douglas to Peel. Sections were relaid in 2019 and 2020.

In August 2020, the Isle of Man Government, published plans to add a spur from St John's on the heritage trail to Kirk Michael. By 2022, this project was in doubt due to budget overruns.

Repairs to the trail have been carried out in 2023.

The trail has been the basis of a racing series since 2024.

Other rail-trails on the island include a section in Ramsey.
