= Folklorism =

Concept of folklore transmission

Folklorism or folklorismus is a concept of folklore transmission developed by Hans Moser and, separately, Viktor Gusev. It can be defined neutrally, for example "The innovative and often commercial use of folk materials such as costumes, folk songs, folktales, proverbs, and so forth, outside their traditional contexts", or more pejoratively, for example as "spurious and misleading 'fake-lore' that exists in a 'second life' outside its 'source-community,' is materialistic and popular (e.g., 'commercialized folklore'), and is manifest in an 'objectified form'."

== Categories ==
Folklorism can be broadly categorized in three ways: the performance of folk culture away from its original context, the playful imitation of popular motifs by another social class, and the creation of folklore for different purposes outside of any known tradition.

The third form of folklorism, the creation of new forms of folklore outside of existing traditions, can be compared with the concept of fakelore.

The Serbian folklorist Nemanja Radulovic argued that the Slavic Native Faith could be understood as a form of folklorism.
