= Johnny Kaw =

Fictional character in Kansas folklore

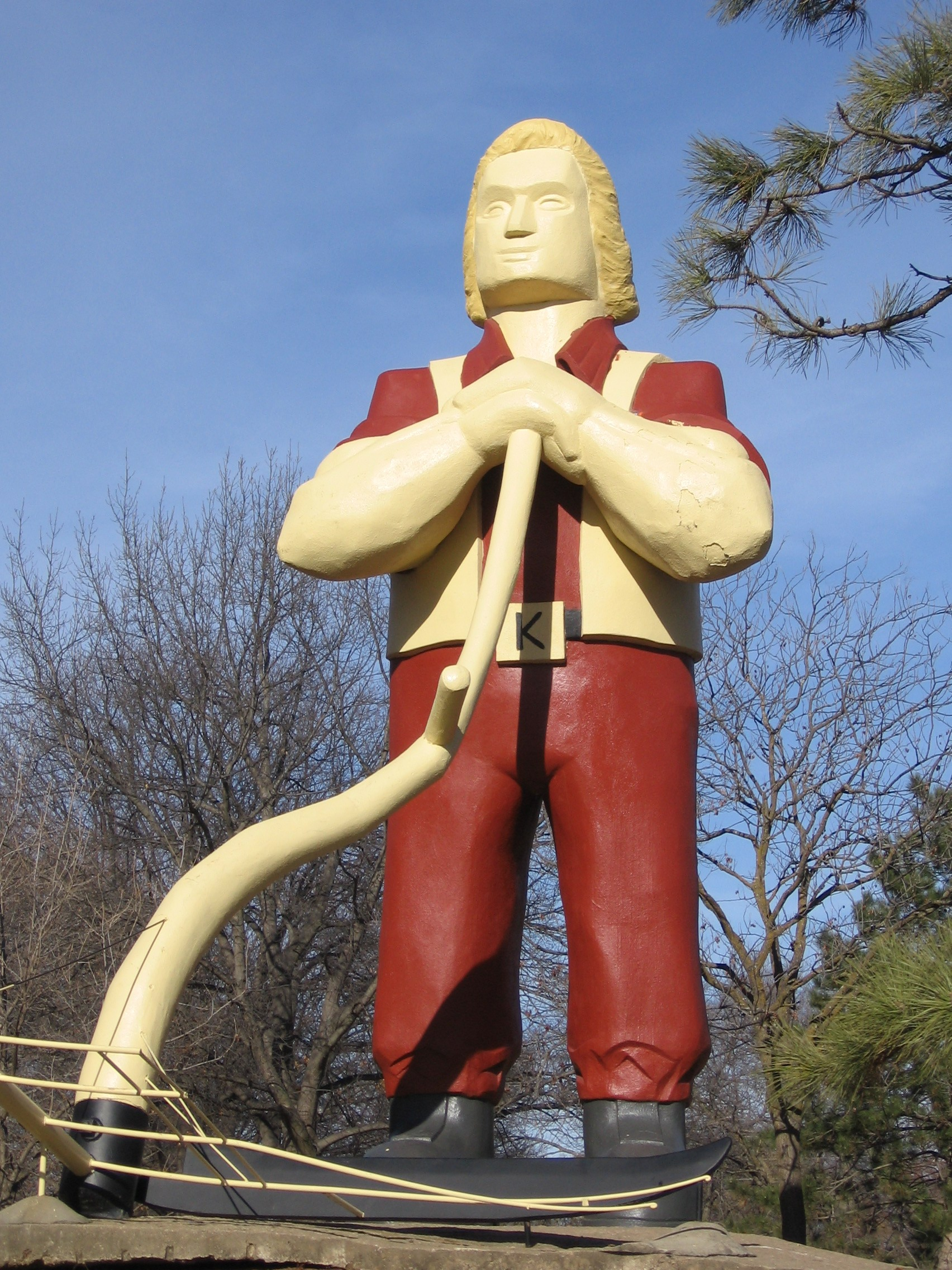
Statue of Johnny Kaw in Manhattan, Kansas

Johnny Kaw is a fictional Kansas settler and the subject of a number of Paul Bunyan-esque tall tales about the settling of the territory.

The legend of Johnny Kaw was created in 1955 by George Filinger, a professor of horticulture at Kansas State University, to celebrate the centennial of Manhattan, Kansas. The stories were initially printed in the city newspaper, The Manhattan Mercury, during the centennial and later collected into a self-published book by Filinger, who created Kaw to be Kansas' answer to other heroes like Bunyan and Pecos Bill. Elmer Tomasch of the Kansas State University Art Department provided ink drawings to illustrate the stories and the book.

Filinger's stories related how Johnny Kaw created the Kansas landscape, geography and pioneer trails. Kaw was said to have dug the Kansas River Valley, planted wheat, invented sunflowers, and grown giant potatoes. Kaw even controlled the weather, lopping the funnels off tornadoes and wringing out the clouds to end droughts. His pets were the mascots for the two state universities: a wildcat and a jayhawk, who enjoyed a good fight. The Dust Bowl was said to be a result of their fights.

Filinger's book was not republished after 1969, but Kansas author Jerri Garretson released a children's picture book about Johnny Kaw in 1997. Her book was illustrated by another KSU art instructor, Diane A. Dollar. A color edition of the book was published in September 2011 and the original version was included in the 2008 anthology Kansas Tall Tales.

== Statue ==
A 24-foot-tall (7.3 m) statue of Johnny Kaw holding a scythe stands in Manhattan City Park, Kansas (39.1802°N 96.5736°W). Three small statues were created before the large one was erected in City Park. Mrs. Walter O’Neill of Manhattan sculped the first one for the centennial. It was featured in City Park during the 1955 Centennial, but vandals beheaded it. It was then moved to a farm, where someone backed a wagon over it. The statue seen today was built in 1966, eleven years after the Manhattan Centennial celebration that inspired George Filinger to write the story of Johnny Kaw. George Filinger worked hard to promote the statue’s construction and donated a large share of the required money. The statue cost approximately $7,000, far exceeding the estimates of $3,000 to $3,500. Local citizens donated the money required, hoping that the statue would establish Johnny Kaw as a local legend and prove to be a roadside attraction. The statue is constructed of concrete over a steel beam framework. The design was intended to withstand wind and weather and be easy to maintain. Less than a month after its dedication on 15 May 1966, a tornado swept through Manhattan, yet the statue emerged unscathed proof, locals say, that it really was “built to last.”

The statue was featured in a Zippy the Pinhead comic strip on September 17, 2005.

== See also ==
- Fakelore
- Novelty architecture
