= Pier Lorenzo De Vita =

Italian comics artist (1909–1990)

Pier Lorenzo De Vita (21 November 1909 – 7 April 1990) was an Italian comic book artist.

== Life and career ==
Born in Castiglione Olona, De Vita made his professional debut in 1934 in the magazine Jumbo. In 1936 he started collaborating with Scena illustrata and Corriere dei Piccoli, for which he created the long-running series La Primula Rossa del Risorgimento.

In 1938 De Vita debuted on Topolino with a comic adaptation of Albert Robida's novel The Adventures of Saturnin Farandoul. After illustrating Tuffolino, a Mickey Mouse imitation for the magazine Paperino, as well as some adventure comic series such as Pecos Bill and Oklahoma, in 1955 he started a long collaboration with Guido Martina with a Donald Duck story, Paperino Don Chisciotte. He continued to illustrate Disney stories often written by Martina until his retirement in 1981.

De Vita died in Domaso.
