= Black Heritage Trail =

Black Heritage Trail or African American Heritage Trail may refer to one of the following, all in the United States:

- African American Heritage Trail of St. Petersburg, Florida
- African American Heritage Trail of Westchester County, New York
- Black Heritage Trail (Boston), Massachusetts
- Black Heritage Trail (Columbus, Georgia)
- Black Heritage Trail of New Hampshire
- Florida Black Heritage Trail
- Louisiana African American Heritage Trail

== See also ==
- Heritage Trail (disambiguation)
