= Raffaele Paparella =

Italian comic artist and illustrator

- Born: 26 December 1915; Carmagnola, Italy
- Died: 11 November 2001 (aged 85); Rome, Italy
- Occupation: Comic artist

Raffaele Paparella (26 December 1915 – 11 November 2001) was an Italian comic artist and illustrator.

== Life and career ==
Born in Carmagnola, after getting a teaching diploma Paparella worked two years as a school teacher. In 1937 he began collaborating with the magazine Il Vittorioso and with several Mondadori publications as an illustrator.

Paparella debuted as a comic artist in 1940, drawing Gian Luigi Bonelli's stories "Il terrore del colorado" and "I tre gigli", both published in Il Vittorioso. In 1948 he collaborated with Federico Pedrocchi for the Topolino's story La compagnia dei sette, and illustrated the comic adaptations of several Emilio Salgari's novels which were published in the magazine Salgari. In 1949 he created with Guido Martina his major success, the popular western series Pecos Bill, and in 1952 the adventure series Oklahoma.

Following the end of the Pecos Bill series, Paparella collaborated with the publisher Edizioni Araldo, and from the second half of the 1960s, with the French publishing house Lug. Starting from the late 1970s, he abandoned comics, focusing on satirical cartoons and illustrations.
