= Tall tale =

Unbelievable story

A tall tale is a story with unbelievable elements, told as if it were true and factual. Some tall tales are exaggerations of actual events, for example fish stories ("the fish that got away") such as, "That fish was so big it nearly sank the boat when I pulled it in!" Other tall tales are completely fictional tales set in a familiar setting, such as the European countryside, the American frontier, the Canadian Northwest, the Australian outback, or the beginning of the Industrial Revolution.

Events are often told in a way that makes the narrator seem to have been a part of the story; the tone is generally good-natured. Legends are differentiated from tall tales primarily by age; many legends exaggerate the exploits of their heroes, but in tall tales the exaggeration looms large, to the extent of dominating the story.

== United States ==
The tall tale has become a fundamental element of American folk literature. The tall tale's origins are seen in the bragging contests that often occurred when the rough men of the American frontier gathered. The tales of legendary figures of the Old West, some listed below, owe much to the style of tall tales.

In her book American Tall Tales, author Mary Pope Osborne states:

Tall talk, or exaggerated storytelling, began in the 1800s as a way for Americans to come to terms with the vast and inhospitable lands they'd come to inhabit—thick, dark forests filled with bears and panthers; treeless, arid deserts and plains; towering mountains; and uncharted seacoasts. The heroes and heroines of the tales were like the land itself—gigantic, extravagant, restless, and flamboyant.

The semi-annual speech-contests held by Toastmasters International public-speaking clubs may include a tall-tales contest. Each and every participating speaker is given three to five minutes to give a short speech of a tall-tale nature, and is then judged according to several factors. The winner proceeds to the next level of competition. The contest does not proceed beyond any participating district in the organization to the international level.

The comic strip Non Sequitur (1992–present) sometimes features tall tales told by the character Captain Eddie; it is left up to the reader to decide if he is telling the truth, exaggerating a real event, or fabricating a story entirely.

=== About real people ===
Some stories are told about exaggerated versions of real people:

- Johnny Appleseed – a friendly folk-hero who traveled the West planting apple trees because he felt his guardian angel told him to
- Blackbeard spawned various tall tales surrounding his involvement with piracy from 1717 to 1718
- Johnny Blood – an American football player whose reputation for wild behavior was as well known as his on-field play
- Jim Bowie – A Kentuckian frontiersman, Texas Ranger, and land speculator who fought for the Texan cause in the Battle of the Alamo. He is known for the Bowie knife which he used to disembowel opponents.
- Daniel Boone – blazed a trail across Cumberland Gap to found the first English-speaking colonies west of the Appalachian Mountains
- Davy Crockett – a pioneer and U.S. Congressman from Tennessee who later died at the Battle of the Alamo
- Mike Fink – the toughest boatman on the Ohio and Mississippi rivers, and a rival of Davy Crockett. Also known as the King of the Mississippi River Keelboatmen.
- Peter Francisco – American Revolutionary War hero
- John Henry – a mighty steel-driving African American
- Calamity Jane – a tough Wild-West woman
- Jigger Johnson (1871–1935), a lumberjack and log driver from Maine who is known for his numerous off-the-job exploits, such as catching bobcats alive with his bare hands, and drunken brawls
- Casey Jones – a brave and gritty railroad engineer
- Nat Love, also known as "Deadwood Dick", was born a slave in Tennessee in 1854. Tales of his adventures after emancipation, as a cowboy and as a Pullman porter, gained such fantastical elements as to be considered tall tales
- Sam Patch – an early 19th-century daredevil who died during a jump on Friday the 13th
- Molly Pitcher – a heroine of the American Revolutionary War

=== About imaginary people ===
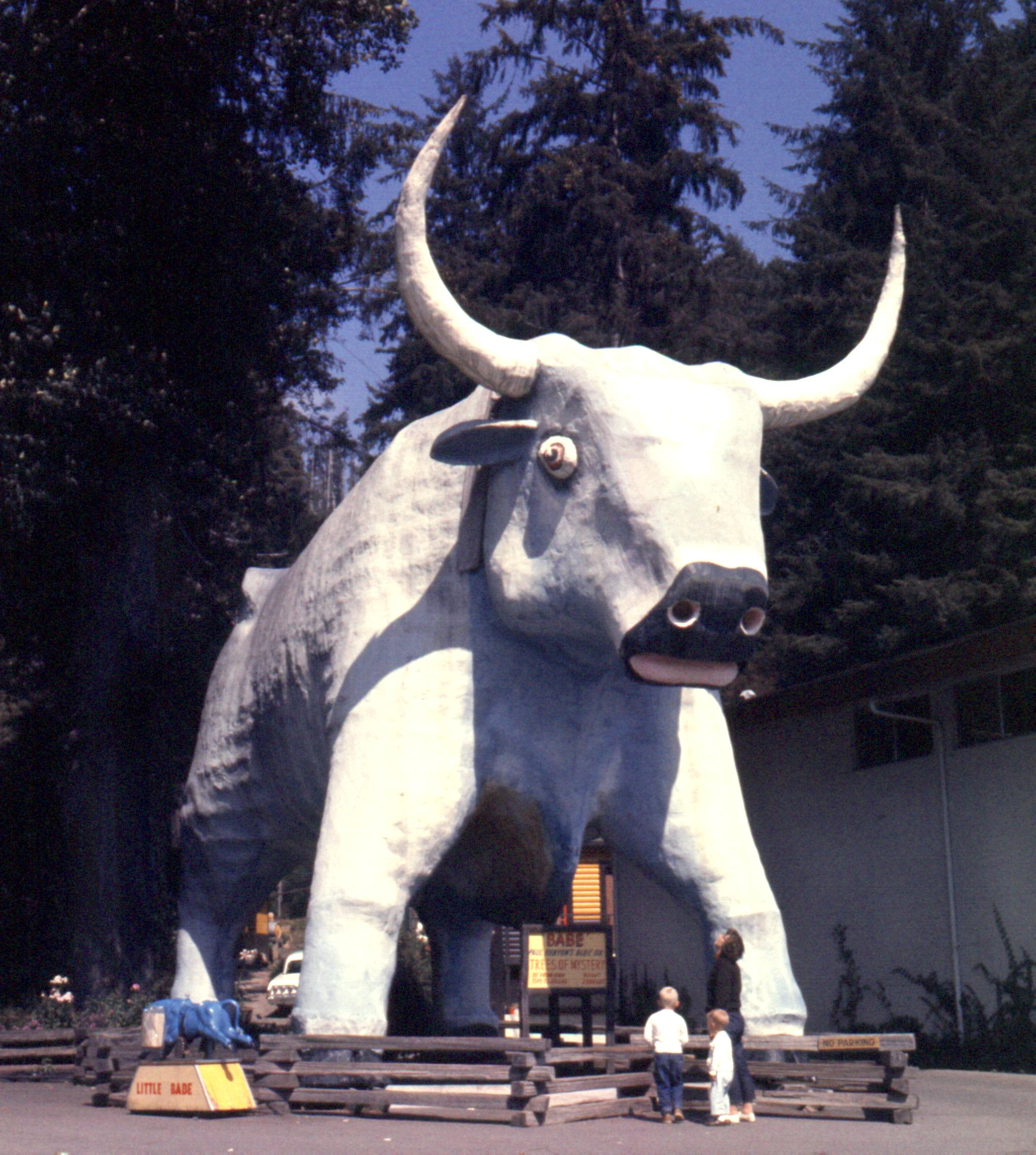
Paul Bunyan's sidekick, Babe the blue ox, sculpted as a ten-meter tall roadside tourist-attraction

Subjects of some American tall tales include legendary figures:

- Paul Bunyan – huge lumberjack who eats 50 pancakes in one minute, dug the Grand Canyon with his axe, made Minnesota's ten thousand lakes with his footprints, and also has a blue ox named Babe who made the Mississippi River
- Tony Beaver – a West Virginia lumberjack and cousin of Paul Bunyan
- Pecos Bill – legendary cowboy who "tamed the wild west"
- Cordwood Pete – younger brother to lumberjack Paul Bunyan
- Febold Feboldson – a Nebraska farmer who could fight a drought
- Mose Humphrey; a brave NYC firefighter
- Johnny Kaw, a fictional Kansan whose mythological status itself was in one sense a figment, in that it was created recently, in 1955. Adherents of this assessment deem such stories fakelore.
- Joe Magarac – a Pittsburgh steelworker made of steel
- Alfred Bulltop Stormalong – an immense sailor whose ship was so big that it scraped the Moon

== Australia ==
The Australian frontier (known as the bush or the outback) similarly inspired the types of tall tales that are found in American folklore. The Australian versions typically concern a mythical station called The Speewah. The heroes of the Speewah include:

- Rodney Ansell
- Big Bill – The dumbest man on the Speewah who made his living cutting up mining shafts and selling them for post holes
- Crooked Mick – A champion shearer who had colossal strength and quick wit.

Another folk hero is Charlie McKeahnie, the hero of Banjo Paterson's poem "The Man from Snowy River", whose bravery, adaptability, and risk-taking could epitomise the new Australian spirit.

== Canada ==
The Canadian frontier has also inspired the types of tall tales that are found in American folklore, such as:

- French Canadian tales of Big Joe Mufferaw, a giant of a lumberjack and woodsman from the Ottawa Valley, loosely based on real-life lumberjack Joseph Montferrand
- Johnny Chinook, a Métis cowboy and rancher in Alberta.
- Sam McGee, the hero of Robert Service's poem, "The Cremation of Sam McGee" (1907)

== Europe ==
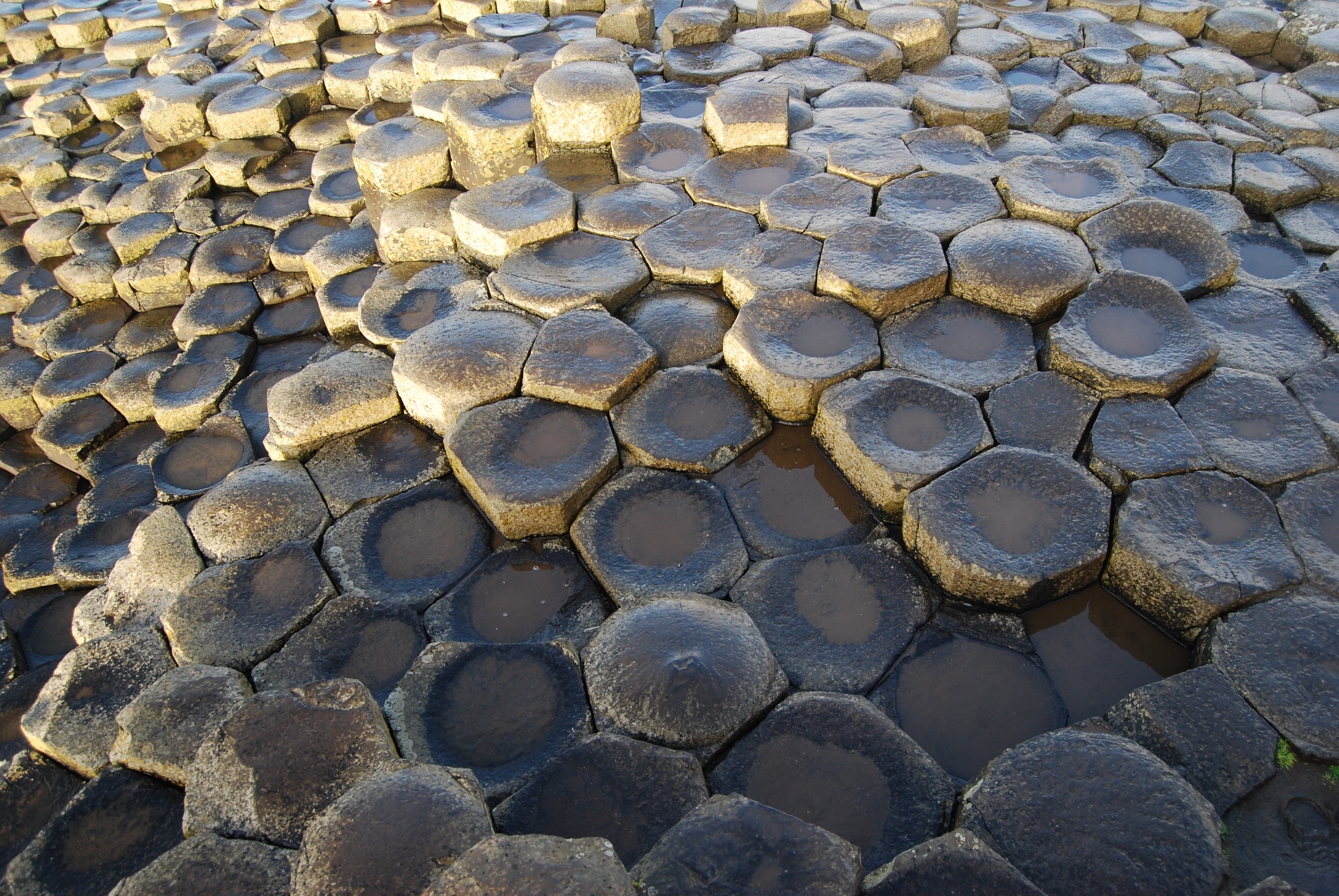
The Columnar basalt that makes up the Giant's Causeway; in legend, a fine set of hexagonal stepping stones to Scotland, made by Fionn mac Cumhaill

Some European tall tales include:

- Toell the Great was one of the great tall tales of Estonia.
- The Babin Republic, in Renaissance Poland (1568), was a satirical society dedicated entirely to mocking people and telling tall tales.
- Juho Nätti (1890–1964), known as Nätti-Jussi, was a Finnish lumberjack known for telling tall tales; his stories have also circulated as folk tales and been collected in books.
- The Life of Gargantua and of Pantagruel (16th century) by the French writer François Rabelais told the tale of two giants; father and son.
- The many farfetched adventures of the fictional German nobleman Baron Munchausen, most prominently in the novel Baron Munchausen's Narrative of his Marvellous Travels and Campaigns in Russia (1785) by Rudolf Erich Raspe and the following German supplemented adaptation by Gottfried August Bürger, are loosely based on Hieronymus Karl Friedrich, Freiherr von Münchhausen (1720−1797).
- Legends of the Irish mythological hunter-warrior Fionn mac Cumhaill, also known as Finn MacCool, have it that he built the Giant's Causeway as stepping-stones to Scotland, so as not to get his feet wet, and that he also once scooped up part of Ireland to fling it at a rival, but it missed and landed in the Irish Sea; the clump became the Isle of Man, the pebble became Rockall, and the void became Lough Neagh.
- Laughter and Grief by the White Sea, a Soviet film, depicts tall tales of the Pomors. A Pomor elder describes several stories, including a brown bear coating himself in baking soda to be acceptable to humans as a polar bear.
- The Cumbrian Liars, a United Kingdom association who follow in the seven-league footsteps of Will Ritson.
- "The Irish Rover" is a well-known Irish folk song about an implausibly large sailing ship with a fanciful cargo.
- Oskar, later known as "Unsinkable Sam," was a ship's cat that was supposed to have survived the sinking of three ships during WWII: the German Bismarck on 27 May 1941, HMS Cossack on 27 October 1941, and finally HMS Ark Royal on 14 November 1941. While photographs exist of a ship's cat purported to be Oskar on HMS Ark Royal, the historicity of this legend is debated.

== In visual media ==
Early 20th-century postcards became a vehicle for tall tale telling in the US. Creators of these cards, such as the prolific Alfred Stanley Johnson Jr. and William H. "Dad" Martin, usually employed trick photography, including forced perspective, while others painted their unlikely tableaus, or used a combination of painting and photography in early examples of photo retouching. The common theme was gigantism: fishing for leviathans, hunting for or riding oversized animals, and bringing in the impossibly huge sheaves. An homage to the genre can be found on the cover of the Eat a Peach (1972) album by The Allman Brothers Band.

== See also ==
- Big Fish – Tim Burton movie relating the story of a dying man exaggerating the details of his life to his son
- Bill Brasky
- Campfire story
- Chuck Norris facts
- Fairy tale
- Folklore
- Found manuscript
- Mythomania
- Snipe hunt
- The Most Interesting Man in the World
- Unreliable narrator
- Urban legend
