= Tex O'Reilly =

American mercenary and writer (1880–1946)

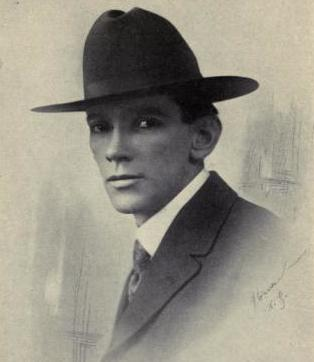
- O'Reilly from Roving and Fighting: Adventures Under Four Flags, published in 1918
- Born: Edward Sinnott O'Reilly; 15 August 1880; Denton, Texas
- Died: 8 December 1946 (aged 66); Tupper Lake, New York
- Military career
- Allegiance: United States; Korean Empire; Qing Empire; Maderistas; Constitutionalists; Spain
- Branch: United States Army; Shanghai Municipal Police; Texas National Guard
- Unit: 4th Infantry Regiment
- Conflicts: Spanish American War; Philippine–American War; The Boxer Rebellion; Mexican Revolution; World War I Rif War

Edward Sinnott "Tex" O'Reilly (15 August 1880 – 8 December 1946) was an American soldier of fortune, writer, journalist, and film actor. He is said to have fought in ten wars under many flags. Initially serving in the U.S. Army in the Spanish–American War, the Philippine–American War, and the Boxer Rebellion, he would claim to fight in several conflicts in Central America and to have fought with Pancho Villa in Mexico and claimed to have fought in the Rif War with the Spanish Foreign Legion in North Africa. He worked as a reporter for the Associated Press. He wrote an autobiography, Roving and Fighting, and Lowell Thomas wrote Born to Raise Hell about him. The latter book has been reprinted and is distributed by The Long Riders' Guild Press. He was the author of Pecos Bill.

== Early life ==
Edward O'Reilly was born in Denton, Texas in 1880. His father worked as a construction worker and the family would frequently move around looking for work. When there was no work, they would settle down in a ranch they lived on near San Saba. Growing up in the 'Wild West' had a profound effect on him, and he grew up learning how to ride, shoot, and survive in the wilderness. He was once sent into town by his mother when he witnessed a shootout in which seven people were shot. His family eventually decided to move to Chicago due to the violence.

While living Chicago, O'Reilly heard news about the USS Maine sinking in the port of Havana in February 1898. This event motivated him to join the Army, having to lie about his age to join without his parents' permission since he was only 17 at the time. He was enrolled in Company B of the 4th Infantry Regiment and sent to Tampa, Florida after training before being deployed to Cuba.

== Spanish-American War ==
After arriving in Cuba, the extreme heat and constant mosquitos were a major problem. O'Reilly also claimed the extremely poor quality rations were "a slimy, ill-smelling mess, disgusting in appearance and fatal in effect." He first witnessed action in The Battle of El Caney. The battle was a failure for the American side and O'Reilly described the chaos the battle degenerated into. Shelling from Spanish artillery's had disoriented him, and how the heat and lack of water lead to some of his comrades fighting each other over canteens in the middle of the battle. He jumped into a trench where a Spanish soldier raised his gun on him, only to be saved at the last second when a Black American soldier killed him at the last second.

After this, O'Reilly claimed to have never seen a Spanish soldier again, but that he and his fellow soldiers were under constant fire from combatants in the surrounding jungle. After the Battle of San Juan Hill and the decisive American victory at the Battle of Santiago de Cuba, the Spanish surrendered. O'Reilly's company was stationed in Cuba for another month after the Spanish surrender where he noted that lack of supplies led to soldiers fighting over the few food rations left.

== Soldier of Fortune ==
After the Spanish-American War, O'Reilly served as a bodyguard for the Emperor of Korea, taught English in Japan, joined the international police force in Shanghai, became a rent collector for a landlord in China, a nightclub bouncer, and then began training the Chinese military before fighting in the Boxer Rebellion. He then went on to take part in military campaigns in Honduras, Nicaragua, and Mexico, followed by a stint in the Spanish Foreign Legion that saw him fight in Northern Africa. He wrote in his book Roving and Fighting that when he joined the army at 17 years old, he only had 15 cents in his pocket. When he returned home from all his foreign exploits, he'd increased his wealth to 25 cents.

== Film career ==
Tex O'Reilly wrote and acted in western silent films. He wrote I Am the Woman (1921), and wrote and acted in Honeymoon Ranch (1920), West of the Rio Grande (1921), and On the High Card (1921).

== Pecos Bill ==
Tex O’Reilly created the fictional cowboy hero Pecos Bill. The first known story featuring the character, titled The Saga of Pecos Bill, was published in The Century Magazine in October 1923. O’Reilly claimed that the tales originated from an oral storytelling tradition among cowboys during the westward expansion in Texas, New Mexico, and Arizona. However, folklorists J. Frank Dobie and Richard M. Dorson later determined that the stories were O’Reilly's own inventions, although subsequent writers borrowed from his work or added new fabricated adventures.

O'Reilly had previously used the name Pecos Bill for bandit characters in short films on which he worked as both screenwriter and actor: West of the Rio Grande (1921), in which he portrayed Pecos Bill, and On the High Card (1921).

Between January and February 1935, O'Reilly published Pecos Bill stories in Adventure Magazine.

O’Reilly also co-authored a comic strip adaptation of Pecos Bill with cartoonist Jack A. Warren (Alonzo Vincent Warren), distributed by the George Matthew Adams Service between 1936 and 1937.

== Bibliography ==
- O'Reilly, Edward S.; Roving and Fighting: Adventures Under Four Flags; The Century Co., New York (1918), republished Kessinger Publishing (2012)
- O'Reilly, Edward S.; The Saga of Pecos BIll; The Century Magazine, The Century Co., New York (1923)
- O'Reilly, Edward S. and Thomas, Lowell; Born to Raise Hell; The Unbelievable but True Life Story of an Infamous Soldier of Fortune; The Long Riders' Guild Press (2001)
- Edward Sinnott O'Reilly, Pecos Bill, Adventure Magazine (New York: Ridgway, 1935).
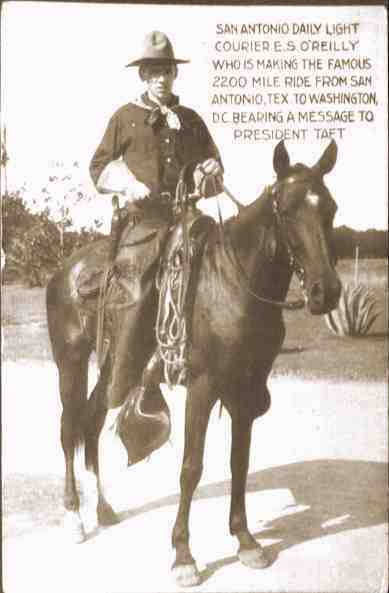
  O'Reilly Who Is Making The Famous 2,200 Mile Ride From San Antonio, Tex. To Washington, D.C. Bearing A Message To President Taft.
