= Tony Beaver =

Character from American folklore

Tony Beaver is a character in several tall tales, often in tandem with stories of Paul Bunyan. Beaver was a West Virginian woodsman located up Eel River, often described as a cousin of Paul Bunyan, and champion griddle skater of the Southern United States. The stories appeared in print in the early 20th century and were later compiled by Mary E. Cober.

"Tony Beaver" is also the title of a folk operetta created by Josef Marais in 1952 with Max Berton writing the libretto and was published by G. Schirmer Inc. This 60 minute, one act folk opera has a West Virginia hillbilly theme created by Marais to have a country music sound. "Tony Beaver" was first performed at the Idyllwild School of Music and the Arts, Idyllwild, CA, in 1955.
