= Speewa, New South Wales =

Speewa New South Wales
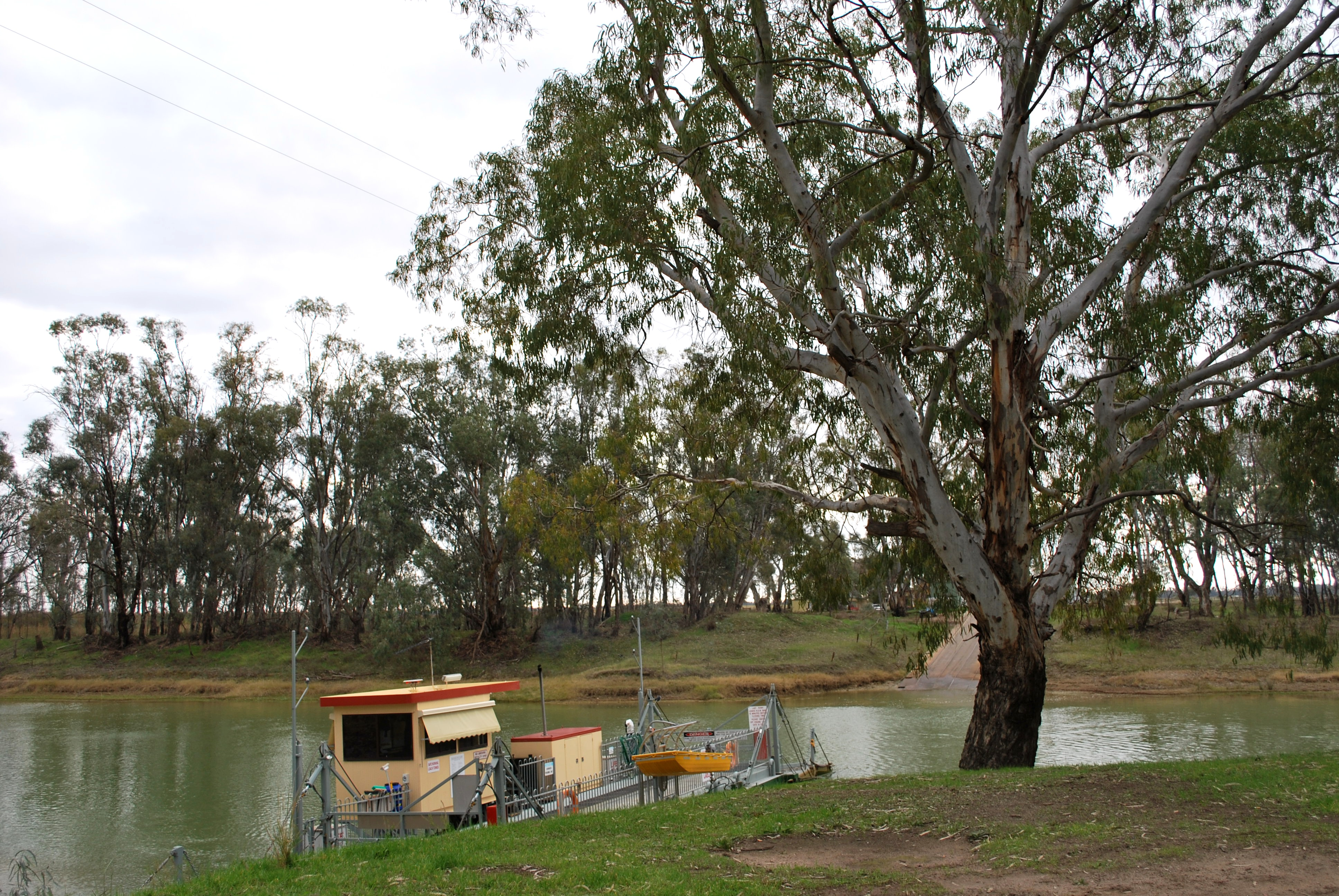
- The Speewa Ferry

- Coordinates: 35°12′S 143°34′E
- Population: 115 (SAL 2021)
- Postcode(s): 2735
- LGA(s): Murray River Council
- County: Wakool
- State electorate(s): Murray
- Federal division(s): Farrer

Speewa is a rural locality in the Riverina District of New South Wales, Australia near the Murray River in Murray River Council local government area.

It is connected to the locality of Speewa, Victoria by the Speewa Ferry across the Murray. It is unusual in that it shares its name with a contiguous locality in Victoria; the post office having been based in Victoria from 1924 until 1964, before moving to New South Wales until it closed in 1973.

== Speewa Island ==
Speewa Creek is an anabranch of the Murray River and at times of greater flow encloses most of the area of Speewa as Speewa Island. The upstream section of Speewa Creek is now usually dry with the island existing in name only. Speewa Island is adjacent to, and downstream from, Beveridge Island in Victoria.

== See also ==
- Speewa, Victoria
