= Speewa Ferry =

Cable ferry in Australia

Coordinates: 35.213377°S 143.508568°E

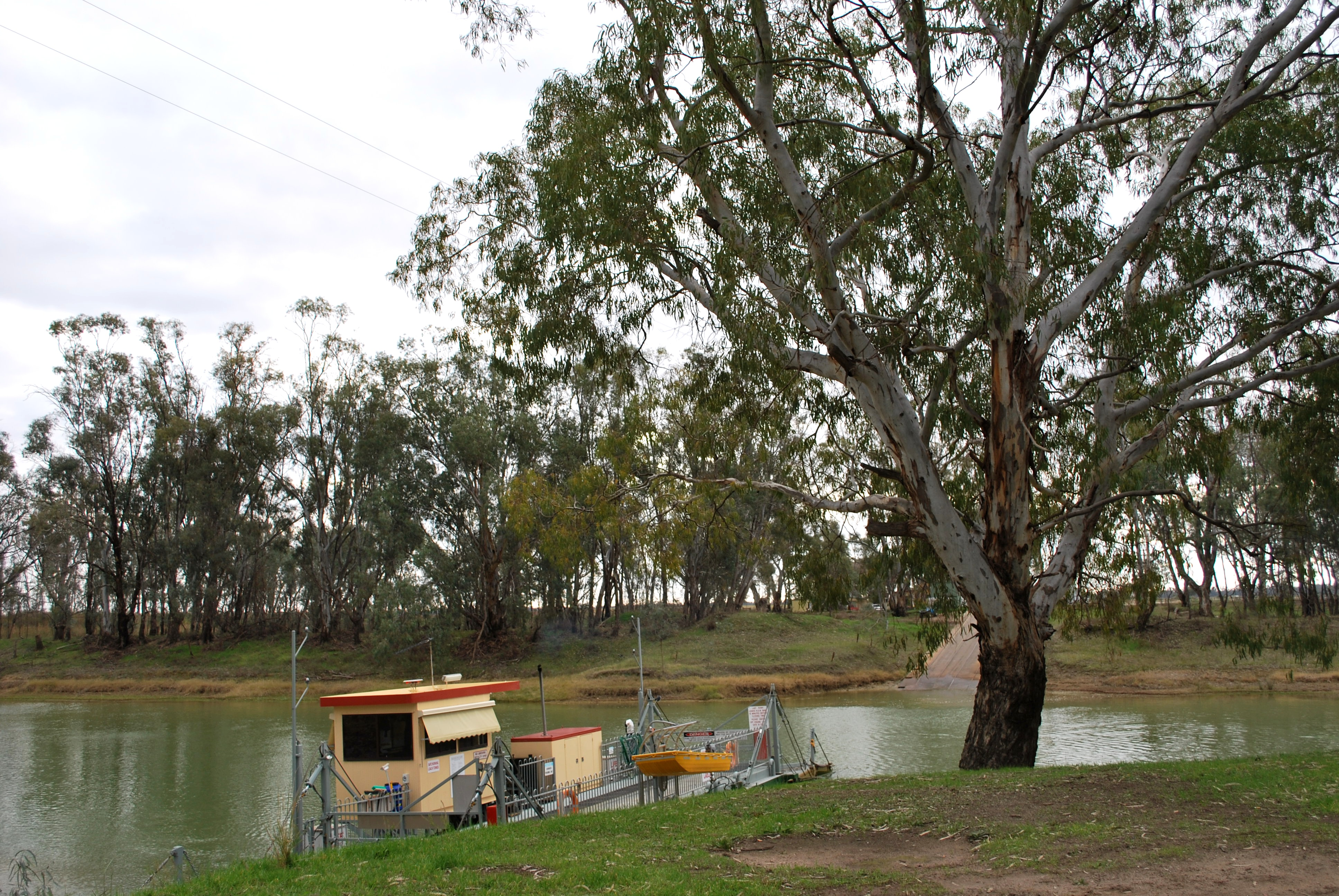
The Speewa Ferry, seen from the Victorian bank

The Speewa Ferry is a cable ferry across the Murray River on the border between the Australian states of New South Wales and Victoria. The ferry is located in the community of Speewa, Victoria, approximately 20 kilometres (12 mi) north of Swan Hill, off the road between Swan Hill and Nyah.

The ferry is controlled by Transport for NSW, but is jointly funded by both states. It operates seven days a week, carries a maximum of three cars at a time, and is free of tolls. The times of operation vary on different days of the week, but the ferry operates from 0800 to 2100 on all days, and longer on some. On each day there are two one-hour breaks in service.

The Speewa Ferry is one of only two cable ferries to cross the section of the Murray River between New South Wales and Victoria, the other being the Wymah Ferry nearly 500 kilometres (310 mi) upstream. However, there are another 11 such ferries further downstream, on the South Australia section of the river.

== See also ==
- Murray River crossings

Next crossing upstream	Murray River	Next crossing downstream
Murray River road bridge, Swan Hill	Speewa Ferry	Nyah Bridge
