= Guido Martina =

Italian comic book writer

- Born: Guido Martina; 9 February 1906 Carmagnola, Italy
- Died: 6 May 1991 (aged 85) Rome, Italy
- Area: Writer
- Notable works: Paperinik, Paperinika

Guido Martina (9 February 1906 – 6 May 1991) was an Italian comic writer, documentarist and author. Martina is well known for his Disney comics stories, including the first of the "Disney Parodies" story "L'inferno di Topolino", and the creation of Paperinik, Donald Duck's superhero alter ego.

== Life and career ==
Born in Carmagnola, at 16 years old Martina moved with his family to Turin, where he graduated in literature and philosophy because of the insistence of his father, while he would have preferred to study engineering. After brief experiences as teacher and journalist for Il Popolo d'Italia, he realized several documentaries as director and screenwriter, moving to live and work in Paris for five years.

Returned to Italy in 1938, Martina started collaborating with Topolino as translator of American stories. During this time he also wrote a radio variety show and directed a short-lived satirical magazine, Fra' Diavolo. During World War II he served as cavalry officer in Libya, where he was taken prisoner by the British army. Following the Armistice of Cassibile he was moved in Poland, from where he was deported to a Nazi concentration camp in Austria.

In 1945, Martina reprised his collaboration with Topolino, also creating his first original Disney comics stories. In 1949 he started the "Disney Parodies" (i.e. "Disney Parodies") saga with the celebrated story "L'inferno di Topolino", a parody of Dante Alighieri's Inferno. During his career he wrote hundreds of stories, creating dozens of characters, including Paperinik.

In 1949, he created with Raffaele Paparella the popular western series Pecos Bill, and in 1952 the adventure series Oklahoma. He also collaborated with the comic magazines Cucciolo and Tiramolla, and wrote several photonovels for Il Vittorioso.

Outside comics, Martina also collaborated with Disney as author of 11 volumes of the 24 volumes-long Enciclopedia Disney, and as author of the book series in 21 volumes In giro per il mondo con Disney.
