= Alfred Bulltop Stormalong =

American folk hero

Captain Alfred Bulltop Stormalong was an American folk hero and the subject of numerous nautical-themed tall tales originating in Massachusetts. Stormalong was said to be a sailor and a giant, some 30 feet (9.1 m) tall; he was the master of a huge clipper ship known in various sources as either the Courser or the Tuscarora, a ship purportedly so tall that it had hinged masts to avoid catching on the Moon.

== Origin ==
The name of Stormalong first appeared in a cycle of sea shanties that Stan Hugill, in his Sea Shanties of the Seven Seas, traces back to African-American folk songs of the 1830s and '40s. Bearing names like "Mister Stormalong", "Way Stormalong John", and "Yankee John, Stormalong", these sailors' work songs generally featured praise for a deceased seaman and for his benevolent son. A typical lyric went:

Ol' Stormy he is dead and gone,
To me way you Storm-a-long!
Ol' Stormy he is dead and gone,
Aye! Aye! Aye! Mister Storm-a-long!

The tall tales about Stormalong first appeared in the 1911 book Here's Audacity! by Frank Shay. More tales appeared in the 1933 pamphlet Old Stormalong Yarns by C.E. Brown.

In one shanty, Stormalong is conflated with the historical figure Zachary Taylor:

General Taylor gained the day
Walk him along, John, carry him along
Oh, General Taylor gained the day
Carry him to his burying ground

To me way hey, you Stormy
Walk him along, John, carry him along
To me way hey, you Stormy
Carry him to his burying ground

== The Legend ==
New England was where he was beached as a baby, already three fathoms (18 ft) tall. According to one telling, he outgrew Cape Cod and moved to Boston, where he signed aboard the first ship that would take him at the age of twelve. It was said that he was responsible for the tradition of referring to seamen as "able-bodied" by signing his name on his first shipboard employment contract as "Stormalong, A.B."

He had a lifelong rivalry with a Kraken, a huge sea monster from Norse myth; in fact, the Kraken escaped from him in their first encounter, causing a dejected Stormalong to abandon the sea life for life as a farmer somewhere in the Midwest. Some sources say he had a ship so large that a stable of Arabian horses were aboard for his crew to get from one end of the ship to the other. Among other things, the ship Alfred was best said to have drilled the course of the Panama Canal by slamming into the Panamanian coast, and to have gotten stuck in the English Channel, which required the crew to grease the ship's hull with soap. The soap combined with the scraping of the hull against the Gray Cliffs of Dover turned them bright white. As Stormalong grew older, he eventually encountered the Kraken again, this time successfully drawing the beast into a whirlpool from which it never escaped.

Stormalong's death is not universally attested by all sources, but one ending to his life is as follows: After Stormalong angered a steamship captain by dumping water down the ship's funnel in an attempt to put out what he thought was a dangerous fire on the ship, the steamship Captain challenged Stormalong to a transatlantic race. The aged Stormalong won the race by several miles, but the stress of handling the wheel through the difficult Atlantic crossing killed him. Stormalong was buried at sea, and Davy Jones himself opened his famous locker to accept Stormalong's body.

Another ending to his life is as follows: While Stormalong was on his Caribbean adventures, he passed by Florida, seeing that there was a tremendous hurricane that tore through his ship. Ships sailing nearby were being tossed around by the heavy waves. Stormalong went overboard and piled as many boats as he could onto his ship. The storm was still running.

When the storm finally wound down, the sailors were dropped back off at Florida. After that, he went back on board, unfurling the sails of his ship, seeing if they could be repaired. A great wind, the last blow of the hurricane, hit the sails, lifting Stormalong and his ship into the sky.

A third ending to his life takes advantage of the inference that, being a giant, Alfred Bulltop Stormalong was an enormous eater. It describes a time when his hunger was greater than usual and led him to eat so much food (one variant cites a breakfast of six sharks; it is not definitely known what other variants exist) that he suffered terminal indigestion, causing his magnificent appetite to finish him.

== See also ==
- Bowleg Bill
