= Heritage trail =

Cultural heritage exploration trails

Heritage trails are walking trails and driving routes in urban and rural settings that are identified by signage and guidebooks as relating to cultural heritage. The heritage might be architectural, or it can be associated with a person or historical or cultural event. In most cases it is in public space.

The nature of the trail can be seen to be beneficial for community development, community participation, for discovering community heritage, and for involvement by community in developing the trails.

Heritage Walks are a means of publicizing the history of a country and contributing to the preservation of the city's history and character through conservation. The creation of an heritage walk can encourage people to support conservation and the protection of historical monuments and to collect and publish information about them. The residences of prominent citizens are also part of the heritage. Socially, heritage has the potential to contribute to the life and identity of an area. In many cases, they are focal points for community activities: public halls, schools, mechanics' institutes, places of religious worship, and parks.

== See also ==
- Historic roads and trails
- Pilgrimage
