= Speewa, Victoria =

Speewa Victoria
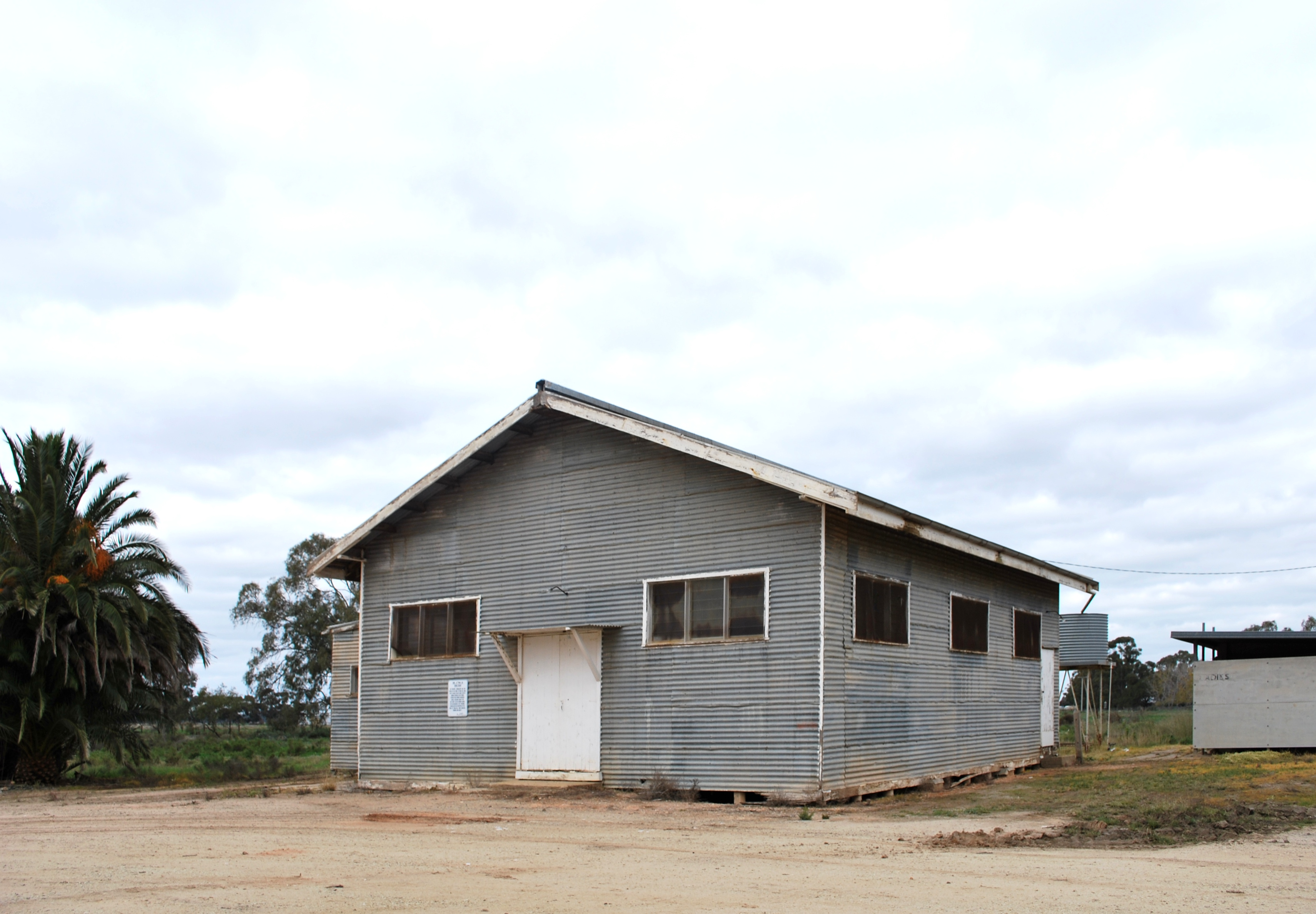
- Public hall

- Coordinates: 35°14′S 143°31′E
- Population: 98 (2016 census)
- Postcode(s): 3585
- Location: 357 km (222 mi) from Melbourne; 19 km (12 mi) from Swan Hill; 128 km (80 mi) from Robinvale; 212 km (132 mi) from Mildura
- LGA(s): Rural City of Swan Hill
- Federal division(s): Mallee
Localities around Speewa:
New South Wales	New South Wales	New South Wales
Beverford	Speewa	Tyntynder
Beverford	Tyntynder	Tyntynder

Speewa is a locality in Victoria, Australia, located approximately 19 km from Swan Hill, Victoria on the Murray River. It is unusual in that it shares its name with a contiguous locality in New South Wales.

The Speewa Ferry connecting it is the only crossing of the Murray River between Swan Hill and Nyah.

Speewa Post Office opened on 2 August 1924. In 1964 it was renamed as a New South Wales office.

== See also ==
- Murray River crossings
- Speewa, New South Wales
