= List of crossings of the Murray River =

The Murray River in south-eastern Australia has been a significant barrier to land-based travel and trade. This article lists and briefly describes all of the recognised crossing points. Many of these had also developed as river ports for transport of goods along the Murray. Now almost every significant town along the river has a bridge or vehicle-carrying cable ferry nearby.

The crossings are listed in order starting from the Murray Mouth and proceeding upstream.

== South Australia ==
Image	Crossing	Coordinates	Location	Built	Description	Notes
	Hindmarsh Island Bridge	35°30′17″S 138°47′21″E	Hindmarsh Island-Goolwa	2001	The controversial bridge replaced a ferry in March 2001	
	Narrung Ferry	35°30′46″S 139°11′17″E	Narrung		crosses The Narrows between Lake Alexandrina and Lake Albert	Named "Cockatoo"
	Wellington Ferry	35°19′51″S 139°23′8″E	Wellington			Named " Heron"
	Tailem Bend Ferry	35°15′26″S 139°27′8″E	Tailem Bend-Jervois			Named "Dotterel"
	Swanport Bridge	35°08′51″S 139°18′33″E	Murray Bridge	1979	At the end of the South Eastern Freeway	
	Murray Bridge	35°06′55″S 139°16′48″E	Murray Bridge	1927	Railway bridge	Adelaide-Wolseley railway line
	Murray River road bridge, Murray Bridge	35°06′55″S 139°16′48″E	Murray Bridge	1879	Shared road and rail bridge from 1886 until separate rail bridge built	
	Mannum Ferry	34°54′37″S 139°19′7″E	Mannum		Two parallel ferries	Upper Crossing Named "Pelican" and Lower Crossing Named "Water Hen"
	Purnong Ferry	34°51′17″S 139°37′0″E	Purnong		This is the narrowest crossing in South Australia	Named "Stilt II"
	Walker Flat Ferry	34°45′13″S 139°34′8″E	Walker Flat			Named "Rosella"
	Swan Reach Ferry	34°33′51″S 139°35′50″E	Swan Reach			Named "Swan"
	Old Blanchetown Bridge	34°20′43″S 139°37′2″E	Blanchetown	1963	The first major prestressed concrete highway bridge in South Australia.	Replaced a ferry crossing established in 1869. In the 1990s it was found to not be structurally sound enough to safely carry B-double trucks. Until a new bridge could be built, these were diverted from near Monash via Morgan on the Goyder and Thiele Highways to rejoin the Sturt Highway at Gawler, thus travelling further but avoiding the Kingston and Blanchetown bridges.
	Blanchetown Bridge	34°20′43″S 139°37′2″E	Blanchetown	1998	Incrementally launched post tensioned concrete box-girder bridge, built by York Civil.	Replacement bridge on the Sturt Highway immediately north of the 1963 bridge.
	Morgan Ferry	34°02′19″S 139°40′24″E	Morgan			Named "Coot"
	Cadell Ferry	34°01′32″S 139°45′45″E	Cadell			Named "Albatross II"
	Waikerie Ferry	34°10′30″S 139°59′13″E	Waikerie			Named " Quail"
	Kingston on Murray bridge	34°13′37″S 140°21′59″E	Kingston on Murray	1969	Sturt Highway A bridge replaced a ferry	
	Berri Bridge	34°17′22″S 140°35′59″E	Berri	1997	A bridge replaced two ferries	
	Lyrup Ferry	34°15′8″S 140°38′54″E	Lyrup			Named "Kingfisher"
	Paringa Bridge	34°10′51″S 140°46′33″E	Paringa-Renmark	1926	Sturt Highway, liftspan bridge - one lane of traffic each way with pedestrian/bike path in the middle on the former railway alignment.	

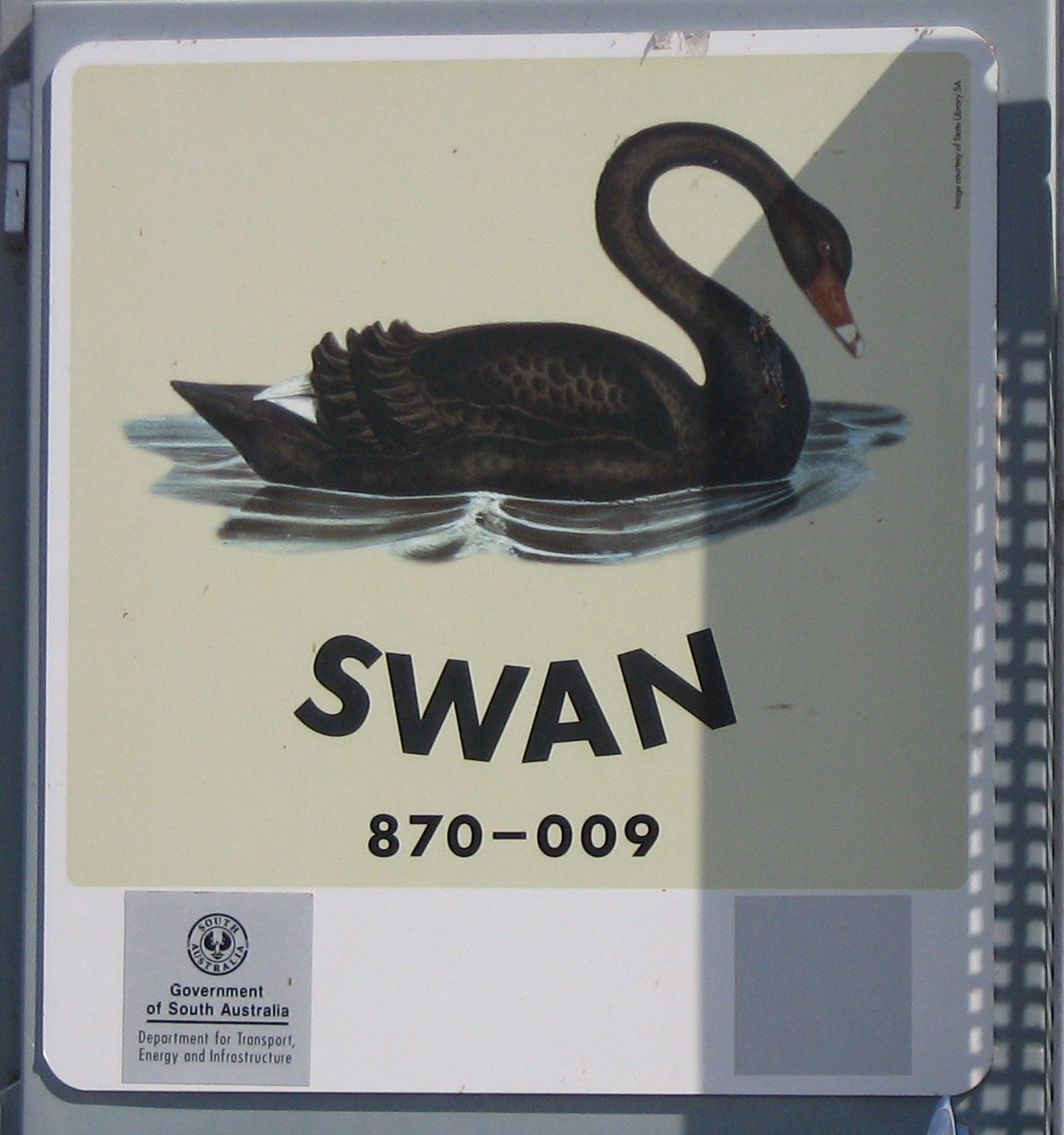
Ferry nameboard

As the ferries are registered as boats, each one has a name, usually named after a waterbird. As of July 2025, the ferry names are:

- Narrung: Cockatoo
- Wellington: Heron
- Tailem Bend: Dotterel
- Mannum large (downstream): Water Hen
- Mannum (small, upstream): Pelican
- Purnong: Stilt II
- Walker Flat: Rosella
- Swan Reach: Swan
- Morgan: Coot
- Cadell: Albatross II
- Waikerie: Quail
- Lyrup: Kingfisher

== In Victoria and New South Wales ==
The south bank of the river forms the border between these two states and former colonies, so in many cases there is a town on each side of the river. If two towns are named in this list, the Victorian one is first for clarity and consistency.

Most of the bridges downstream of Echuca are liftspan bridges to enable paddlesteamer traffic to pass underneath even in times of high water flow.

The Hume, Newell and Sturt Highway bridges are owned and managed by the Federal Government. The others are the responsibility of New South Wales and Victoria.

Image	Crossing	Coordinates	Location	Built	Description	Notes
	Abbotsford Bridge	34°06′50″S 141°59′17″E	Yelta to Curlwaa	1928	235 metres (771 ft) long, single lane lift bridge	
	George Chaffey Bridge	34°10′59″S 142°10′24″E	Mildura to Buronga	1985	331 metres (1,086 ft) long, 9.8 metres (32.2 ft) wide bridge carrying the Sturt Highway	
	Robinvale-Euston Bridge	34°34′40″S 142°46′3″E	Robinvale to Euston	2006	Replaced a single-lane lift-span road/rail bridge that was opened in 1927 as part of the abandoned Lette railway line..	
	Tooleybuc Bridge	35°01′49″S 143°20′7″E	Piangil to Tooleybuc	1925	timber and steel truss, single-lane restriction on lift span	
	Nyah Bridge	35°10′22″S 143°23′30″E	Nyah to Koraleigh	1941	104 metres (341.2 ft), central lift span	
	Speewa Ferry	35°12′49″S 143°30′31″E	Speewa		Two-car capacity, 8 tonne (8.8 t) load limit. Upstream is a private ferry to Beveridge Island (part of Victoria); it crosses a Little Murray anabranch, but that is now the main navigable channel.	
	Swan Hill Bridge	35°20′16″S 143°33′46″E	Swan Hill	1896	Two lanes except central lift span; 116 metres (380.6 ft)	
	Gonn Crossing Bridge	35°30′13″S 143°57′24″E	Murrabit to Ballbank	1926	103 metres (338 ft) Lift-span road/rail bridge, opened as part of the Stony Crossing railway line; road only since the railway closed in 1964.	
	Barham Bridge	35°37′50″S 144°07′29″E	Koondrook to Barham	1904	liftspan bridge, 99 metres (325 ft)	
	Dhungala Bridge	36°06′44″S 144°44′38″E	Echuca to Moama	2022	622 metres (2,041 ft) Cobb Highway crossing	
	Echuca-Moama Bridge (road)	36°07′19″S 144°45′13″E	Echuca to Moama	1879	built as joint road/rail bridge, bypassed in 2022, local traffic only	
	Echuca-Moama Bridge (rail)	36°07′19″S 144°45′13″E	Echuca to Moama	1989	rail	
	Barmah Bridge	36°01′8″S 144°57′19″E	Barmah	1966	168 metres (551.2 ft) replaced ferry	
	Tocumwal Bridge	35°48′50″S 145°33′24″E	Tocumwal	1895	originally a road/rail bridge	
	Edward Hillson Bridge	35°48′47″S 145°33′32″E	Tocumwal	1987	Newell Highway 212 metres (695.5 ft) long, 12 metres (39.4 ft) wide	
	Old Cobram-Barooga Bridge	35°54′57″S 145°40′9″E	Cobram to Barooga	1902	Old liftspan timber truss bridge (now pedestrian only)	
	Cobram-Barooga Bridge	35°54′58″S 145°40′9″E	Cobram to Barooga	2006	New concrete bridge built immediately upstream of the old bridge	
	Yarrawonga Weir	36°00′31″S 145°59′57″E	Yarrawonga to Mulwala	1939	Weir Road, one lane along the weir wall - originally designated as a stock route. Permanently closed to traffic in 2021.	
	Yarrawonga Rail Bridge	36°00′29″S 145°59′59″E	Yarrawonga to Mulwala	1989	railway bridge, replaced earlier wooden bridge and earthen embankment	
	Mulwala Bridge	36°00′20″S 146°00′18″E	Yarrawonga to Mulwala	1924	Crosses Lake Mulwala, 488 metres (1,601 ft)	
	John Foord Bridge	36°00′25″S 146°23′43″E	Wahgunyah to Corowa	1892	retained for local traffic	
	Federation Bridge	35°59′8″S 146°24′40″E	Wahgunyah to Corowa	2005	Two lanes wide and 195 metres (639.8 ft) long, with a 95 metres (311.7 ft) approach bridge on the NSW side.	
	John Conway Bourke Bridge	35°59′37″S 146°37′15″E	Howlong	2001		Commemorates the first carrier of mail from Sydney in 1838 to what would later be called Melbourne
	Lincoln Causeway/Union Bridge	36°05′29″S 146°54′23″E	Wodonga to Albury	1961 (though first bridge opened 1861)	4 lanes, 92 metres (301.8 ft) long, widened 1990	
	Albury-Wodonga Railway Bridge	36°05′59″S 146°54′34″E	Wodonga to Albury	1888	Originally double track - one Broad gauge plus one Standard gauge. Broad gauge track disconnected following conversion of the North East Victorian broad gauge line to standard gauge in 2010.	
	Spirit of Progress Bridge	36°06′02″S 146°54′34″E	Wodonga to Albury	2006	New Hume Highway bridge, named after the Spirit of Progress train.	
	Island Road Bridge	36°04′42″S 146°57′20″E	Thurgoona to the Island			
	Heywood Bridge	36°05′57″S 147°01′19″E	Hume Dam to Bonegilla	1984	124 metres (406.8 ft) long. Between Albury and here there is a bridge near the airport, to Bonegilla Island.	
	Bonegilla Bridge	36°06′26″S 147°01′56″E	Hume Dam to Bonegilla	1941	The Hume Weir wall, now closed to motorised traffic. single lane, 91 metres (298.6 ft)	
	Bethanga Bridge	36°05′25″S 147°03′31″E	Bellbridge	1930	on the Riverina Highway across Lake Hume	
	Wymah Ferry	36°02′23″S 147°15′56″E	Wymah		upstream end of Lake Hume, 2-car capacity, 11 tonne (12.1 t) load limit	
	Jingellic Bridge	35°55′53″S 147°42′5″E	Jingellic	1959	156 metres (511.8 ft)	
	Tintaldra Bridge	36°2′44″S 147°55′56″E	Tintaldra	1959	steel truss bridge 185 metres (607 ft)	
	Towong Bridge	36°7′26″S 147°59′46″E	Towong	1938	61 metres (200.1 ft) long	
	Bringenbrong Bridge	36°10′8″S 148°01′31″E	Bringenbrong	1961	87 metres (285.4 ft) long, near Corryong on the Alpine Way	
	Indi Bridge	36°14′46″S 148°02′5″E		1961	Connects the Indi homestead in NSW to the Upper Murray Road. Steel girder, with concrete piles and a concrete deck. Single lane, 3.7 metres (12 ft) wide.	
	Biggara Bridge	36°17′46″S 148°02′17″E	Biggara	1951		
	Tom Groggin Bridge	36.522085°S 148.136998°E	Tom Groggin		Private bridges to Tom Groggin Station: low level for vehicles; higher-level suspension bridge for pedestrians when the other is flooded.	

== See also ==
- List of Australian ferries
- List of Darling River distances
- List of Murray River distances
- List of Murrumbidgee River distances
- Murray–Darling basin includes useful chart of tributaries
