= Wymah Ferry =

Cable ferry in Australia

Coordinates: 36.039817°S 147.265613°E

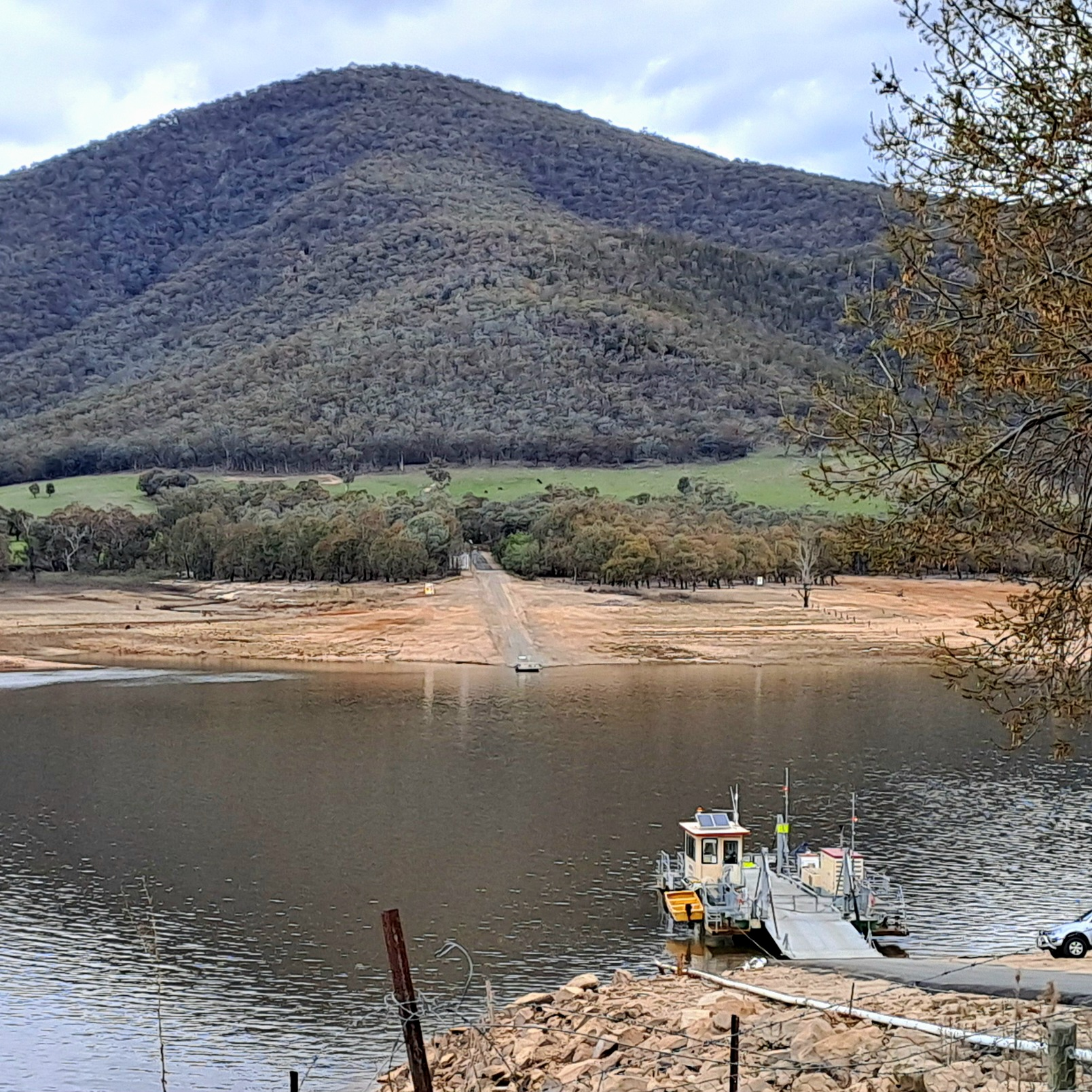
- Locale: Wymah, New South Wales – Granya, Victoria in Australia
- Waterway: Murray River
- Transit type: Cable ferry
- Owner: Government of New South Wales; Government of Victoria
- Operator: Transport for NSW
- Began operation: 19th century
- Yearly vehicles: 8,011 (FY2022-23)

The Wymah Ferry is a cable ferry across the upper reach of Lake Hume, on the Murray River and on the border between the Australian states of New South Wales and Victoria. The ferry crosses from the community of Wymah in Greater Hume Council, to Granya in Towong Shire Council, Victoria, and is approximately 35 kilometres (22 mi) east of Albury.

The ferry is controlled by Transport for NSW, but is jointly funded by both states. It operates seven days a week, and is free of tolls. From September to April, the ferry operates on demand from 06:00 to 21:00, and from 07:00 to 20:00 for the rest of the year, with several breaks during the day. If the ferry is not in operation, the alternatives are an 85 kilometres (53 mi) detour downstream via the Bethanga Bridge and Albury, or a 120 kilometres (75 mi) detour upstream via Jingellic.

The ferry route probably dates back to the 19th century. When the Hume Dam was completed in 1936, the range of the ferry had to be increased in order to cross the raised and widened water level of Lake Hume.

The previous ferry boat was constructed principally of wood, and built in 1946. The hull was 10.7 metres (35 ft) long and 5.1 metres (17 ft) wide, with 4.95 metres (16.2 ft) long landing ramps at each end. The engine house was cantilevered approximately 1.1 metres (3 ft 7 in) out to the side. Because of the variation in the water level in Lake Hume, the ferry operated between floating landing stages which are attached to each bank. The position of the landing stages was adjusted by hand winch to suit the level of the water. It was retired on 14 May 2013 and replaced by a new vessel.

The Wymah Ferry is one of only two cable ferries to cross the section of the Murray River between New South Wales and Victoria, the other being the Speewa Ferry nearly 500 kilometres (310 mi) downstream. However, there are another 11 such ferries further downstream, on the South Australian section of the river.

In April 2019 the service was temporarily suspended due to low water levels.

== See also ==
- Murray River crossings

| Next crossing upstream | Murray River | Next crossing downstream |
| Jingellic Bridge | Wymah Ferry | Bethanga Bridge |
