= Lankeys Creek, New South Wales =

Lankeys Creek
- Town
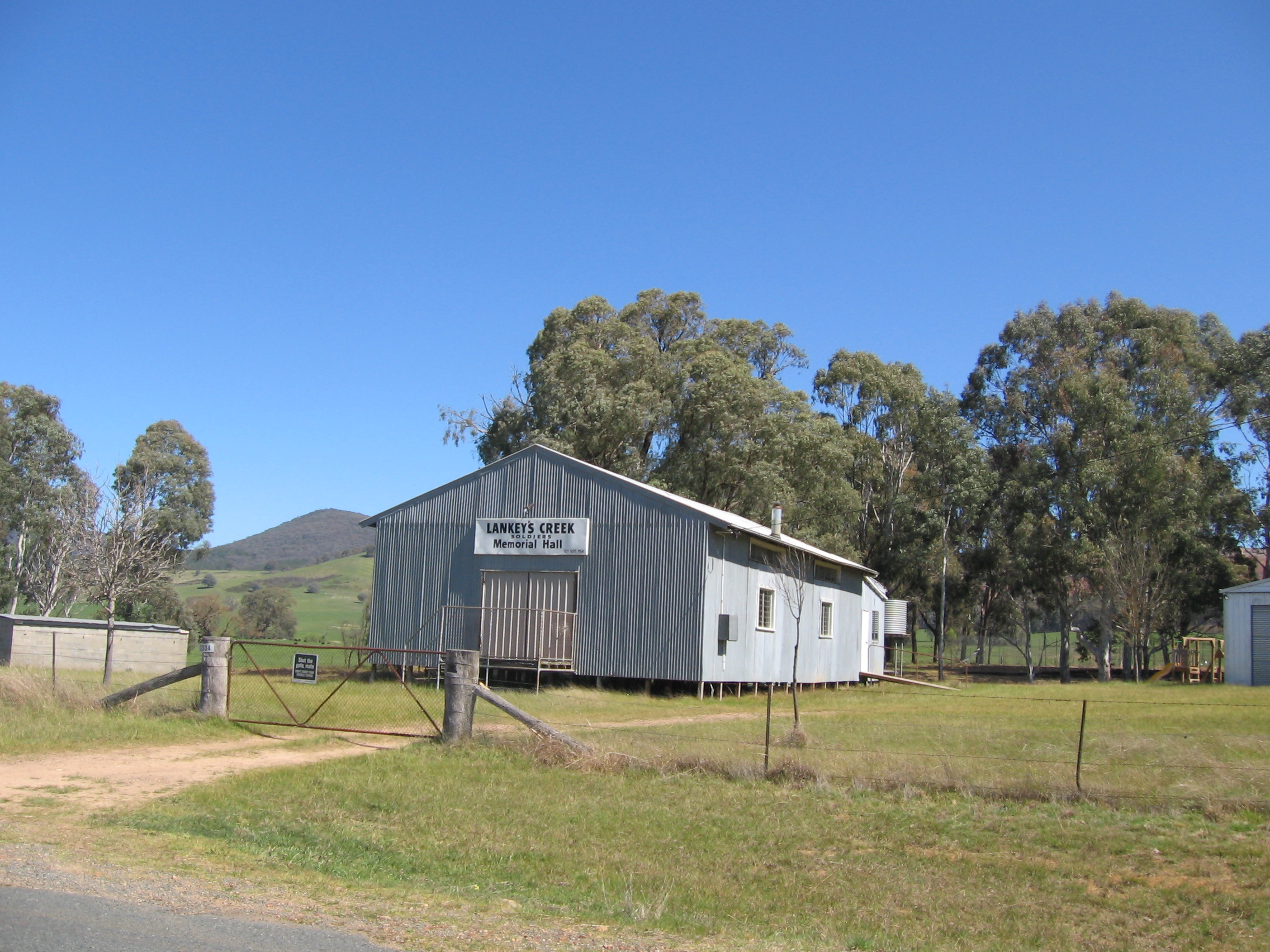
- Memorial Hall

- Coordinates: 35°49′S 147°40′E
- Country: Australia
- State: New South Wales
- LGA: Greater Hume Shire Council
- Location: 18 km (11 mi) from Jingellic; 36 km (22 mi) from Holbrook

Government
  - State electorate: Albury
  - Federal division: Farrer
- Elevation: 355–591 m (1,165–1,939 ft)

Population
  - Total: 60 (SAL 2021)
- Postcode: 2644
- County: Goulburn
- Mean max temp: 19.1 °C (66.4 °F)
- Mean min temp: 4.4 °C (39.9 °F)
- Annual rainfall: 906.3 mm (35.68 in)

Lankeys Creek is a rural community in the east part of the Riverina. It is situated by road, about 18 kilometres north west of Jingellic and 36 kilometres south east of Holbrook.

Lankeys Creek Post Office was open briefly in 1890, reopened in 1906 and closed in 1961.

== Climate ==
Being the first of the higher ground on the South West Slopes in a westerly wind, the area experiences cool maximum temperatures relative to its altitude (particularly in winter), averaging just 9.9 °C (49.8 °F) in July at the Brookfield Forest Station. The site was located in pine plantation country at 457 metres (1,499 ft) above sea level and operated from 1938 until 1968.

Climate data for Brookfield Forest Station (1938–1968); 457 m AMSL; 35.80° S, 147.93° E
Month	Jan	Feb	Mar	Apr	May	Jun	Jul	Aug	Sep	Oct	Nov	Dec	Year
Mean daily maximum °C (°F)	28.7 (83.7)	27.7 (81.9)	24.8 (76.6)	19.1 (66.4)	14.5 (58.1)	10.9 (51.6)	9.9 (49.8)	11.8 (53.2)	15.6 (60.1)	18.6 (65.5)	21.8 (71.2)	26.0 (78.8)	19.1 (66.4)
Mean daily minimum °C (°F)	10.1 (50.2)	10.1 (50.2)	7.5 (45.5)	3.9 (39.0)	1.4 (34.5)	0.2 (32.4)	−0.8 (30.6)	0.3 (32.5)	1.7 (35.1)	4.0 (39.2)	6.0 (42.8)	7.9 (46.2)	4.4 (39.9)
Average precipitation mm (inches)	56.0 (2.20)	47.2 (1.86)	65.5 (2.58)	65.6 (2.58)	86.2 (3.39)	82.3 (3.24)	99.0 (3.90)	92.3 (3.63)	81.6 (3.21)	98.7 (3.89)	70.8 (2.79)	60.1 (2.37)	906.3 (35.68)
Average precipitation days (≥ 0.2 mm)	6.0	5.6	6.3	8.0	10.8	12.7	13.9	14.5	10.7	11.9	8.5	7.3	116.2
Source: Australian Bureau of Meteorology; Brookfield Forest Station

Climate data for Carabost Forest Headquarters (1938–1969, rainfall 1938–1997); 580 m AMSL; 35.65° S, 147.80° E
Month	Jan	Feb	Mar	Apr	May	Jun	Jul	Aug	Sep	Oct	Nov	Dec	Year
Mean daily maximum °C (°F)	28.0 (82.4)	27.2 (81.0)	24.1 (75.4)	18.7 (65.7)	13.7 (56.7)	10.8 (51.4)	9.1 (48.4)	10.8 (51.4)	14.3 (57.7)	18.0 (64.4)	21.1 (70.0)	25.4 (77.7)	18.4 (65.2)
Mean daily minimum °C (°F)	11.0 (51.8)	11.2 (52.2)	9.0 (48.2)	5.6 (42.1)	3.2 (37.8)	1.7 (35.1)	0.2 (32.4)	1.7 (35.1)	3.2 (37.8)	5.5 (41.9)	7.0 (44.6)	9.0 (48.2)	5.7 (42.3)
Average precipitation mm (inches)	56.4 (2.22)	48.6 (1.91)	61.2 (2.41)	72.6 (2.86)	96.4 (3.80)	92.8 (3.65)	112.5 (4.43)	107.6 (4.24)	84.4 (3.32)	100.1 (3.94)	70.5 (2.78)	60.1 (2.37)	966.5 (38.05)
Average precipitation days (≥ 0.2 mm)	5.1	4.7	5.4	7.0	9.7	10.7	12.6	13.0	10.1	10.1	7.8	6.2	102.4
Source: Australian Bureau of Meteorology; Carabost Forest Headquarters
