= Talmalmo =

- Town
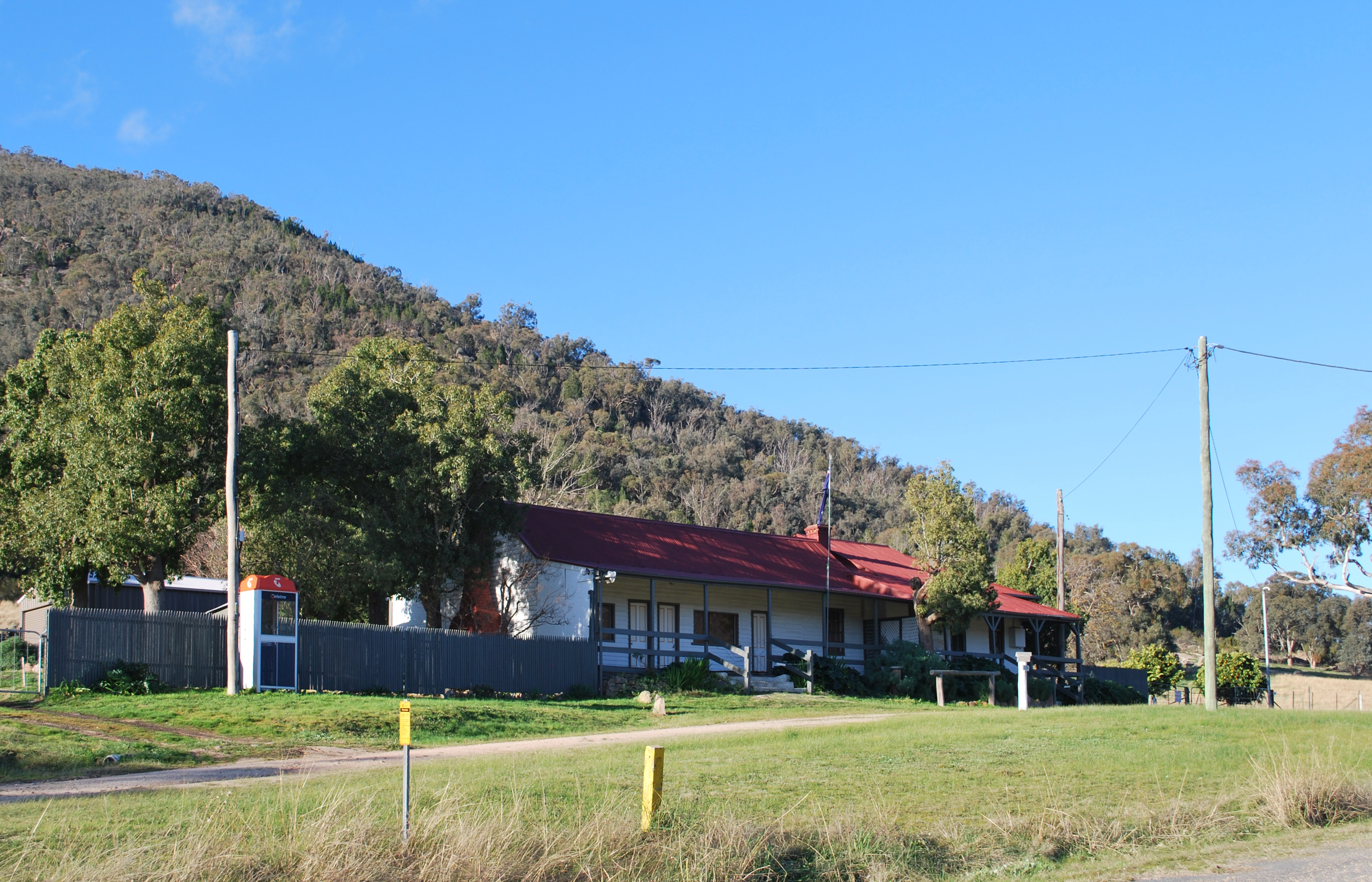
- The former Dora Dora Hotel at Talmalmo

- Coordinates: 35°57′S 147°30′E
- Country: Australia
- State: New South Wales
- LGA: Greater Hume Shire Council
- Location: 21 km (13 mi) from Jingellic; 23 km (14 mi) from Wymah

Government
  - State electorate: Albury
- Elevation: 321 m (1,053 ft)

Population
  - Total: 44 (SAL 2021)
- Postcode: 2640
- County: Goulburn

Talmalmo is a town in New South Wales, Australia, 54 kilometres (34 mi) north-east of Albury, located within the Greater Hume Shire Council local government area. It is in the south-east of the Riverina region, close to the border with Victoria. By road, it is situated about 21 kilometres west of Jingellic and 23 kilometres east of Wymah. Talmalmo recorded a population of 44 at the 2021 census.

Talmalmo Post Office opened on 18 January 1904 and closed in 1971.

== Notable residents ==
- George Fury, multiple Australian Rally Champion and Australian Touring Car Championship driver
