= Wymah, New South Wales =

Wymah
- Town
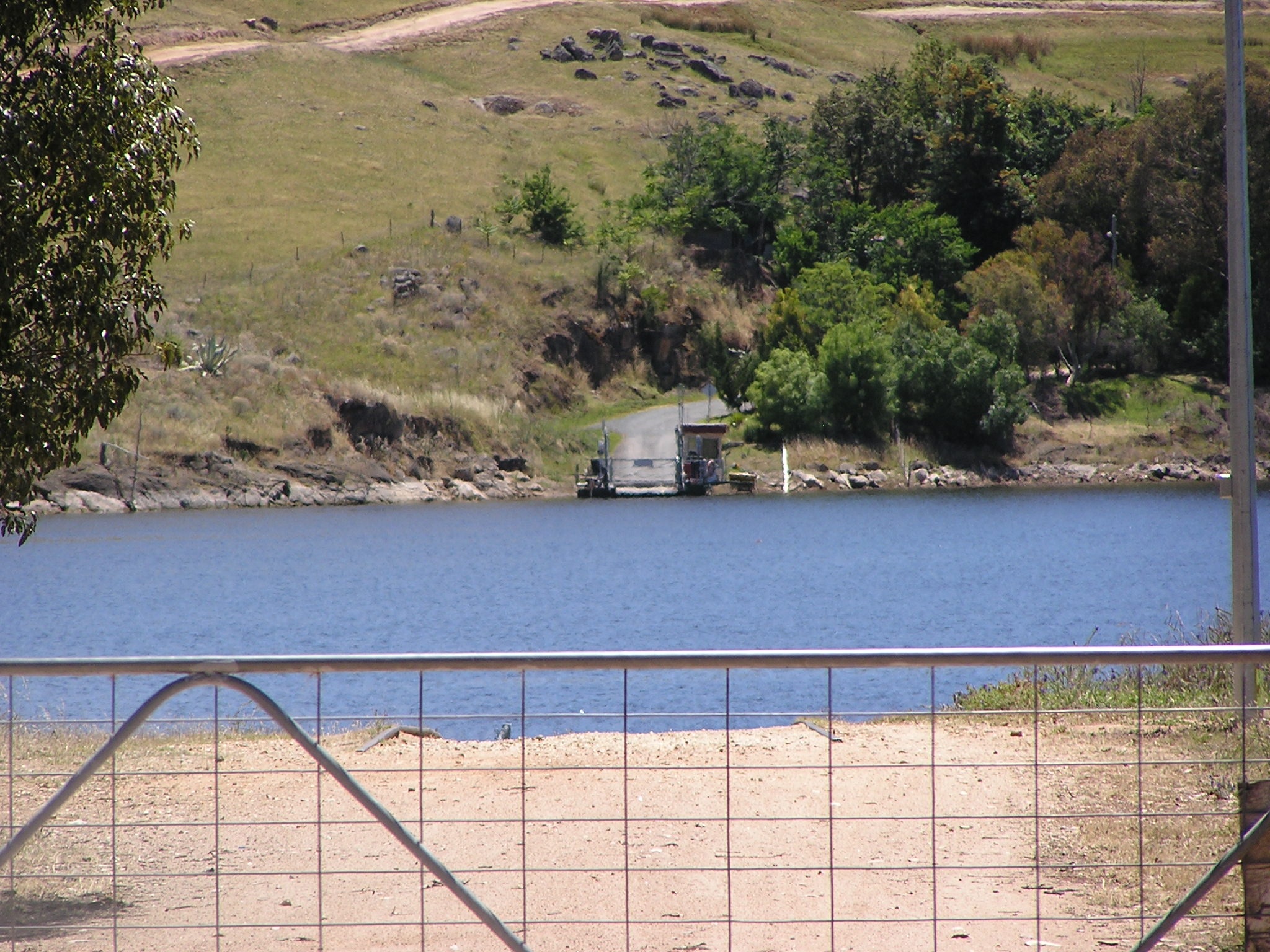
- Wymah ferry December 2005 (when the Hume Dam was nearly full)

- Coordinates: 35°59′42″S 147°16′12″E
- Country: Australia
- State: New South Wales
- LGA: Greater Hume Shire Council
- Location: 11 km (6.8 mi) from Bowna; 23 km (14 mi) from Talmalmo

Government
  - State electorate: Albury
  - Federal division: Farrer

Population
  - Total: 30 (SAL 2021)
- Postcode: 2640
- County: Goulburn

Wymah /ˈwaɪmə/ is a rural community in the south-east part of the Riverina very close to the border of Victoria, Australia. It is situated by road, about 11 kilometres (7 mi) south of Bowna and 23 kilometres (14 mi) west of Talmalmo. Wymah is situated on the Wymah River Road accessible from Bowna. At the 2016 census, Wymah had a population of 37. The population had dropped to 30 at the 2021 census.

The place name is derived from the Aboriginal word meaning "White Cockatoo". Wagra Post Office opened on 1 February 1879, was renamed Wymah in 1912 and closed in 1952.

The Wymah Ferry crosses the Murray River when the Hume Dam is full; in low water conditions, the ferry cannot operate.
