= Ballbank =

- Town
- Coordinates: 35°28′12″S 143°56′42″E
- Country: Australia
- State: New South Wales
- LGA: Murray River Council
- Location: 839 km (521 mi) from Sydney; 330 km (210 mi) from Griffith; 28 km (17 mi) from Barham; 5 km (3.1 mi) from Murrabit

Government
  - State electorate: Murray
  - Federal division: Farrer
- County: Wakool

Ballbank is an area in the south western part of the Riverina and situated about 5 kilometres (3.1 mi) north from Murrabit and 25 kilometres (16 mi) north west from Barham.

Ballbank used to be a part of the Stony Crossing railway line and lies between Murrabit and Nacurrie.
