= Riverina Highway =

Highway in New South Wales, Australia

Riverina Highway New South Wales
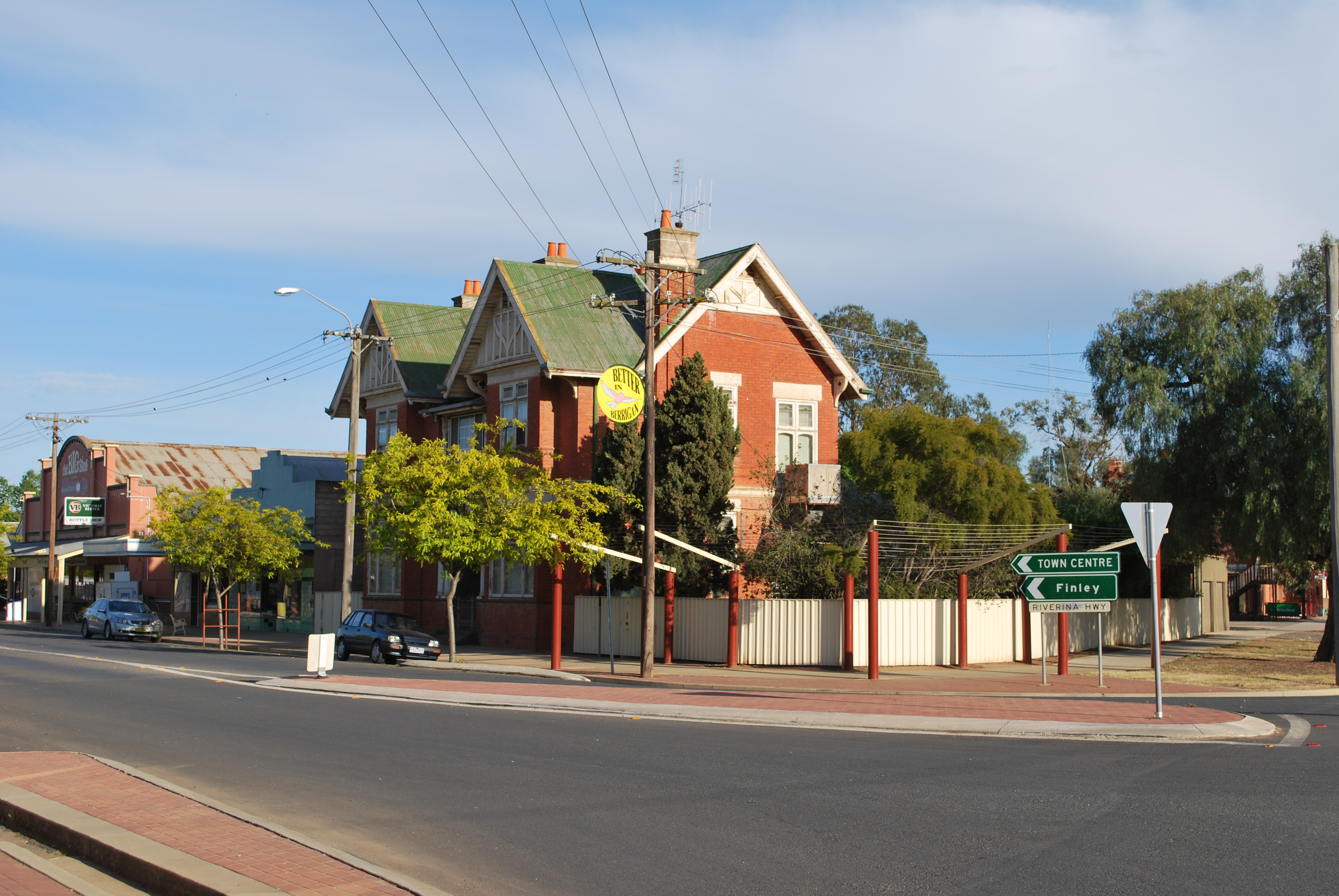
- Riverina Highway through Berrigan (as Chanter Street, where it meets Jerilderie Street)

General information
- Type: Highway
- Length: 220 km (137 mi)
- Gazetted: August 1928 (as Main Road 212); March 1938 (as State Highway 20)
- Route number(s): B58 (2013–present) (East Albury–Deniliquin)
- Former route number: National Route 58 (1974–2013); Entire route

Major junctions
- East end: Murray River Road; Hume Weir, New South Wales
- Hume Highway; Newell Highway
- West end: Cobb Highway; Deniliquin, New South Wales

Location(s)
- Major settlements: Albury, Howlong, Berrigan, Finley

Highway system
- Highways in Australia; National Highway • Freeways in Australia; Highways in New South Wales

Riverina Highway is a 220-kilometre (140 mi)-long state highway located in the Riverina region of New South Wales, Australia. The road was constructed over several decades with final asphalt concrete sealing completed during the 1960s.

== Route ==
The eastern terminus of Riverina Highway is located on the eastern shore of the Hume Weir, which impounds the Murray River, east of Albury. The Bethanga Bridge carries the highway across the weir as the highway generally heads west by northwest, following the course of the Murray River to reach its western terminus at Deniliquin. West of Albury, the highway passes through or near the Riverina towns of Howlong, Corowa, Berrigan and Finley where it has a short concurrency with Newell Highway. From this point the highway follows the Mulwala Canal westward until it reaches Deniliquin, terminating at its junction with Cobb Highway.

The highway passes irrigated farms, orchards and vineyards. It links this area to major markets in Sydney via Hume Highway in Albury, and in Melbourne via the C371 in Berrigan or Cobb Highway in Deniliquin. The highway is also a popular tourist route with scenic countryside, fishing and historic spots along its path.

== History ==
The passing of the Main Roads Act of 1924 through the Parliament of New South Wales provided for the declaration of Main Roads, roads partially funded by the State government through the Main Roads Board (later the Department of Main Roads, and eventually Transport for NSW). Main Road No. 131 was declared from Hopefield to Lowesdale (and continuing north via Daysdale to Urana), and Main Road No. 212 was declared from the intersection with Hume Highway in Albury, via Howlong to Corowa (and continuing westwards via Tocumwal and Tuppal to the intersection with Moama-Booligal Road, today Cobb Highway, in Deniliquin), on the same day, 8 August 1928.

The Department of Main Roads, which had succeeded the New South Wales MRB in 1932, later truncated the western end of Main Road 212 to terminate at Tocumwal, and Main Road No. 331 was declared from Deniliquin via Finley to Berrigan on the same day, 21 February 1933. Main Road No. 355 was declared on 23 September 1936, from Albury to the state border with Victoria at Bethanga.

State Highway 20 was declared on 16 March 1938, from the intersection with State Highway 17 (later known as Newell Highway) at Tocumwal via Corowa, Howlong and Albury to the state border with Victoria at Bethanga, subsuming Main Roads 212 and 355. Its western end was re-aligned on 1 February 1950, running from Corowa via Hopefield, Lowesdale, Berrigan and Finley to Denilquin (subsuming Main Road 331); Main Road 131 was truncated to Lowesdale as a result, and the former alignment to Tocumwal was re-declared as Main Road 86 (between the intersection with State Highway 20 just north of Corowa to the state border with Victoria just outside Wahgunyah) and Main Road 550 (between Corowa and Tocumwal). State Highway 20 was named Riverina Highway on 15 September 1954, after the Riverina region the highway runs through.

Riverina Highway was signed National Route 58 across its entire length in 1974. With the conversion to the newer alphanumeric system in 2013, this was replaced with route B58 between East Albury and Deniliquin; from East Albury eastwards to the Victorian border has been left unallocated.

== Major junctions ==
| State | LGA | Location | km | mi | Destinations | Notes |
|---|---|---|---|---|---|---|
| Victoria | Towong | Bellbridge | 0 | 0.0 | Murray River Road (C542) – Towong, Tallangatta | Eastern terminus of highway; road continues east as Murray River Road |
| State border | | | 0 | 0.0 | Victoria – New South Wales state border | |
| New South Wales | Murray River | | 0 | 0.0 | Bethanga Bridge | |
| New South Wales | Albury | Lake Hume Village | 3 | 1.9 | Trout Farm Road, to Bonegilla Road (C541) – Bonegilla | T intersection |
| New South Wales | Albury | East Albury | 16 | 9.9 | Hume Highway (M31) – Holbrook, Goulburn, Sydney, Melbourne | Diamond interchange; eastern terminus of route B58 |
| New South Wales | Albury | Albury | 16.2 | 10.1 | Young Street (north) – North Albury; Guinea Street (west) – Albury | Controlled four-way intersection |
| New South Wales | Albury | Albury | 17 | 11 | Atkins Street – Albury | T intersection |
| New South Wales | Albury | Albury | 19 | 12 | Hume Street (west) – Albury; Wodonga Place (south), to Lincoln Causeway (C319) – Wodonga | 4-way intersection |
| New South Wales | Albury | Albury | 19.2 | 11.9 | Wodonga Place (north) – Albury; Smollett Street (east) – Albury | Roundabout |
| New South Wales | Federation | Howlong | 48 | 30 | Hawkins Street (west) – Howlong; Sturt Street (south), to Chiltern-Howlong Road (C381) – Chiltern | 4-way intersection |
| New South Wales | Federation | Hopefield | 69 | 43 | Honour Avenue – Corowa, Rutherglen | T intersection |
| New South Wales | Berrigan | Berrigan | 141 | 88 | Jerilderie Road – Jerilderie | T intersection |
| New South Wales | Berrigan | Finley | 163 | 101 | Newell Highway (A39 south) – Tocumwal, Shepparton | T intersection, concurrency with Newell Highway |
| New South Wales | Berrigan | Finley | 163.5 | 101.6 | Newell Highway (A39 north) – Narrandera, West Wyalong, Dubbo | T intersection, concurrency with Newell Highway |
| New South Wales | Edward River | Deniliquin | 220 | 140 | Cobb Highway (B75) – Wilcannia, Hay, Echuca | Roundabout, western terminus of highway and route B58 |
1.000 mi = 1.609 km; 1.000 km = 0.621 mi: Concurrency terminus; Route transition

== See also ==
- Highways in Australia
- Highways in New South Wales
