= Tim Archer =

Australian rules footballer (1897–1990)

Personal information
- Full name: Thomas Timothy Archer
- Born: 13 February 1897; Wagga Wagga, New South Wales
- Died: 24 September 1990 (aged 93)
- Original team: Mangoplah

Playing career^{1}
Years	Club	Games (Goals)
1923–24	St Kilda	22 (12)
- ^{1} Playing statistics correct to the end of 1924.

Thomas Timothy Archer (13 February 1897 – 24 September 1990) was an Australian rules footballer who played with St Kilda in the Victorian Football League (VFL).

In 1925, Archer was appointed as coach of the Hume Weir Football Club in the Ovens and Murray Football League.

Archer returned home in 1926 and played in Mangoplah's 1926 – Wagga United Football Association premiership side that defeated Tootool at The Rock.

In 1934, Archer was elected as President of the Wagga Australian Rules Football Association.

During World War II he served in the Volunteer Defence Corps, enlisting in Sydney in 1942.

Archer would later become the manager of the famous Sydney landmark, Petty's Hotel.
