= Murrabit =

Murrabit Victoria
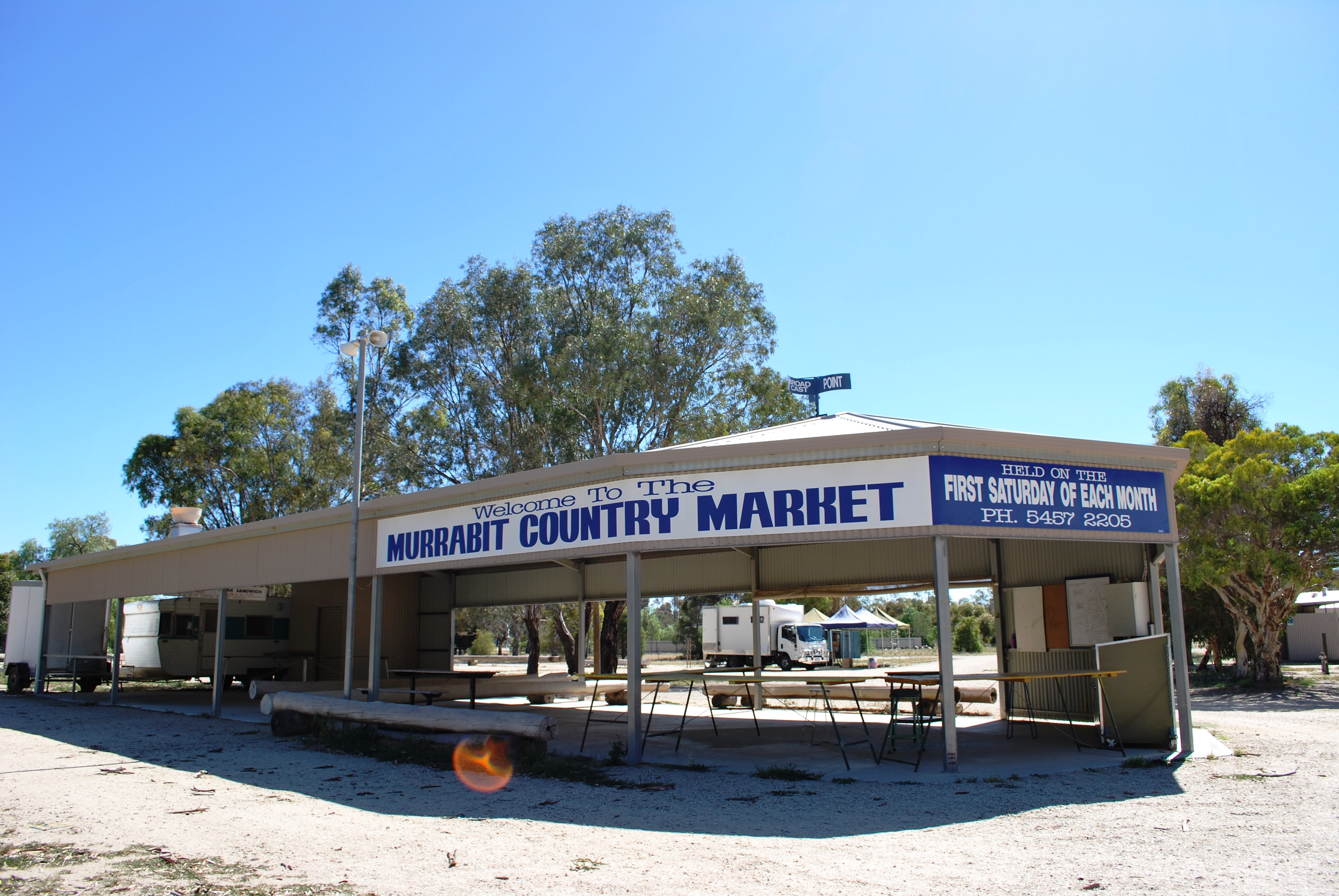
- Site of the Murrabit Country Markets

- Coordinates: 35°31′0″S 143°57′0″E
- Population: 230 (2021 census)
- Postcode(s): 3579
- Location: 305 km (190 mi) NW of Melbourne; 154 km (96 mi) N of Bendigo; 52 km (32 mi) NW of Swan Hill
- LGA(s): Shire of Gannawarra
- State electorate(s): Murray Plains
- Federal division(s): Mallee

Murrabit (/ˈmʌrəbɪt/ MUH-rə-bit) is a town in northern Victoria, Australia. It is on the Murray River, 305 kilometres (190 mi) from the state capital, Melbourne and 52 kilometres (32 mi) from Swan Hill. Murrabit is in the Shire of Gannawarra local government area and at the 2016 census, Murrabit and the surrounding area had a population of 201, declining from 330 just five years earlier.

The township was established in 1925 as a railway station on the Kerang-Stony Crossing rail line. In accordance with the legislation authorising the railway, the town had to be no closer than two miles (3.2 km) from the Victoria-New South Wales border. The railway crossed the Murray River into New South Wales via an historic bridge at Gonn Crossing, just north of the town. The lift-span bridge was opened in 1926 and was used for both rail and road traffic until 1964, but became road only when the railway was closed. A Murrabit Post Office opened on 2 March 1880, but was renamed Murrabit West in 1924 when a new Murrabit post office opened near the railway station.

Murrabit is a major citrus producing area, with many orchards and packing sheds. Dairy is the other major industry with water provided through the Torrumbarry Irrigation System and milk being sold to processing plants at Leitchville and Rochester.

Murrabit is known for its regular country market. The market, held the first Saturday of each month, was established in 1977 and is reputed to be the biggest in regional Victoria.

Golfers play at the course of the Murrabit Golf Club on Murrabit Road.

The town has an Australian rules football club, playing in the Golden Rivers Football League.
