= Bethanga Bridge =

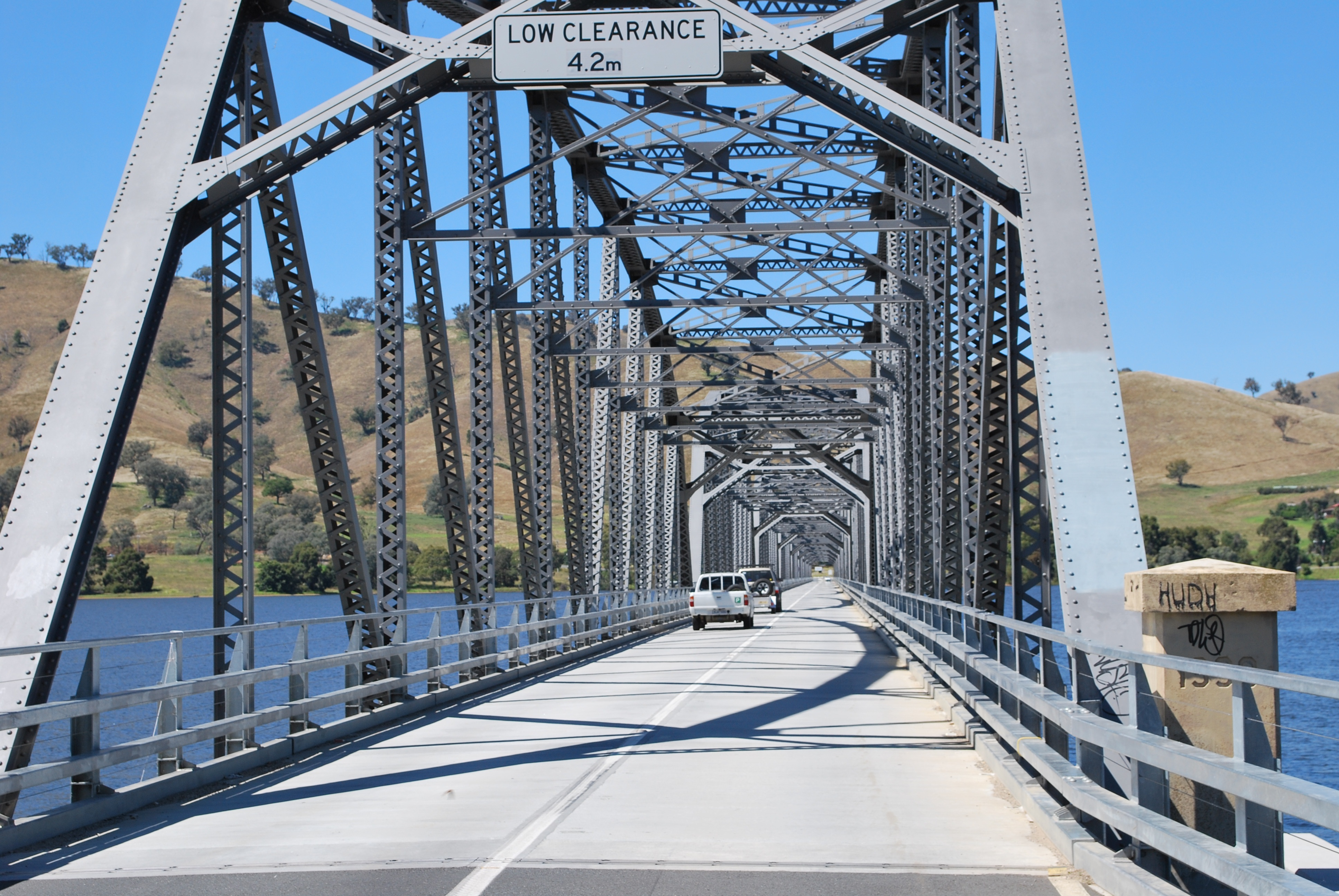
- Bethanga Bridge in 2010
- Coordinates: 36°05′25″S 147°03′32″E
- Carries: Riverina Highway /
- Crosses: Lake Hume
- Locale: Bellbridge and Bethanga, Victoria, Australia
- Named for: Bethanga
- Owner: Transport for NSW; VicRoads
- Maintained by: Transport for NSW

Characteristics
- Design: Pratt truss
- Material: Steel, concrete
- Trough construction: Timber deck replaced by concrete waffle slab in 1961
- Pier construction: Double reinforced concrete pylons
- Total length: 752 metres (2,467 ft)
- Width: 7.7 metres (25 ft)
- Longest span: 82 metres (269 ft)
- No. of spans: 9
- Piers in water: 8
- Clearance above: 4.2 metres (14 ft)
- Clearance below: 25 metres (82 ft)
- No. of lanes: 2

History
- Designer: Percy Allan
- Contracted lead designer: Department of Main Roads
- Engineering design by: NSW Department of Public Works
- Constructed by: Vickers Ruwolt, Melbourne
- Construction start: 1927
- Construction end: 1930
- Construction cost: c. A£194,000 – 210,000
- Opened: September 1930

New South Wales Heritage Register
- Official name: Bethanga Bridge
- Type: State heritage (built)
- Designated: 26 May 2006
- Reference no.: 1750
- Type: Road Bridge
- Category: Transport - Land
- Builders: Vickers Ruwolt, Melbourne

Victorian Heritage Register
- Official name: Bethanga Bridge
- Type: State heritage (built)
- Designated: 14 July 2005
- Reference no.: 12738
- Type: Road Bridge
- Category: Transport – Land; Utilities – Water
- Builders: Vickers Ruwolt, Melbourne

Location
- Interactive map of Bethanga Bridge

The Bethanga Bridge is a steel truss road bridge that carries the Riverina Highway across Lake Hume, an artificial lake on the Murray River in Australia. The dual heritage-listed bridge crosses the border between the Australian states of New South Wales and Victoria, linking the Victorian towns of Bellbridge and Bethanga with the regional New South Wales city of Albury.

== History ==
=== Context ===
The first crossing of the Murray River by white men occurred in November 1824 when Hamilton Hume and William Hovell led an expedition from Yass in search of an overland route to Westernport Bay. Their crossing point was some distance up river from Albury and an obelisk near the river commemorates this. Hume and Hovell came upon the river on 16 November 1824, naming it the Hume River, and inscribing a tree near the riverbank the next day before moving on to the south. In 1829, the explorer Charles Sturt discovered the Hume River downstream at its junction with the Murrumbidgee River. Not realising it was indeed the Hume, he named it the Murray River. Both names persisted for some time, Hume falling into disuse eventually in favour of Murray.

The explorers route was shortly followed by white squatters and their livestock, mainly sheep and cattle. Subsequently, many families took up parcels of grazing land on the rich river flatlands, among the first being William Wyse and Charles Ebden. The drovers track that developed along the line of the advancing squatters, and subsequently by their excess stock returning for sale at Melbourne and Sydney markets, led naturally to the same point Hume and Hovell first sighted the river. Although an easier crossing point could be found 10 miles upstream (where the Hume Dam now stands) the original site by Hume and Hovel's inscribed tree became the popular crossing place for people and stock on their way to new settlements in the south.

Crossing the river during the drier summer months could normally be achieved on foot. When the river was high after heavy rains or snow melting in the mountains crossing became difficult until a log punt was built in 1844. Stock, however, had to swim. The first bridge over the Murray was built in 1860 near the present crossing at Albury. People up and down stream had to find their own fords, or trek back to Albury.

The arrival of the railway from Melbourne in 1873 boosted the district and captured the Southern Riverina markets for Melbourne. The railway line from Sydney reached Albury in 1881, but the Albury-Wodonga Railway Bridge over the Murray was not opened until 1883.

The Bethanga-Talgarno gold and copper field became one of the top copper producers in Victoria although both minerals proved difficult to extract from the intractable ores. The alluvial field was first reported in 1852 and was visited by mining officials in 1854, but the field was not really opened up until the discovery of the New Year's Gift reef on 1 January 1876. This led to a number of highly capitalised mining ventures. Harris and Hollow, a mining partnership from Rutherglen, built a smelting works on the flats of lower Bethanga with a view to smelting copper for the public and opened the first furnace of their Great Eastern Copper Smelting works in January 1878. John Wallace MLC took an interest in the Bethanga mining scene and purchased mining leases and major mines at Bethanga, then built his own smelting works to treat the ore, completing three furnaces by June 1878. The Bethanga Goldfields Ltd company made a takeover in 1895 and both metals were mined and treated. Mining however, continued only sporadically into the 20th century, with further leads opened at Mount Corryong and Mount Talgarno. There was a brief revival in the 1930s and some mines struggled on to at least 1945, but in the latter half of the 20th century mining ceased and the town gradually diminished (Bannear).

The concept of damming Australian rivers for irrigation and flood mitigation was first investigated back in the days of the steamers. The Hume Dam was proposed under the River Murray Waters Agreement, which was signed on 9 September 1914, by the Prime Minister, Joseph Cook, and the Premiers of New South Wales, Victoria and South Australia. The first sod was turned by His Excellency, the Right Honourable Sir Ronald Crawford Munro-Ferguson, Governor-General of Australia, on 28 November 1919.

H. V. Beresford was construction engineer on the Hume Weir from about 1925, but died while still engaged on the project in 1927. At the height of construction, more than 1100 workers were employed at the site. These workers were housed in two fully serviced towns adjacent to the site, one on either side of the river.

Construction of the weir took seventeen years with the reservoir being completed and officially opened by the Right Honourable Lord Gowrie, Governor of NSW, on 21 November 1936 and a plaque on the northern pier of the dam commemorates the occasion. The Bethanga Bridge was evidently constructed in the middle of this period, probably when water backing-up behind the rising dam wall, began to reach the low level bridge at Bethanga.

Three engineers of note were involved in formulating the agreement, Ernest de Burgh, the Chief Engineer of the Water Supply Branch of the NSW Public Works Department, J. S. Detheridge the Commissioner, State Rivers and Water Supply of Victoria, and G. Stewart in South Australia. The initial designs for Hume Dam were prepared by de Burgh and Detheridge. NSW was responsible for construction of the concrete dam and the State Rivers and Water Supply Commission of Victoria was responsible for the southern earth embankments.

Another Victorian engineer, Ettore Checchi (1853–1946) was closely connected with the Hume Dam project in the 1920s and 30s. However, as his skills were with hydrographic work, it is unclear what contribution he had to the associated structures such as Bethanga Bridge. The State Rivers and Water supply Commission undertook at least some of the Hume Weir works in conjunction with the NSW Public Works Department. The River Murray Commission evidently had an overriding supervision of the works, but engineering and design details were left to the established public works engineers in the two states.

The heavy cost of Victoria's irrigation infrastructure lead to a parliamentary inquiry into the commission's finances in 1928, and recommendations against further irrigation investment in an era of low export returns from primary produce. However, the Hume scheme appears to have been immune to any cuts due to the State - Federal agreement and advanced stage of the project. The NSW Department of Public Works carried out modifications between 1950 and 1961 to enlarge the dam to about twice its original size to the present capacity of 3,038 gigalitres (668×10^{9} imp gal; 803×10^{9} US gal) to accommodate diverted water from the Snowy Mountains Scheme.

=== The place ===
As a result of the construction of the weir, the water level in the Murray River backed up behind the dam to permanently inundate the floodplain, which was up to several kilometres wide in many places. Although confirmation of the construction authority is yet to be found, there is later evidence in the form of lantern slides showing the construction of the bridge and clearly intended for public presentation, that the bridge was substantially the work of the SRWSC. The involvement of the NSW Public Works Department is also implied by photographs of components fabricated by Charles Ruwolt and Sons held by Museum Victoria. It is therefore very likely that the New South Wales Public Works Department and Victorian State Rivers and Water supply commission were jointly responsible for the design and construction, as was the case with the Hume Dam itself.

Bethanga Bridge is roughly contemporary with and is similar in design to the Yarrawonga Bridge at Lake Mulwala, which was designed by NSW Department of Main Roads Engineer Percy Allen and constructed in 1924, also as a result of the creation of an artificial lake on the Murray River. The other prominent engineers involved in the Hume Project, Ettore Checchi, Ernest deBurgh, and J. S. Detheridge, were water supply engineers or had ceased to be involved when the bridge was built.

There was a pattern in NSW/Victoria relationships over the Murray River border for NSW to design Murray River bridges, and Victoria to build them. Other examples of the arrangement can be found in the Swan Hill bridge and many timber bridges. Bethanga Bridge is similar to other large NSW bridges such as the Hawkesbury bridges, and uncharacteristic of Victorian bridge design practice.

The sequence of SRWSC lantern slides show the progressive construction of the Bethanga Bridge. Construction commenced in 1927 with clearance of the foundation sites and piling. By 1928 the piers were well under way and staging commenced from each bank. By 1929 all the piers were in place and waters had risen to the base of the piers. Erection of the trusses was underway. Falsework of underslung, divided Warren-type, metal trusses supported on three intermediate steel lattice towers, were used as staging for erecting the Pratt trusses. These were assembled in situ with the use of a travelling crane running across the falsework and hot riveting of preformed, punched and cut angle and flat section steel. As the permanent trusses were completed the staging was dismantled and moved on to the next span. Steel work for the bridge was fabricated at least in part, by Vickers Ruwolt of Burnley Melbourne. Photographs of components such as the truss members and bearings are in the collection of Museum Victoria. At least one of the main trusses was trial assembled at Vickers Ruwolt's Burnley works, probably one of the largest structures to be erected in this fashion.

The bridge was clearly seen as a landmark and complementary to the Hume Dam itself in terms of national pride and potential tourist value. The State Rivers documented the bridge's construction and produced a series of lantern slides showing progress. A number of hand coloured slides and images were produced of the finished bridge to show it at its most impressive. The Victorian Railways also produced its own series of photographs in the 1940s and 50s presenting the bridge as part of a dramatic landscape and engineering achievement, probably for promoting tourist visits (by train) to the region. The bridge has been included in several Postcard series of the natural and man-made features of Albury in the 1950s and 60s under titles such as A Souvenir of Beautiful Albury. The bridge was constructed at a cost of c. A£194,000 – 210,000.

The 13.7-metre (45 ft) approach span on the New South Wales side was constructed in 1963 as part of the upgrading of the Hume Dam.

The town of Bellbridge at the southern end of the bridge, was created to replace facilities inundated by the reservoir. The bridge is currently managed by River Murray Water, although it is understood that the Roads & Traffic Authority, VicRoads and River Murray Water are negotiating on the future management responsibility for the bridge. A current 33-tonne (36-short-ton; 32-long-ton) load limit applies and recent tenders have been advertised for the cleaning and repainting of the bridge.

== Description ==
The Bethanga Bridge is a road bridge over a flooded section of a Murray River valley that now forms part of the Hume Dam. The bridge consists of nine spans of 82 metres (269 ft), each span being supported between double reinforced concrete pylons by a riveted steel camel back Pratt truss plus a 14-metre (46 ft) approach span on the New South Wales side. The overall span is 752 metres (2,467 ft). The road deck was initially timber but was replaced in 1961 with the current concrete waffle slab deck. The road deck is 7.7 metres (25 ft) wide. In 1961 the bridge deck and truss structure was also raised by 300 millimetres (12 in) in response to the upgrading of Hume Dam and works to increase the storage capacity of the dam. In 2005 the waffle slab decking was replaced to raise their load capacity, new guard rails were installed and the NSW approach to the bridge was widened for safety reasons. These 2005 works were undertaken with the joint advice and approval of Heritage Victoria and the NSW Heritage Office.

Bethanga Bridge comprises riveted steel Pratt through trusses on multiple reinforced concrete piers and reinforced concrete "waffle slab" deck on steel beams. There are nine identical principle spans of arched upper cord giving a truss variable depth. This form is also known as "Hog-backed" Camel-back" and "Parker" truss in the USA. There are overhead diagonally braced frames and under deck diagonal "X" bracing between riveted plate cross girder beams. The short approach span on the NSW side has RSJ beams with straight transverse cross-braces. The main truss spans have ten bays with nine vertical compression chords and eight diagonal tension chords.

The Murray River boundary between New South Wales and Victoria is on the southern bank of the river. All structures of the river are considered to be in New South Wales. Because of its unique location, over the waters of a dam with the border running down the centre of the body of water, the Bethanga Bridge is the only built structure shared by both New South Wales and Victoria and listed on both the New South Wales State Heritage Register and the Victorian Heritage Database.

=== Condition ===
The road deck was initially timber but was replaced in 1961 with a concrete waffle slab deck. In 1961 the bridge deck and truss structure was also raised by 300 millimetres (12 in) in response to the upgrading of Hume Dam and works to increase the storage capacity of the dam. In 2005 the waffle slab decking was replaced to raise the load capacity, new guard rails were installed and the NSW approach to the bridge was widened for safety reasons. These 2005 works were undertaken with the joint advice and approval of Heritage Victoria and the NSW Heritage Office.

The Pratt truss was an American style bridge truss that began the tide of change from British to American bridge technology in the nineteenth century. The Bethanga example comes from a period when Pratt trusses were an established design alternative, favoured by railways but generally shunned in Victorian road bridge design. It is a type of truss in which vertical web members are in compression and diagonal web members in tension. Many possible configurations include pitched, flat, or camelback top chords. It may be recognised by diagonal members which appear to form a "V" shape toward the centre of the truss when viewed in profile. Variations include the Baltimore truss and Pennsylvania truss. Elaboration in the form of variable depth from sloping upper chords as in the Camel-back arrangement, reduced the amount of steel required, and also dead weight for a similar strength. The Pratt truss compares to Warren truss and Howe designs in the different compression and tension arrangements of diagonal and vertical members. It was named for Thomas W. and Caleb Pratt (Boston railway engineers), who were issued a patent for a truss bearing their name in April 1844.

The overall length is given in VicRoads inventory as 733 metres (2,405 ft) although a deck length of 752.4 metres (2,469 ft) and total length of 750 metres (2,461 ft) in their inspection system appears more probable. The nine truss spans are each 82 metres (269 ft) with the NSW approach span being 12.5 metres (41 ft); clear height is 25 metres (82 ft) and width 7.7 metres (25 ft). Concrete endposts frame the entry to the bridge. The construction date is cast in the one end post.

The original wooden road surface has been raised once and twice replaced, the railings replaced and the NSW approach modified. Nevertheless, Bethanga Bridge remains substantially the same structure erected in the 1920s.

== Heritage listing ==
Bethanga Bridge was built between 1927 and 1930 as a joint venture between New South Wales and Victoria as part of the Hume Dam project as a key element of the River Murray Waters Agreement put in place in 1915 by the Victorian, New South Wales, South Australian and Federal governments to regulate the flow of the Murray River as a provision against drought and to ensure that the three states received their agreed share of water.

The use of Pratt trusses is unusual in Victoria, not being readily taken up as a viable bridge design. However they are more common in New South Wales. The use of the Pratt truss in this instance reflects the mode of construction employed during the construction of the Hume Dam whereby the New South Wales Department of Public Works and the Victorian State Rivers and Water Supply Commission were jointly responsible for the design and construction of the bridge. The bridge was designed in New South Wales by Department of Main Roads engineer Percy Allen and the trusses were built by Vickers Ruwolt in Melbourne.

The Murray River boundary between New South Wales and Victoria is the top of the southern bank of the river. As such all structures of the river are considered to be in New South Wales. Because of its unique location, over the waters of a dam with the border running down the centre of the body of water, the Bethanga bridge is the only built structure shared by both New South Wales and Victoria.

Bethanga Bridge is of historical and scientific (technical) significance to New South Wales.

Bethanga Bridge is of historical significance to tNew South Wales for its associations with the construction of Hume Dam. It is also of historical significance for its associations with The River Murray Waters Agreement and the River Murray Commission which had the task of putting the agreement into effect. The Agreement was a landmark document that drew on the cooperation of New South Wales, Victoria and South Australia to regulate the flow of the Murray River.

Bethanga Bridge is of scientific (technical) significance for the unusual use in Victoria of Pratt trusses, a predominantly NSW technology, its construction. The Pratt truss was frequently used in New South Wales but this represents a rare example of its use in Victoria. The use of this system in this instance, its design by New South Wales and construction by Victoria, also represents the cooperation of New South Wales and Victoria in the development and ongoing use of major infrastructure.

Bethanga Bridge was listed on the New South Wales State Heritage Register on 26 May 2006 having satisfied the following criteria.

The place is important in demonstrating the course, or pattern, of cultural or natural history in New South Wales.

Bethanga Bridge is of historical significance to New South Wales for its associations with the construction of Hume Dam, a major national undertaking of the early twentieth century. It is also of historical significance for its associations with The River Murray Waters Agreement and the River Murray Commission which had the task of putting the agreement into effect. The Agreement was a landmark document that drew on the cooperation of New South Wales, Victoria and South Australia to regulate the flow of the Murray River. The bridge reflects the engineering and design approaches of the State Rivers and Water Supply Commission and New South Wales Public Works Department in the late 1920s and the influence of American engineering Practice in the use of the Pratt truss. The bridge is also a significanc marker of the anticipated development that the new Hume Weir was expected to bring to the region, serving, as it did, only a few small farming communities and the copper and gold mining areas of Bethanga and Talarno, which were already in steep decline at the time the bridge was completed.

The place is important in demonstrating aesthetic characteristics and/or a high degree of creative or technical achievement in New South Wales.

Bethanga Bridge is of technical significance for the unusual use in Victoria of Pratt trusses, a predominantly NSW technology based on American engineering practice . The Pratt truss was frequently used in New South Wales but this represents a rare example of its use in Victoria. The use of this system in this instance, its design by New South Wales and construction by Victoria, also represents the cooperation of New South Wales and Victoria in the development and ongoing use of major infrastructure. Bethanga Bridge is a representative example of Pratt Truss design displaying the main characteristics at a scale that demonstrates the effectiveness of the design over long spans and of its repetition to create a bridge of considerable overall length. Its construction methods are also of note in the use of staged construction from abutments along temporary underslung Warren trusses.

The bridge is of aesthetic significance for its dramatic rural setting over a wide expanse of water (when lake levels are high) and occasionally at great heights over broad river flats (when the lake is down). It is also of aesthetic significance for the vast scale and length and the rhythmic patterning of repeated geometric motifs of the trusses.

The place has a strong or special association with a particular community or cultural group in New South Wales for social, cultural or spiritual reasons.

Bethanga Bridge is of local social significance as an important local tourism destination and as the main link between the Bethanga/Granya region and the regional centre of Albury-Wodonga .

The place possesses uncommon, rare or endangered aspects of the cultural or natural history of New South Wales.

As a major bridge built by other than a state road or rail authority, Bethanga Bridge is rare and is the most substantial bridge erected by water authorities. It is the only built structure shared by NSW and Victoria.

=== Engineering heritage ===
The bridge received an Engineering Heritage Marker from Engineers Australia as part of its Engineering Heritage Recognition Program.

== Gallery ==
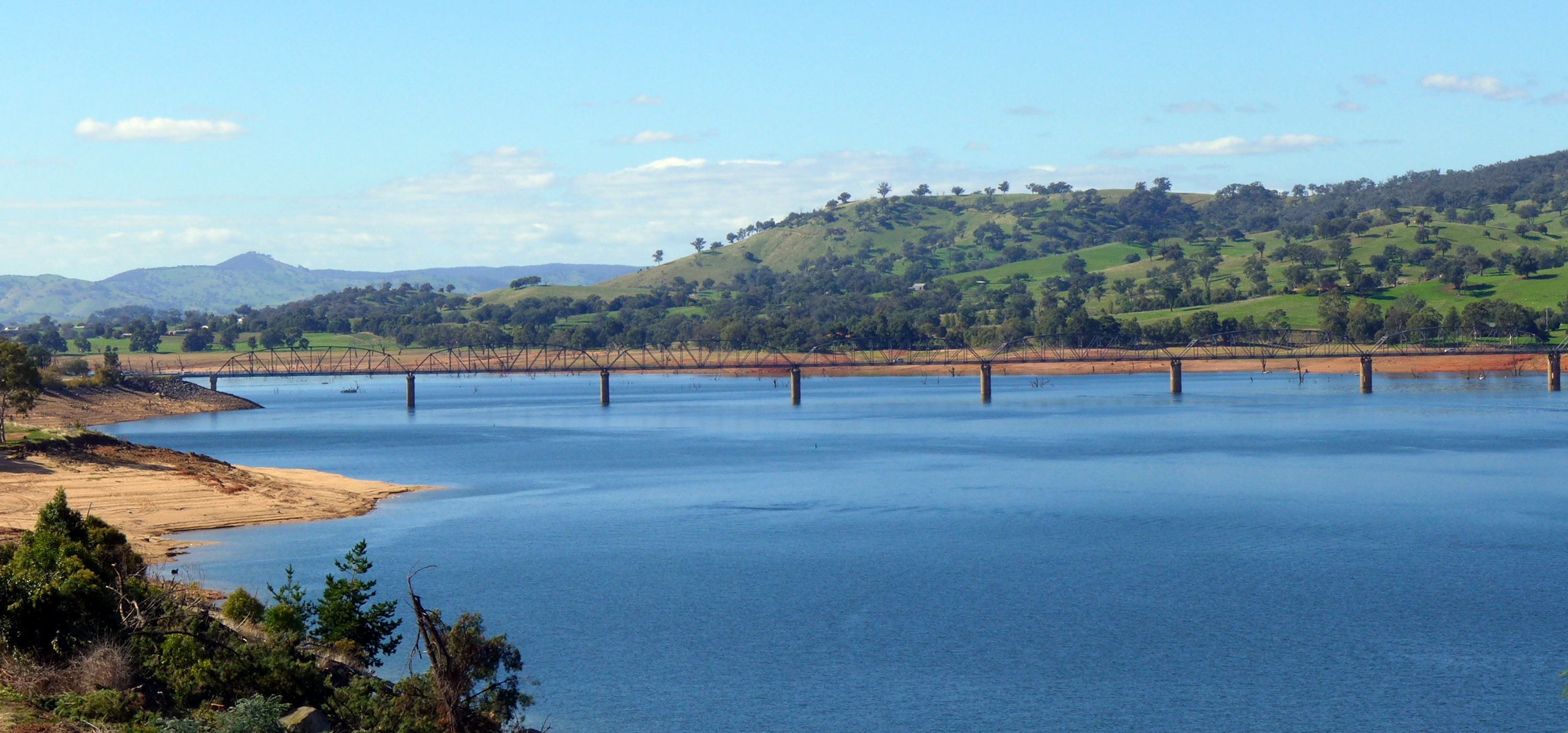
Bethanga Bridge in 2014.

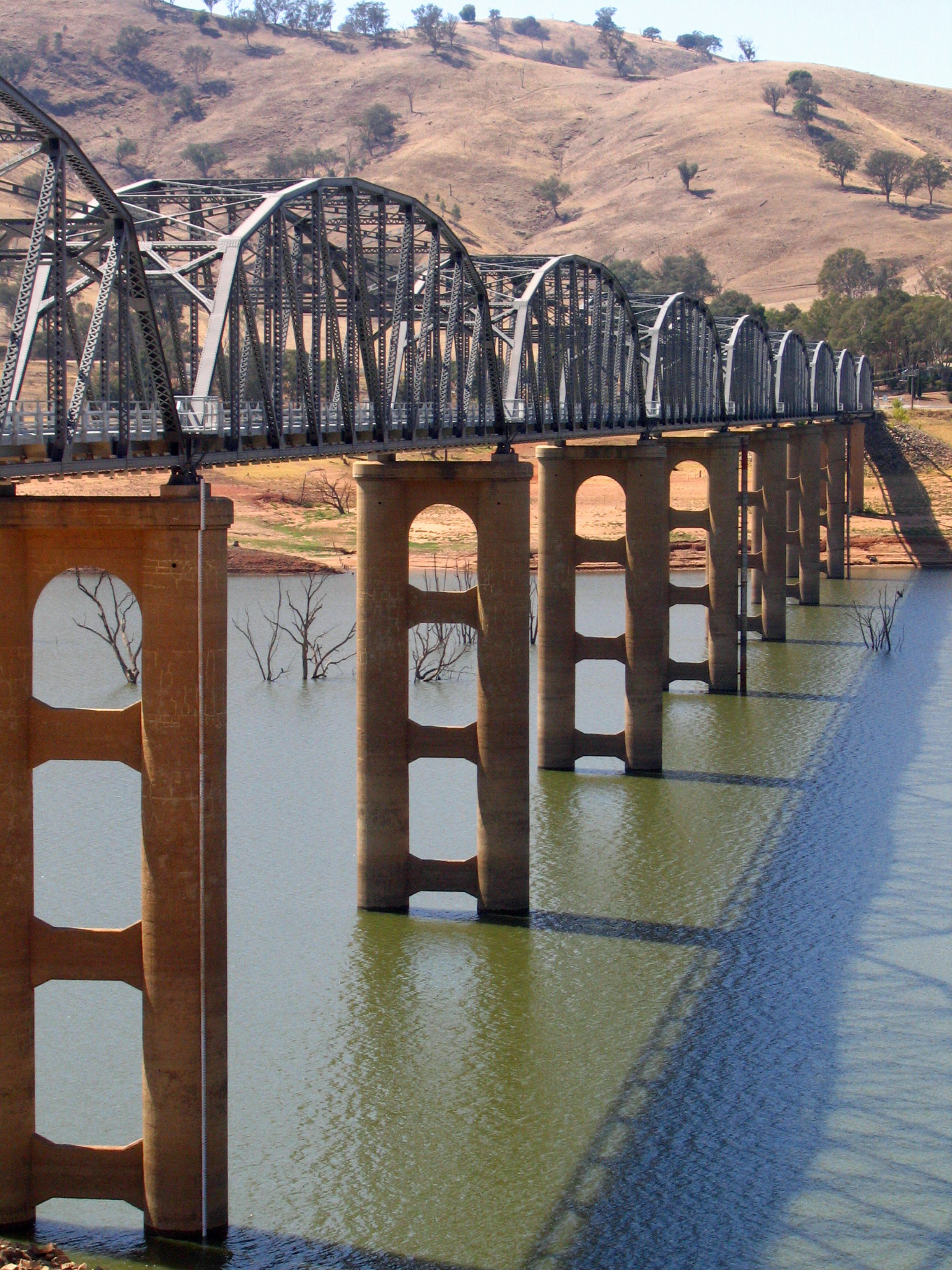
Bethanga Bridge in 2007, during drought.

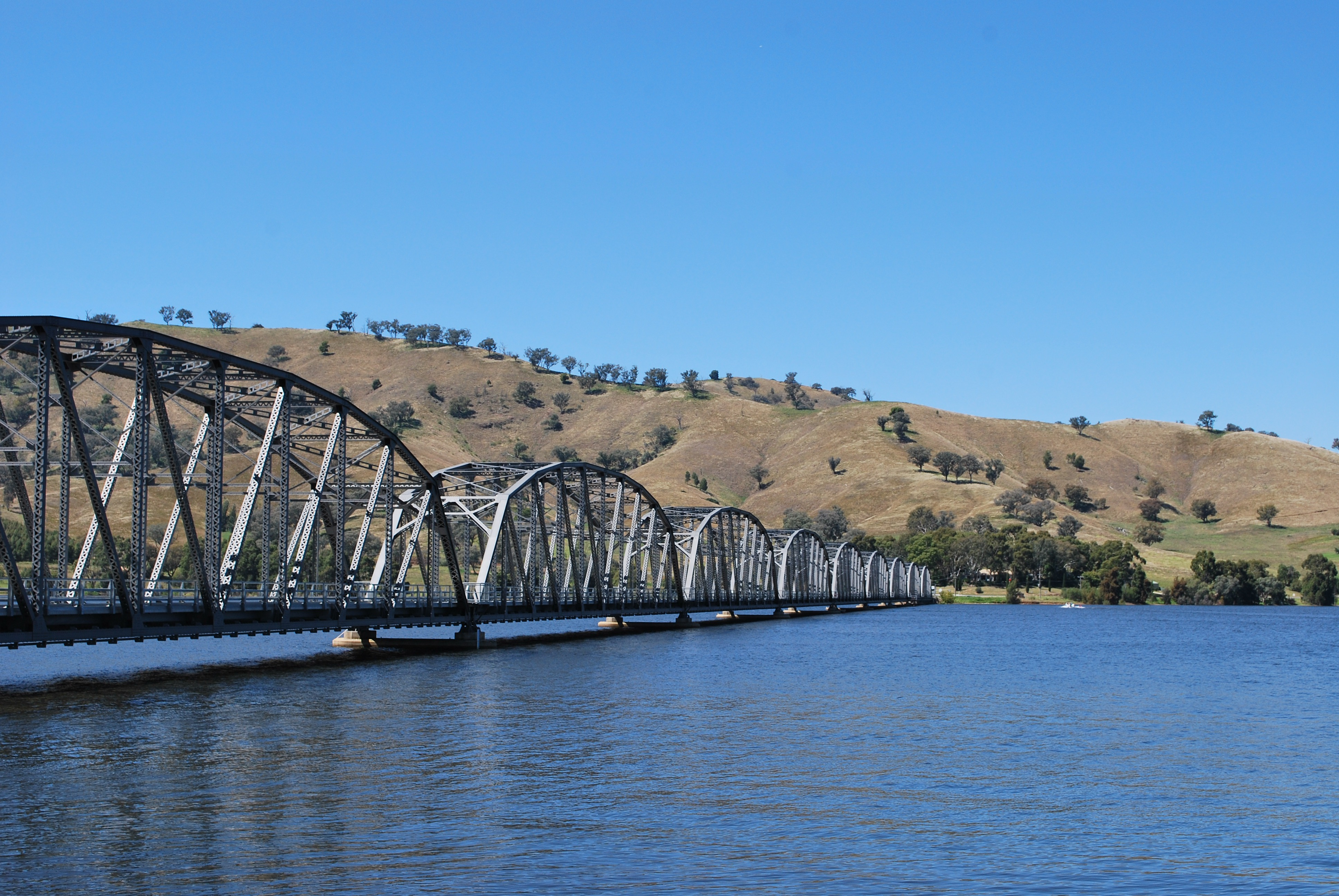
Bethanga Bridge in 2010.

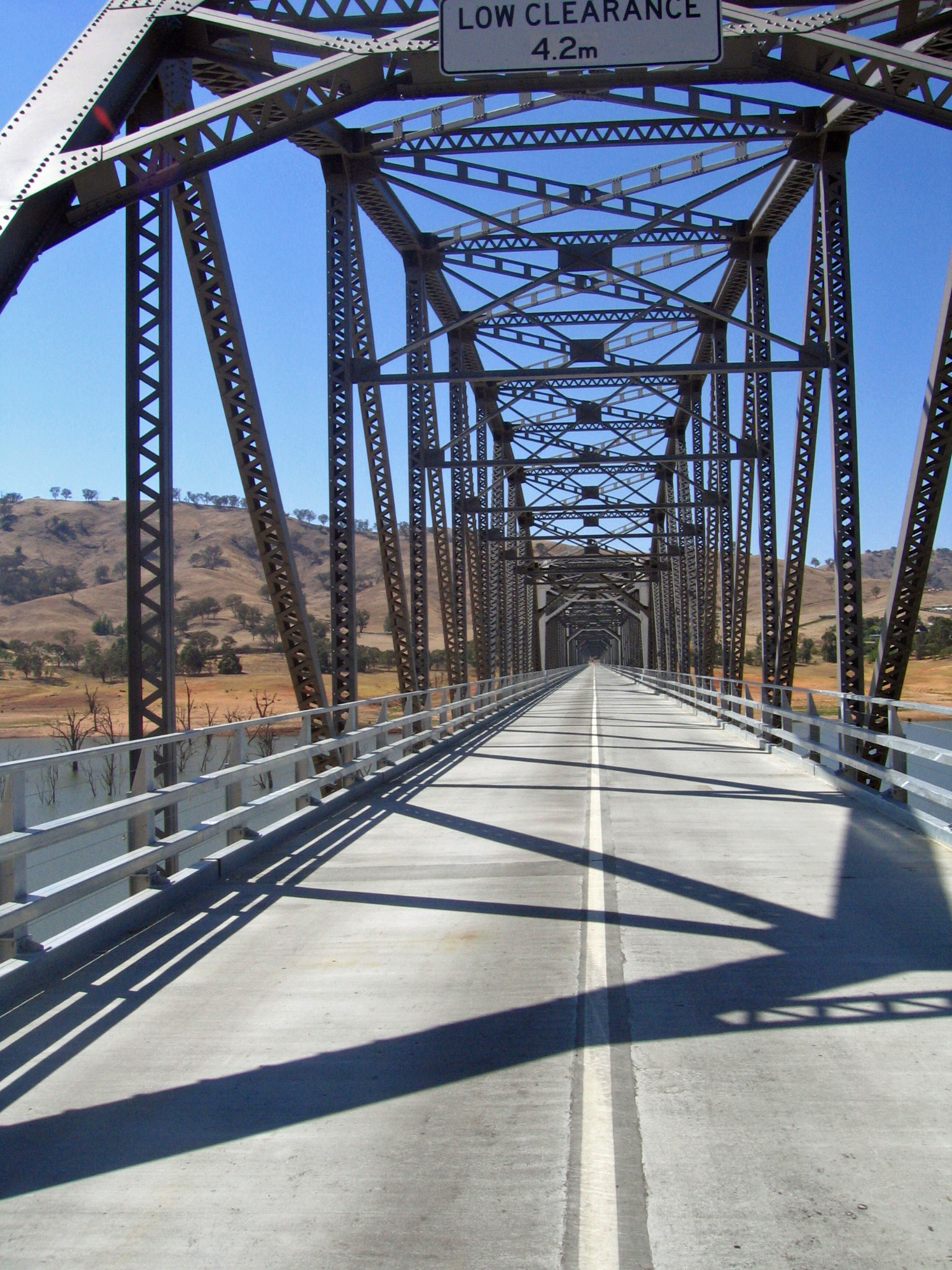

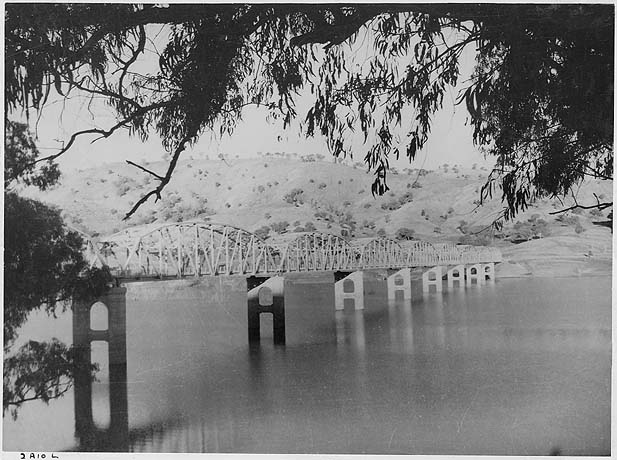
Unknown date, from the NSW State Records.

== See also ==
- Allan truss bridge
- List of bridges in Australia

Next bridge upstream	Murray River	Next bridge downstream
Wymah Ferry	Bethanga Bridge	Bonegilla Bridge
