= Stony Crossing railway line =

Railway line in Victoria and New South Wales, Australia

Overview
- Status: Closed
- Locale: Victoria and New South Wales, Australia

Technical
- Track gauge: 1,600 mm (5 ft 3 in)

The railway to Stony Crossing, New South Wales, was sanctioned as part of the Border Railways Act 1922. It was often referred to as the Gonn Crossing to Stony Crossing railway, although it originated at Kerang, Victoria and served Murrabit, before running into New South Wales at Gonn Crossing on the Murray River.

The first section to Murrabit was opened in December 1924. The combined rail/road bridge at Gonn Crossing was opened on 1 July 1926, and the complete railway to Stony Crossing was opened on 16 March 1928.

Initially, there were three trains per week to Murrabit, with one continuing to Stony Crossing. Services were suspended between Murrabit and Stony Crossing in 1943.

During periods of light traffic the line was served by a timber-bodied rail tractor, probably recycling the underframe from an old goods wagon and fitted with a Fordson tractor engine. This service typically operated with a small number of goods wagons, with a YZ composite second class and brake van at the rear.

On 20 April 1961, a steam locomotive had an accident on a small bridge between Kerang and Murrabit, and as a result services to between Kerang and Murrabit were suspended. The railway was closed on 20 December 1961.

== See also ==
- Rail transport in Victoria
- Rail transport in New South Wales
