= Bellbridge =

- Town
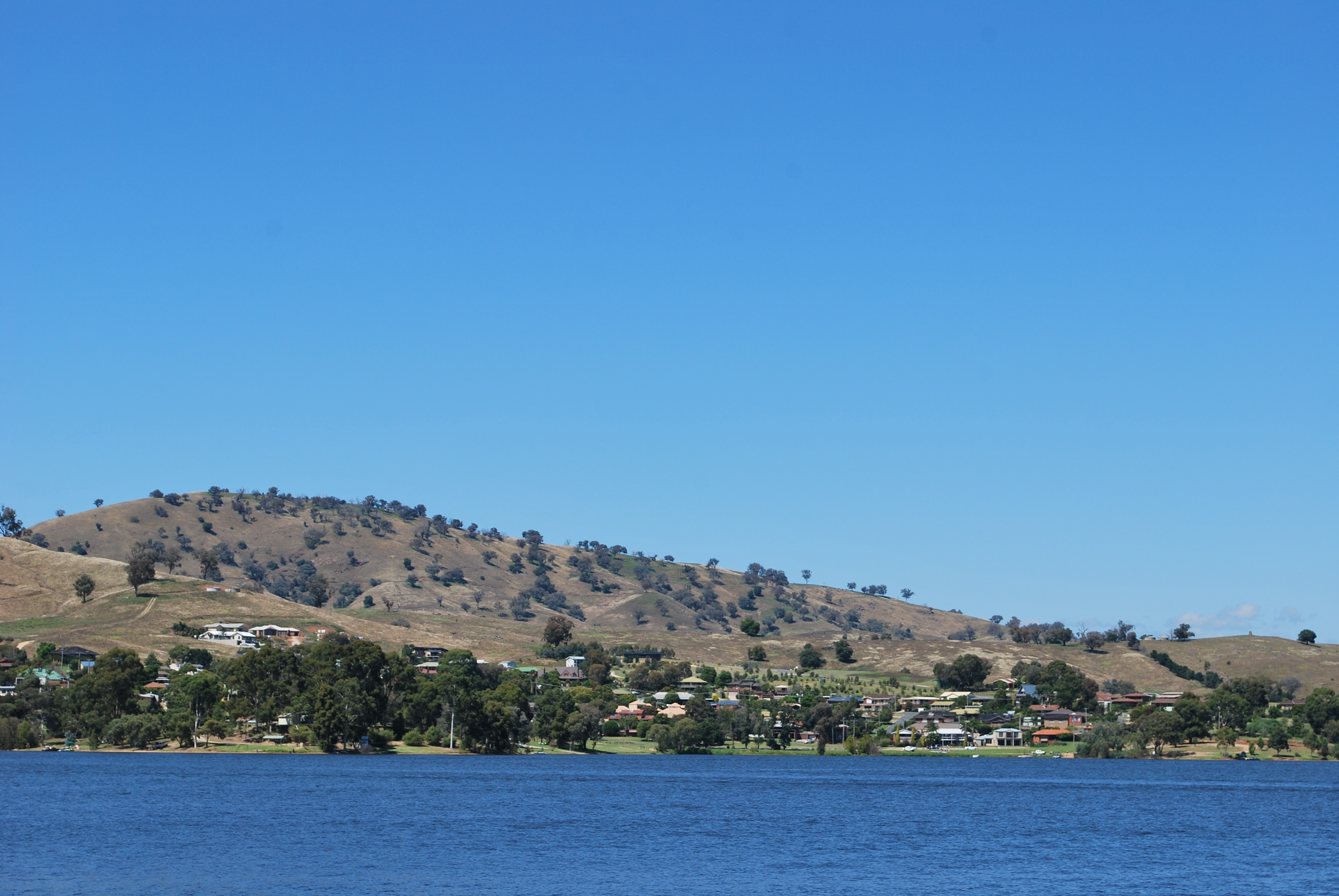
- Bellbridge seen over a nearly full Lake Hume in March 2010

- Interactive map of Bellbridge
- Coordinates: 36°05′53″S 147°03′32″E
- Country: Australia
- State: Victoria
- Region: Hume
- LGA: Shire of Towong
- Location: 398 km (247 mi) NE of Melbourne; 18 km (11 mi) E of Albury (NSW); 39 km (24 mi) NW of Tallangatta

Government
  - State electorate: Benambra
  - Federal division: Indi

Population
  - Total: 393 (2021 census)
- Postcode: 3691

Bellbridge is a town in north-eastern Victoria, Australia in the Shire of Towong local government area overlooking the Lake Hume and located near the Bethanga Bridge, Bellbridge is a popular destination for local tourists, especially from the nearby towns of Albury and Wodonga who often come to the Weir to water ski. The local Hume Boat Club holds an annual get-together for water skiers from across Victoria.

The township itself developed from farming land in the 1960s.

At the 2021 census, Bellbridge had a population of 393.
