= Jingellic =

- Town
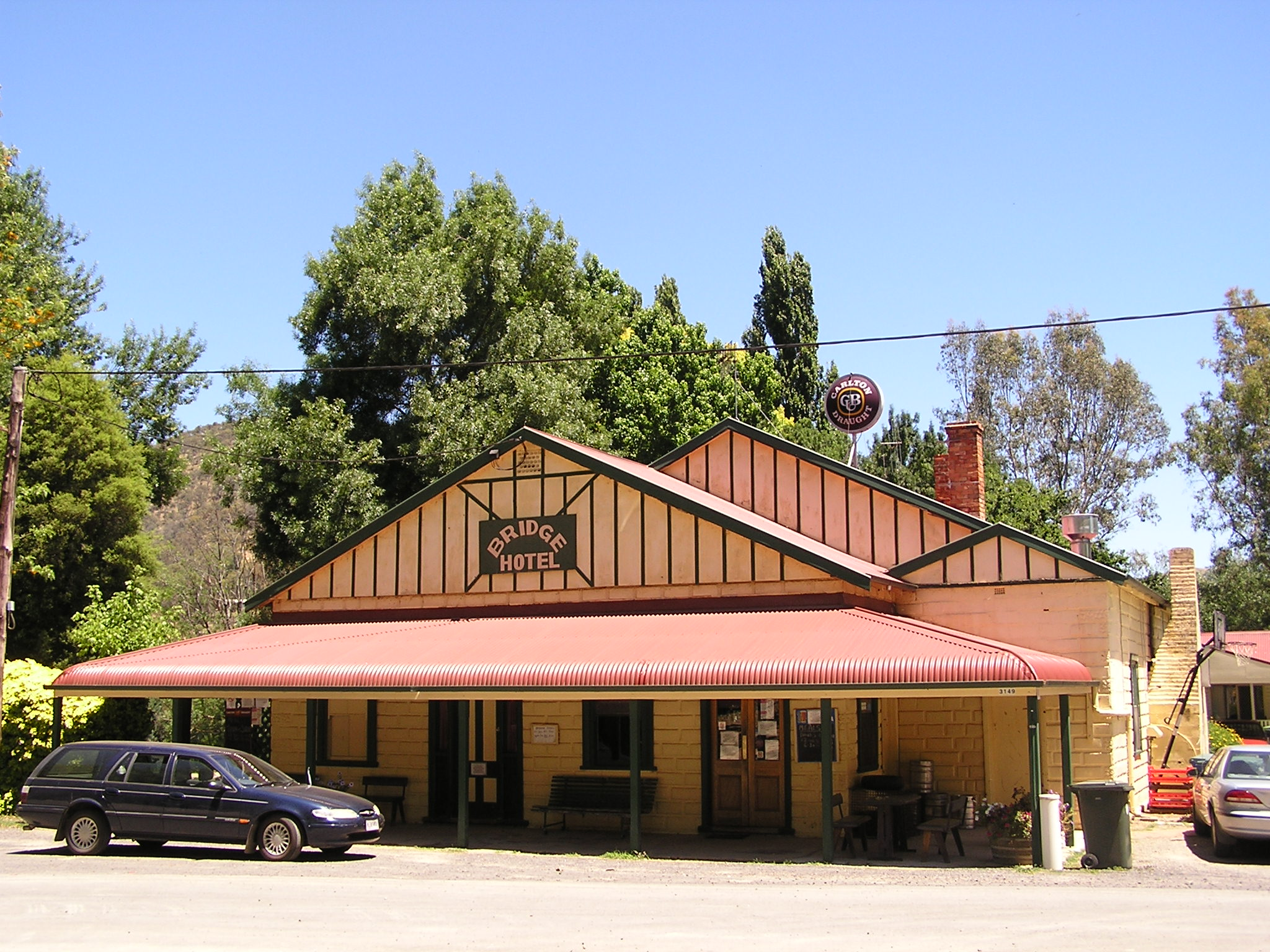
- The Bridge Hotel

- Coordinates: 35°54′0″S 147°41′0″E
- Country: Australia
- State: New South Wales
- LGAs: Snowy Valleys Council; Greater Hume Shire
- Location: 520 km (320 mi) SW of Sydney; 45 km (28 mi) SW of Tumbarumba; 112 km (70 mi) WSW of Albury

Government
  - State electorate: Albury
  - Federal divisions: Riverina; Farrer
- Elevation: 225 m (738 ft)

Population
  - Total: 73 (2021 census)
- Postcode: 2642
- County: Selwyn

Jingellic /dʒɪnˈdʒɛlɪk/ is a small town that straddles the boundaries of the Greater Hume Shire and Snowy Valleys Council local government areas in the South West Slopes region of New South Wales, Australia. The town is located near a crossing on the upper Murray River.

Across the river on the Victorian side are the nearby towns of Walwa and Tintaldra. The Bridge Hotel at Jingellic is well known in the district. Below the hotel is a camping ground on the banks of the river.

== History ==
European settlers grazed cattle on the banks of Murray at Jingellic from the 1830s. The first land grants were issued in the 1840s and 1850s. Jingellic Post Office opened on 15 September 1883. In 1920 a butter factory was established. With the decline of the dairy industry it closed in 1963.

Each year in early March Jingellic hosts its annual agricultural show. The show centres around equestrian competition. It also features some cattle (and formerly sheep) judging, a pavilion, and entertainment in the form of amusement rides. The show began in 1927.

The bridge was begun in 1887 but not opened until 1892. Once the bridge was opened, a customs house was built on the Victorian side and operated until 1915 from which time customs dues were no longer an issue. Apparently locals continued to use the nearby Horse Creek ford for smuggling. When the new bridge was constructed in 1959, it bypassed the town.

The remains of the old bridge are seen as significant by the Transport for NSW as "a representative example of a method of bridge building which is no longer used. It is one of several identifiable stages of bridge building along the Murray." The remnants of the old bridge are upstream of the present bridge and the hotel. The remnants consist of steel or iron trestles standing in the river without any superstructure. The present bridge is a steel truss bridge with ten approach spans; seven on the NSW side and three on the Victorian side.

== Gallery ==
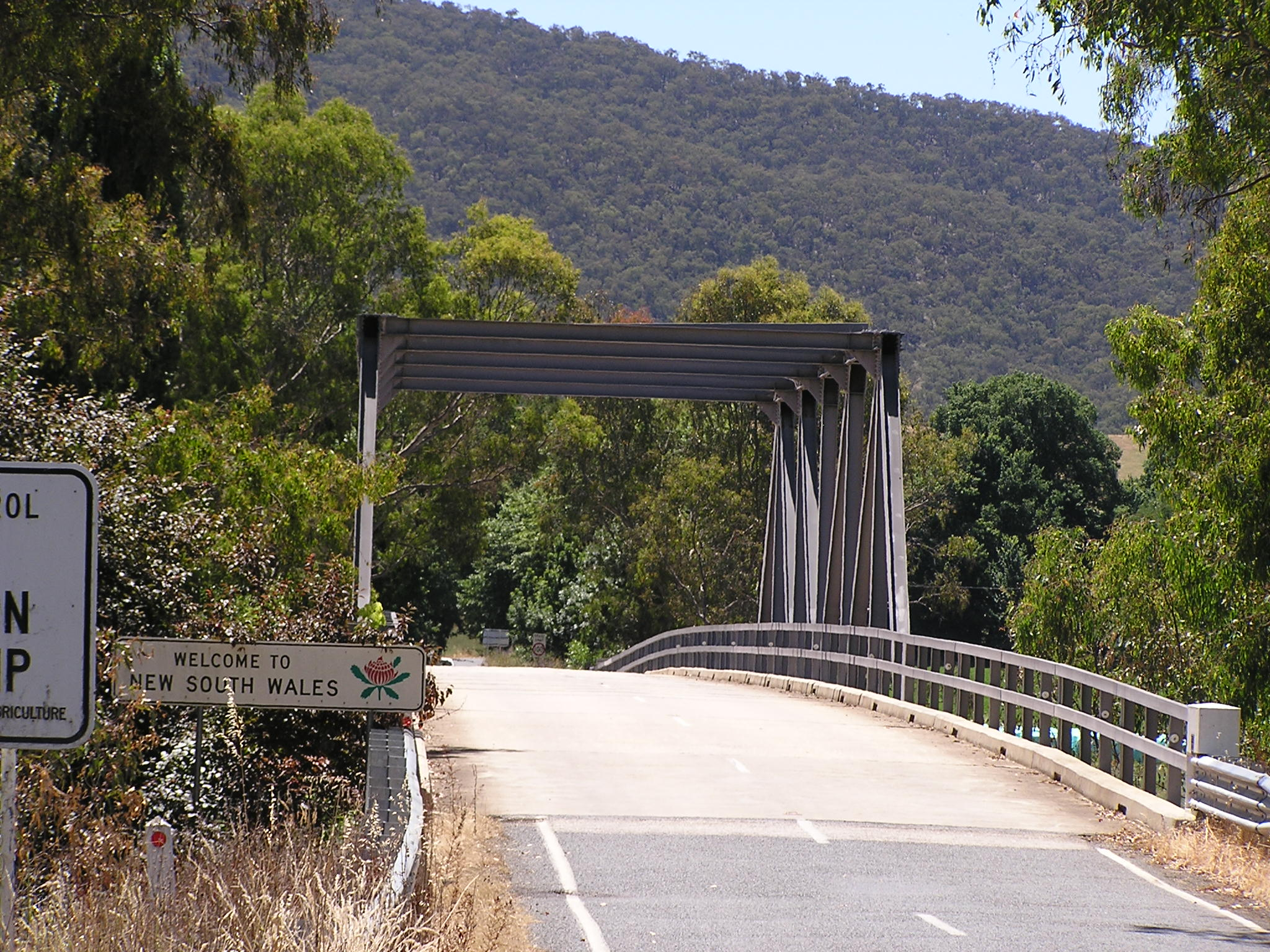
The bridge at Jingellic

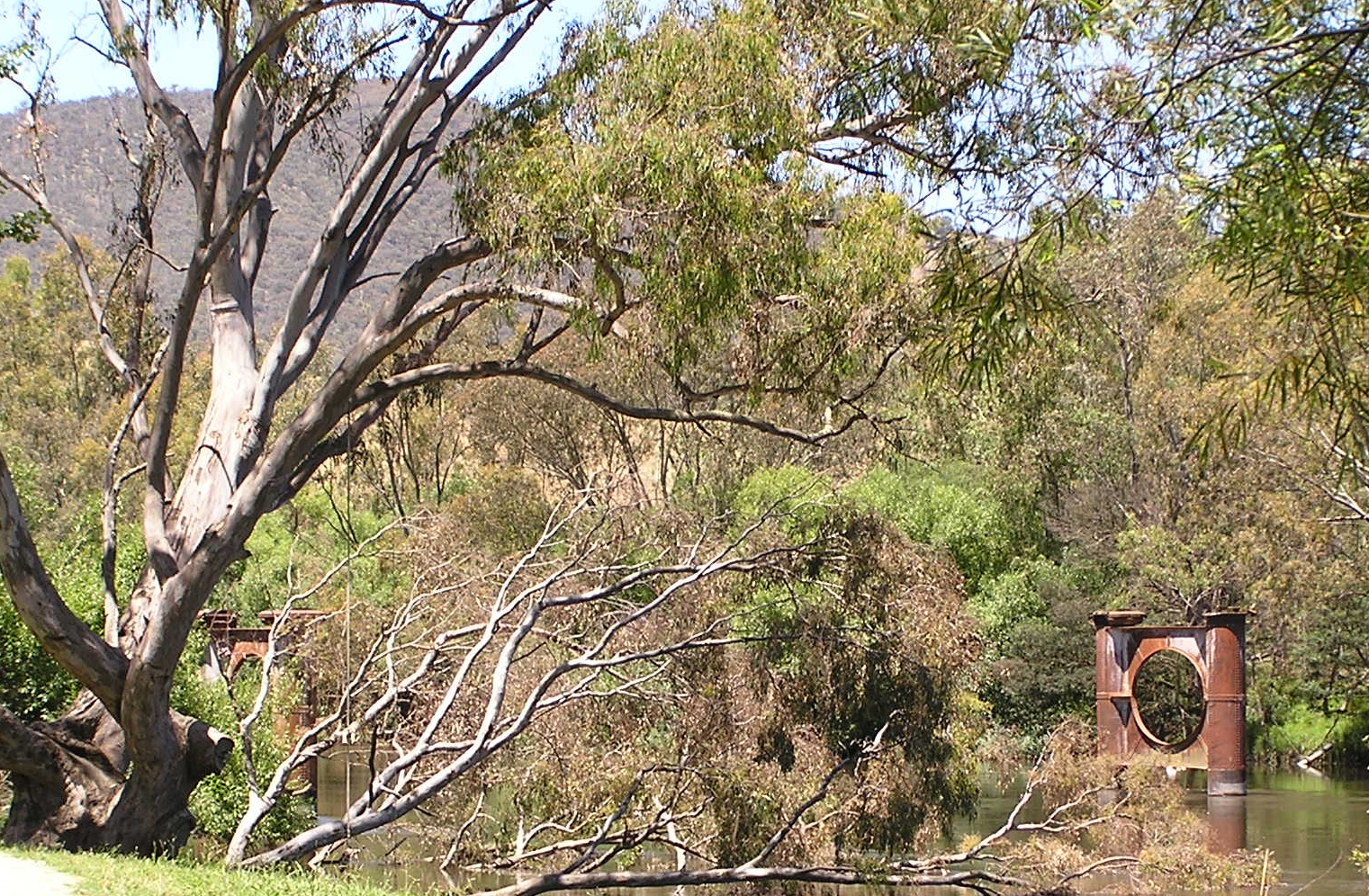
Remains of the old bridge at Jingellic

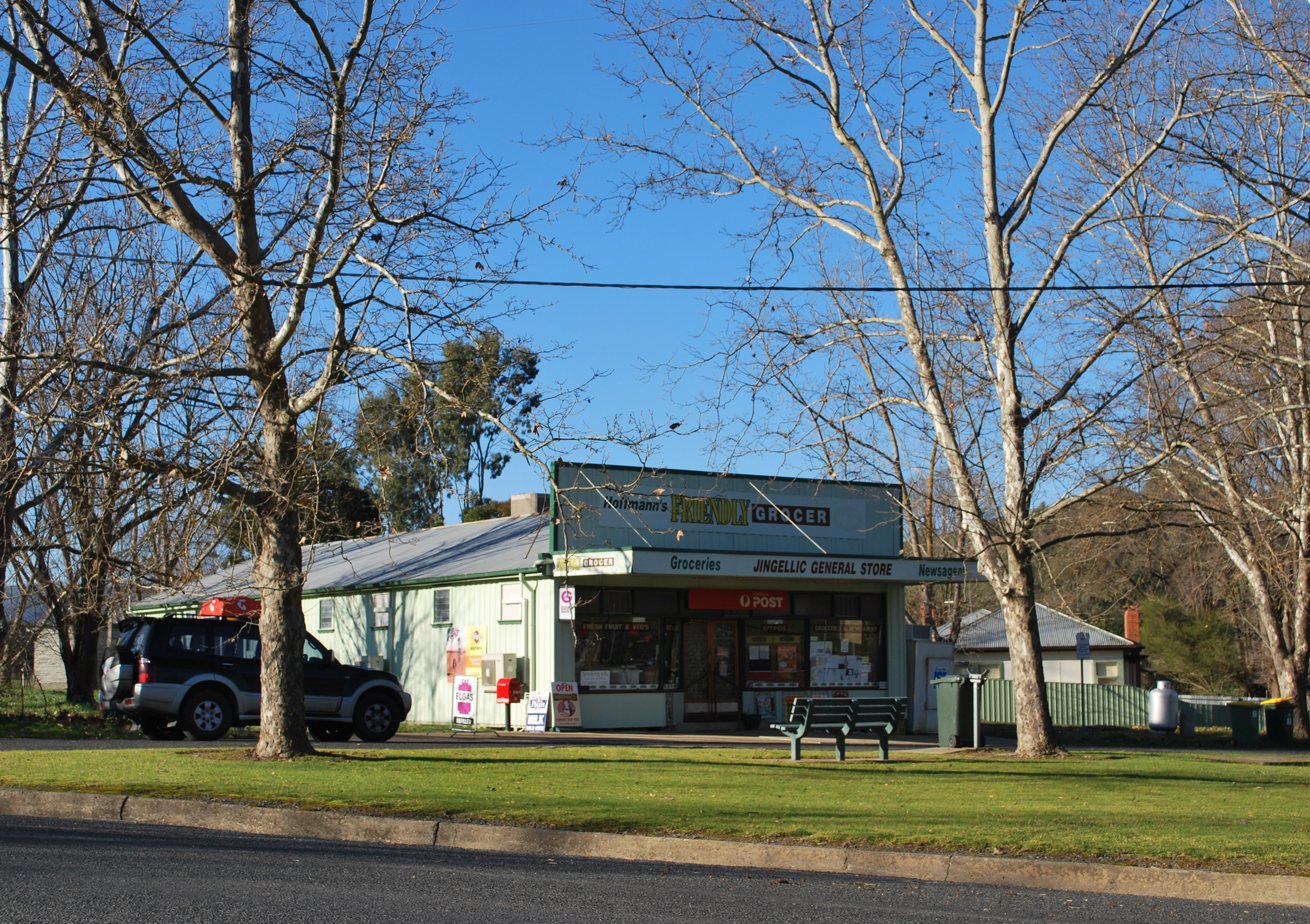
General store
