= Hume Dam =

Dam in New South Wales, Australia

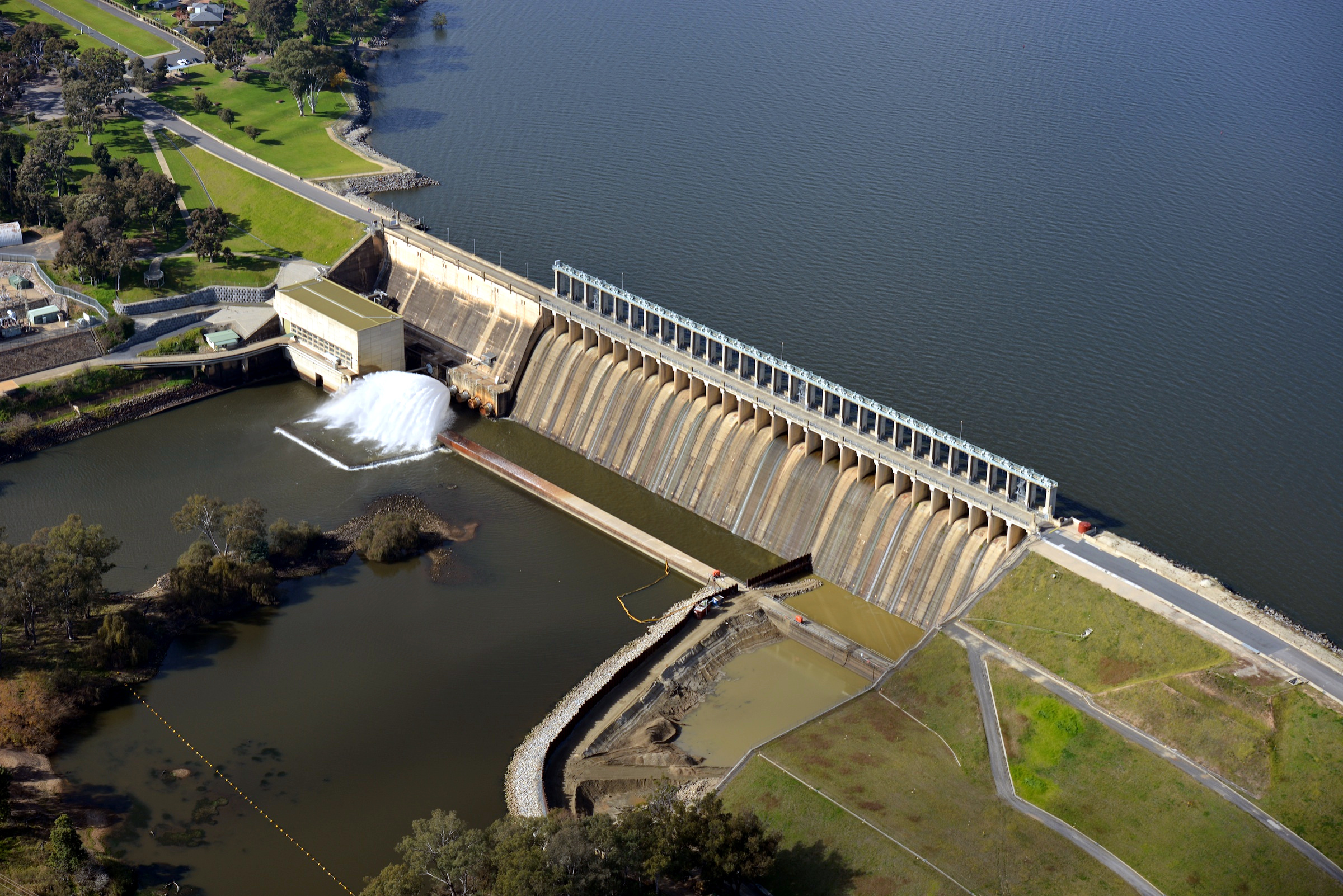
- The Hume Dam and spillway, 2012

- Location of the dam on the New South Wales/Victorian border
- Interactive map of Hume Dam
- Country: Australia
- Location: Riverina, New South Wales
- Coordinates: 36°06′30″S 147°01′52″E
- Purpose: Flood mitigation; hydroelectricity; irrigation; water supply; conservation
- Status: Operational
- Construction began: 1919
- Opening date: 1936
- Construction cost: A$30.5 million (Dam); A£2.1 million (Power station)
- Owner: Murray-Darling Basin Authority
- Operators: Goulburn-Murray Water (Vic.); State Water Corporation (NSW)

Dam and spillways
- Type of dam: Gravity dam
- Impounds: Murray River
- Height: 51 m (167 ft)
- Length: 1,615 metres (5,299 ft)
- Spillways: 29
- Spillway type: Vertical undershot gated concrete overflow
- Spillway capacity: 7,929 m^{3}/s (280,000 cu ft/s)

Reservoir
- Creates: Lake Hume
- Total capacity: 3,036,500 ML (2,461,700 acre⋅ft)
- Active capacity: 1,417,188 ML (1,148,933 acre⋅ft)
- Inactive capacity: 1,619,312 ML (1,312,798 acre⋅ft)
- Catchment area: 15,300 km^{2} (5,900 sq mi)
- Surface area: 20,190 ha (49,900 acres)
- Maximum water depth: 40 m (130 ft)
- Normal elevation: 192 m (630 ft) AHD

Hume Power Station
- Operator: Meridian Energy
- Commission date: 1957
- Type: Conventional
- Turbines: 2 x 29 MW (39,000 hp) (Kaplan-type)
- Installed capacity: 58 MW (78,000 hp)
- Annual generation: 220 GWh (790 TJ)
- Website statewater.com.au

The Hume Dam, formerly the Hume Weir, is a major dam across the Murray River downstream of its junction with the Mitta River in the Riverina region of New South Wales, Australia. The dam's purpose includes flood mitigation, hydro-power, irrigation and water supply. The impounded reservoir is called Lake Hume, formerly the Hume Reservoir. The concrete gravity dam with four embankments has twenty-nine vertical undershot gated concrete overflow spillways.

The dam is part of the Engineering Works of the River Murray that are listed as a National Engineering Landmark by Engineers Australia, as part of its Engineering Heritage Recognition Program.

== Location ==
Constructed over a 17-year period between 1919 and 1936, the Hume Dam is approximately 11 kilometres (6.8 mi) east of the city of Albury. The dam was built, involving a workforce of thousands, by a consortium of NSW and Victorian government agencies that included the Water Resources Commission of New South Wales, the Public Works Department of New South Wales, and the State Rivers and Water Supply Commission of Victoria.

Supplies to the construction site were delivered via rail, through the construction of a branch siding from the Wodonga – Cudgewa railway. Hume Dam is jointly managed by Victorian and New South Wales authorities on behalf of the Murray-Darling Basin Authority. Goulburn-Murray Water manages water and land located in Victoria, and the New South Wales State Water Corporation is responsible for day-to-day operation and maintenance and the management of major remedial works at the dam.

== Description ==
The dam is a mix of a concrete gravity dam with four earth-filled embankments. The dam wall height is 51 metres (167 ft). The crest is 1,615 metres (5,299 ft) long, with the auxiliary embankments extending a further 1,010 metres (3,310 ft). The maximum water elevation above sea level is 194 metres (636 ft). When full, the dam wall holds back 3,005,157 megalitres (106,126.1×10^{6} cu ft) of water at 194 metres (636 ft) AHD. The surface area of Lake Hume is 20,190 hectares (49,900 acres). The catchment area is 15,300 square kilometres (5,900 sq mi). The dam wall is constructed of rock covered with clay and other earth and is designed to carry vehicular traffic. A controlled concrete spillway has a gated concrete overflow, with twenty-nine vertical undershot gates, is capable of discharging 7,929 cubic metres per second (280,000 cu ft/s).

Water is retained nearly 40 kilometres (25 mi) upstream of the reservoir in the valleys of both the Murray and Mitta Mitta rivers.

The dam wall was extended during the 1950s, and completed in 1961, necessitating the wholesale removal of Tallangatta township and its re-establishment at a new site 8 kilometres (5.0 mi) west of the original, as well as the raising of the Bethanga Bridge.

Monitoring of the dam in the early 1990s revealed that the water pressure and leakage had caused the dam to move on its foundations slightly, leading to concerns that the dam was heading for collapse, threatening Albury-Wodonga and the entire Murray basin. Authorities denied any short-term threat. Traffic was banned from the spillway, and remedial work began involving, in part, the construction of a secondary earth wall behind the original to take the strain. Further upgrades to the dam at an estimated cost of A$60 million began in 2007 and were completed in 2013. These works include the installation of an improved filter and drainage system on the junction between the concrete spillway and southern embankment, construction of a concrete buttress on the southern training wall, and possible modifications to improve the ability of the dam to manage extreme floods.

== Hydroelectric power station ==
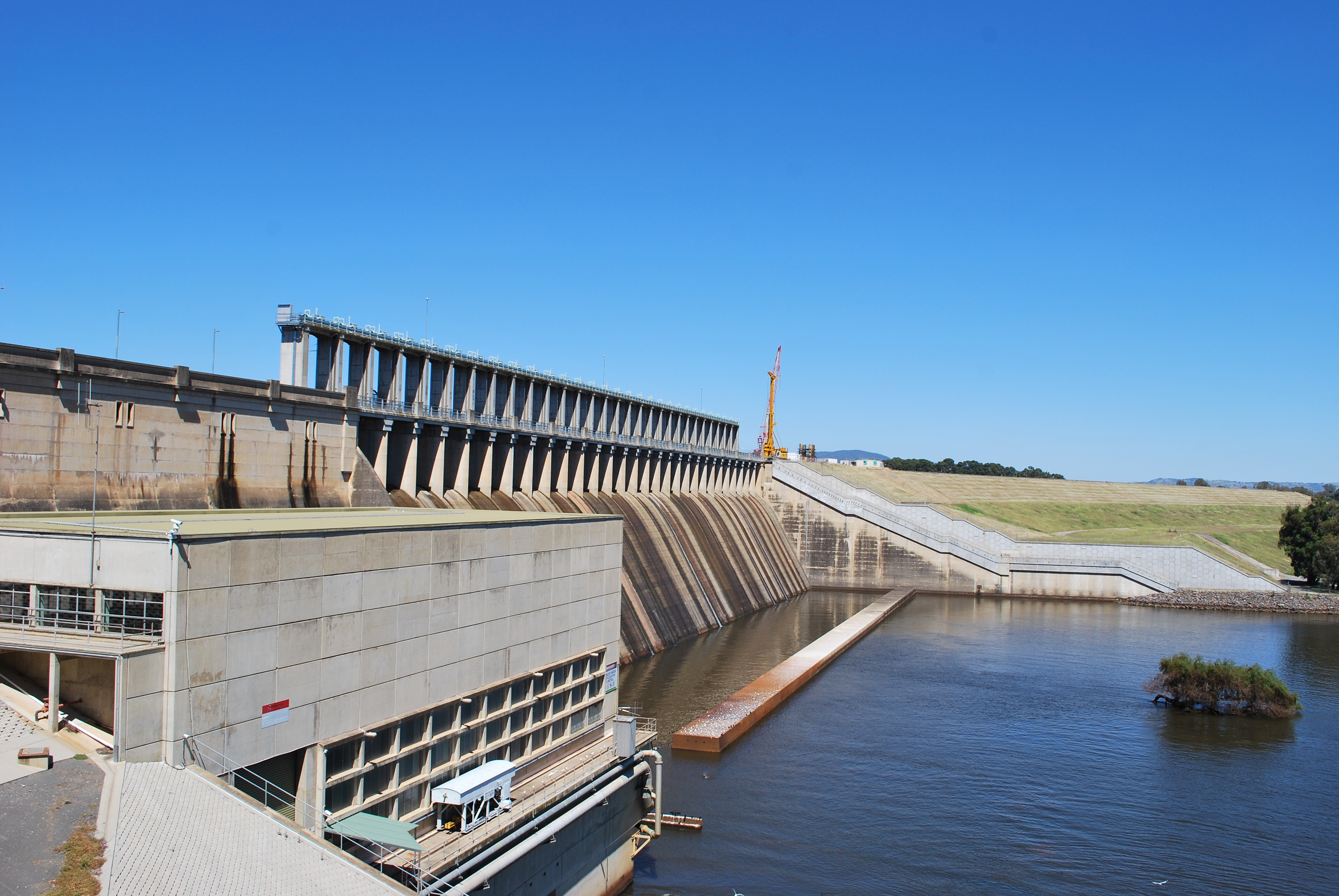
Hume Power Station, 2011

The Hume Power Station is a 58-megawatt (78,000 hp) conventional hydroelectric power station installed in the dam wall, and is primarily used for peak-load generation. Operated by a subsidiary of the New Zealand-based Meridian Energy since 2017, the station has an average annual output of 220 gigawatt-hours (790 TJ). The power station was completed in 1957 at a cost of A£2.1 million. Initially running two 25-megawatt (34,000 hp) turbines, they were each upgraded to 29 megawatts (39,000 hp) Kaplan-type turbines in 2000. Power is transmitted to both NSW and Victorian energy markets via two separate transmission lines – a 132-kV line to Albury and a 66-kV line to Wodonga.

In October 2012, a high voltage transformer at the power station caught fire, requiring more than fifty fire fighters who worked into the long hours of the night to put the blaze out.

== Etymology ==
Originally named the Mitta Mitta Dam site, following representations from the Municipal Council of Albury, on 17 February 1920 the River Murray Commission decided to honour Hamilton Hume, who, in company with William Hovell, was one of the first Europeans to see and cross the Murray River in 1824. In 1920, the reservoir was named the Hume Reservoir and the dam adopted the name of the Hume Weir, the name given by the Victorian Place Names Committee. Following a proposal from Hume Shire Council, in 1996 both the NSW and Victorian governments agreed that the dam should be named the Hume Dam, and the reservoir be named Lake Hume.

== Lake Hume ==
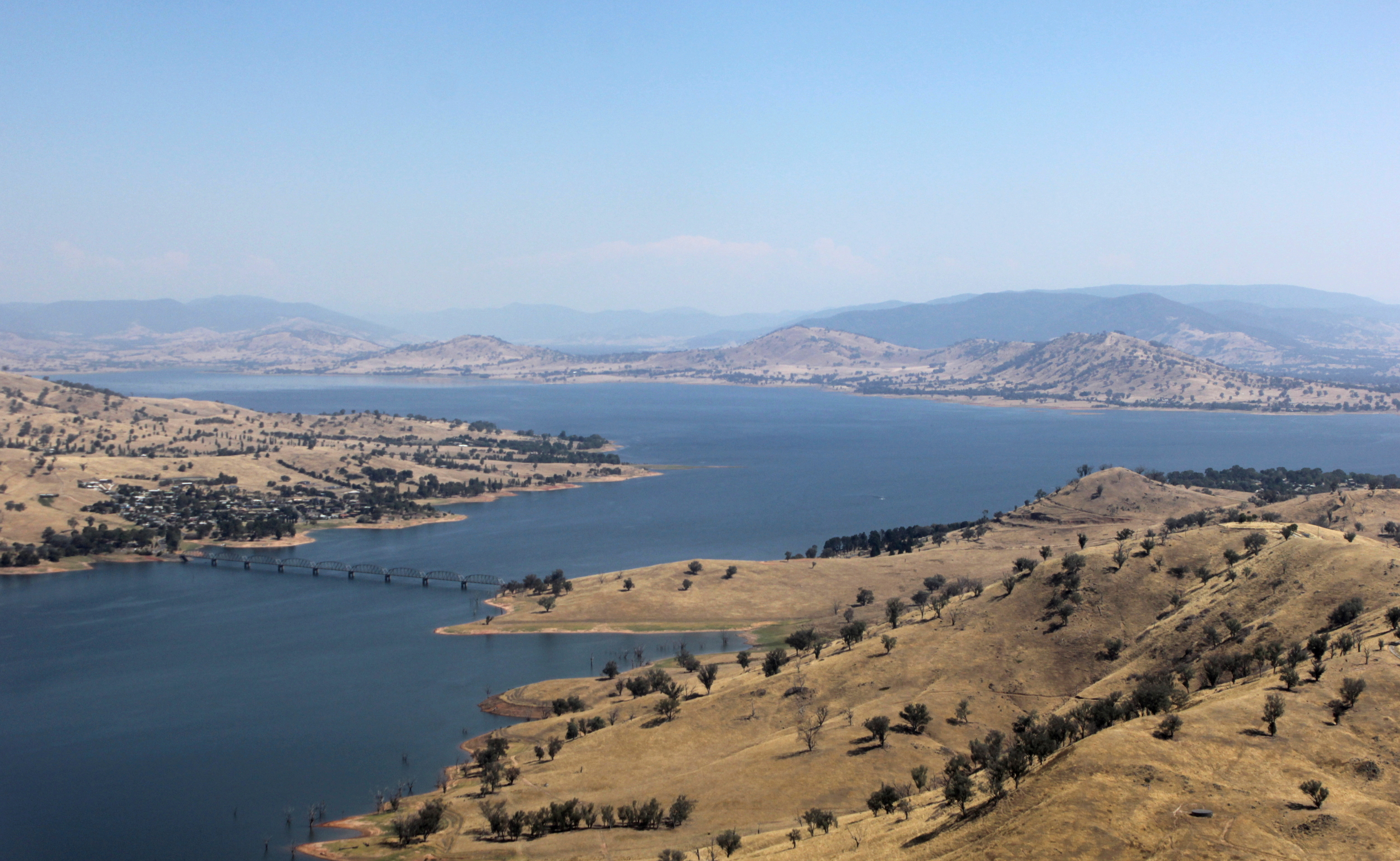
Lake Hume, 2014

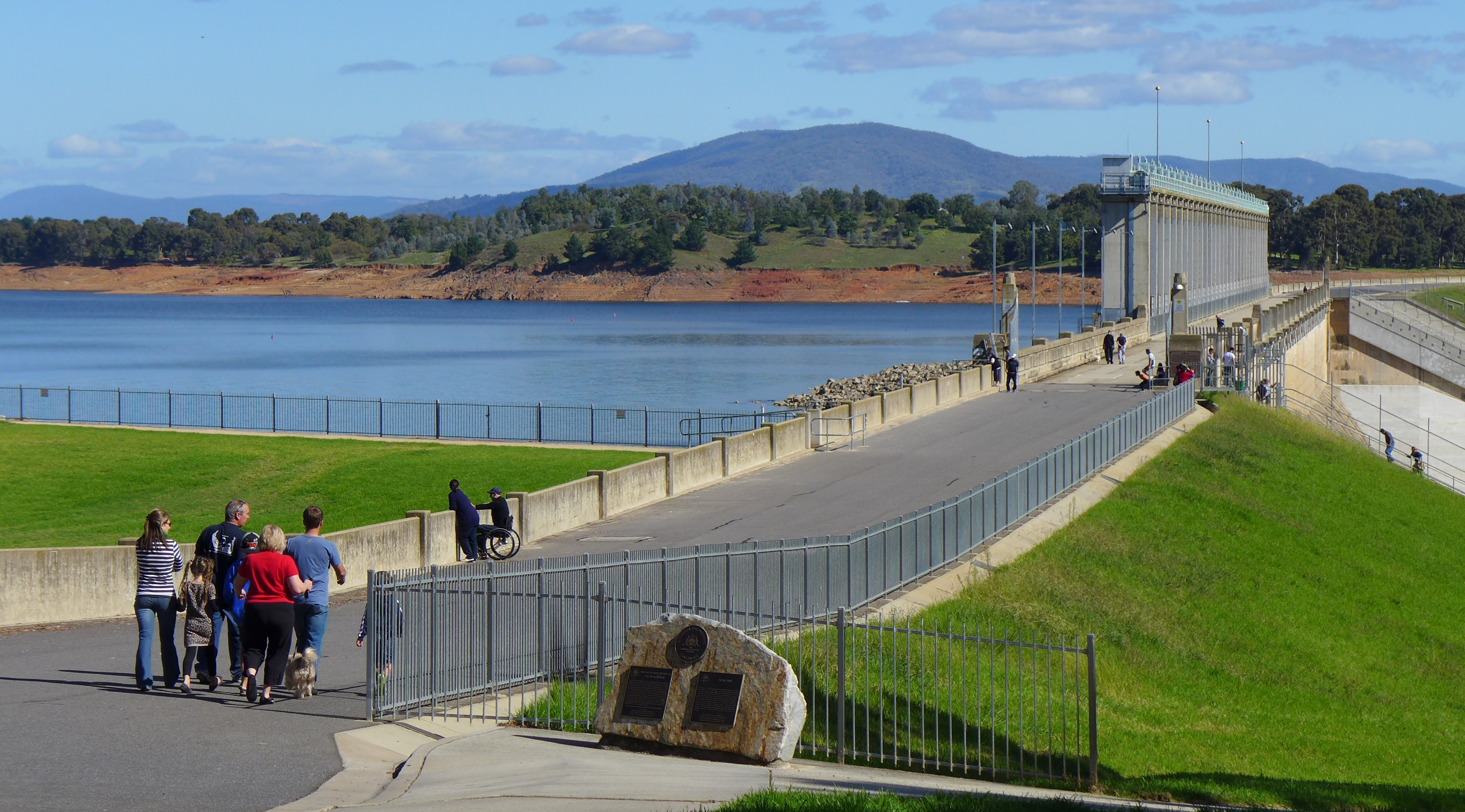
The dam wall's easy accessibility makes it a popular place to visit.

Lake Hume is estimated to hold approximately six times the volume of water in Sydney Harbour. The small towns of Tallangatta, Bonegilla and Bellbridge are located on the shores of Lake Hume. The reservoir is often referred to as the Hume Weir, and was named Lake Hume in the mid-1980s.

=== Reservoir levels ===
Lake Hume was the furthest upstream of the major reservoirs on the Murray River system, before the Dartmouth Dam was built further up the Mitta Mitta River to provide improved buffering during prolonged dry spells. The Hume Dam has the capacity to release water at the fastest rate. Irrigation authorities use the reservoir as the storage of first resort. Typically, the reservoir had fallen to less than one-third of its capacity by March each year. In normal years, it refills to at least two-thirds of its capacity before November.

Australia's highly unpredictable climatic conditions cause those norms to vary quite significantly from year to year. In 2007, during the Millennium Drought, Lake Hume fell to 1% capacity, barely more than the water in the Murray and Mitta Mitta rivers flowing through on their original paths. Between 2010 and April 2013, the lowest storage level was in the range of 500,000 megalitres (18,000×10^{6} cu ft).

=== Recreation ===
The lake is stocked with fish. Most of these are introduced species – carp, redfin and trout though native species such as golden perch and Murray cod can also be found. The fishing varies from year to year. It is also popular for water skiing, and several holiday resorts catering for fishing and skiers are dotted around the upper reaches of the lake. An annual canoe marathon race, the "Frank Harrison Classic", is run on the river beginning below the dam each February and attracts competitors from across Australia.

==== Sailing on Hume Dam ====
In 1958, a group of enthusiastic sailors established a sailing club and started to run regular regattas.

The sailing club has since grown and is now known as the Albury Wodonga Yacht Club (AWYC). The club offers sail training for children and adults, and regular weekend racing. Once a year, on the first weekend in November, AWYC runs SailCountry, a large regatta which attracts entrants from all over Australia.

== Impact on the ecology of the Murray River ==
The construction of Hume Dam has caused significant changes to the flow patterns and ecology of the Murray River. Before the construction of the Hume Weir, flows in normal, non-drought years were low in summer and autumn, though still significant overall, rising in winter due to seasonal rainfall and reaching a flood-peak in late spring due to snow-melt in the Murray and its tributaries' alpine headwaters. The flow is now effectively reversed, with low flows in winter and sustained, relatively high flows in late spring, summer and early autumn to meet irrigation demands. The spring flood peak has been virtually eliminated.

The water released from the base of the Hume Weir is unnaturally cold, at least 10 °C (18 °F) colder than it naturally should be. This flow reversal, temperature depression, and removal of the spring flood peak, has led to the drying out and loss of many billabongs and has harmed the populations of native fish of the Murray River such as the iconic Murray cod and the freshwater catfish, which can no longer be found downstream of the dam as far as Yarrawonga, where it had previously been recorded up until the 1960s.

== Hume Weir Football Club ==
The Hume Weir Football Club (FC) was established in 1921, mainly from footballers working on the construction of the new weir. The club initially played in the Albury & Border Football Association from 1921 to 1923, wearing black and white striped jumpers. Andrew Mafferzoni was the club's initial coach in 1921 and they played at the "Weir Ground". Hume Weir won the Albury & Border FA premiership in 1922 and 1923.

In 1924, Hume Weir joined the Ovens and Murray Football League (O&MFL) and played there until 1929. Percy Jones kicked 104 goals for Hume Weir in 1928 before being lured to Geelong in 1929. As part of being admitted into the O&MFL in 1924, Hume Weir agreed to play their home games at the Wodonga Racecourse Oval. Hume Weir were runners up to Wangaratta in 1925 and were coached by Tim Archer. In 1927, Hume Weir played their home games at Wodonga Park.

In 1930, Hume Weir merged with Ebden Rovers FC to become the Weir United FC. Weir United won the 1930 and 1931 O&MFL premierships. In 1933, East Albury FC and Weir United FC merged to become the Albury-based Border United FC. Wearing green and white jumpers, they played in and lost the 1933 O&MFL grand final to Wangaratta; and, in the 1935 grand final, they lost to Rutherglen. In 1936, Border United FC and Albury FC merged into one club, called Albury FC. Albury FC played in the 1937, 1939 and 1940 O&MFL grand finals. Immediately after the World War II recess, Albury FC played in the 1946, 1947 and 1948 O&MFL grand finals.

== Gallery ==
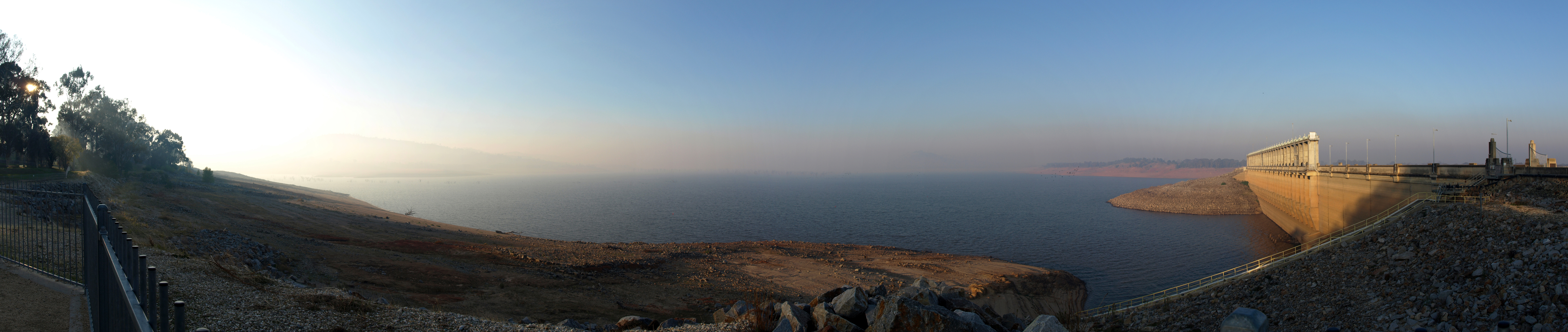
Hume Dam panorama, 2009

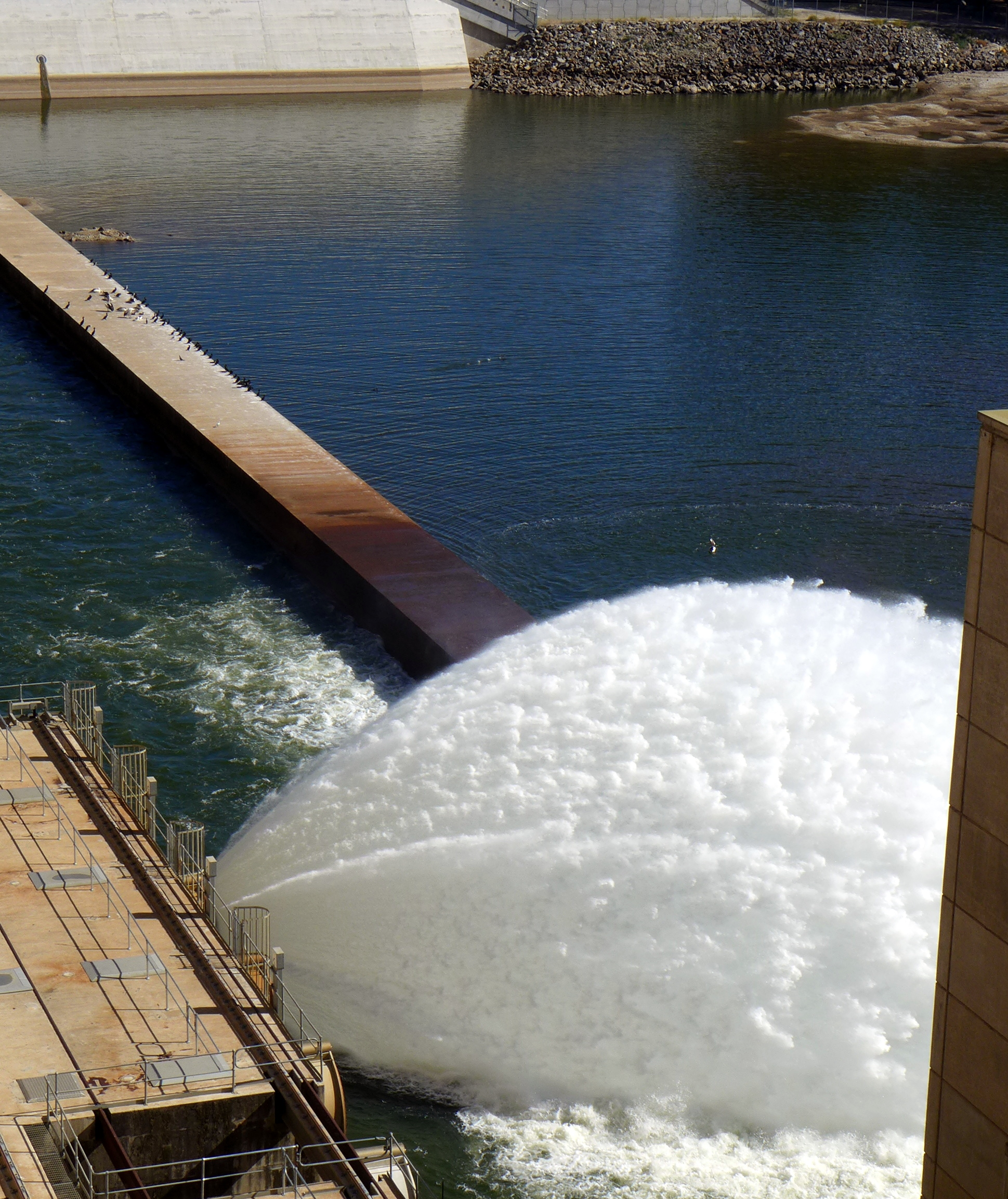
Outflow, 2014

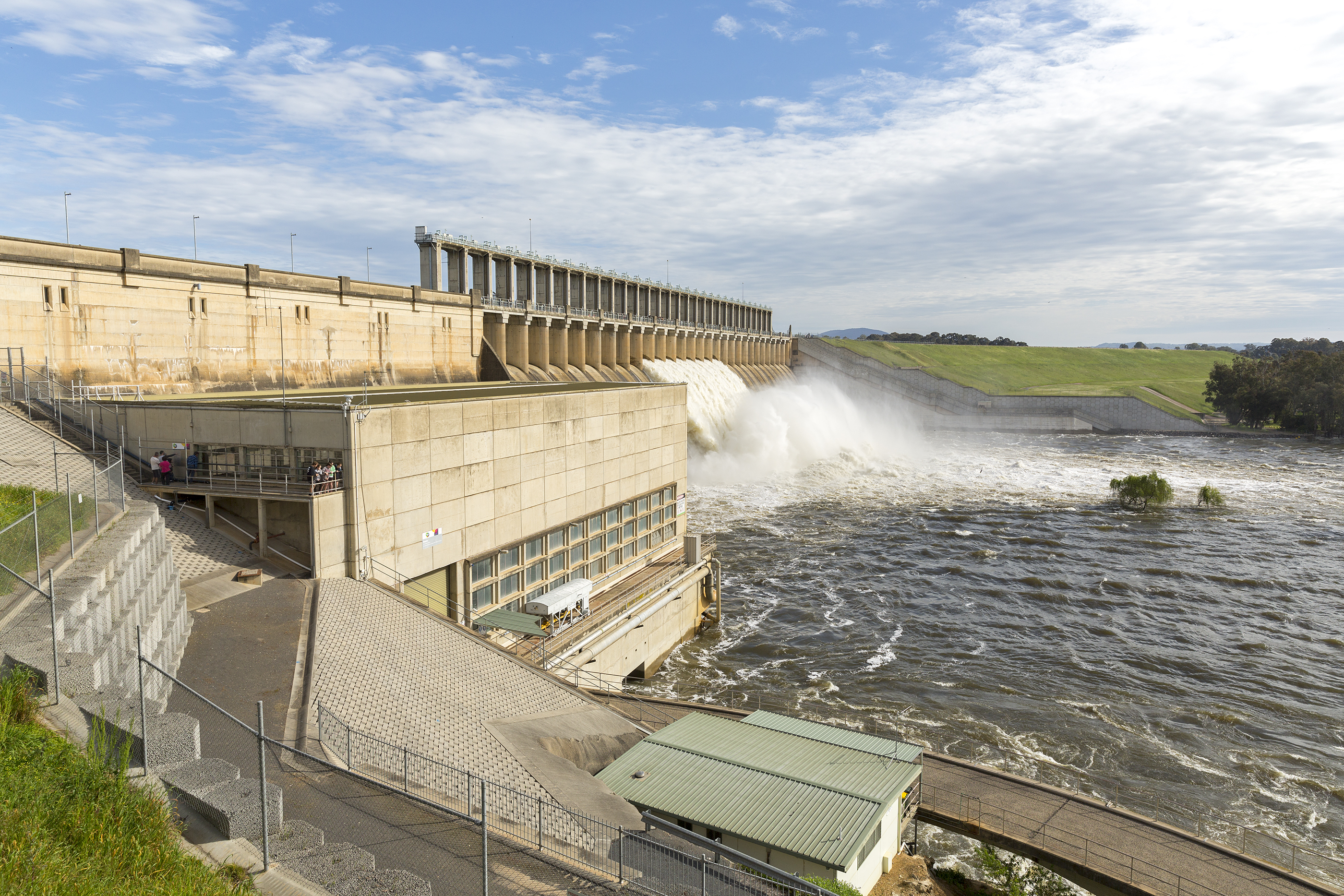
The dam wall and power station, 2016

== See also ==
- Hume Weir Motor Racing Circuit
- Irrigation in Australia
- List of dams and reservoirs in New South Wales
- 1931 - Ovens & Murray FL Premiers: Weir United FC team photo
