= Canals in Australia =

Elwood Canal E from Ruskin

There are few canals in Australia. Of the canals constructed, only a small number are navigable waterways. The following list provides a summary of known navigable waterways and other types of constructed or artificial waterways in Australia.

== New South Wales ==
=== Alexandra Canal ===
Alexandra Canal is a tributary of the Cooks River, in southern Sydney, which was constructed along a 4-kilometre (2.5 mi) route from the inner Sydney suburb of Alexandria, through the St Peters and Mascot, past Sydney's Sydney Airport to the Cooks River at Tempe, eventually discharging into Botany Bay. The canal is 60 metres (200 ft) wide, increasing to 80 metres (260 ft) at its mouth and is one of only two navigable canals constructed in New South Wales.

=== Hawthorne Canal ===
Hawthorne Canal is an artificial waterway on a southern tributary of the Parramatta River, west of Sydney Harbour. It was constructed from January 1890 to improve drainage and provide ferry access operated by the Drummoyne – Leichhardt Ferry Company.

=== Berry's Canal ===
Berry's Canal was Australia's first transport canal. In June 1822, Alexander Berry sailed his 15-tonne cutter Blanche from Sydney 150 km down the south coast to the Shoalhaven loaded with tools and provisions. Hamilton Hume, who later became a well-known explorer, was also on board. On 21 June 1822, the entrance to Shoalhaven Heads appeared dangerous and four men volunteered to test it in the cutter's boat. The boat capsized drowning two of the men. Berry then sailed up the Crookhaven River but was stopped by a sand spit. Undaunted, the crew hauled the Blanche across the spit. Four days later Hamilton Hume was left with three men at the isthmus to cut a passage using only hand tools. The canal, which was 191 m long, was completed in 12 days. This was the first transport canal to be cut in Australia. The river has since cut the passage wider and deeper to its present dimensions, making it now the real entrance to the Shoalhaven River.

=== Mulwala Canal ===
Mulwala Canal is an irrigation canal in the Southern Riverina region of New South Wales, and is the largest irrigation canal in the Southern Hemisphere. The canal, starting at Lake Mulwala, diverts water from the Murray River across the Southern Riverina plain to the Edward River at Deniliquin. The canal is 156 km long. The channel has an offtake capacity of 10,000 megalitres (ML) per day and annually supplies over 1,000,000 ML to 700,000 hectares (1,700,000 acres) in the Murray Irrigation Area. Constructed between 1935 and 1943, the canal not only provides water for agriculture, but also for the towns of Berrigan, Finley, Bunnaloo and Wakool.

=== North Creek Canal ===
A short canal was built linking North Creek to the Richmond River at Ballina to allow cane barges to reach the sugar mill at Broadwater without having to pass near the difficult and unstable bar at the mouth of the Richmond River. Although no longer used for this purpose, it remains a navigable waterway.

== Queensland ==
=== Schulz Canal ===
Schulz Canal is an artificial waterway in Nundah, Queensland that enters Moreton Bay. It was constructed in the 1940s as a flood mitigation measure and is named after Toombul shire alderman William Schulz.

== Tasmania ==
Canal at Port Arthur Tasmania in Nov 2010

=== Denison Canal ===
The Denison Canal is a man-made waterway at Dunalley in southern Tasmania across the East Bay Neck of the Tasman Peninsula. It was constructed in 1905 to shorten the fishing and trade routes between the east coast and Hobart. It is named after Governor William Denison.

42.890052°S 147.807655°E

== Victoria ==
=== Coode Canal ===
The Coode Canal was constructed in 1886–92, to designs for Sir John Coode by the Melbourne Harbor Trust to shorten and straighten the route up the Yarra River to Melbourne's docks.

=== Sale Canal ===
The Sale Canal was commenced in the 1880s, to a design of Sir John Coode linking the town via the Thomson River and the Gippsland Lakes to the open sea. It was completed in 1890, with the Sale Swing Bridge built in 1883 across the canal along with a high wharf, and a launching ramp. It is longest true canal in Australia at about 5 km long.

=== Coal Canal, West Melbourne ===
The Coal Canal was constructed in the 1870s and 80s, initially as part of the drainage works for reclaiming the West Melbourne Swamp, and was enlarged to allow coal barges to unload imported coal for the North Melbourne Locomotive Depot.

=== Elwood Canal ===
The Elwood Canal began construction in May 1889 under the supervision of municipal engineer Carlo Catani (22 April 1852–20 July 1918). The Elwood area was originally low-lying wetlands surrounding Elster Creek until the canal was constructed to drain the wetlands and make it a habitable area. Construction commenced in May 1889, with the contractors, Messrs Hendon, Clarke & Anderson, engaging sixty workmen at a cost of £14,000.

=== Maribyrnong Explosives Magazine Canal ===
The Marbyrnong Explosives Magazine Canal was constructed in 1875-76 and opened in 1878, as part of the large Victorian government explosives reserve, known as Jack's Magazine. The magazine was intended for bonded storage of all gunpowder coming into the colony, and was used for both military and industry, in particular the growing hard rock mining industry. Barges transferred explosives from ships in Hobsons Bay up the Maribyrnong River and into the 400m long canal then, offload at the canal dock just outside the magazine walls. A tramway also ran along the length of the canal, with another section going from the loading dock into the magazine proper.

37.780823°S 144.896171°E

== Western Australia ==
=== Burswood Canal ===
Burswood Canal was constructed in the 1830s across a meander bend of the Swan River at Burswood. It was made to shorten the journey on the Swan river, between Fremantle and Guildford.

It is bridged by the south western railway. and a road bridge was built as well.

=== Mandurah canals ===
Mandurah canals are a network of several canal estates in the Peel region, the canals located in Mandurah connect to the Mandurah estuary, while the canals at Wannanup connect to the Dawesville Channel, the oldest of the canals, constructed at South Yunderup by the early 1970s connect to the Peel Inlet and the Murray river.
