= Mulwala Bridge =

Road bridge over the Murray River, Australia

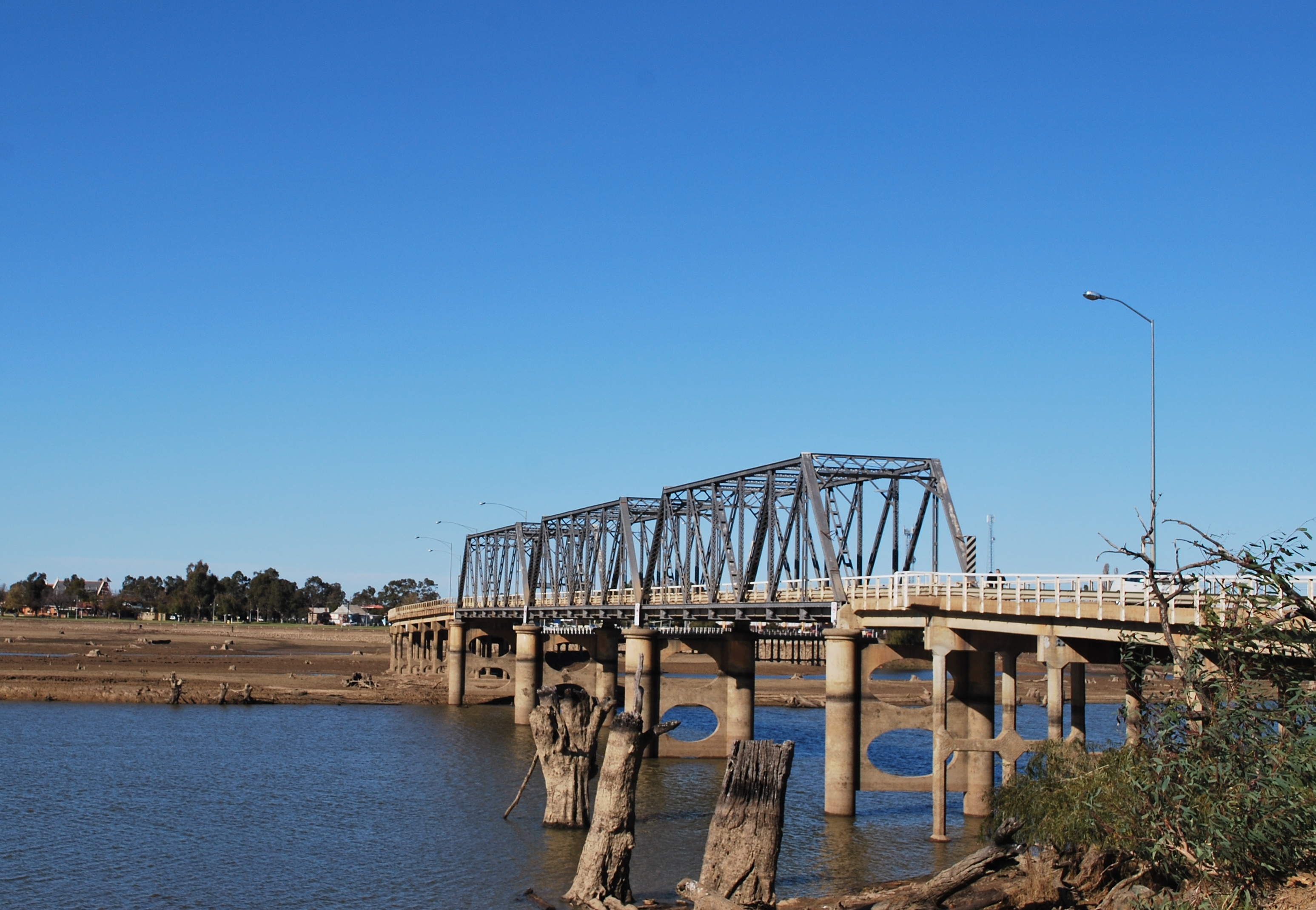
- The Mulwala Bridge over an empty Lake Mulwala, in 2009. Yarrawonga can be seen on the far side of the empty lake and the original path of the Murray River is clearly visible.
- Coordinates: 36°00′15″S 146°00′15″E
- Carries: Motor vehicles, pedestrians
- Crosses: Lake Mulwala, Murray River
- Locale: Mulwala, New South Wales, Australia
- Other name: Melbourne Street Bridge
- Named for: Mulwala
- Owner: Transport for New South Wales; VicRoads
- Maintained by: Transport for New South Wales
- Preceded by: John Foord Bridge
- Followed by: Yarrawonga Rail Bridge

Characteristics
- Design: Pratt truss
- Material: Steel
- Trough construction: Concrete
- Pier construction: Concrete
- Total length: 488 m (1,601 ft)
- No. of spans: 3
- No. of lanes: 2

History
- Designer: Percy Allan
- Construction start: 1917
- Construction end: 1924
- Replaces: Wooden bridge (1891)

Statistics
- Daily traffic: c.8,500 vehicles

Location
- Interactive map of Mulwala Bridge

The Mulwala Bridge is a road bridge that crosses the Murray River and connects Yarrawonga in Victoria and Mulwala in New South Wales, Australia. Completed in 1924, the Pratt truss bridge was designed by Percy Allan. The bridge spans Lake Mulwala, a reservoir formed by the Yarrawonga Weir, and forms part of the border between New South Wales and Victoria.

== History ==
The first formal crossing of the river between Mulwala village and the growing town of Yarrawonga was via a punt. A wooden bridge was built between 1889 and 1891, and was the first road bridge built across the river. The lift bridge had four McDonald truss spans, the longest of which was 14.1 metres (46 ft). Customs were collected for trade and passage across the bridge between the two colonies. However, by 1915, the timber bridge started to become unsafe. Remnants of the wooden pylons from the original bridge can be seen when water levels in the lake are low.

Commenced in 1917 and completed in 1924, the two-laned road bridge bridge was started from both ends, by the Victorian and NSW state governments. However, they did not coordinate their efforts, As a result the bridge has a dip and a bend in the middle to make the two ends meet. Jointly owned by the respective state governments, the bridge is maintained by Transport for New South Wales, with costs shared equally.

The bridge was added to the New South Wales Heritage Inventory in 1999 as an item of local significance.

== Proposed new crossing ==
Since the late 1990s, there have been calls to replace the bridge. In 2013, following Phase II of the Yarrawonga-Mulwala Bridge Planning Study, three routes were proposed for a new bridge:

- 'green' – aligned with the railway bridge, located approximately 200 metres (660 ft) to the west of the existing bridge;
- 'yellow' – located approximately 150 metres (490 ft) west of the existing bridge; and
- 'grey' – located approximately 75 metres (246 ft) west of the existing bridge.

In 2015, both the NSW and Victorian government endorsed the 'grey' route as the preferred option. Following local plebiscites endorsing the 'green' route, further community consultation took place during 2021, and in July 2022, the NSW Government changed its decision to endorse the 'green' route. A further study of options was considered by the Victorian Government in 2025, and they also changed their decision and endorsed the 'green' route in February 2026. As of May 2026, the project was unfunded.

== Adjacent crossings ==
A small bridge along the weir that served as a road crossing of the Murray was in operation from 1939 until its closure to motor vehicles in 2021, in order to protect the structural integrity of the weir.

== Gallery ==
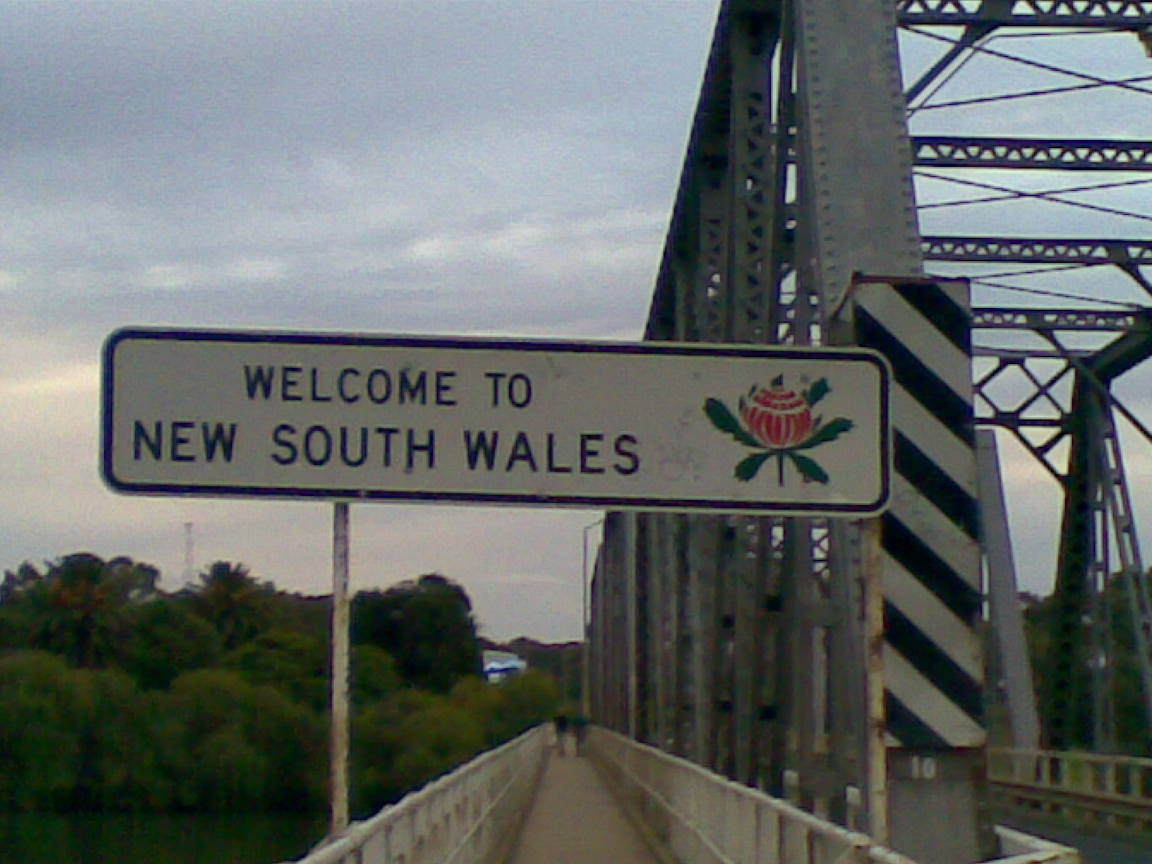
A sign mid-way across the bridge, entering the Pratt truss section, from the south-west

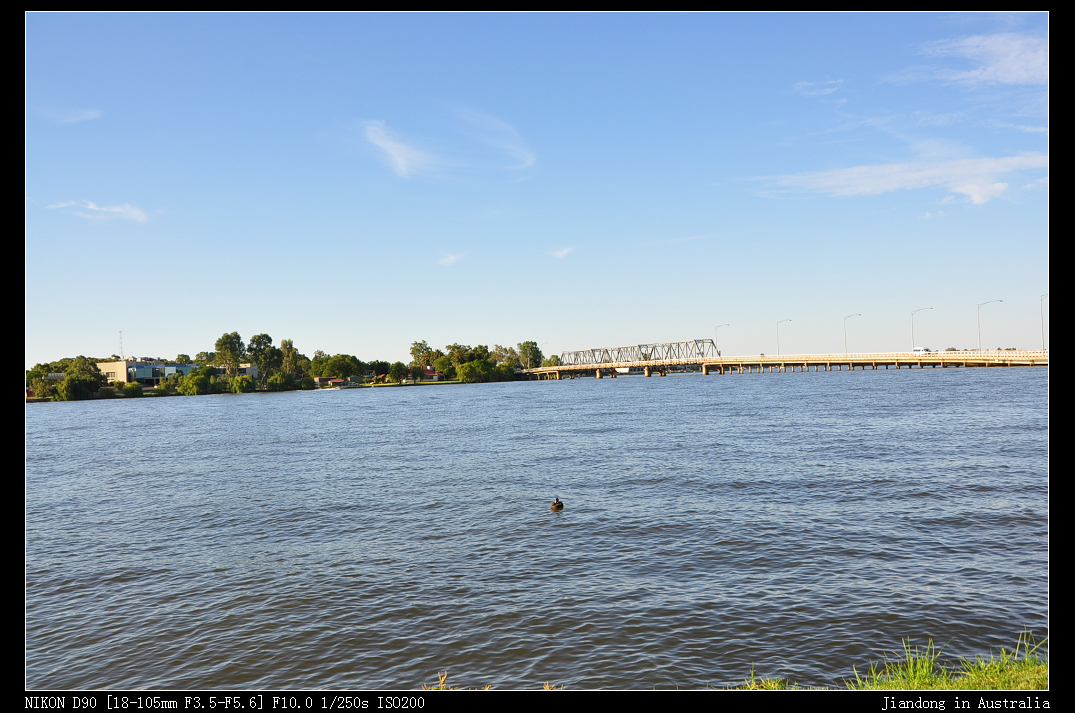
Viewed from Yarrawonga, looking north-east across the lake towards Mulwala

== See also ==
- List of crossings of the Murray River
- List of bridges in Australia

Next bridge upstream	Murray River	Next bridge downstream
Yarrawonga railway bridge	Mulwala Bridge	Gonn Crossing Bridge
