= Mulwala Canal =

Canal in New South Wales, Australia

Coordinates: 35°58′48″S 146°00′27″E

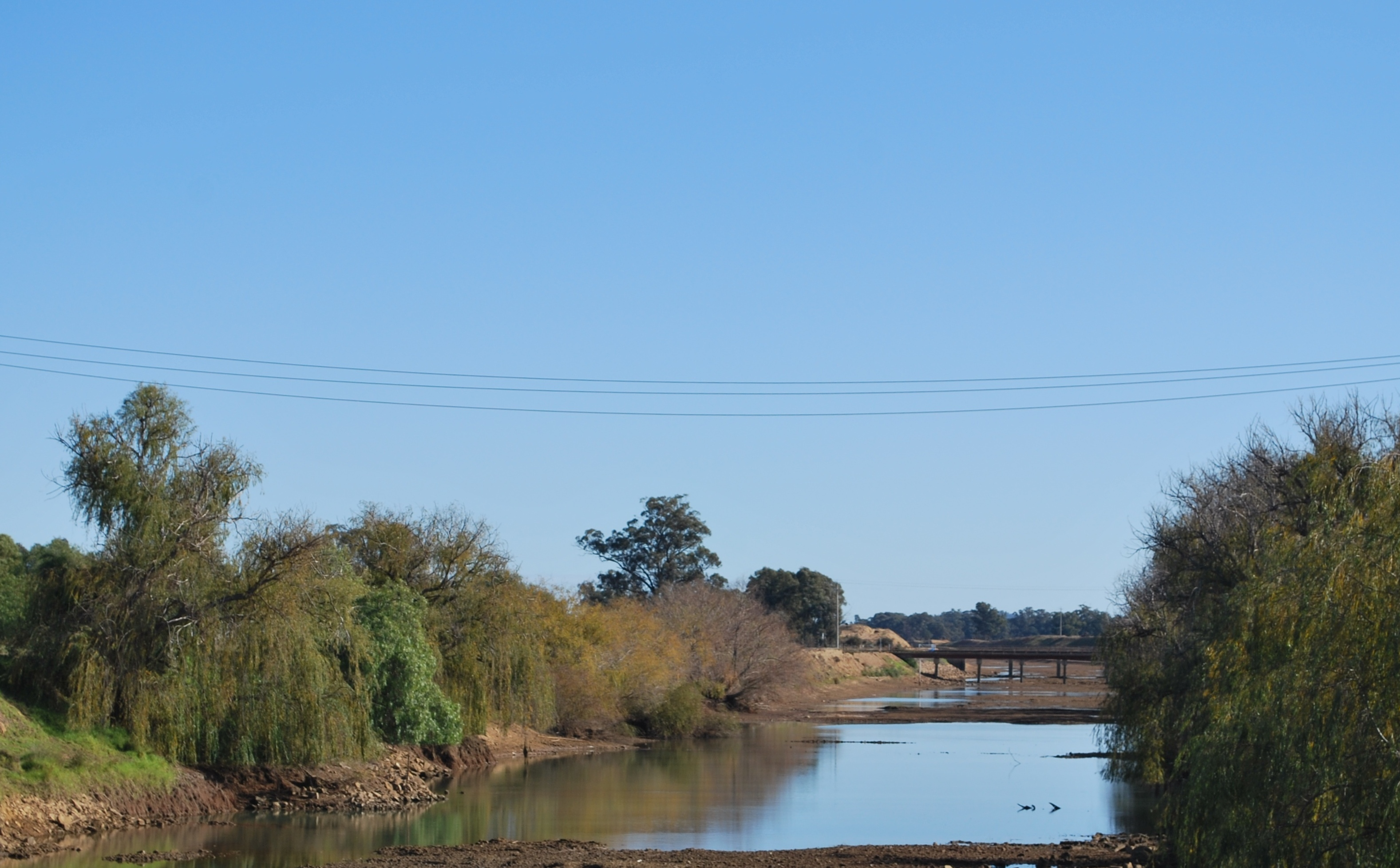
- The Mulwala Canal immediately upstream from its intake from Lake Mulwala in Mulwala
- Interactive map of Mulwala Canal

History
- Modern name: Mulwala Canal Offtake
- Construction began: 23 March 1935

The Mulwala Canal is an irrigation canal in the southern Riverina region of New South Wales, Australia. It is the largest irrigation canal in the Southern Hemisphere. The canal, which starts at Lake Mulwala, diverts water from the Murray River across the southern Riverina plain to the Edward River at Deniliquin.

The canal, which was constructed between 1935 and 1942, is 156 km long. The channel has an offtake capacity of 10,000 megalitres (ML) per day and annually supplies over 1,000,000 ML to 700,000 hectares (1,700,000 acres) in the Murray Irrigation Area.

As well as water for agriculture, the canal also provides water for the southern Riverina towns of Berrigan, Finley, Bunnaloo and Wakool.

Pacific Blue operates The Drop Hydro hydroelectric power station on the canal, near Berrigan. The power station, with a generating capacity of 2.5 MW, is the first hydroelectric power station in Australia on an irrigation canal.

== See also ==
- Canals in Australia
