= Murray Irrigation Area =

Irrigation area in New South Wales, Australia

Coordinates: 35°31′20″S 144°57′38″E

The Murray Irrigation Area is geographically located within the Riverina area of New South Wales, between Mulwala and Moulamein. It was created to control and divert the flow of local river and creek systems for the purpose of food production. The main river system feeding and fed by the area is the Murray River.

Much of the water is supplied via the Mulwala Canal, flowing from Lake Mulwala. Water supply is provided by Murray Irrigation Limited, a company formed by the New South Wales government in 1995. Murray Irrigation purchases water directly from the New South Wales State Water Corporation.

The system is regarded as a major engineering achievement comprising an elaborate series of weirs, canals and holding ponds (fed by upstream rivers and dams), including the large Lawson syphon where the Mulwala Canal flows under the Edward River.

Anabranches of the Murray including the Edward River and the Wakool River are also managed to provide irrigation water to irrigators along those waterways. Managed flow along those waterways bears little correlation to natural flow regimes, with peak flows occurring during peak irrigation demand (summer) rather than during peak runoff (early spring).

Irrigated agriculture is the main industry of the towns within the area which include Finley, Deniliquin and Jerilderie.

The irrigation area has become increasingly controversial in the early 21st century, after consecutive years of drought and a growing Australian population have led to demands for greater levels of water conservation.
