= Burswood canal =

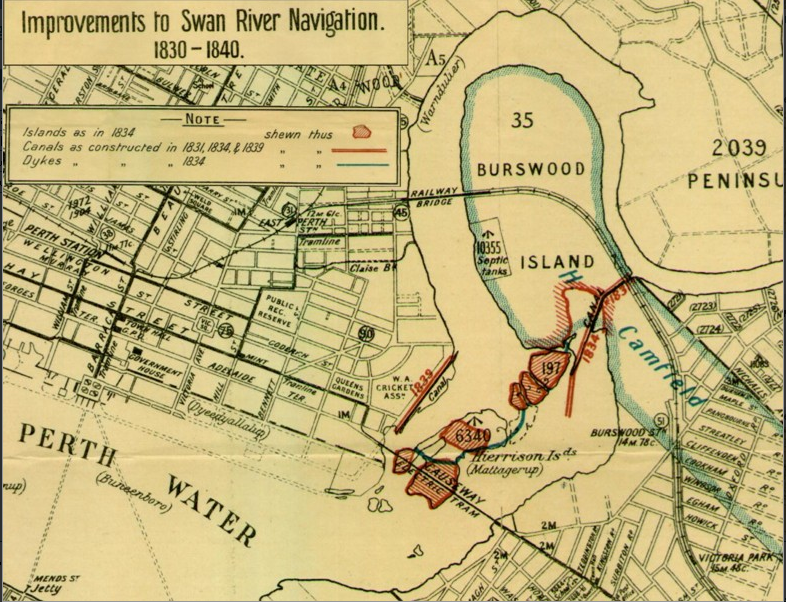
- Burswood canal

General information
- Type: Heritage listed canal
- Location: Burswood, Western Australia
- Coordinates: 31°57′20″S 115°53′39″E

Western Australia Heritage Register
- Type: State Registered Place
- Designated: 24 September 2004
- Reference no.: 3570

Burswood canal was one of the earliest public works conducted in the Swan River Colony (now Western Australia) on the Burswood peninsula on the Swan River in the 1830s. It was made to shorten the journey on the Swan River, between Fremantle and Guildford. At that time Guildford was more prominent than Perth.

It was located in what is now Burswood. When the South Western Railway line over the area was built – a small bridge was made over the canal, and a road bridge was built as well.

== See also ==
- Canals in Australia
