= The Drop Hydro =

Power station in New South Wales, Australia

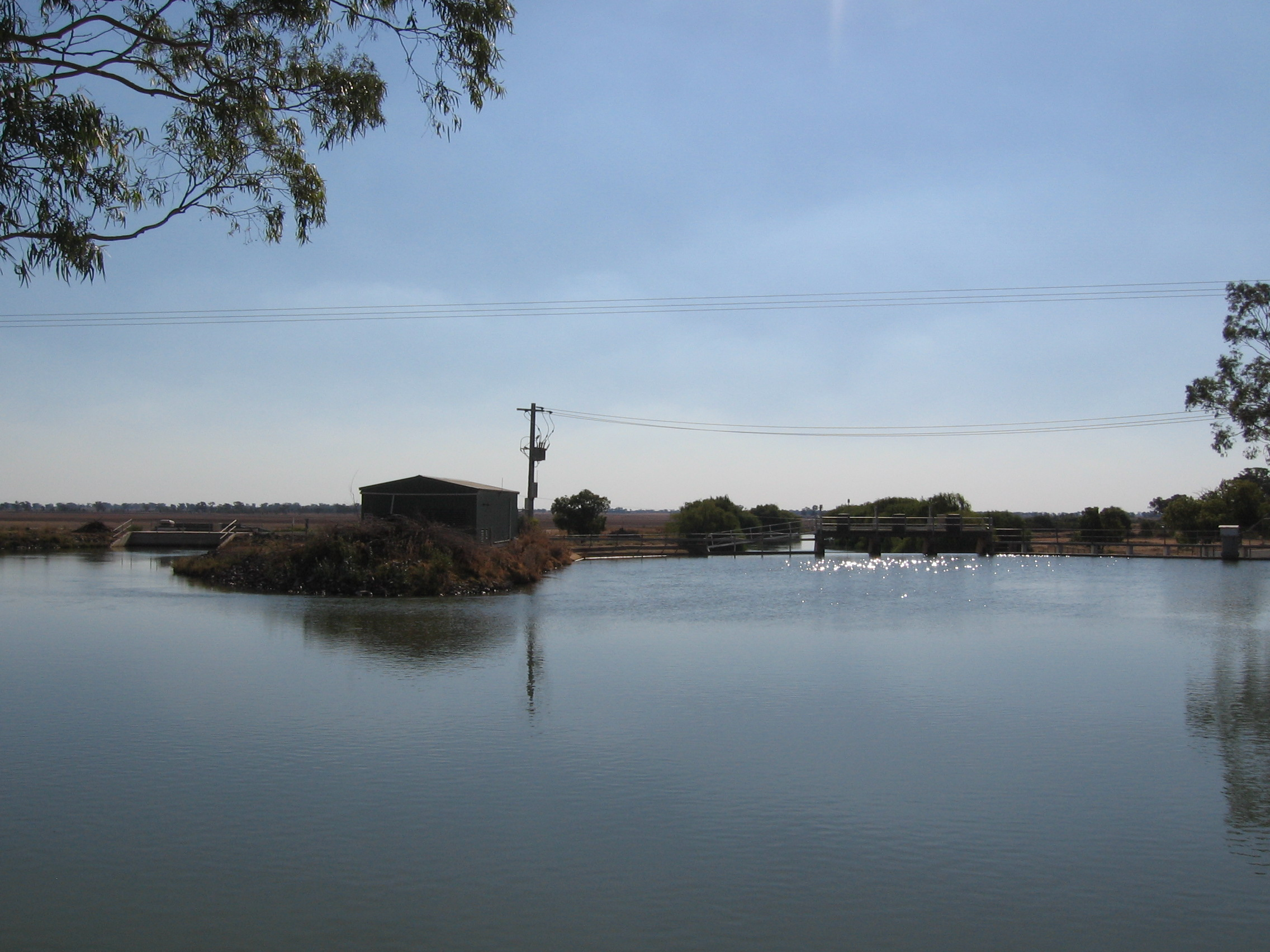
- "The Drop" on the Mulwala canal, 2007
- Country: Australia
- Location: Melrose Lane, Lalalty
- Coordinates: 35°46′34″S 145°45′12″E
- Commission date: 2000

Power generation
- Nameplate capacity: 2.5 MW

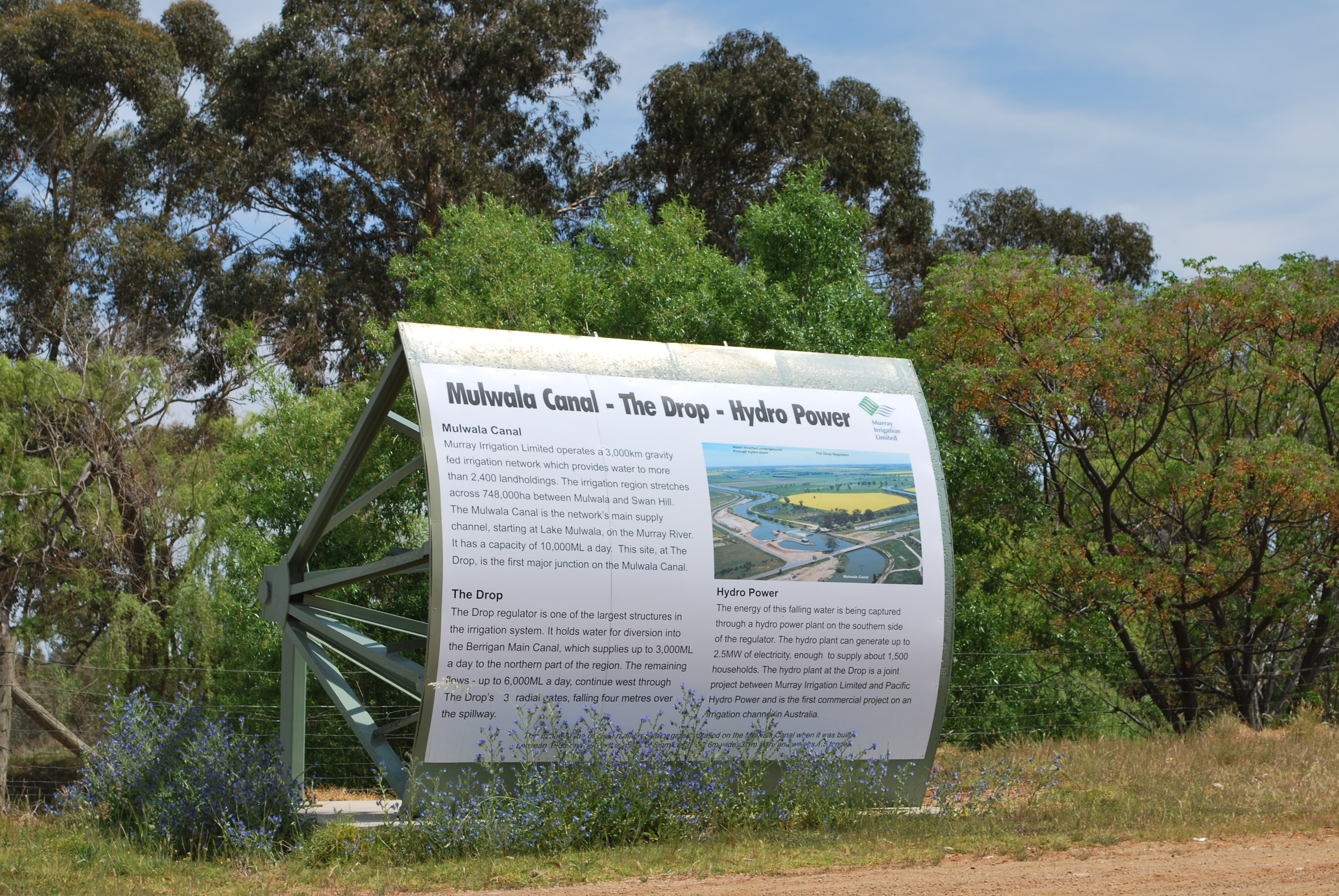
Sign at "The Drop"

The Drop Hydro Power Station is a hydroelectric power station on the Mulwala Canal, near Berrigan, New South Wales, Australia, built and operated by Pacific Blue . It has one turbine, with a generating capacity of 2.5 megawatts (3,400 hp) of electricity.

The power station was completed in November 2002, and is the first hydroelectric power station in Australia to be built on an irrigation canal.
