= Yarrawonga Weir =

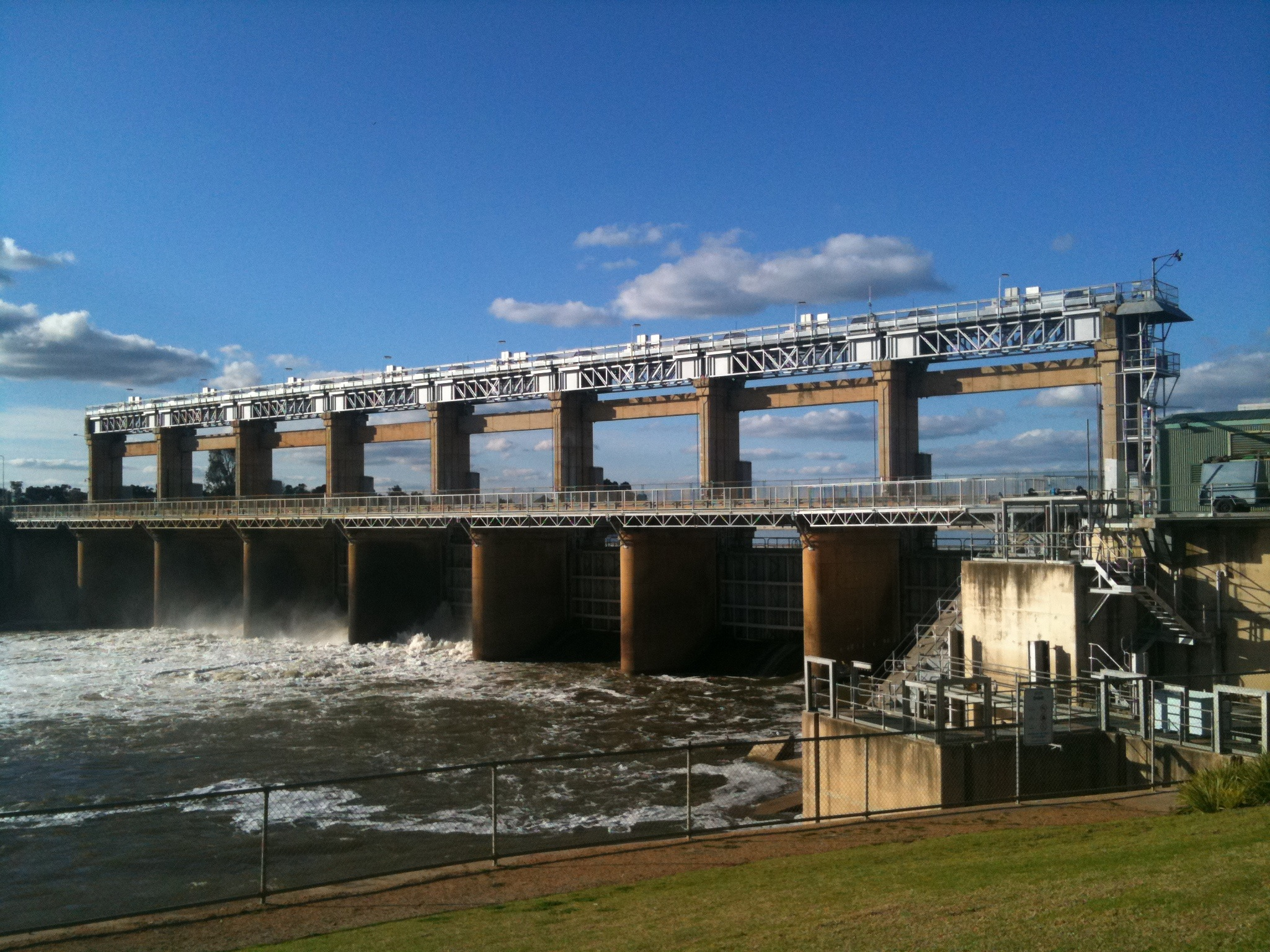
- The weir in 2010

- Location of the weir and reservoir on the Victoria–New South Wales border
- Interactive map of Yarrawonga Weir
- Country: Australia
- Location: Yarrawonga, Hume region, Victoria; Mulwala, Riverina region, New South Wales
- Coordinates: 36°00′S 146°05′E
- Purpose: Irrigation; Regulation of river flow; Hydroelectricity
- Status: Operational
- Construction began: 1935
- Opening date: 1939
- Owner: Murray–Darling Basin Authority
- Operator: Goulburn–Murray Water

Dam and spillways
- Type of dam: Earth fill dam
- Impounds: Murray River; Ovens River
- Height (foundation): 22 m (72 ft)
- Length: 489 m (1,604 ft)
- Dam volume: 126×10^{3} m^{3} (4.4×10^{6} cu ft)
- Spillways: 10
- Spillway type: Controlled ogee crest
- Spillway length: 116 m (381 ft) (south); 30 m (98 ft) (north)
- Spillway capacity: 3,540 m^{3}/s (125,000 cu ft/s)

Reservoir
- Creates: Lake Mulwala
- Total capacity: 117.5 GL (95,300 acre⋅ft)
- Inactive capacity: 113 GL (92,000 acre⋅ft)
- Catchment area: 26,100 km^{2} (10,100 sq mi)
- Surface area: 4,390 ha (10,800 acres)
- Normal elevation: 124.895 m (409.76 ft) AHD

Yarrawonga Weir Power Station
- Coordinates: 36°0′33.5″S 145°59′56.4″E
- Operator: AGL Energy
- Commission date: June 1994
- Type: Run-of-the-river
- Hydraulic head: 3 m (9.8 ft)
- Turbines: 2 x 4.75 MW (6,370 hp) (Kaplan-type)
- Installed capacity: 9.6 MW (12,900 hp)
- Annual generation: 50 gigawatt-hours (180 TJ)
- Website g-mwater.com.au

The Yarrawonga Weir is an earth-filled embankment dam across the Murray and Ovens rivers, located between Bundalong and Yarrawonga – in the Hume region of Victoria – and Mulwala – in the Riverina region of New South Wales – in eastern Australia. The weir, (Note: Technically, an earth-filled embankment dam.) situated in Victoria, was completed in 1939 to form the reservoir, Lake Mulwala, for the purposes of water supply for irrigation in the surrounding district, regulate river flow, and serve as a crossing of the Murray between Victoria and New South Wales. A hydroelectric power station and a fish lift were added in 1994.

Owned by the Murray–Darling Basin Authority, the dam and reservoir are operated by Goulburn–Murray Water. Transport for New South Wales manages the waterway and the NSW Department of Primary Industries manages fishing on the reservoir.

== Dam and reservoir overview ==
=== Dam ===
Situated on the lands of the Yorta Yorta people, the earth-filled dam wall is 22 metres (72 ft) high and 489 metres (1,604 ft) long. When full, at 124.895 metres (409.76 ft) above sea level, the resultant reservoir has a storage capacity of 117.5 gigalitres (95,300 acre⋅ft) and covers 4,390 hectares (10,800 acres), drawn from a catchment area of 26,100 square kilometres (10,100 sq mi).

The controlled ogee crest spillway has a discharge capacity of 3,540 cubic metres per second (125,000 cu ft/s). The spillway comprises two groups of gates – eight vertical lift gates on a 116-metre-long (381 ft) southern structure and two steel floodgates on a 30-metre-long (98 ft) northern structure. The southern side gates are used at all flow levels. The northern gates are only used during floods larger than 60 gigalitres (49,000 acre⋅ft) per day, to limit environmental damage on the downstream side of the embankment.

During time of high flows and floods, water takes approximately six days to reach the weir from the Murray's headwaters, some 540 kilometres (340 mi) to the east. The Yarrawonga Weir is the farthest downstream dam or weir across the Murray that does not have a navigation lock through it. The weir is 1,992 kilometres (1,238 mi) upriver from the river mouth, and is the largest of the fourteen weir across the Murray.

=== Reservoir ===
Below the weir, two gravity-fed channels supply water for irrigation. Developed as part of the Murray-Darling Irrigation Scheme, this irrigation project enhanced the productivity and prosperity of the district and provided opportunities for war veterans as part of a World War II–soldier settlement scheme. The Mulwala Canal, in New South Wales, has a discharge capacity of 10 gigalitres (8,100 acre⋅ft) per day. The Yarrawonga Main Channel, in Victoria, has a discharge capacity of 3.2 gigalitres (2,600 acre⋅ft) per day. Collectively, the channels release approximately 1,900 gigalitres (1,500,000 acre⋅ft) per annum to serve an irrigated area of approximately 8,000 square kilometres (3,100 sq mi). Despite having capacity of 117 gigalitres (95,000 acre⋅ft), in order to maintain full supply levels, 113 gigalitres (92,000 acre⋅ft) of the reservoir is inactive.

The weir serves as a regulator of the flow of the Murray to the Barmah Choke, near Tocumwal.

Recreational actives on Lake Mulwala include an annual water skiing championship, rowing and sailing regattas, a canoe race from Yarrawonga to Swan Hill, birdwatching, fishing, sailboarding, swimming, boating and guided paddle-boat cruising.

The reservoir is a renowned for the native Murray cod and is one of the few places where this Australian native freshwater fish is still reasonably common. The reservoir is a breeding ground for pelicans and it has several ibis rookeries. At 45 holes, the town of Yarrawonga has the largest golf course in Australia. Flooding of the area resulted in many Murray River Red Gums dying and their submerged trunks poke out of the reservoir.

Administered by Parks Victoria, Yarrawonga Regional Park is located adjacent to the reservoir, in Victoria.

== Hydroelectric power station ==
The Yarrawonga Weir Power Station is a run-of-the-river hydroelectric power station that was commissioned in 1994. With a generating capacity of 9.5 megawatts (12,700 hp), the station has two Kaplan turbines, each with a capacity to generate 4.75 megawatts (6,370 hp). Operated by AGL Energy, the station is connected to the Victorian electricity grid via a 22 kV transmission line, and has an average annual output of 50 gigawatt-hours (180 TJ).

== Bridges ==
The Mulwala Bridge, a road bridge across Lake Mulwala, was built between 1917 and 1924, before the weir was completed and the reservoir filled. The road replaced an earlier wooden bridge built between 1889 and 1891. The 1924 road bridge bridge was started from both ends, each by the respective state government. However, they did not coordinate their efforts, and the bridge has a dip and a bend in the middle to make the two ends meet.

Additionally, a small bridge along the weir served as a crossing of the Murray that was in operation from 1939 until its closure to motor vehicles in 2021, in order to protect the structural integrity of the weir.

The reservoir is also crossed by a railway bridge.

== Gallery ==
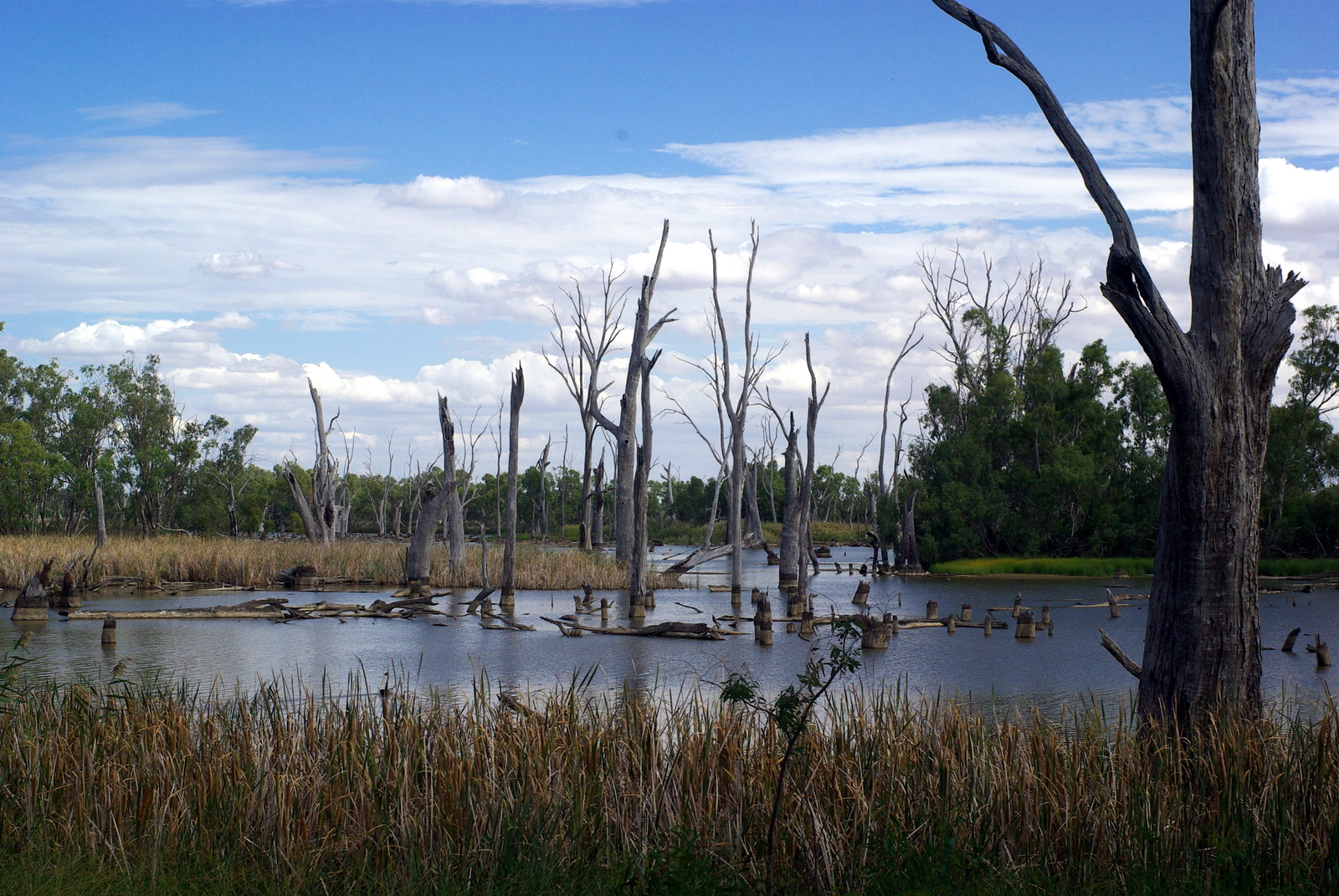
The eastern end of the reservoir

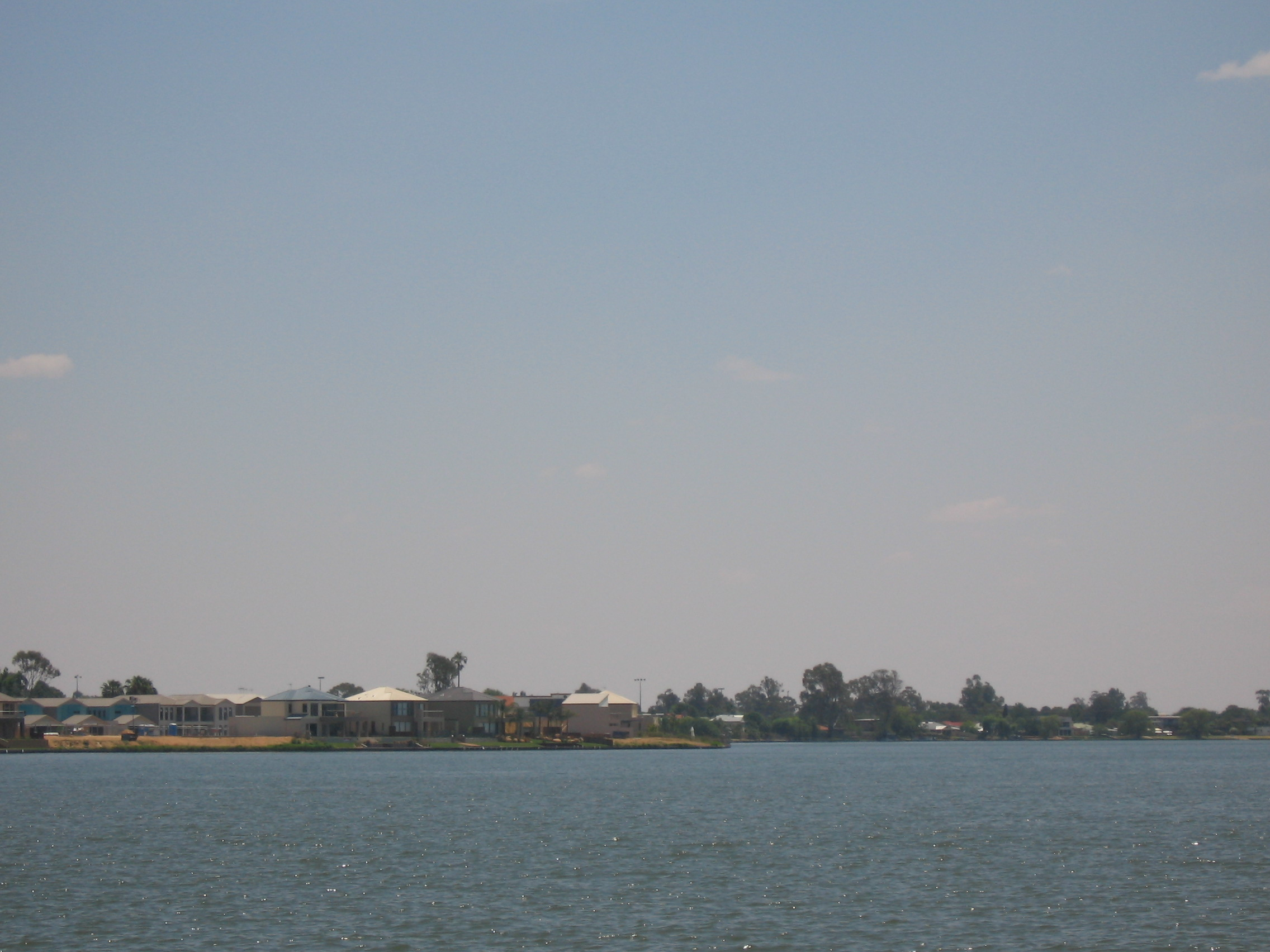
View from Yarrawonga to Mulwala

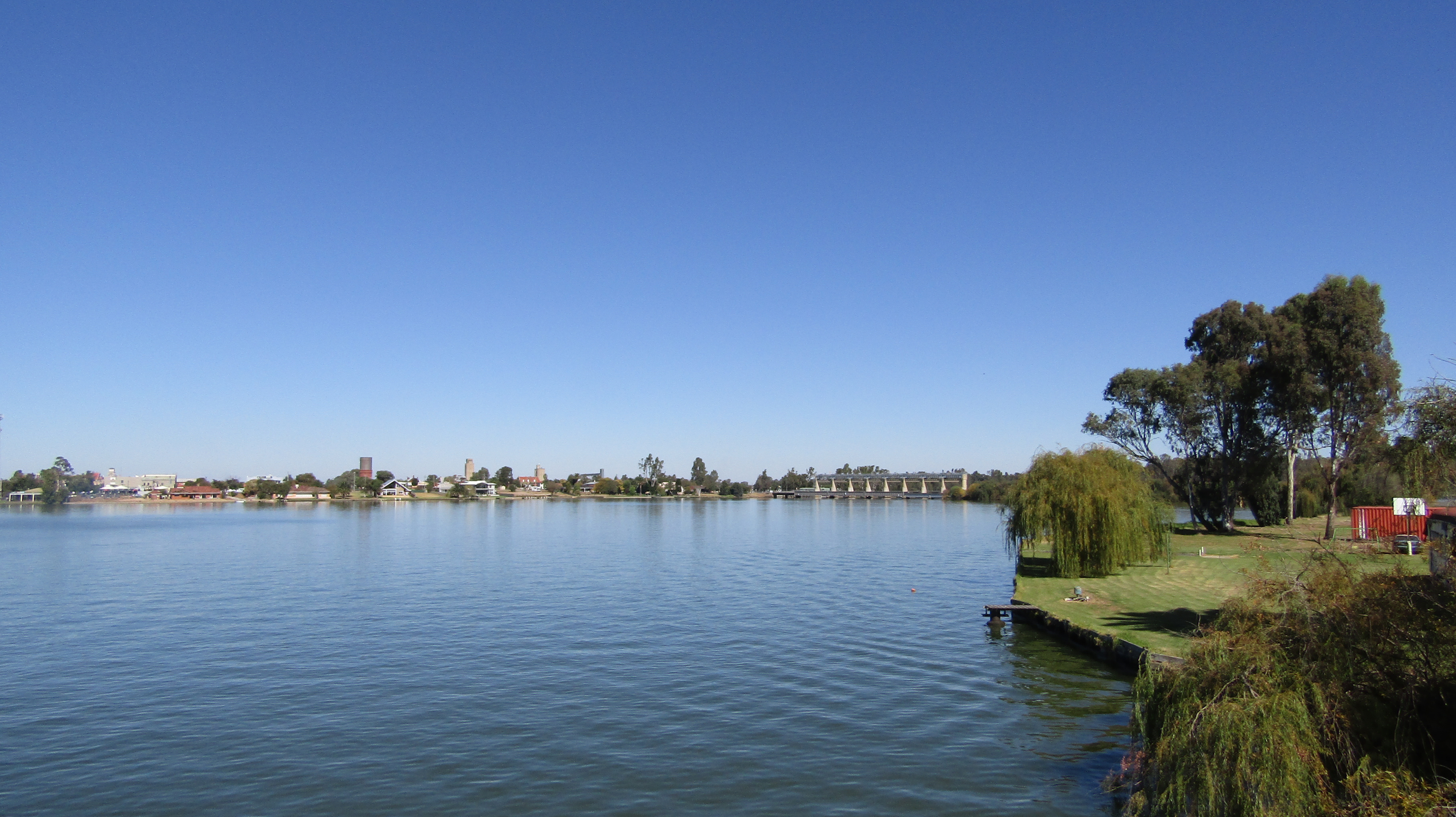
Lake Mulwala seen from Mulwala

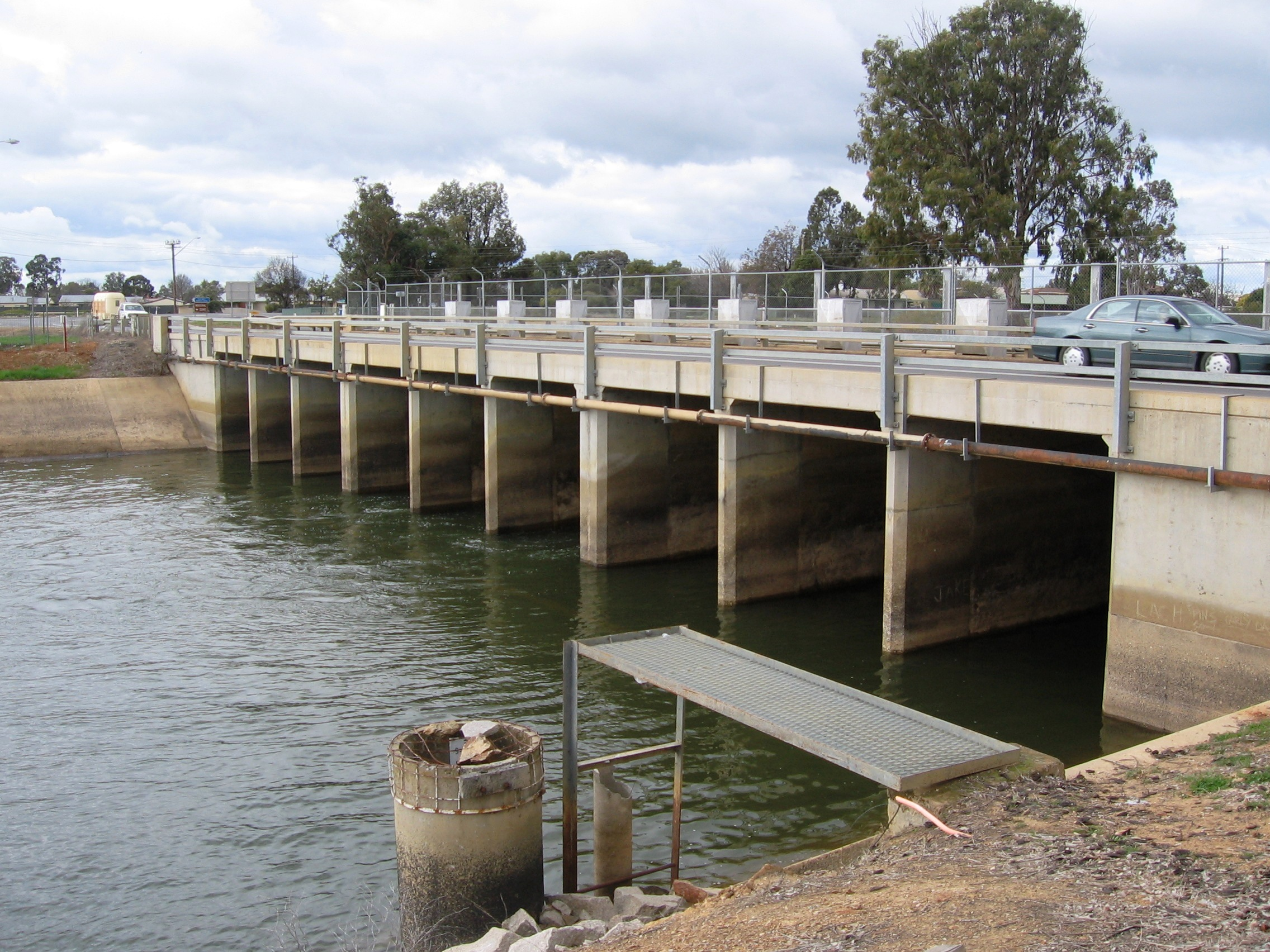
Mulwala Canal, near the weir

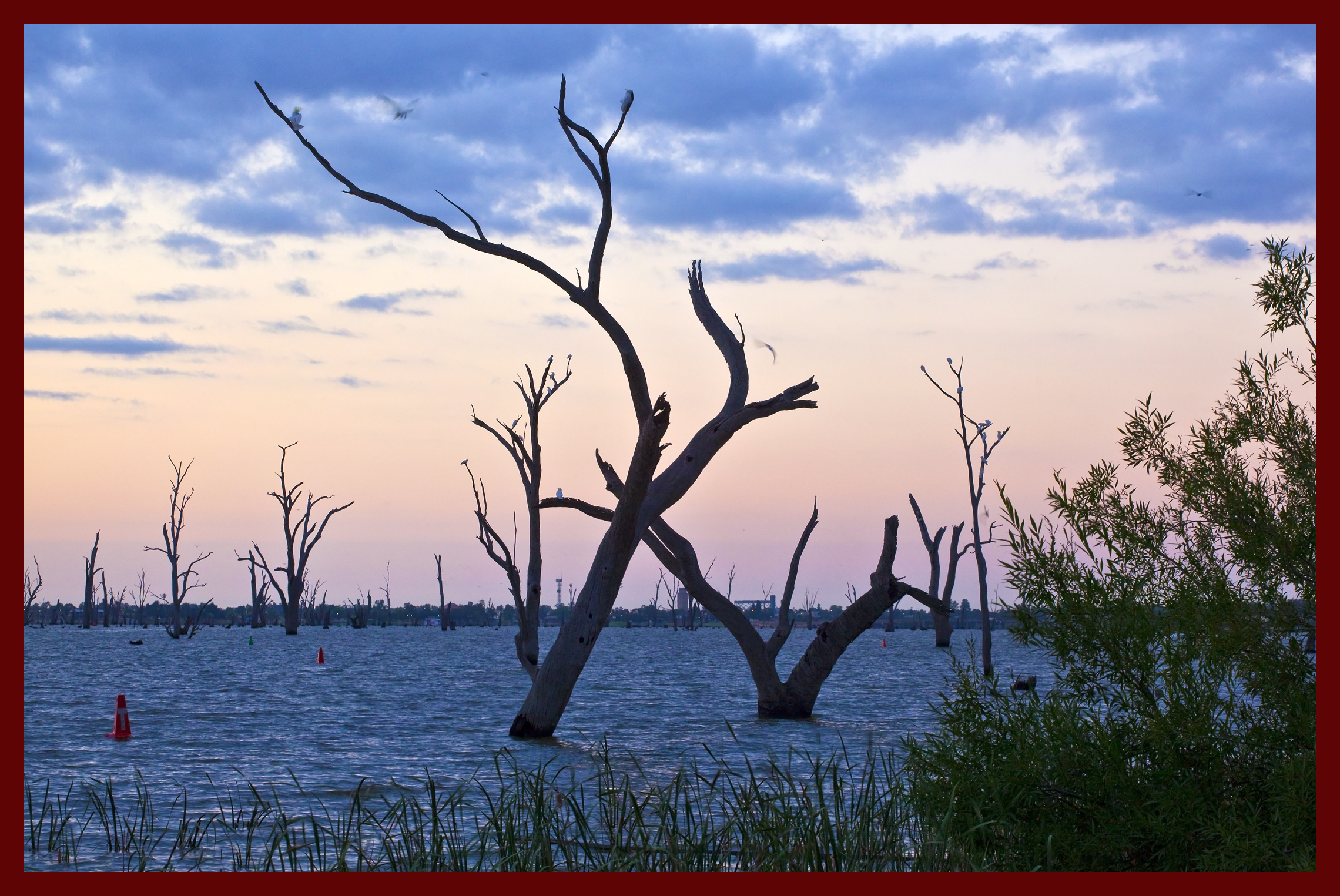
Sunrise over the lake

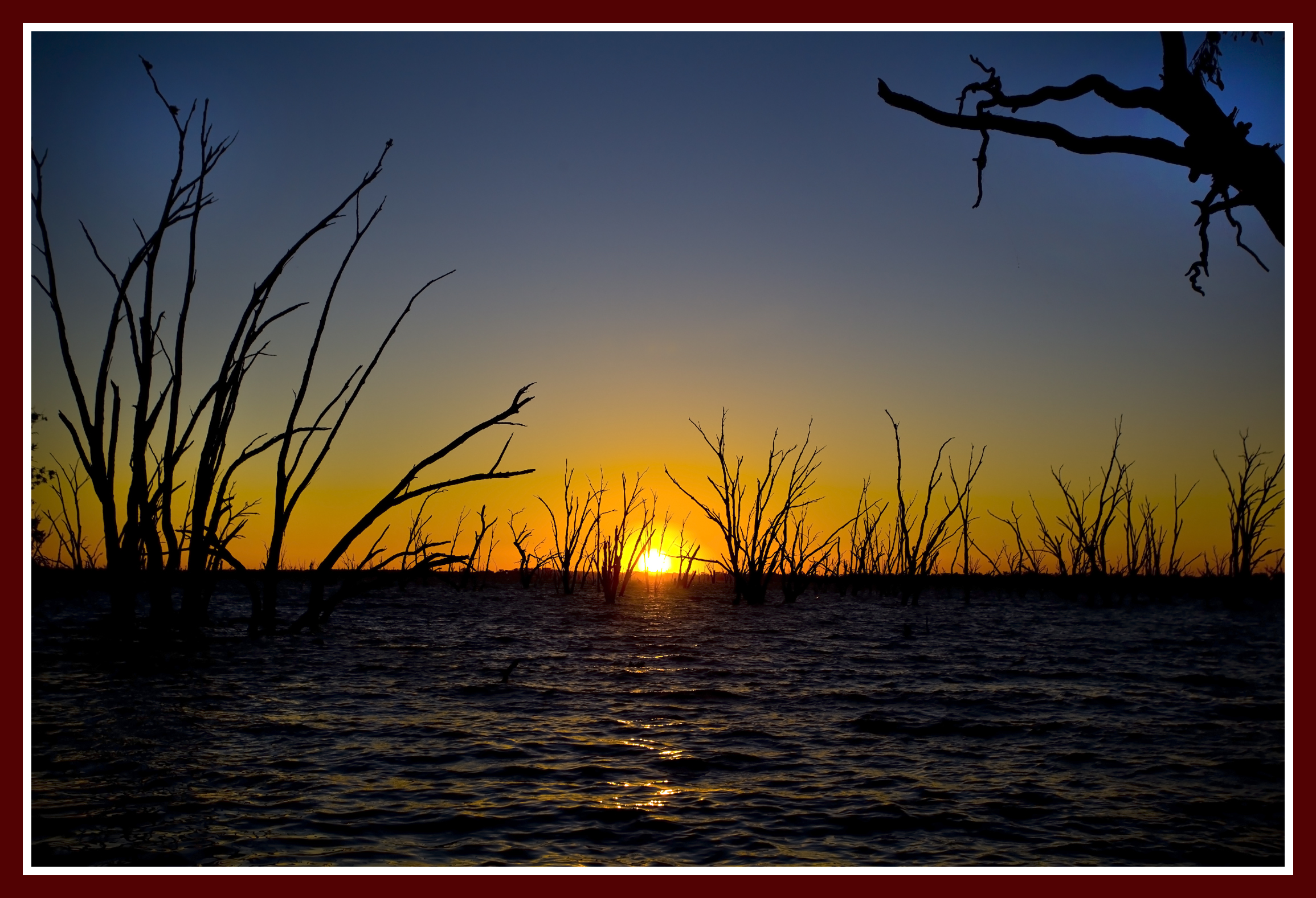
Sunset over the lake

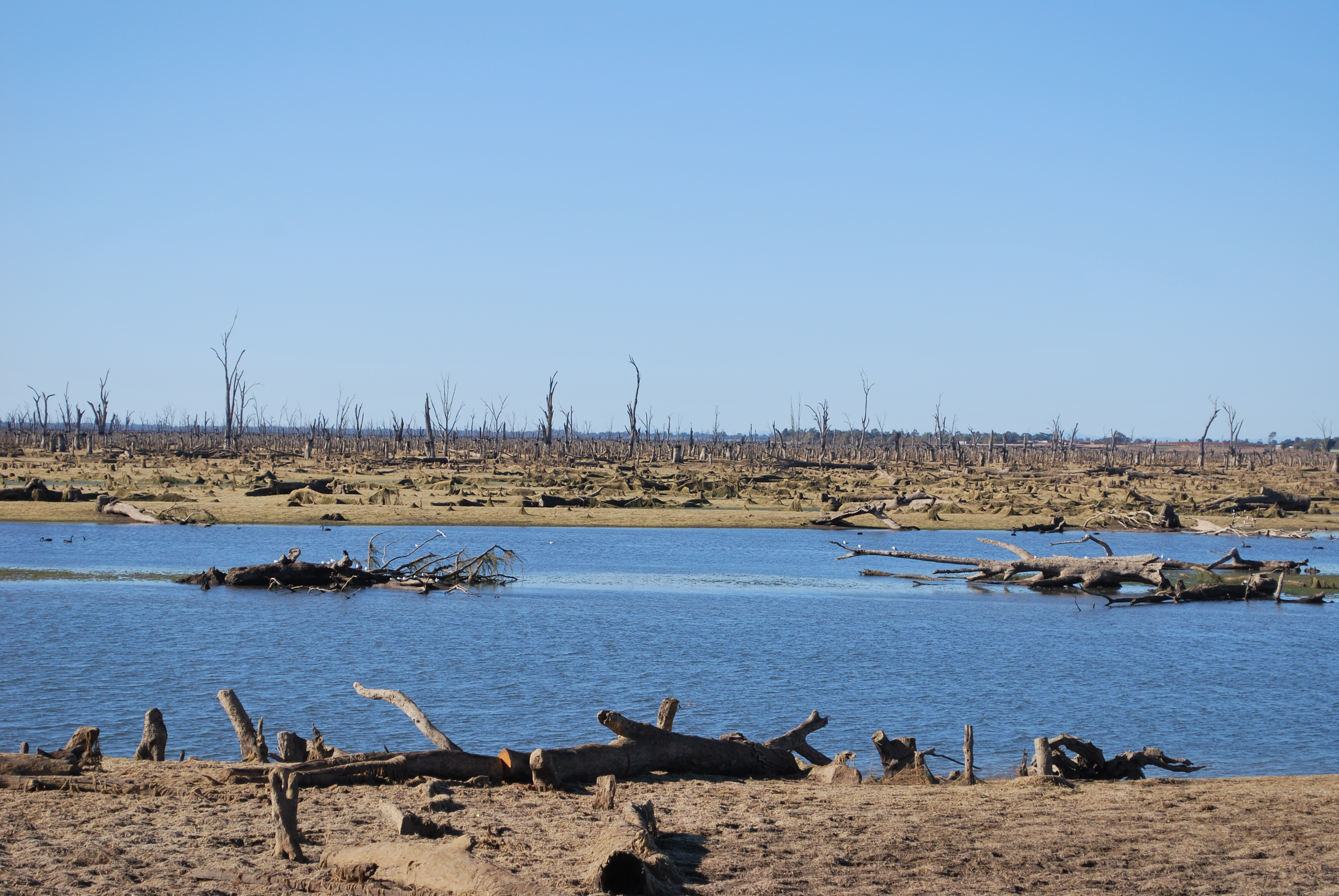
The river and lake in 2009

== See also ==
- List of power stations in Victoria
- List of reservoirs and dams in New South Wales
- List of reservoirs and dams in Victoria
- List of run-of-the-river hydroelectric power stations
- Irrigation in Australia

== Notes ==
Next crossing upstream	Murray River	Next crossing downstream
Yarrawonga Rail Bridge	Yarrawonga Weir	Cobram-Barooga Bridge
