= Murray River =

Longest river in Australia

Murray River River Murray Millewa / Dhungala (Tongala)
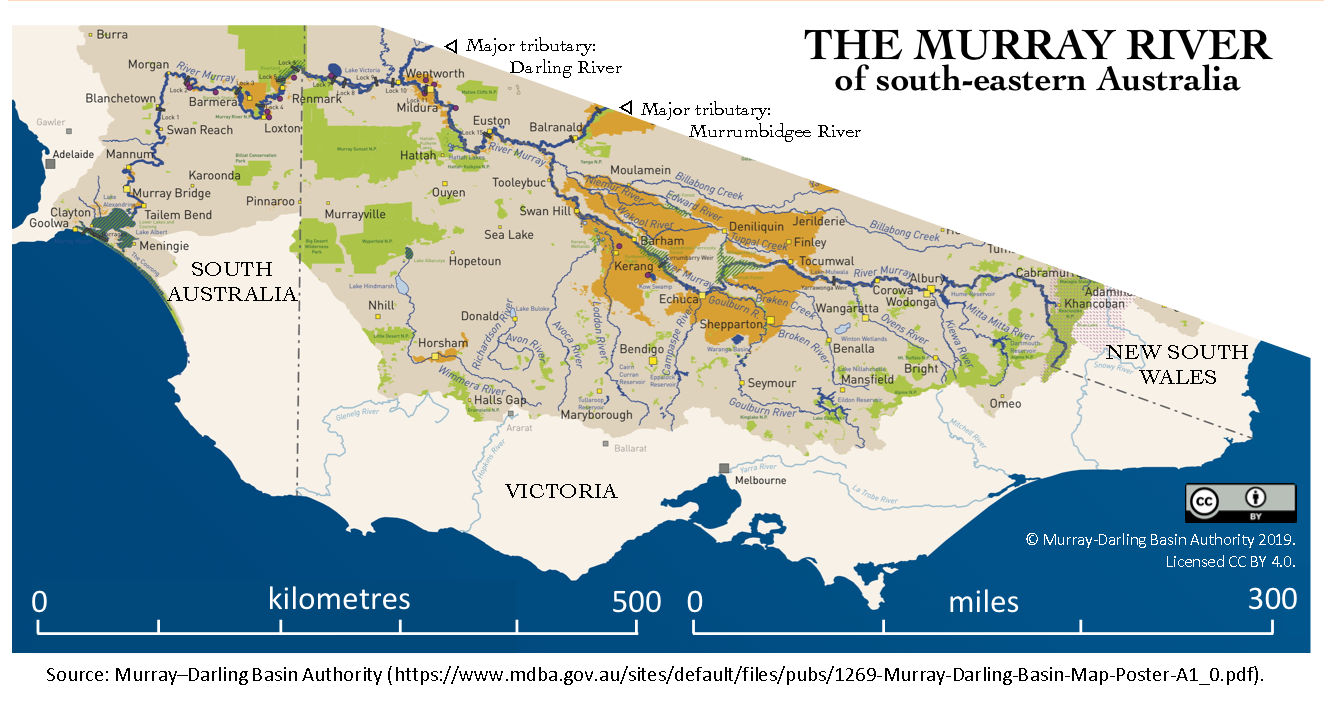
- The course of the Murray River

Location
- Country: Australia
- State: New South Wales, South Australia and Victoria
- Cities: Albury, Wodonga, Echuca, Swan Hill, Mildura, Renmark, Murray Bridge

Physical characteristics
- Source: Cowombat Flat
  - location: Australian Alps, NSW
  - coordinates: 36°47′46″S 148°11′40″E
  - elevation: 1,430 m (4,690 ft)
- Mouth: Murray Mouth
  - location: near Goolwa South
  - coordinates: 35°33′32″S 138°52′48″E
  - elevation: 0 m (0 ft)
- Length: 2,508 km (1,558 mi)
- Basin size: 1,061,469 km^{2} (409,835 mi^{2})
- Discharge
  - location: Murray Mouth
  - average: (Period: 1971–2000)255.5 m^{3}/s (8,060 GL/a)
- Discharge
  - location: Wentworth
  - average: (Period: 1971–2000)377.6 m^{3}/s (11,920 GL/a)
- Discharge
  - location: Euston
  - average: (Period: 1971–2000)441.1 m^{3}/s (13,920 GL/a)
- Discharge
  - location: Albury–Wodonga
  - average: (Period: 1971–2000)137.5 m^{3}/s (4,340 GL/a)

Basin features
- Progression: Lake Alexandrina (Great Australian Bight)
- River system: Murray River
- Tributaries
  - left: Mitta Mitta, Kiewa, Ovens, Goulburn, Campaspe, Loddon
  - right: Swampy Plain, Murrumbidgee, Darling

The Murray River (in South Australia: River Murray; (Note: Historically, South Australian usage (for example, in legislation, newspapers, maps and speech) has been to refer to River Murray rather than Murray River, and similarly with the other significant river in the state, the River Torrens. This word order is not often followed in the other Australian states.) Ngarrindjeri: Millewa, Yorta Yorta: Dhungala or Tongala) is a river in Southeastern Australia. It is Australia's longest river, spanning 2,508 km (1,558 mi). Its tributaries include five of the next six longest rivers of Australia (the Murrumbidgee, Darling, Lachlan, Warrego and Paroo Rivers). Together with that of the Murray, the catchments of these rivers form the Murray–Darling basin, which covers about one-seventh the area of Australia. It is widely considered Australia's most important irrigated region.

The Murray rises in the Australian Alps, draining the western side of Australia's highest mountains, then meanders northwest across Australia's inland plains, forming the border between the states of New South Wales and Victoria as it flows into South Australia. From an east–west direction it turns south at Morgan for its final 315 km (196 mi), reaching the eastern edge of Lake Alexandrina, which fluctuates in salinity. The water then flows through several channels around Hindmarsh Island and Mundoo Island. There it is joined by lagoon water from The Coorong to the south-east before emptying into Encounter Bay (a bay of the Southern Ocean) through the Murray Mouth, 10 km (6.2 mi) east of Goolwa South. Despite discharging considerable volumes of water at times, particularly before the advent of large-scale river regulation, the waters at the Murray Mouth are almost invariably slow and shallow.

As of 2010, the Murray River system received just 58 per cent of its natural flow, though this figure varies considerably.

The border between Victoria and New South Wales (NSW) lies along the top of the southern or left bank of the Murray River. It is not the middle of the river, instead, it is defined by the top of the southern (Victorian) bank. Consequently, up until the point it enters South Australia, the entire Murray River—including the water and the riverbed—falls entirely within New South Wales.

== Geography ==
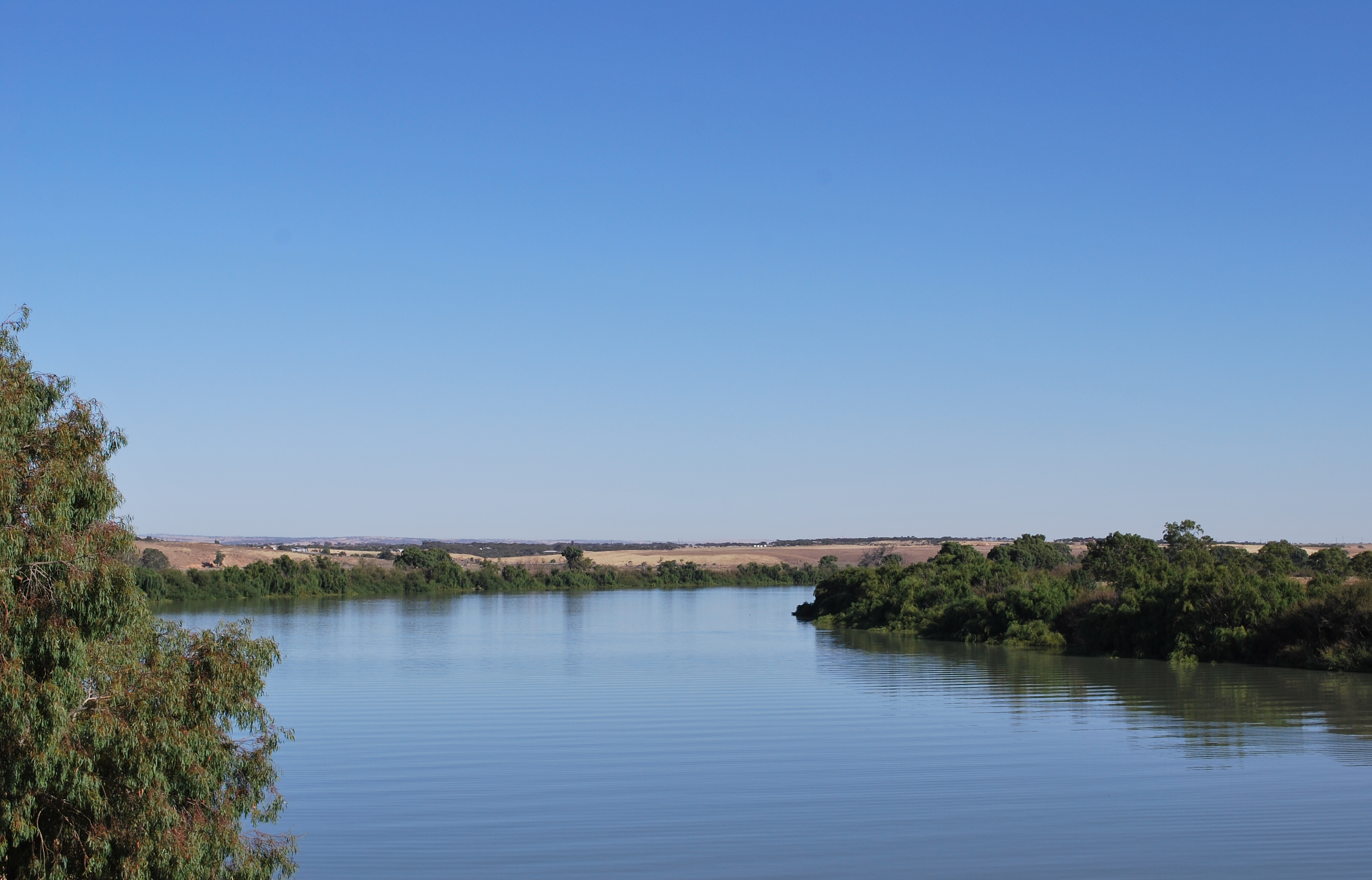
Lower course of the Murray River at Murray Bridge

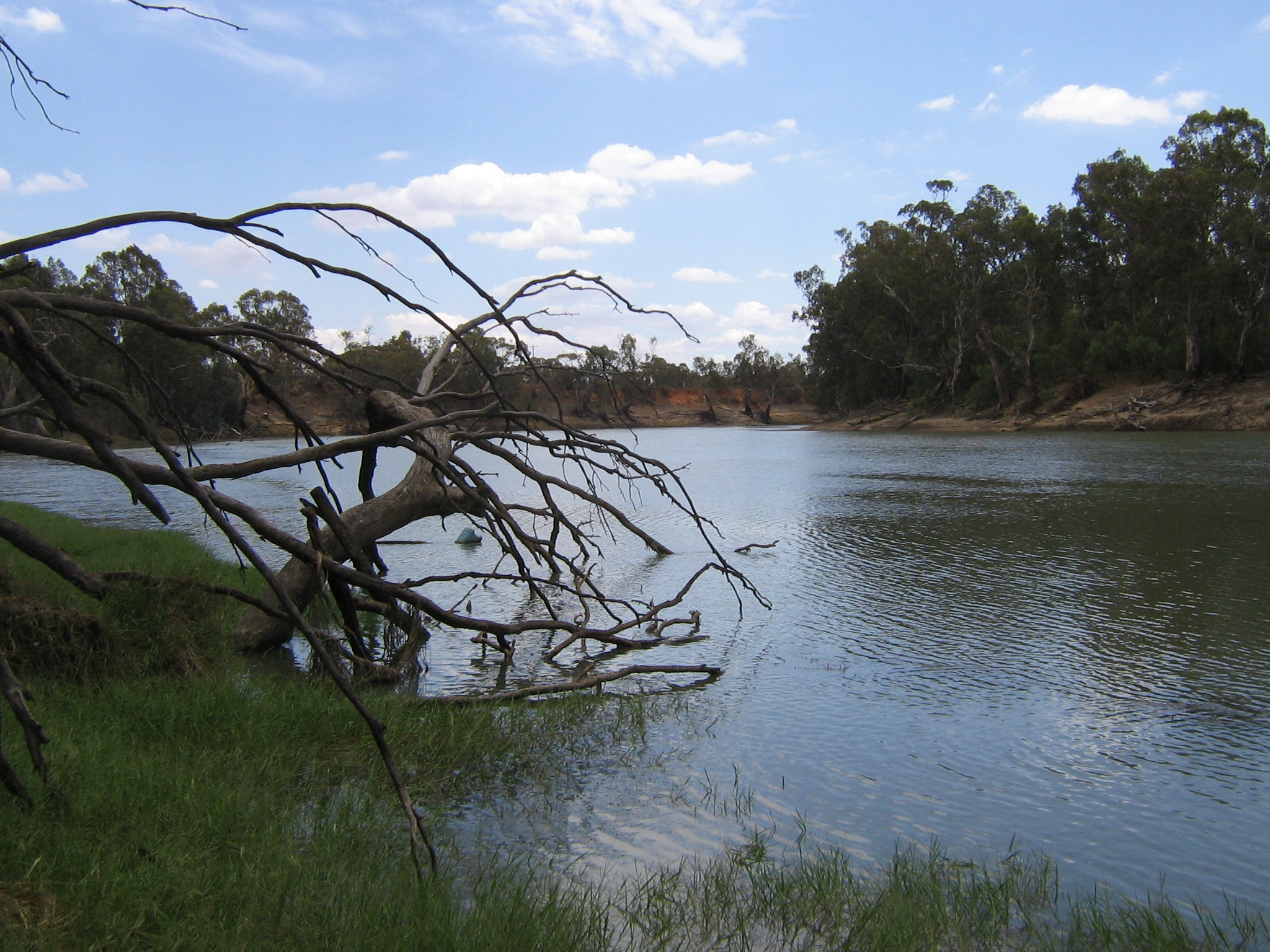
The confluence of the Murray River and Murrumbidgee River near the town of Boundary Bend

The Murray forms part of the 3,750 km (2,330 mi) long combined Murray–Darling river system that drains most of the inland of Victoria, New South Wales and the southern part of Queensland. The Murray carries only a small fraction of the water of comparably sized rivers in other parts of the world, and with great annual variability of its flow. It has dried up completely during extreme droughts on three occasions since official record-keeping began. More often, a sandbar formed at the mouth and stopped the flow.

The Murray is the border between New South Wales and Victoria – specifically at the top of the left bank (i.e. the Victorian side of the river). In a 1980 judgement, the High Court of Australia ruled on the question as to which state had jurisdiction in the unlawful death of a man who was fishing by the river's edge on the Victorian side of the river. This boundary definition can be ambiguous, since the river changes its course over time, and some of the river banks have been modified.

For 11 km (6.8 mi) west of the line of longitude 141°E, (Note: 34°01′19″S 141°00′00″E.) the border is between Victoria and South Australia, in the middle of the river. The discrepancy was caused during the 1840s, when the border was originally surveyed, by an east–west miscalculation of 3.72 kilometres (2.31 miles), and led to a long-running boundary dispute. West of this sector, (Note: 33°58′50″S 140°57′49″E) the Murray is entirely within the state of South Australia.

Centred on the river is the Murray agricultural region, which consists of nine local government areas:

- Albury
- Balranald Shire
- Berrigan Shire
- Edward River Council
- Federation Council
- Greater Hume Shire
- Murray River Council
- Wentworth Shire
- Snowy Valleys Council

=== Major settlements ===
Major settlements along the course of the river, from its source to the Southern Ocean, and their populations from the 2016 Australian census are as follows.

Town	Population	Data source
Albury-Wodonga	89,007	
Yarrawonga–Mulwala	9,810	
Echuca–Moama	18,526	
Swan Hill	10,905	
Mildura and Merbein	35,451	
Renmark–Paringa	9,475	
Berri	4,088	
Loxton	4,568	
Waikerie	1,632	
Mannum	1,632	
Murray Bridge	16,804	

== Tributaries ==
The main tributaries from the mouth:
Left tributary	Right tributary	Length (km)	Basin size (km^{2})	Average discharge (m^{3}/s)^{1}
Murray		2,508	1,061,469	255.5
Lower Murray
	Darling ^{2}	2,844	609,283	38.46
Middle Murray
	Murrumbidgee	1,503	120,393.4	144.89
	Wakool	383	35,158.4	31.4
Loddon		392	19,359.3	11.07
Campaspe		248.1	3,564.6	11.16
Deakin Main Drain			2,222.8	4.85
Goulburn		654	23,916	116.57
Broken Creek		107	3,328	8.34
Tullah Creek			610	0.7
Ovens		191	7,778	62.28
Black Dog Creek		68.5	654	3
Upper Murray
Kiewa		109	1,724	21.85
Mitta Mitta		204	10,062	76
	Bowna Creek		629.7	3.54
Koetong Creek		26.3	175.1	1.18
Burrowye Creek		21.1	204.9	1.31
Cudgewa Creek		53.6	823.1	5.58
	Tooma	73.8	1,875.7	12.45
Corryong Creek		43.4	980.8	6.63
	Swampy Plain	59	871.2	7.05
Buckwong Creek		27.6	208.7	1.1
Darling main tributaries
	Paroo	1,210	60,095	1.53
	Talyawalka Creek	78.9	5,869.9	3.17
Acres Billabong			5,032.5	2.7
Kerrigundi Creek		72.1	1,572.5	0.28
	Warrego	1,380	69,290	5.74
Yanda Creek			4,815.5	0.38
	Dead Horse Creek	32	2,358.9	2.62
Little Bogan		43	713.8	0.56
	Whiskey Creek		721.2	0.54
Barwon		707	243,195.9	145.96
	Culgoa	489	146,317.3	88.52
Barwon main tributaries
Bogan		686	32,196	16.08
	Bokhara	347	9,048.4	5.89
Marra Creek		397	2,786.9	1.84
Macquarie		960	56,307.2	52.26
	The Big Warrambool	226	6,392.8	5.7
	Sparkes Warrambool	93.5	1,818.7	1.87
Naomi		708	39,118.4	43.66
Two Mile Warrambool			5,609.3	4.76
Mehi		320	5,995.7	5.12
Gwydir		488	26,588	23.88
	Mooni	542	15,905.2	3.36
Boomi		231	9,223.6	8.51
	Macintyre	319	25,275.2	28.89
Weir		482	12,729	9.28
Culgoa main tributaries
	Lednapper Creek	45.9	5,877.8	1
	Birrie	197	3,642.5	2.41
	Bow Creek	53	3,943.4	1.63
	Burbar Creek		35,156.5	5.88
	Maranoa	519	20,039	3.09
	Yuleba Creek	158	1,653.5	0.45
	Dogwood Creek	211	6,615.1	1.43
Condamine		709	29,861.9	38.43
Endorheic Basin
Wimmera		278	7,043.7	11.67
Notes: ^{1} Period: 1971–2000;^{2} Darling–Barwon–Macintyre;

== River life ==
The Murray and its tributaries support a variety of river life adapted to its vagaries. This includes native fish such as the famous Murray cod, trout cod, golden perch, Macquarie perch, silver perch, eel-tailed catfish, Australian smelt and western carp gudgeon, as well as other aquatic species such as the Murray short-necked turtle, broad-clawed yabbies and the large-clawed Macrobrachium shrimp 67, in addition to aquatic species more widely distributed through Southeastern Australia such as common long-necked turtles, common yabbies, the small claw-less paratya shrimp, water rats and platypus. The Murray crayfish, an endangered species, was able to increase its numbers thanks to scientists. The Murray also supports fringeing corridors and forests of the river red gum.

The health of the Murray has declined significantly since European settlement, particularly through regulation of its flows. Extreme droughts between 2000 and 2007 put significant stress on river red gum forests, leading to mounting concern over their long-term survival. The Murray has also flooded on occasion. The most significant was the flood of 1956: lasting for up to six months, it inundated many towns on its lower reaches in South Australia.

== Ancient history ==
=== Lake Bungunnia ===
Between 2.5 and 0.5 million years ago, the Murray terminated in a vast freshwater lake – Lake Bungunnia – formed by earth movements that blocked the river near Swan Reach. At its maximum extent, Lake Bungunnia covered 33,000 km^{2} (12,741 sq mi), extending to near the Menindee Lakes in the north and to near Boundary Bend in the south. The draining of Lake Bungunnia occurred approximately 600,000 years ago.

Deep clays deposited by the lake are evident in cliffs around Chowilla in South Australia. Considerably higher rainfall would have been required to keep such a lake full; the draining of Lake Bungunnia appears to have marked the end of a wet phase in the history of the Murray–Darling Basin and the onset of widespread arid conditions similar to today. A species of Neoceratodus lungfish existed in Lake Bungunnia; today Neoceratodus lungfish are only found in several Queensland rivers.

=== Cadell Fault and formation of the Barmah red gum forests ===
The noted Barmah River red gum forests owe their existence to the Cadell Fault. About 25,000 years ago, displacement occurred along this fault, raising its eastern edge, which runs north–south, 8 to 12 m (26 to 39 ft) above the floodplain. This created a complex series of events. A section of the original Murray River channel immediately behind the fault was rendered abandoned (it exists today as an empty channel known as Green Gully). The Goulburn River was dammed by the southern end of the fault to create a natural lake.

The Murray River flowed to the north around the Cadell Fault, creating the channel of the Edward River which exists today and through which much of the Murray's waters still flow. Then the natural dam on the Goulburn River failed, the lake drained, and the Murray changed its course to the south and started to flow through the smaller Goulburn River channel, creating "The Barmah Choke" and "The Narrows" (where the river channel is unusually narrow), before entering into the proper Murray River channel again.

The primary result of the Cadell Fault – that the west-flowing water of the Murray River strikes the north–south fault and diverts both north and south around the fault in the two main channels (Edward and ancestral Goulburn) in addition to a fan of small streams, and regularly floods a large amount of low-lying country in the area. These conditions are perfect for river red gums, which rapidly formed forests in the area. Thus the displacement of the Cadell Fault 25,000 BP led directly to the formation of the famous Barmah river red gum forests.

The Barmah Choke and The Narrows restrict the amount of water that can travel down this part of the Murray. In times of flood and high irrigation flows the majority of the water, in addition to flooding the red gum forests, actually travels through the Edward River channel. The Murray has not had enough flow power to naturally enlarge The Barmah Choke and The Narrows to increase the amount of water they can carry.

The Cadell Fault is quite noticeable as a continuous, low, earthen embankment as one drives into Barmah from the west, although to the untrained eye it may appear man-made.

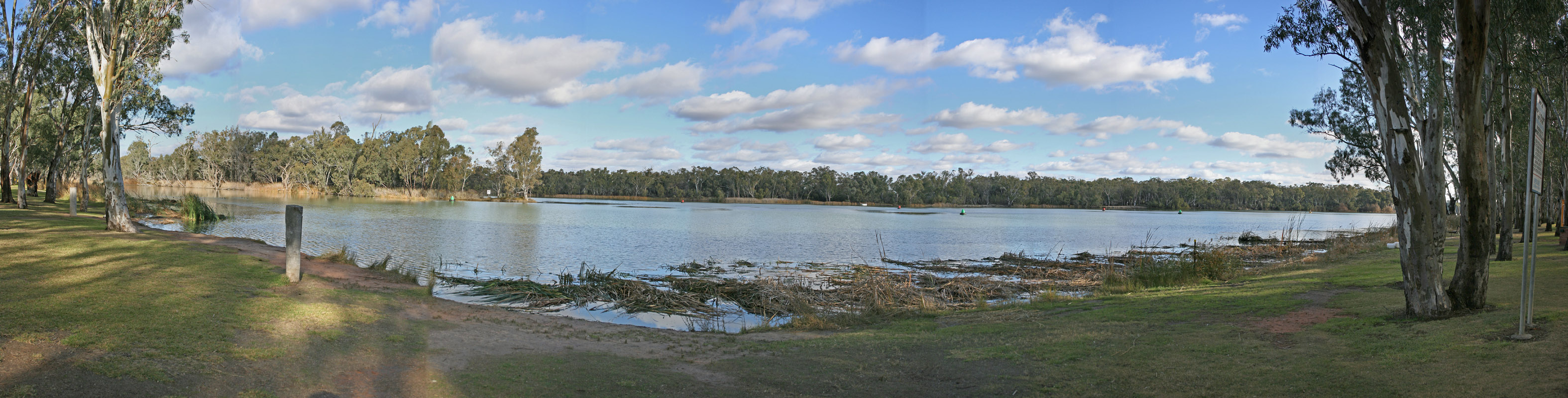
The confluence of the Darling and Murray Rivers at Wentworth, New South Wales

== Murray mouth ==
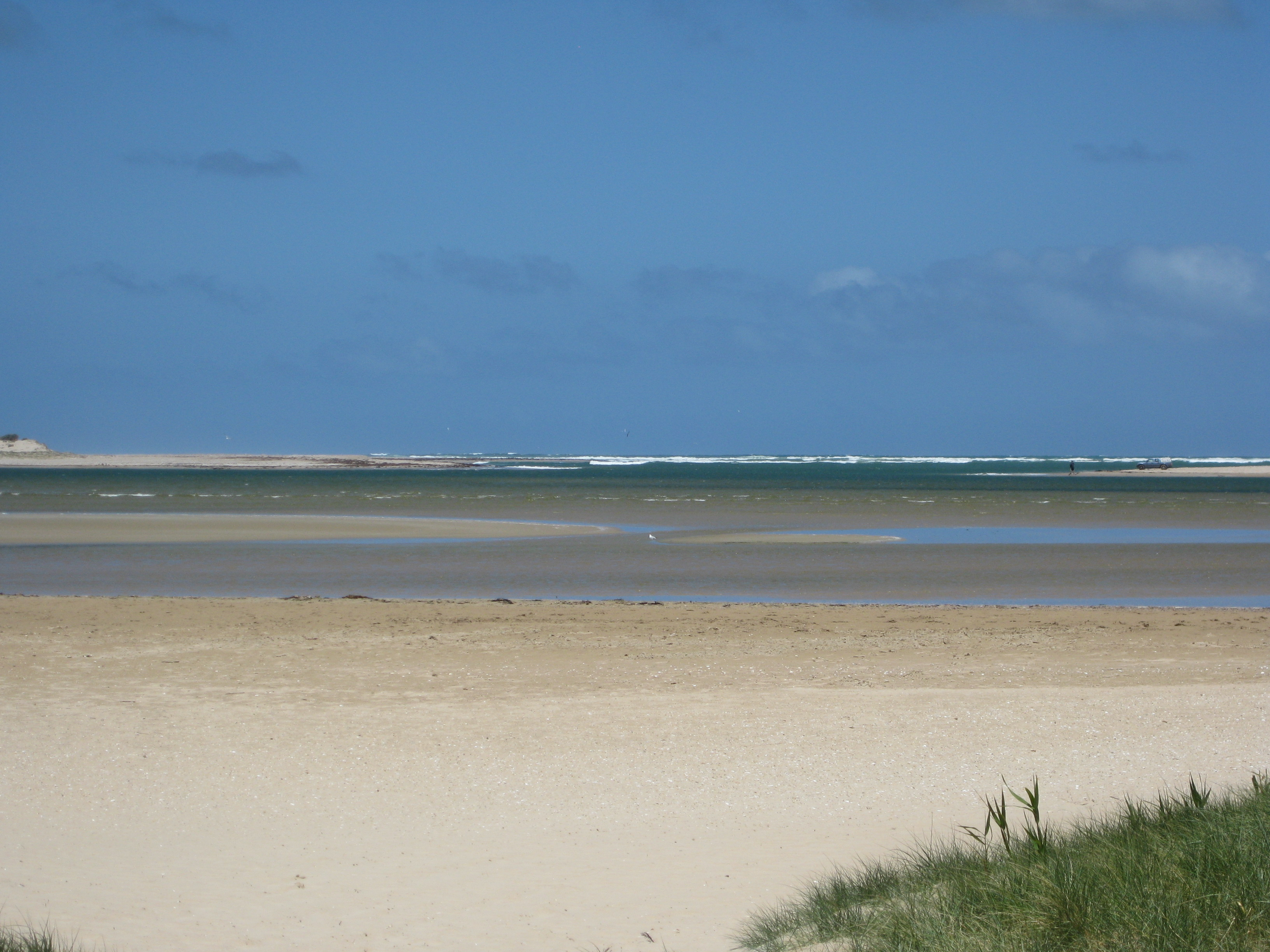
Murray Mouth viewed from Hindmarsh Island

The Murray Mouth is the point at which the Murray River empties into the sea, and the interaction between its shallow, shifting and variable currents and the open sea can be complex and unpredictable. During the peak period of Murray River commerce (roughly 1855 to 1920), it presented a major impediment to the passage of goods and produce between Adelaide and the Murray settlements, and many vessels foundered or were wrecked there.

Since the early 2000s, dredging machines have operated at the Murray Mouth for 24 hours a day, moving sand from the channel to maintain a minimal flow from the sea and into the Coorong's lagoon system. Without the dredging, the mouth would silt up and close, cutting the supply of fresh sea-water into the Coorong National Park, which would then warm up, stagnate and die.

== Mythology ==
Being one of the major river systems on one of the driest continents on Earth, the Murray has significant cultural relevance to Aboriginal Australians. According to the people of Lake Alexandrina, the Murray was created by the tracks of the Great Ancestor, Ngurunderi, as he pursued Pondi, the Murray cod. The chase originated in the interior of New South Wales. Ngurunderi pursued the fish (who, like many totem animals in Aboriginal myths, is often portrayed as a man) on rafts (or lala) made from red gums and continually launched spears at his target. But Pondi was a wily prey and carved a weaving path, carving out the river's various tributaries. Ngurunderi was forced to beach his rafts, and often create new ones as he changed from reach to reach of the river.

At Kobathatang, Ngurunderi finally got lucky and struck Pondi in the tail with a spear. However, the shock to the fish was so great it launched him forward in a straight line to a place called Peindjalang, near Tailem Bend. Eager to rectify his failure to catch his prey, the hunter and his two wives (sometimes the escaped sibling wives of Waku and Kanu) hurried on, and took positions high on the cliff on which Tailem Bend now stands. They sprung an ambush on Pondi only to fail again. Ngurunderi set off in pursuit again but lost his prey as Pondi dived into Lake Alexandrina. Ngurunderi and the women settled on the shore, only to suffer bad luck with fishing, being plagued by a water fiend known as Muldjewangk. They later moved to a more suitable spot at the site of present-day Ashville. The twin summits of Mount Misery are said to be the remnants of his rafts; they are known as Lalangengall or the two watercraft.

This story of a hunter pursuing a Murray cod that carved out the Murray persists in numerous forms in various language groups that inhabit the enormous area spanned by the Murray system. The Wotojobaluk people of Victoria tell of Totyerguil from the area now known as Swan Hill, who ran out of spears while chasing Otchtout the cod.

== History ==
Roonka Flat, near Blanchetown, was a site of occupation since at least 7000BC.

=== European exploration ===
The first Europeans to encounter the river were Hamilton Hume and William Hovell, who crossed the river where Albury now stands in 1824: Hume named it the Hume River after his father. In 1830, Captain Charles Sturt reached the river after travelling down its tributary the Murrumbidgee River and named it the Murray River in honour of the then British Secretary of State for War and the Colonies, Sir George Murray, not realising it was the same river that Hume and Hovell had encountered further upstream.

Sturt continued down the remaining length of the Murray to finally reach Lake Alexandrina and the river's mouth. The vicinity of the Murray Mouth was explored more thoroughly by Captain Collet Barker in 1831.

The first three settlers on the Murray River are known to have been James Collins Hawker (explorer and surveyor) along with Edward John Eyre (explorer and later Governor of Jamaica) plus E.B. Scott (onetime superintendent of Yatala Labour Prison). Hawker is known to have sold his share in the Bungaree Station, which he founded with his brothers, and relocated alongside the Murray at a site near Moorundie.

In 1852, Francis Cadell, in preparation for the launch of his steamer service, explored the river in a canvas boat, travelling 1,300 miles (2,100 km) downstream from Swan Hill.

In 1858, while acting as Minister of Land and Works for New South Wales, Irish nationalist and founder of Young Ireland, Charles Gavan Duffy, founded Carlyle Township on the Murray River, after his close friend, Scottish historian and essayist Thomas Carlyle. Included in the township were "Jane Street", named in honour of Carlyle's wife Jane Carlyle and "Stuart-Mill Street" in honour of political philosopher John Stuart Mill

In 1858, the Government Zoologist, William Blandowski, together with Gerard Krefft, explored the lower reaches of the Murray and Darling rivers, compiling a list of birds and mammals.

George "Chinese" Morrison, then aged 18, navigated the river by canoe from Wodonga to its mouth, in 65 days, completing the 1,555-mile (2,503 km) journey in January 1881.

== River transport ==
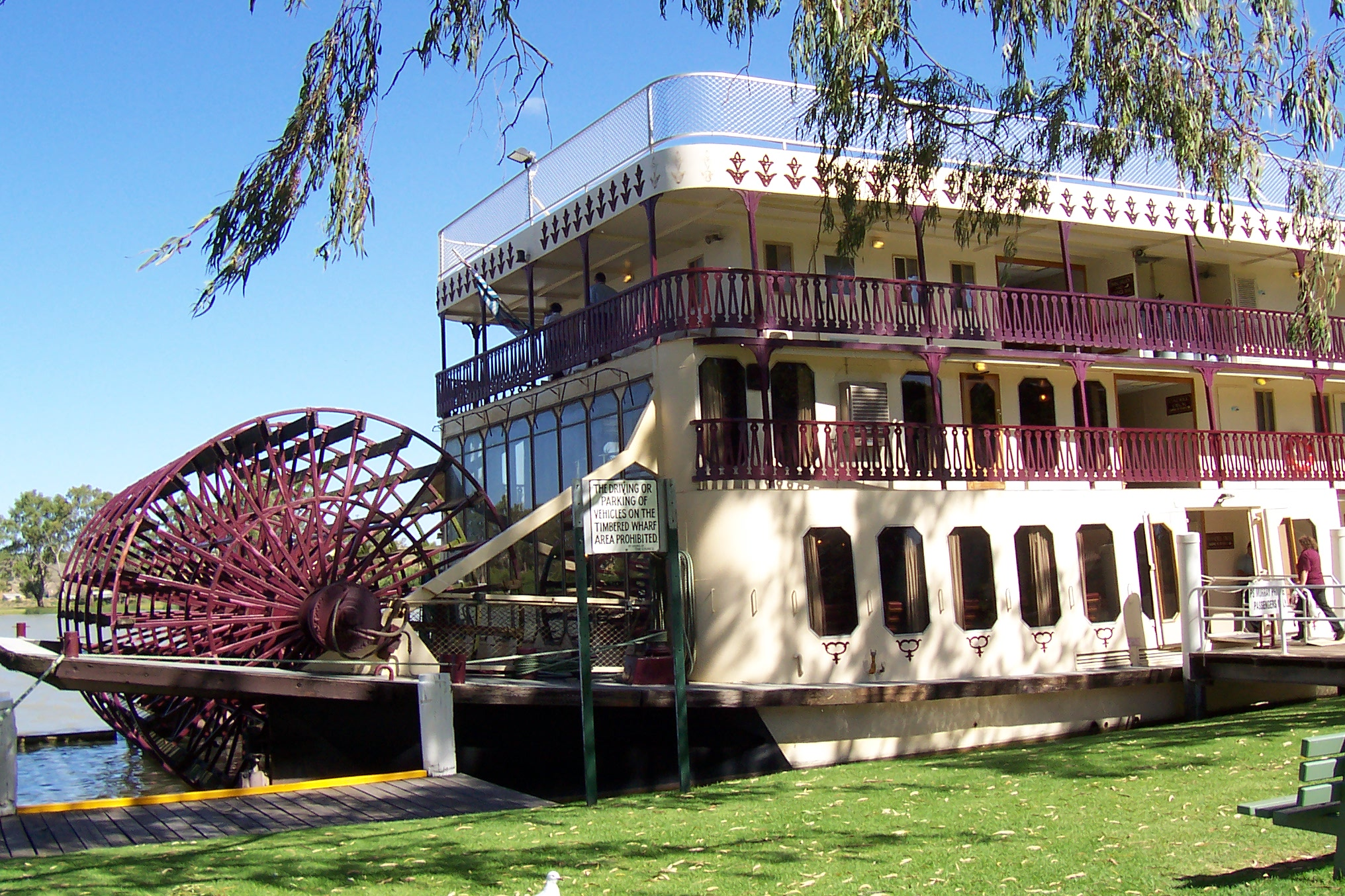
The PS Murray Princess is the largest paddlewheeler operating on the Murray River.

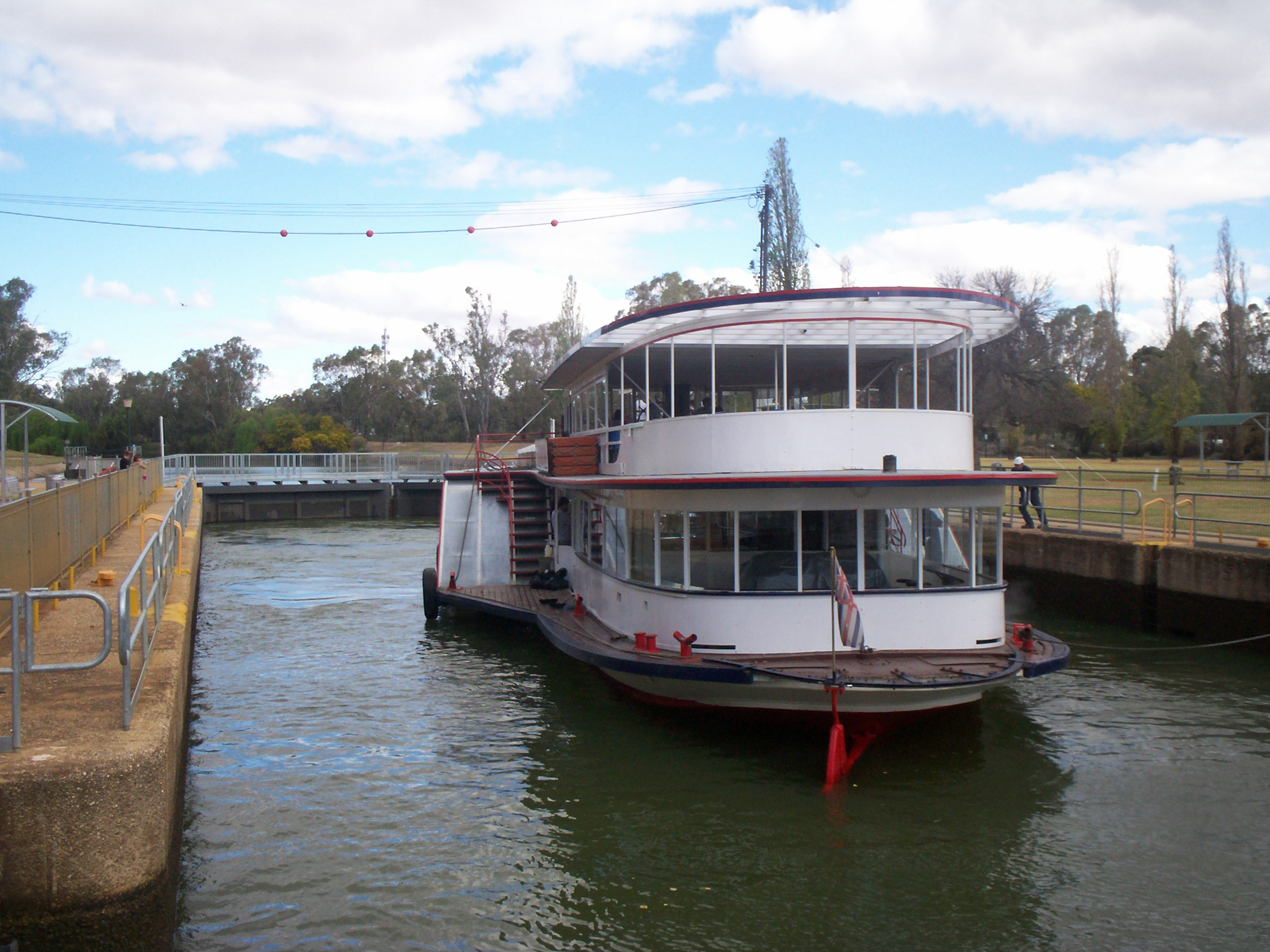
The PS Melbourne passing through Lock 11 at Mildura

Shipping cannot enter the Murray from the sea because it does not have an estuary. However, in the 19th century the river supported a substantial commercial trade using shallow-draft paddle steamers, the first trips being made by two boats from South Australia on the spring flood of 1853. The Lady Augusta, captained by Francis Cadell, reached Swan Hill while another, Mary Ann, captained by William Randell, reached Moama (near Echuca). In 1855 a steamer carrying gold-mining supplies reached Albury but Echuca was the usual turn-around point, though small boats continued to link with up-river ports such as Tocumwal, Wahgunyah and Albury.

The arrival of steamboat transport was welcomed by pastoralists who had been suffering from a shortage of transport due to the demands of the gold fields. By 1860 a dozen steamers were operating in the high water season along the Murray and its tributaries. Once the railway reached Echuca in 1864, the bulk of the woolclip from the Riverina was transported via river to Echuca and then south to Melbourne.

The steam paddleship Etona was launched as a mission steamer, replacing an earlier steam launch, also named Etona, which had been operating on the Murray since 1891. The vessel was based at Murray Bridge, and operated between Goolwa and the Victorian border, stopping at towns such as Mannum, Morgan and Renmark as well as isolated settlements and workcamps. The forepart of the vessel was used as a chapel fitted with an altar and organ, with a capacity of 20 people. There was also a cabin. The minister on board, Rev. William Bussell, doubled as captain. On 16 August 1898, Etona arrived at Renmark, where the Bishop of Adelaide, Rev. Dr. John Harmer, held services the following Sunday with the assistance of Rev H M Wylie. In September of the same year, the service due in Holder on the 18th was suspended due to the vessel grounding on a sandbank. During its year of launch, the boiler of Etona gave way, being replaced at a cost of £87.

The Murray was plagued by "snags", fallen trees submerged in the water, and considerable efforts were made to clear the river of these threats to shipping by using barges equipped with steam-driven winches. In recent times, efforts have been made to restore many of these snags by placing dead gum trees back into the river. The primary purpose of this is to provide habitat for fish species whose breeding grounds and shelter were eradicated by the removal of the snags.

Author E.J. Brady chronicled an eventful journey downriver in a small motor boat from Albury to the coast in 1911 in River Rovers.

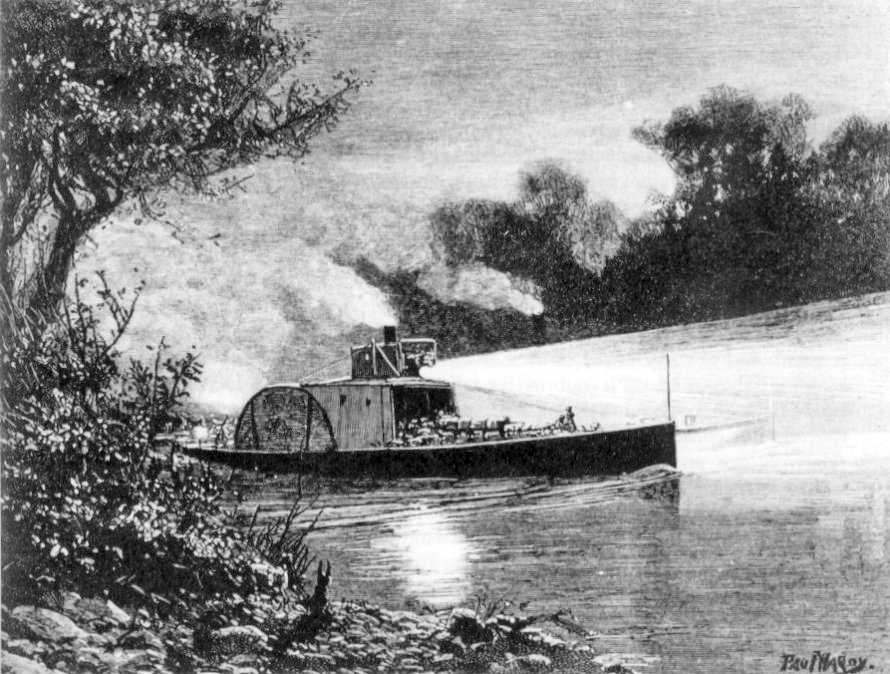
A paddle steamer passing another on the Murray at night, about 1880

The volume and value of river trade made Echuca Victoria's second port and in the decade from 1874 it underwent considerable expansion. By this time up to thirty steamers and a similar number of barges were working the river in season. River transport began to decline once the railways touched the Murray at numerous points. The unreliable levels made it impossible for boats to compete with the rail and later road transport. However, the river still carries pleasure boats along its entire length.

Today, most traffic on the river is recreational. Small private boats are used for water skiing and fishing. Houseboats are common, both commercial for hire and privately owned. There are a number of both historic paddle steamers and newer boats offering cruises ranging from half an hour to five days.

=== River crossings ===
The Murray River has been a significant barrier to land-based travel and trade. Many of the ports for transport of goods along the Murray have also developed as places to cross the river, either by bridge or ferry. The first bridge to cross the Murray, which was built in 1869, is in the town of Murray Bridge, formerly called Edwards Crossing. To distinguish this bridge from the many others that span the Murray River, this bridge is known as Murray River road bridge, Murray Bridge Tolls applied on South Australian ferries until abolished in November 1961.

== Water storage and irrigation ==
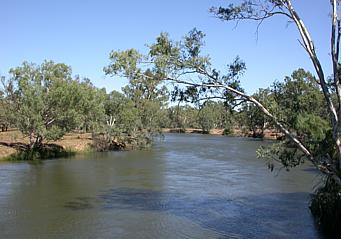
A branch of the Murray in its middle reaches, near Howlong

Small-scale pumping plants began drawing water from the Murray in the 1850s and the first high-volume plant was constructed at Mildura in 1887. The introduction of pumping stations along the river promoted an expansion of farming and led ultimately to the development of irrigation areas (including the Murrumbidgee Irrigation Area).

In 1915, the three Murray states – New South Wales, Victoria, and South Australia – signed the River Murray Agreement which proposed the construction of storage reservoirs in the river's headwaters as well as at Lake Victoria near the South Australian border. Along the intervening stretch of the river a series of locks and weirs were built. These were originally proposed to support navigation even in times of low water, but riverborne transport was already declining due to improved highway and railway systems.

The disruption of the river's natural flow, run-off from agriculture, and the introduction of pest species such as the European carp has led to serious environmental damage along the river's length. There are widespread concerns that the river will be unusably salty in the medium to long term – a serious problem given that the Murray supplies 40 per cent of the water supply for Adelaide. Efforts to alleviate the problems have proceeded but disagreement between various groups has hampered progress.

Introduced fish species such as carp, gambusia, weather loach, redfin perch, brown trout, and rainbow trout have also had serious negative effects on native fish. The most pernicious are carp, which have contributed to environmental degradation of the Murray and its tributaries by destroying aquatic plants and permanently raising turbidity. Carp is the most common species, and can be found in all segments of the river.

=== Reservoirs ===
Four large reservoirs were built along the Murray. In addition to Lake Victoria (completed late 1920s), these are Lake Hume near Albury-Wodonga (completed 1936), Lake Mulwala at Yarrawonga (completed 1939), and Lake Dartmouth, which is actually on the Mitta Mitta River upstream of Lake Hume (completed 1979). The Murray also receives water from the complex dam and pipeline system of the Snowy Mountains Scheme. An additional reservoir was proposed in the 1960s at Chowilla Dam, which was to have been built in South Australia and would have flooded land mostly in Victoria and New South Wales. It was cancelled in favour of building Dartmouth Dam due to costs and concerns relating to increased salinity.

=== Barrages ===
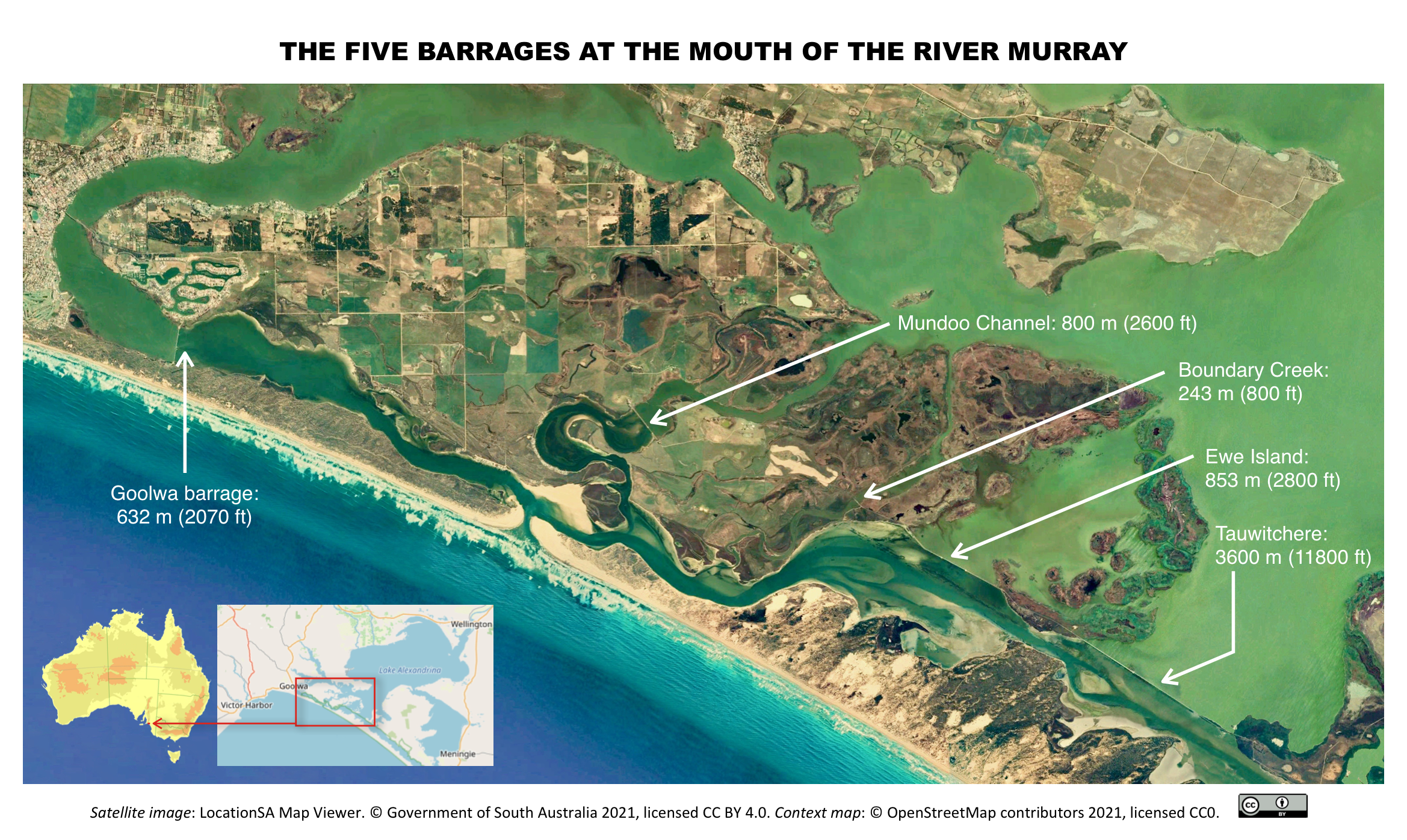
Locations of the barrages at the mouth of the Murray

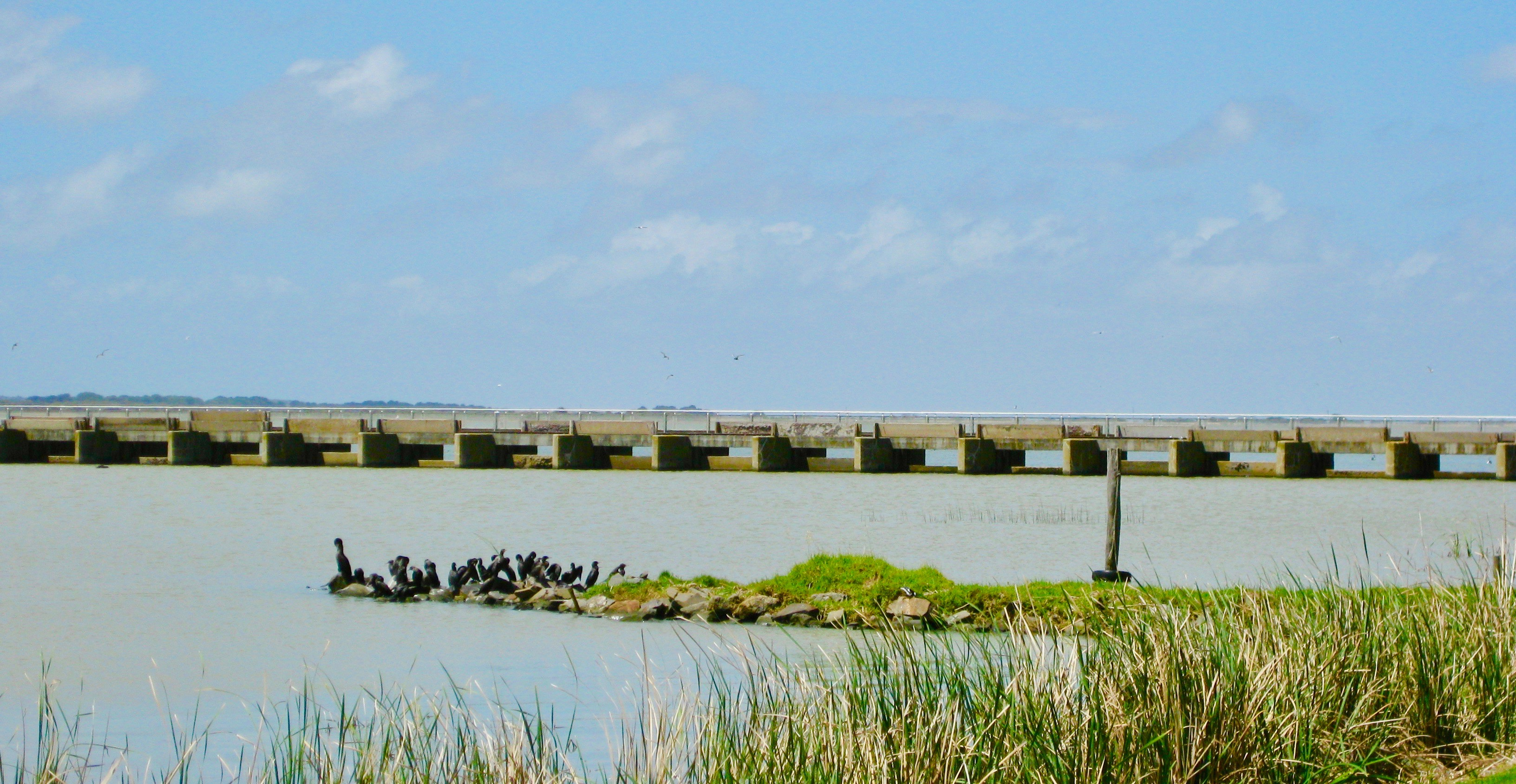
Goolwa Barrage viewed from the freshwater side

From 1935 to 1940 a series of barrages was built near the Murray Mouth to stop seawater entering the lower part of the river during low flow periods. They are the Goolwa Barrage, with a length of 632 metres (2,073 ft); Mundoo Channel Barragel 800 metres (2,600 ft); Boundary Creek Barragel 243 metres (797 ft); Ewe Island Barrage, 853 metres (2,799 ft); and Tauwitchere Barrage, 3.6 kilometres (2.2 mi).

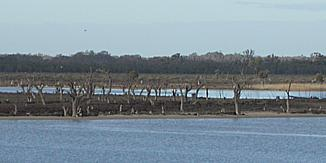
Dead and dying river red gums on the lower Murray near Berri, South Australia

These dams inverted the patterns of the river's natural flow from the original winter-spring flood and summer-autumn dry to the present low level through winter and higher during summer. These changes ensured the availability of water for irrigation and made the Murray Valley Australia's most productive agricultural region, but have seriously disrupted the life cycles of many ecosystems both inside and outside the river, and the irrigation has led to dryland salinity that now threatens the agricultural industries.

In 2006, the Government of South Australia released a plan to investigate the construction of controversial Wellington Weir.

=== Locks ===
Lock 1 was completed near Blanchetown in 1922. Torrumbarry weir downstream of Echuca began operating in December 1923. Of the several locks that were proposed, only thirteen were completed; Locks 1 to 11 on the stretch downstream of Mildura, Lock 15 at Euston and Lock 26 at Torrumbarry. Construction of the remaining weirs purely for navigation purposes was abandoned in 1934. The last lock to be completed was Lock 15, in 1937. Lock 11, just downstream of Mildura, creates a 100-kilometre (62 mi) long lock pool that aided irrigation pumping from Mildura and Red Cliffs.

Each lock has a navigable passage next to it through the weir, which is opened during periods of high river flow, when there is too much water for the lock. The weirs can be completely removed, and the locks completely covered by water during flood conditions. Lock 11 is unique in that the lock was built inside a bend of the river, with the weir in the bend itself. A channel was dug to the lock, creating an island between it and the weir. The weir is also of a different design, being dragged out of the river during high flow, rather than lifted out.

Lock distances and elevations
Name	No.	River distance*	Elevation**	Com- pleted
Blanchetown	1	274 km (170 mi)	3.3 m (10.8 ft)	1922
Waikerie	2	362 km (225 mi)	6.1 m (20.0 ft)	1928
Overland Corner	3	431 km (268 mi)	9.8 m (32.2 ft)	1925
Bookpurnong	4	516 km (321 mi)	13.2 m (43.3 ft)	1929
Renmark	5	562 km (349 mi)	16.3 m (53.5 ft)	1927
Murtho	6	620 km (385 mi)	19.2 m (63.0 ft)	1930
Rufus River	7	697 km (433 mi)	22.1 m (72.5 ft)	1934
Wangumma	8	726 km (451 mi)	24.6 m (80.7 ft)	1935
Kulnine	9	765 km (475 mi)	27.4 m (89.9 ft)	1926
Wentworth	10	825 km (513 mi)	30.8 m (101 ft)	1929
Mildura	11	878 km (546 mi)	34.4 m (113 ft)	1927
Euston	15	1110 km (690 mi)	47.6 m (156 ft)	1937
Torrumbarry	26	1638 km (1020 mi)	86.05 m (280 ft)	1924
Yarrawonga Weir	n/a	1992 km (1238 mi)	124.9 m (410 ft)	1939
* Distance is from the Murray Mouth. ** Elevation is above sea level, at full supply level (i.e., maximum capacity).

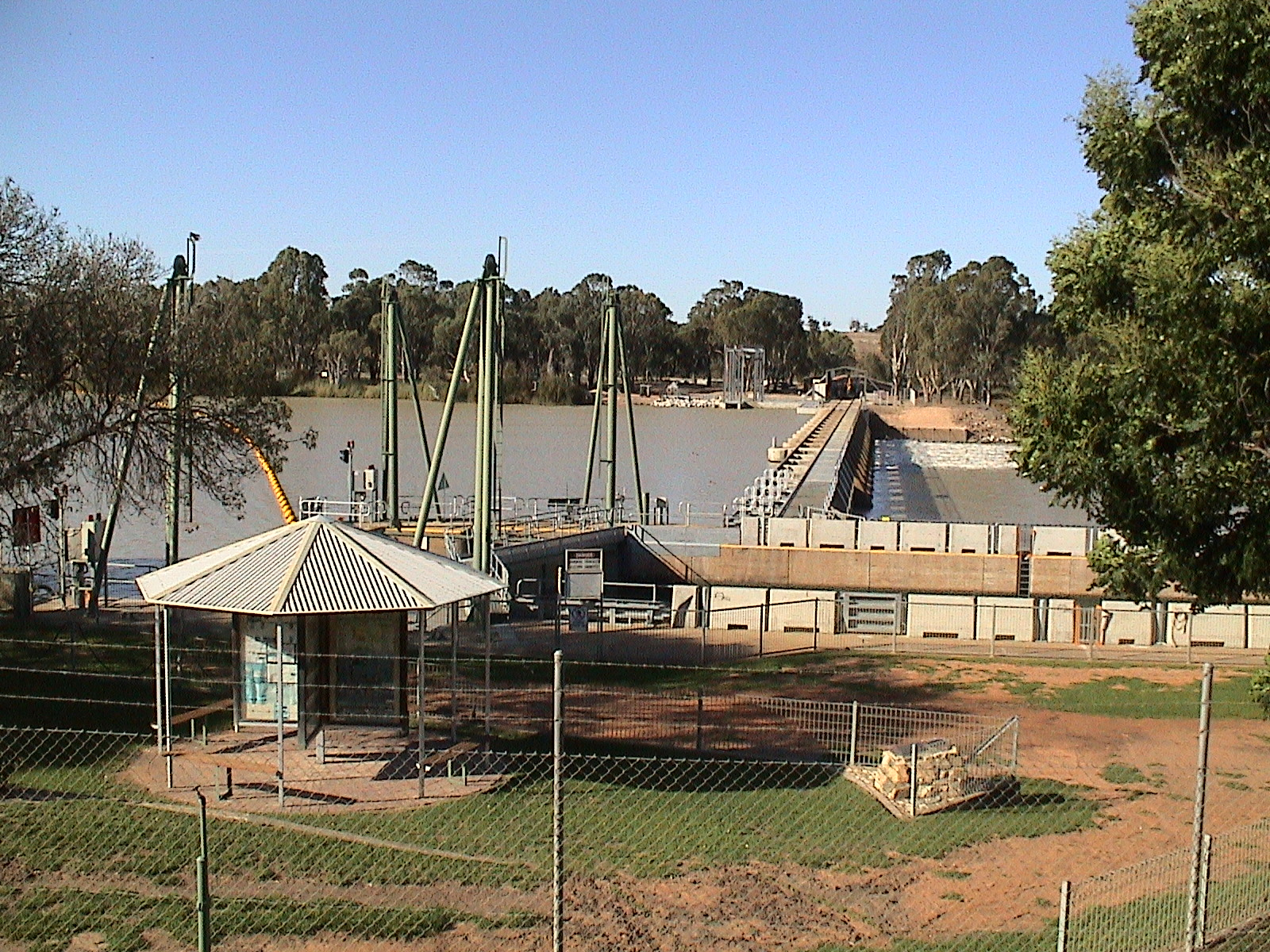

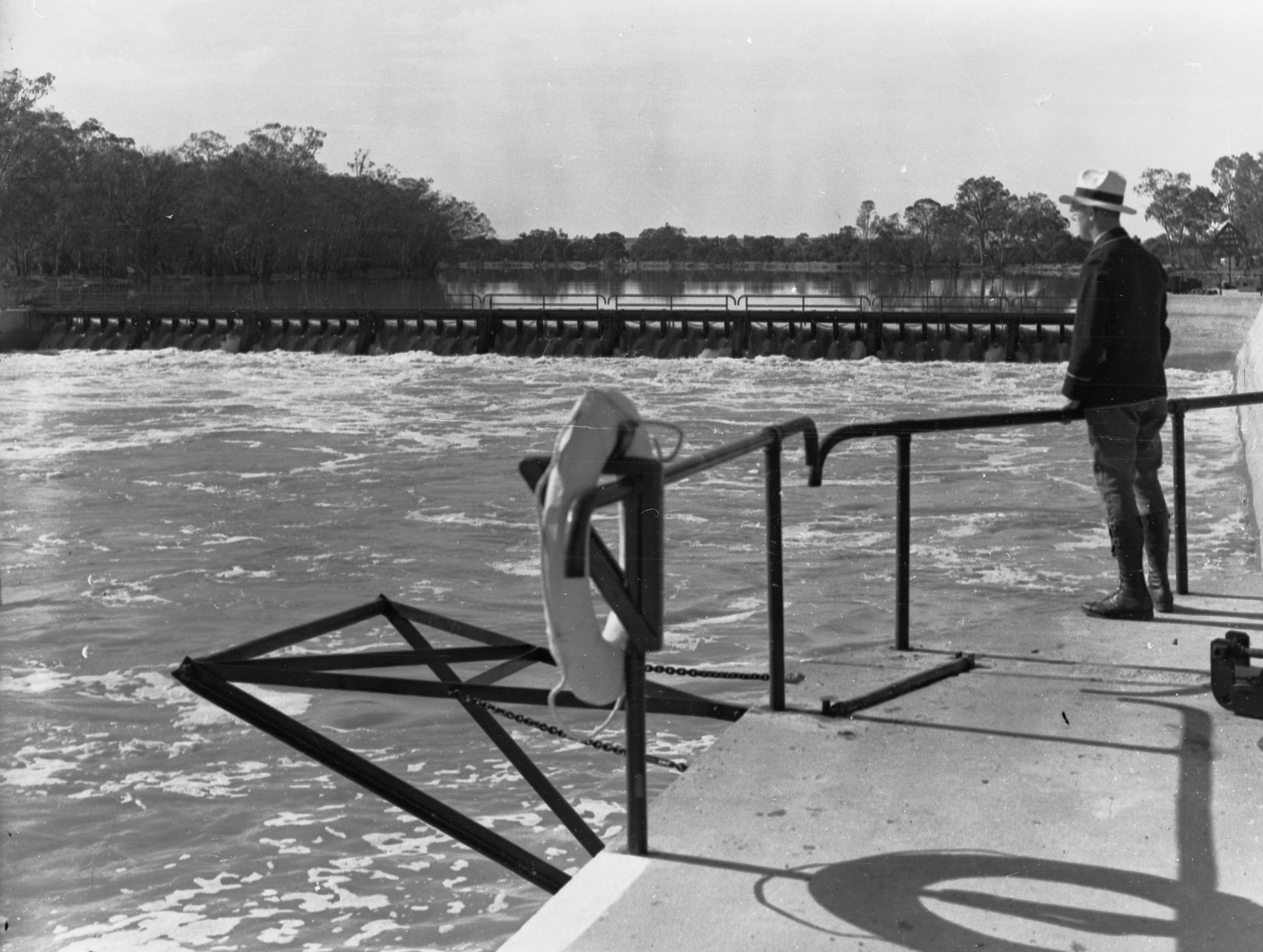

Lock 1 and weir at Blanchetown

Lock 5 at Renmark, about 1935

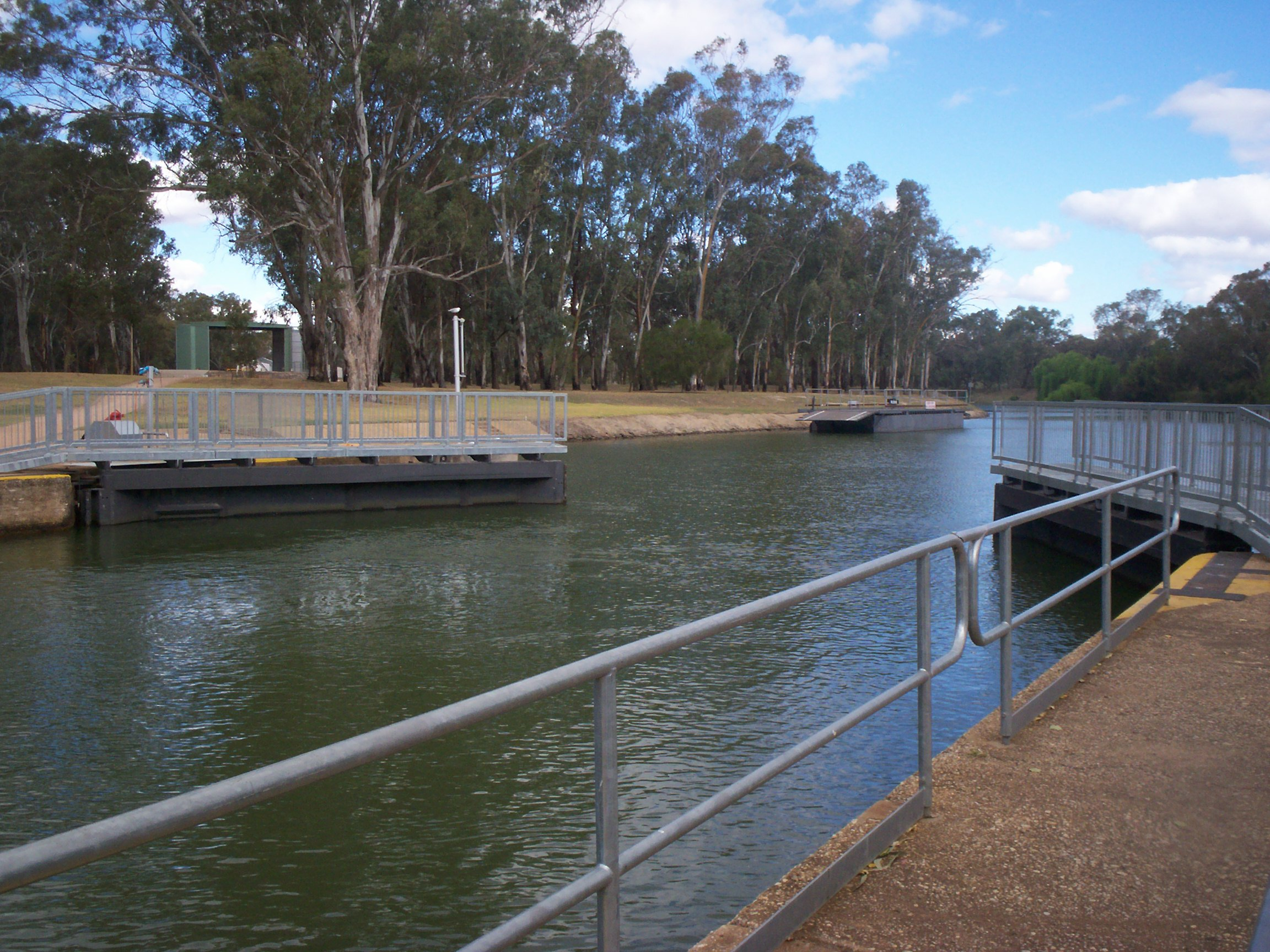

Lock 11, Mildura

== See also ==
- River Murray International Dark Sky Reserve

Major tributaries

- Darling River
- Murrumbidgee River
- Goulburn River
- Mitta Mitta River
- Ovens River
- Campaspe River
- Kiewa River
- Lachlan River

Population centres

- Albury-Wodonga
- Echuca
- Swan Hill
- Mildura
- Renmark
- Murray Bridge
- Goolwa South
