= Mulwala =

Mulwala New South Wales
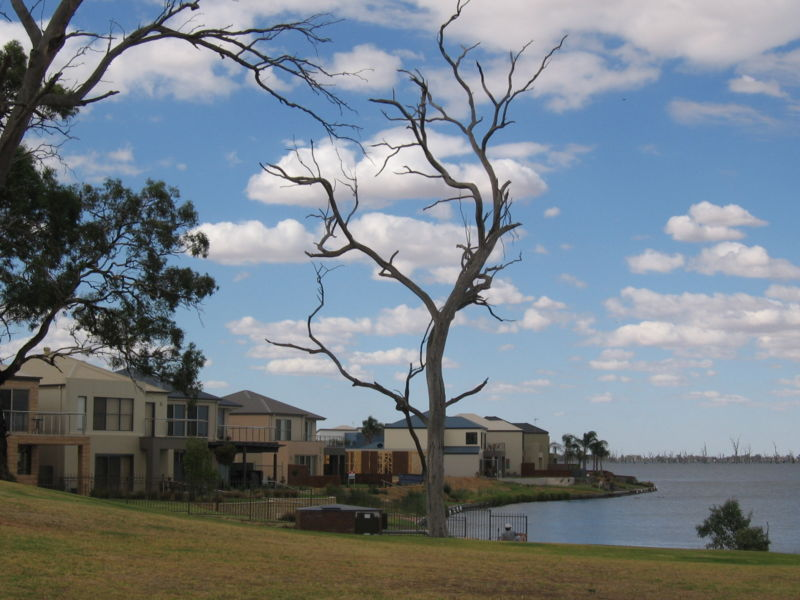
- New residential development on the shore of Lake Mulwala.

- Coordinates: 35°58′55″S 146°00′04″E
- Population: 2,557 (2021 census)
- Established: 1858
- Postcode(s): 2647
- Location: 650 km (404 mi) SW of Sydney; 286 km (178 mi) NE of Melbourne; 97 km (60 mi) W of Albury; 4 km (2 mi) N of Yarrawonga; 436 km (271 mi) SW of Canberra
- LGA(s): Federation Council
- County: Denison
- State electorate(s): Albury
- Federal division(s): Farrer

Mulwala (locally /mʌlˈweɪlə/ mul-WAY-lə, elsewhere also /mʌlˈwɑːlə/ mul-WAH-lə) is a town in the Federation Council local government area in the Riverina district of New South Wales, Australia. Situated on Lake Mulwala, an artificial lake formed by the damming of the Murray River, it forms a "twin town" with the larger town of Yarrawonga across the border in Victoria. At the 2021 census, Mulwala had a population of 2,557 people. The town's name is derived from an aboriginal word for 'rain'.

Mulwala is a popular destination for water sports and fishing, especially for tourists from nearby Melbourne, 300 kilometres (190 mi) to the south. Other popular attractions include three major licensed clubs.

== History ==
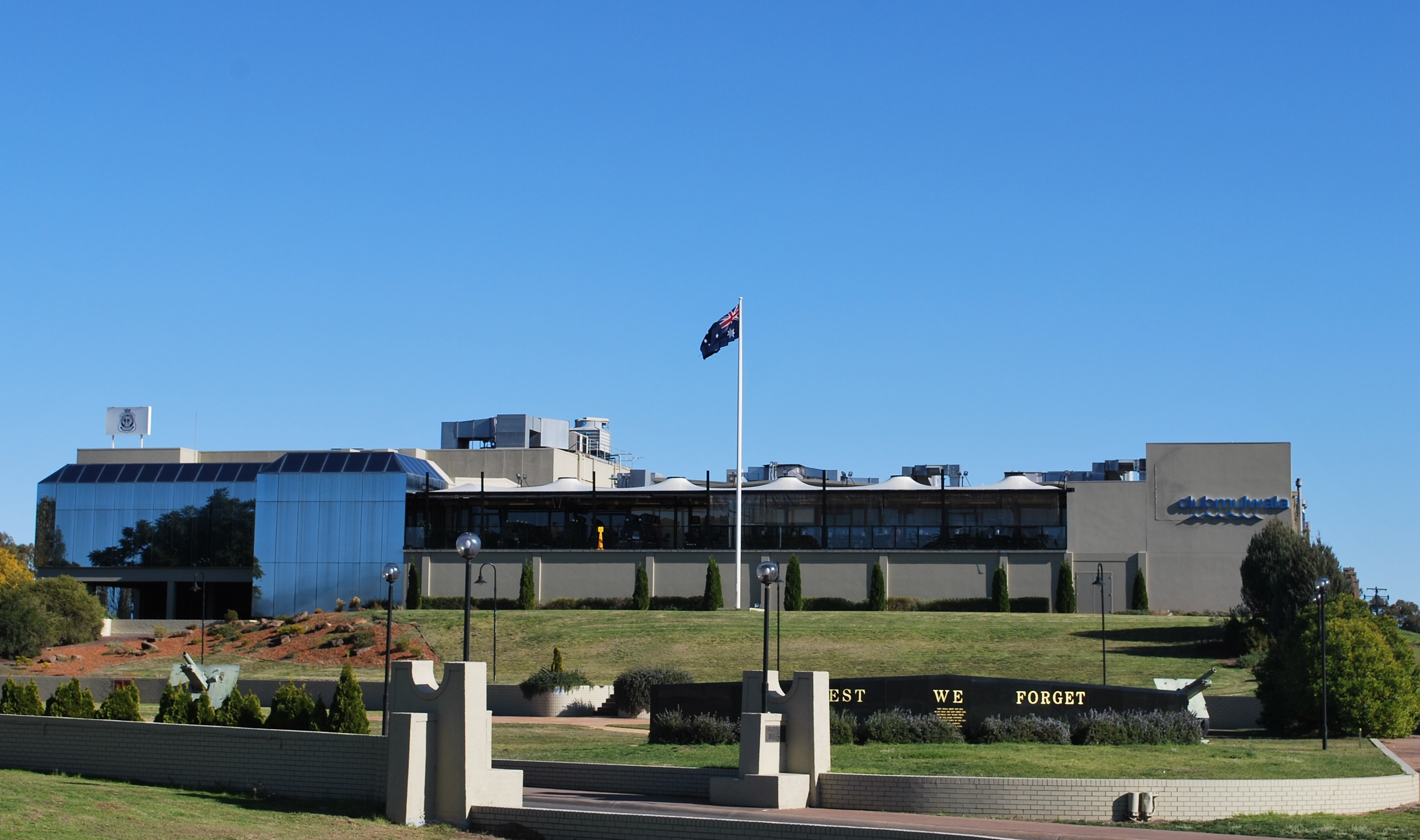
The Services club at Mulwala. The licensed clubs are an important part of the Mulwala economy, although less so since poker machines were legalised in Victoria in 1992.

In 1847 James McRae arrived in the district to take charge of "Mulwala" and "Boroge" stations on behalf of the squatter Linbourne. McRae built a punt and a public house at the locality. He obtained a licence for his Travellers' Rest Hotel in 1853.

In 1858 Surveyor Adams marked out a township at the site. In 1866 a new hotel was opened at Mulwala and a school established at the township. Mulwala Post Office opened in 1864 for about six weeks, closed due to a large fire, and was reopened on 1 June 1866. The pioneer, James McRae, died in 1866.

In 1872 Mulwala was described as a small township of about 100 inhabitants, possessing a church, a school, a post-office and a public house.

In 1887 it was reported that Mulwala had two hotels and two stores; a court-house had been erected and a sawmill started.

In 1972, Mulwala was the site for a large outdoor pop music festival, which despite boasting big Australian names (Chain, Doug Parkinson, Billy Thorpe and the Aztecs) and some overseas artists (Canned Heat, Stephen Stills & Manassas), was considered a flop, after rain had washed out the site by the third day.

On 21 March 2013, Mulwala was one of the areas affected by a tornado, injuring over 20 people and damaging several buildings and houses. A caravan park approximately 5 km east of Mulwala was severely affected with most of the park's caravans damaged beyond repair.

=== Heritage listings ===
Mulwala contains a number of heritage-listed sites, including:

- North Road: Mulwala Homestead

== Transport ==
Mulwala Railway Station is a station with a silo on the Oaklands railway line.

== Sport ==
Australian rules football, cricket and netball are the most popular sports. The Mulwala Football Club, founded 1882 and based at the Lonsdale Reserve, competes in the Murray Football Netball League and is a successful club with 8 premierships. In cricket, the Yarrawonga Mulwala Cricket Club (based in Yarrawonga) represents in the local competition.

== Notable people ==
- Col Anderson, Australian rules footballer
- Caleb Mitchell, Australian rules footballer
- Mark McGough, Australian rules footballer
