= List of rail accidents (1930–1939) =

A rail accident (or train wreck) is a type of disaster involving one or more trains. Train wrecks often occur as a result of miscommunication, as when a moving train meets another train on the same track, when the wheels of train come off the track or when a boiler explosion occurs. Train accidents have been widely covered in popular media and in folklore.

== 1930 ==
- January 6 – United Kingdom – The rear carriages of a Southern Railway passenger train from Hastings to London are partially buried by a landslip near Wadhurst tunnel. The train is divided and the front part continues on to Tunbridge Wells, where it arrives 100 minutes late.
- March 6 – United Kingdom – a London, Midland and Scottish Railway passenger train departs from Culgaith station, Cumberland against signals. It is in collision with a ballast train at Langwathby station, Cumberland. Two people die and four are seriously injured.
- March 17 - United States - Adams, Tennessee - L&N steam engine pulling a freight train explodes, killing 4 trainmen and 2 hobos
- March 22 – United Kingdom – A London, Midland and Scottish Railway Royal Scot express passenger train derails at Leighton Buzzard, Bedfordshire when a crossover is taken at excessive speed.
- April 7 – Japan – Ōita: Perhaps due to a blasting accident at the colliery, some dynamite ends up in a train's coal supply. When it explodes, the locomotive and several cars are wrecked, 17 people die and two are seriously injured, and a forest fire is ignited.
- April 16 – USSR – At Domodedovo, now in Russia, some denatured alcohol spilled in a train is accidentally ignited. The fire results in the deaths of 45 people and seriously injures 23.
- May 20 – USSR – At Chernaya on the Moscow-Kazan line (all these places are now in Russia), the collision of a passenger and a freight train results in the deaths of 28 and severely injures 29.
- June 29 – USSR – A train from Irkutsk (now in Russia) to Leningrad (now St. Petersburg, Russia) is derailed near its destination due to a signalman's error; 22 die and 28 are seriously injured.
- July 16 – Romania – The collision of a passenger and a freight train between Petrova and Vișeu Bistra results in the deaths of 22 people.
- December 27 – China – A passenger train on a branch line of the Peking-Mukden Railway (those cities are now Beijing and Shenyang) is deliberately wrecked by bandits; the locomotive boiler explodes and 20 passengers are kidnapped for ransom. Altogether 80 people are killed.

== 1931 ==
- January 3 – United Kingdom – A London and North Eastern Railway passenger train derails at Carlisle, Cumberland due to excessive speed through a curve. Three people are killed.
- January 17 – United Kingdom – A London and North Eastern Railway newspaper train departs from Thorpe-le-Soken station, Essex against signals and collides head-on with a light engine at Great Holland. Two people are killed.
- March 22 – United Kingdom – A London, Midland and Scottish Railway express passenger train derails at Leighton Buzzard, Bedfordshire due to excessive speed through a crossover. Six people are killed.
- April 20 – China – Following heavy rain, an embankment collapses under a passenger train from Humchun to Kowloon, Hong Kong. At least 30 are killed and 20 to 30 seriously injured.
- April 29 – Egypt – The rear cars of a passenger train from Alexandria to Cairo, crowded with passengers due to the Eid al-Adha holiday, catch fire on the approach to Benha station. Many passengers jump from the moving train rather than wait for the station. Altogether 48 people are killed.
- May 27 – United Kingdom – A London and North Eastern Railway passenger train overruns signals and collides head-on with another passenger train at Fakenham East station, Norfolk. One person is killed and fifteen are injured.
- May 27 – United States – The Empire Builder, en route from Seattle to Chicago with 117 passengers, is struck by an F3 tornado in Clay County, Minnesota; all the cars (except the locomotive and coal tender) are blown off the track with one car thrown some 80 feet. One passenger is killed and 57 more are injured.
- June 17 – United Kingdom – A London Midland and Scottish Railway mail train overruns signals and rear-ends an express freight train at Crich, Derbyshire. Two people are killed and seventeen injured.
- August 8 – Germany - Szilveszter Matuska's first successful derailment, the Berlin to Basel, Switzerland express train south of Berlin on 8 August 1931.
- September 13 – Hungary – Soon after leaving Budapest, an international express en route to Paris and Ostend is destroyed by a dynamite bomb on a bridge at Biatorbágy. Most of the train falls 100 feet (30 m); 22 passengers are killed. The bomber, Szilveszter Matuska, pretends to be a victim and sues the railway, but police checking his story become suspicious. Eventually he is given a death sentence, which is then commuted.
- September 18 – China, Liaoning, Mukden – Mukden Incident.
- late September – USSR – A troop train southwest of Leningrad (now Saint Petersburg, Russia) explodes with heavy loss of life.
- December – United Kingdom – At Dagenham Dock, Essex, a London and North Eastern Railway passenger train runs into wagons from the preceding freight train, which had been left on the line after a coupling broke. Two people are killed.
- December 25 - United States - A Southern Pacific class GS-1 4-8-4 #4402 suffers a boiler explosion in Richvale, California. The locomotive was later rebuilt in February 1932 and saw many years of service until it was scrapped on April 24, 1959.

== 1932 ==
- January 2 – USSR – At Kosino, just outside Moscow, a train moving at 40 mph (64 km/h) hits the rear of a stopped suburban train. Although there is time, nobody acts to protect the wreckage and a train of empty freight wagons crashes into it. Altogether 68 people are killed and 130 injured, and 11 railwaymen are arrested for criminal negligence.
- July 17 – South Africa – At Leeudoorn Stad (now Leeuwdoringstad), southwest of Orkney, a freight train is destroyed by the explosion of over 300 long tons (300 t) of dynamite in 52 wagons. Two craters 40 feet (12 m) deep are left, 5 people killed, 7 injured, and 250 yards (230 m) of track destroyed.
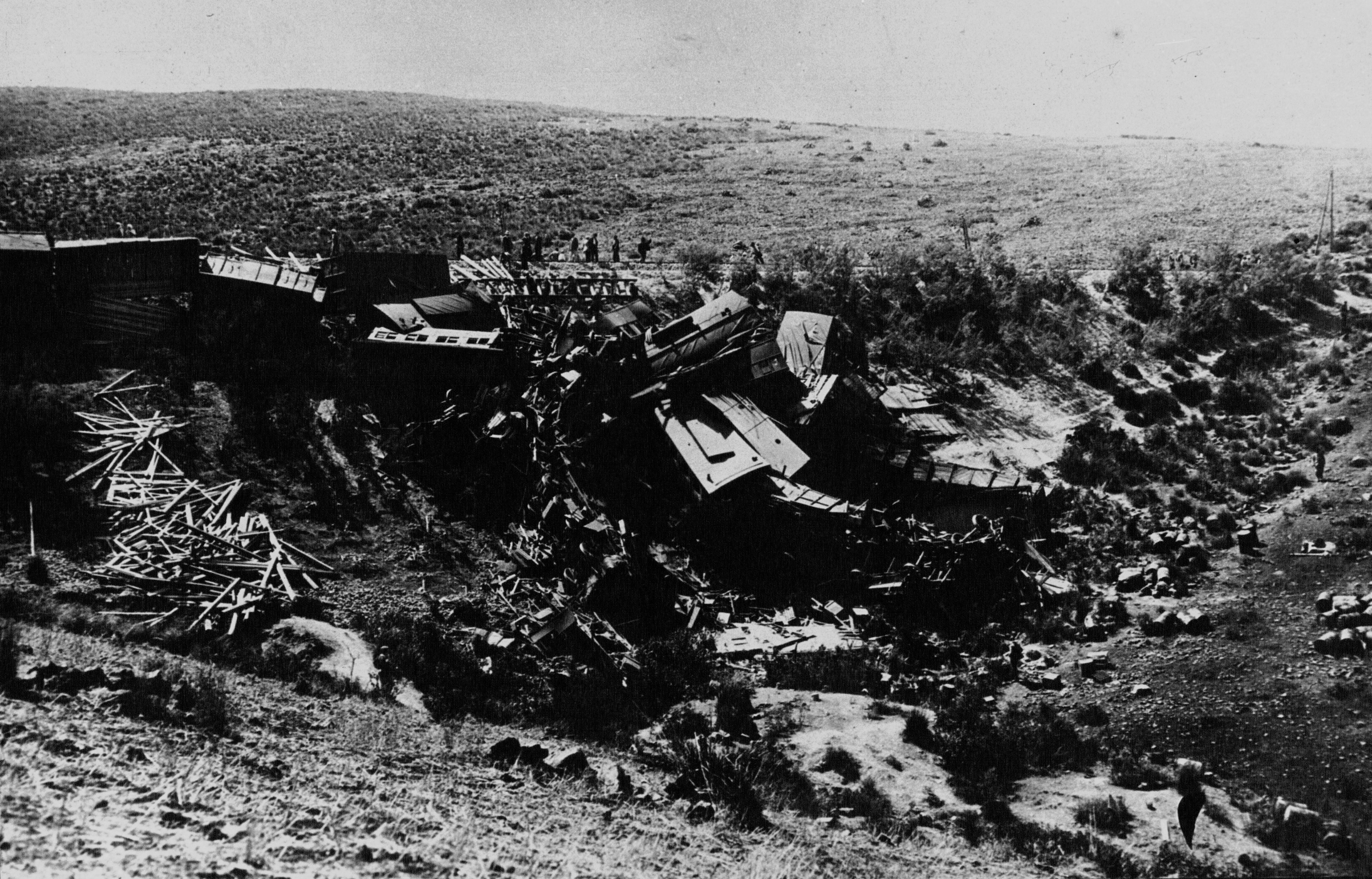
- Turenne rail accident
  September 14 – French Algeria – Turenne rail accident: A 14-car troop train of the French Foreign Legion derails in the Atlas Mountains and plunges 250 feet (76 m) into a gorge. 57 legionnaires and most of the train's crew die; 223 are injured.
- October 16 – France – A passenger train rams a freight train near Cérences station, Manche, Normandy, and goes down a steep grade, splintering the lead coaches. Five men and two women are killed and fifteen others injured, all being residents of the local area where the accident occurred.
- October 18 – USSR – Heavy loss of life occurs when the Black Sea express train, coming from Sochi, strikes a freight car that had been mistakenly switched to the express tracks at Lublinov station, eleven kilometers from Moscow, telescoping five cars, three of them passenger coaches. Casualties include 36 killed and 51 injured. On October 31, the Soviet government sentences to death the station master whose negligence caused the accident. Three others also sharing responsibility receive prison terms.
- December 14 – Switzerland – A collision in the Gutsch Tunnel on the Zug–Lucerne railway kills at least six people.

== 1933 ==
- March 4 – United Kingdom – Great Western Railway freight train is struck by a landslide at Vriog, Merionethshire. The locomotive is pushed into the sea, both engine crew are killed.
- March 17 – Manchukuo (now part of China) – A passenger train is stopped between Chengchitun and Ssupingkai (now Siping) due to a "dislocation of the rails" and a freight train collides with its rear, killing 50 people and injuring 70.
- May 25 – United Kingdom – A Southern Railway passenger train derails at Raynes Park, London and comes to rest foul of the adjacent line. A passing express train collides with it, killing five people and injuring 35. The cause was a failure to implement a speed restriction during permanent way works.
- July 10 – United Kingdom – A London Midland and Scottish Railway express passenger train collides with a freight train at Little Salkeld, Cumberland due to a signalman's error. One person is killed.
- September 5 – United States – A milk train goes through a stop signal and collides with a stopped Erie Railroad passenger train in Binghamton, New York. 14 people are killed, and 30 are injured.
- September 8 – United Kingdom – A passenger train runs into four wagons which had been left on the line at Bowling Basin, Dunbartonshire during shunting operations. Five people are injured.
- October 24 – France – A Chemins de fer de l'État express from Cherbourg to Paris derails at 65 mph (105 km/h) between Saint-Élier and Conches-en-Ouche, and part of the train falls into the river Iton; 36 people are killed and 68 injured.
- December 19 – United Kingdom – retired locomotive engineer George Jackson Churchward stepped onto the track near Swindon to examine a faulty rail fastening and was struck and killed by an express train hauled by locomotive 4085 Berkeley Castle. He was suffering from failing eyesight and hearing.
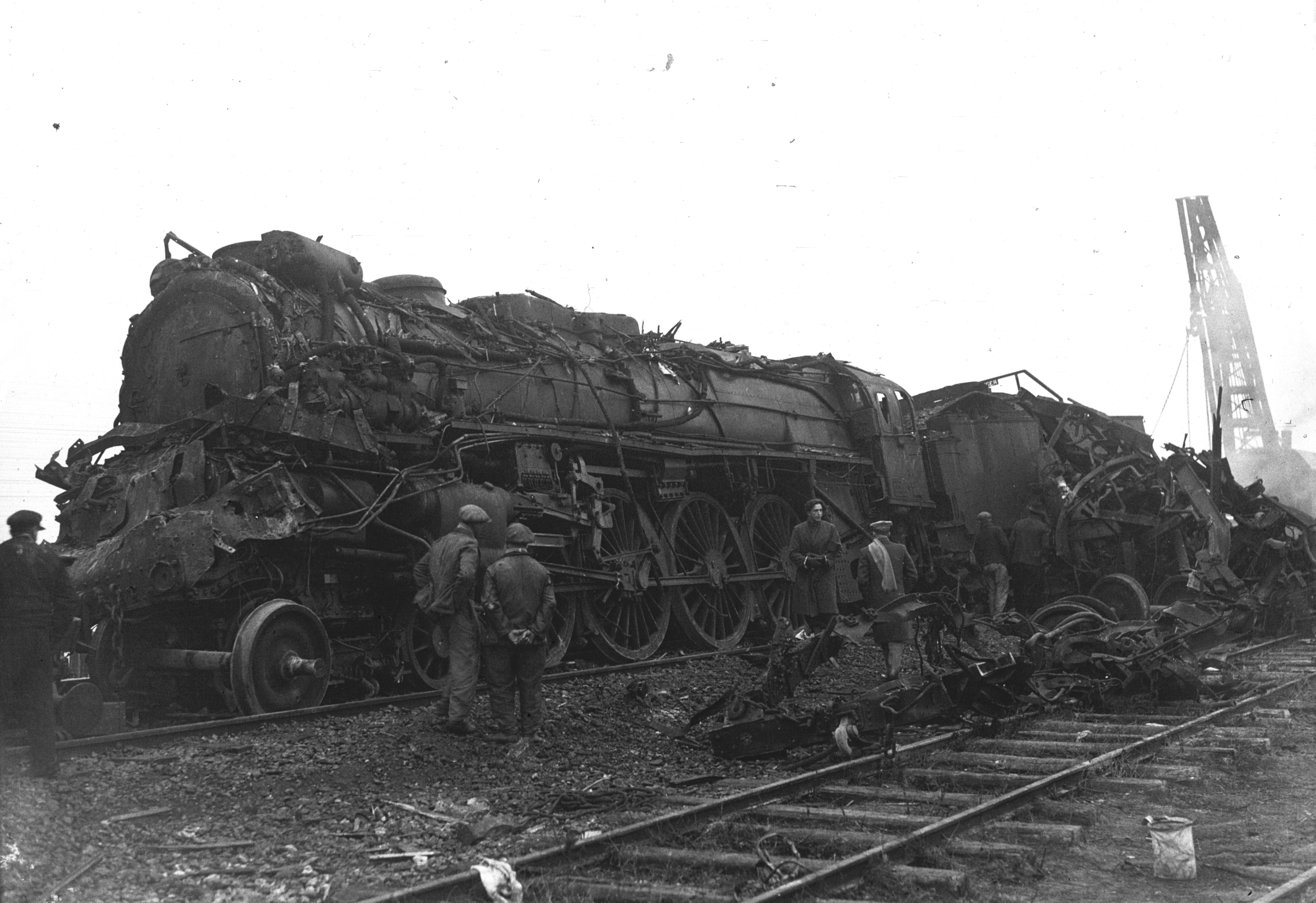
- Lagny-Pomponne rail accident
  December 23 – France – Lagny-Pomponne rail accident: Rear-end collision of Paris-Nancy express and Paris-Strasbourg fast train between Lagny-sur-Marne and Pomponne (Seine-et-Marne), 17 mi (23 km) out of Paris. 204 are killed and 300 injured aboard the Nancy express as its 7 wooden coaches are smashed. The driver of the Strasbourg train had passed a signal at danger in darkness and fog, but the "Crocodile" acoustic warning system was found to have failed because the contacts had iced over. The Compagnie de Chemin de Fer de l'Est was ordered to pay FFr44,000,000 in compensation to victims' families.

== 1934 ==
- February 18 – Italy – Near Populonia, on the single-track line from Campiglia Marittima to Piombino, a gasoline-powered railcar going 75 mph (120 km/h) collides with a steam special and catches fire. Of 48 passengers in the railcar, 34 are killed.
- February 26 – United States – Seven passengers and two enginemen are killed and some 40 others injured when a Fort Wayne Division Akron-to-Pittsburgh train of the Pennsylvania Railroad derails one mile (1600 m) short of Penn Station, its destination, just before 2200 hrs. Hitting a frozen switch, the pony truck on locomotive 1638 derails, turning the engine and tender over an embankment into Merchant Street and smashing a signal tower "to splinters" in the process. Two Pullman cars behind the motive power derail but stay upright, but a following coach and diner drop 20 feet (6.1 m) to the street when their couplings break. It is in the coach that the fatalities occur.
- February 26 – United States – The Pennsylvania Railroad express, the Fort Dearborn, struck a truck at a grade crossing in a snowstorm at Delphos, Ohio. The engine overturned and seven cars derailed, killing the engineer and fireman, the truck driver, and injuring four more.
- March 4 – USSR – At a station 5 miles (8.0 km) from Moscow (now in Russia), a stationary train is struck by another one, killing 19 and injuring 52. The enginemen of the second train are sentenced to death and three other railwaymen to prison.
- March 12 – USSR – At Tavatuy, which is northwest of Sverdlovsk (now Yekaterinburg, both places now in Russia), a passenger train runs past signals and crashes into a freight; 33 are killed and 68 injured.
- March 14 – El Salvador – The explosion of 7 tons of dynamite on a train at La Libertad, a port southwest of San Salvador, kills at least 250 people and injures about 1,000, and destroys many homes. Also involved in the fire are 4,000 cases of gasoline and 15,000 sacks of coffee.
- September 6 – United Kingdom – Two London Midland and Scottish Railway passenger trains collide at Port Eglinton Junction, Glasgow, Renfrewshire because the driver of one of them misreads signals. Nine people are killed and 58 are injured.
- September 28 – United Kingdom – Winwick rail crash, near Warrington: Overworked signal box crew forget a train halted at a signal and allow another train into section; 12 people killed.
- November – United Kingdom – a London and North Eastern Railway passenger train collides with a lorry on a level crossing at Wormley, Hertfordshire and is derailed. Both locomotive crew are killed.
- December 27– United States – Powellton, West Virginia: A train carrying miners and their families suffers a boiler explosion. The boiler shoots up into the air and lands on the first coach crushing seventeen people to death.

== 1935 ==
- January 6 – USSR – At Porbelo on the railway from Leningrad (now St. Petersburg) to Moscow, all now in Russia, an express from Leningrad to Tiflis (now Tbilisi, Georgia) is stopped by a broken rail. The following train, an express to Moscow, runs past signals and crashes into it, killing 23 and badly injuring 56. Seven railwaymen are convicted of criminal negligence.
- February 25 – United Kingdom – A London Midland and Scottish Railway passenger train is derailed at Ashton-under-Hill, Worcestershire due to a combination of defective track and locomotive design. One person is killed.
- March 13 – United Kingdom – A London Midland and Scottish Railway express freight train is halted at Kings Langley, Hertfordshire due to a defective vacuum brake. A milk train runs into its rear and a coal train runs into the wreckage of the two trains. The line is reopened the next day.
- April 11 – United States – Rockville, Maryland: A school bus driver, returning students to Williamsport, Maryland from a field trip at 11:30pm, does not notice the reflective signs at a grade crossing and drives his bus into the path of an oncoming Baltimore & Ohio train. 14 students are killed, 15 others injured. In violation of a Maryland law requiring watchmen at crossings until midnight, the B&O had kept a watchman on duty only until 10pm.
- June 15 – United Kingdom – 1935 Welwyn Garden City rail crash: A signalman's error on the London and North Eastern Railway leads to one express train crashing into the rear of another, killing 13 passengers and injuring 81.
- June 25 – Ireland – Dún Laoghaire: The Drumm Train, a Battery Electric Multiple Unit, runs into a landslide between Dún Laoghaire and Sandycove. The train is derailed and is consequently damaged by fire.
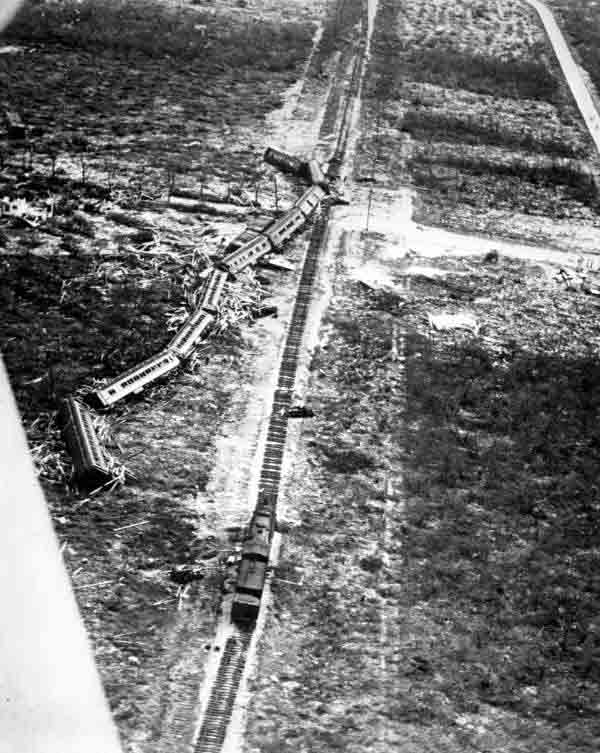
- Overseas Railroad rescue train at Islamorada, 1935
  September 2 – United States – Islamorada, Florida: The upper Florida Keys are hit by the 1935 Labor Day hurricane. A 10-car rescue train is sent by the Florida East Coast Railway to evacuate hundreds of World War I veterans from government work camps, but is washed from the tracks when the Overseas Railroad is engulfed by a storm surge at Islamorada. Total train fatalities not known (at least 408 estimated storm deaths). Railway link to Florida Keys is left destroyed. The accident is mentioned in the film Key Largo.
- October 16 – Brazil – In the suburbs of Rio de Janeiro, an express hits a stationary passenger train, killing 20 and injuring over 100.
- December 13 – United States – Dearing, Georgia: Three trainmen were killed and ten others injured in the head-on collision of two Georgia Railroad trains at the station in this town near Augusta. The train bound from Augusta to Atlanta overran a switch and struck a train bound to Augusta from Atlanta which was standing at the depot.
- December 24 – Germany – Großheringen: A double-headed express from Berlin to Basel runs past signals and crashes into an Erfurt-Leipzig local on the junction next to a bridge. Some wreckage and bodies end up in the river Saale; 33 people are killed, 7 missing, and 27 seriously injured.

== 1936 ==
- January 15 – United Kingdom – A Great Western Railway freight train divided at Shrivenham, Oxfordshire leaving six wagons on the main line. A following sleeping car express hauled by King Class locomotive 6007 King William III runs into the wagons at almost 60 miles per hour (97 km/h). Two people are killed.
- April 16 – Japan – At the Sumitomo Mine in Tadakuma, Iizuka, the cable snaps on the cable railway used by workers, and the emergency brakes do not hold. The 9-car train runs away and 52 people are killed, 2 missing, and 28 injured.
- June 22 – USSR – At Karymskoye, now in Russia, a train is allowed to set out while the track ahead is occupied. The rear-end collision kills 51 people and injures 52; the stationmaster is sentenced to death and eight other people to prison.
- July 25 - United States - Denver & Rio Grande Western 346, at the time on loan to the Colorado & Southern, wrecked on Kenosha Pass after the engineer failed to slow down for a corner. The engine was running light and only the engineer was killed, the fireman seeing the impending wreck jumped clear of the engine.
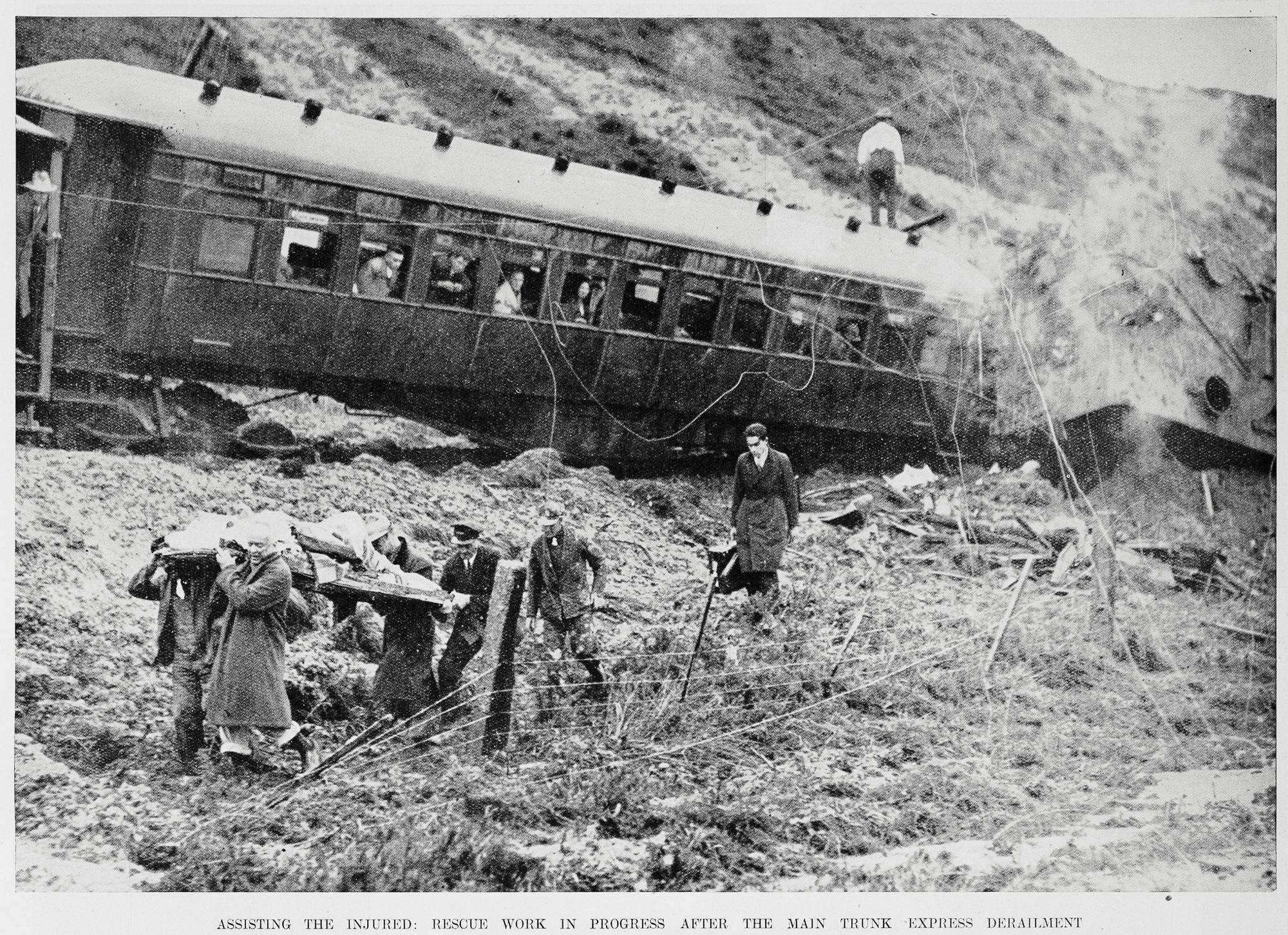
- 1936 Paraparaumu train wreck
  August 30 - New Zealand - 1936 Paraparaumu train wreck, in Paraparaumu, a passenger train travelling from Auckland to Wellington derailed in Paraparaumu after striking a landslide that slid on the tracks during a heave rain. One person was killed and five people were injured.
- October 1 – Poland – A German passenger train from Berlin to Piala (now Baltiysk, Russia)) collides with a freight at Lamberg in the Polish Corridor, killing 20 people and injuring 150.
- October 10 – Colombia – A trainload of troops is sent to combat bandits; the two rear cars break away, perhaps because of sabotage, and overturn, killing 30 people and injuring 40.
- United Kingdom – A Southern Railway boat train catches fire at Winchester station, Hampshire due to an electrical fault.

== 1937 ==
- January 16 – China – Sheklung: Aboard an express from Hong Kong to Canton (now Guangzhou), fire broke out in the third-class section. One source refers to a passenger setting fire to a toy made of celluloid, another to a sulfuric acid explosion. The train has neither continuous brakes nor any way to notify the driver. The three rear cars of the train are completely burned and bodies of passengers who jumped are scattered along the tracks. Altogether 112 people are killed and at least 40 injured.
- February 15 – United Kingdom – A London and North Eastern Railway express passenger train derailed at Sleaford North Junction, Lincolnshire due to excessive speed on a curve killing four and injuring 15.
- March 1 – United Kingdom – A Great Western Railway passenger train collided with a freight train at Langley, Buckinghamshire and derailed killing one and injuring six.
- March 8 – United Kingdom – A London and North Eastern Railway passenger train derailed at Langrick, Lincolnshire due to defective track.
- March – USSR – An official announcement states that 72 employees of the Soviet Railways have been found responsible for an accident in Siberia (now in Russia) and executed, and another 3,000 railway officials are under arrest; presumably this is actually part of the Great Purge.
- April 2 – United Kingdom – Battersea Park rail crash: Two passenger trains collide killing 10 and injuring 17. The signalman believed there was a fault with his equipment and overrode the interlocking.
- April 26 – United States – Dominguez Canyon rail crash: A Denver and Rio Grande Western Railroad passenger train crashed into Wells Gulch at around 20:00 due to burned out trestle, killing 2 and injuring 7. The engineer, CD Freeman, and the fireman, FS Perkins, were killed when the train fell through the unsupported rails due to the trestle having burned out earlier in the day. Due to the darkness the crew did not realize that the trestle had burned out; the crash was ruled accidental.
- June 13 – United Kingdom – A London and North Eastern Railway passenger train derails south of Durham because the driver misreads signals. Nine people are injured.
- June 28 – United Kingdom – A Southern Railway passenger train overruns signals and crashes into an electricity substation at Swanley Junction, Kent. The train had been ordered to make an unscheduled stop at Swanley but the driver was not told of this. Four people were killed.
- July 17 – British India – An express from Punjab to Howrah derails on damaged track at Bihta, and four cars telescoped together; 107 people were killed and about 65 injured. The Bihta deputy traffic controller was convicted for allowing trains to run at full speed after the track damage was reported. Testing reveals that the damage was caused by the Class XB locomotives in use on the line, which were prone to dangerous oscillations when running at speed.
- July 29 – France – At Villeneuve-Saint-Georges station just outside Paris, railway staff became confused as to whether PLM railway train 107 was going toward Melun or its actual destination of Nîmes. The power-operated switch was moved while the train was crossing it at 50 mph (80 km/h), and the derailment killed 29 people.
- November 16 – United Kingdom – A Great Western Railway steam railcar overruns a signal and diverts into a short siding. It overruns the buffers and collides with a signal box at Ealing, London.
- November 17 – United Kingdom – A London, Midland and Scottish Railway passenger train overruns signals and rear-ends an express passenger train at Coppenhall Junction, Crewe, Cheshire.
- November 18 – Canada – Thirteen cars of a Canadian Pacific Railway train derail near Red Rock, Ontario with some of the cars falling onto the adjacent Canadian National Railways track, effectively blocking traffic on both railways.
- December 4 – Spain – A 10-car steam train and a 2-car electric one collide at Valencia, killing 20 people.
- December 10 – United Kingdom – Castlecary rail accident: A London and North Eastern Railway Edinburgh-Glasgow commuter express, travelling 70 mph (110 km/h) in white-out conditions, passes a danger signal and rear-ends a local train standing in the station; 35 are killed and 179 injured, most seriously. The local had been running late.

== 1938 ==
- January 3 – China – A train from Canton (now Guangzhou) to Hankou (now Wuhan) derails owing to subsidence at Shinchow. At least 100 people are killed and injured.
- January 3 – China – A train from Canton (now Guangzhou) to Wachung hits debris in a tunnel damaged by Japanese bombs; 42 are killed.
- January 16 – China – Fire breaks out, possibly due to arson, aboard an express on the Kowloon-Canton Railway, Kowloon being in Hong Kong, and Canton now being Guangzhou. There are 87 people killed and 30 injured, all in one car of the train.
- January 21 – United Kingdom – An express passenger train collides with an empty coaching stock train at Oakley Junction, Bedfordshire due to a signalman's error. Three people are killed and 46 injured.
- March 10 - United Kingdom - Charing Cross (Northern Line) tube crash, in Charing Cross, a London Underground train collided onto equipment and derailed, no one was killed but 12 people sustained injuries.
- March 29 – Spain – At a level crossing near Valencia, a train crashes into a gasoline truck and catches on fire; 39 people are killed.
- April 4 – Southern Rhodesia (now Zimbabwe) – While running through a narrow cutting between Plumtree and Tsessebe (near the border with Bechuanaland, now Botswana), an international express from Bulawayo to Cape Town collides head-on with a freight train whose crew has been given erroneous train orders. Altogether 26 people are killed and 22 injured; rescue is impaired by the inaccessible location, but some uninjured passengers give first aid to the victims.
- May 17 - United Kingdom - Charing Cross (District Line) tube crash, in Charing Cross, a London Underground train on the District Line collided with another train during maintenance, 6 people were killed and 46 people were injured.
- June 19 – United States – Custer Creek train wreck: Milwaukee Road's Olympian plunges into Custer Creek when a 25-year-old bridge, weakened by heavy rain, collapses; 47 people killed, many victims in a tourist sleeper that is submerged in 20 feet (6 m) of water for almost 36 hours. Some bodies recovered as far as 50 miles (80 km) downstream.
- July 30 – Jamaica – near Balaclava Station, five overcrowded cars derail; 32 killed, 70 injured.
- August 21 – British India – At Vadamadura on the South Indian Railway, flood damage to a bridge derails a crowded train, killing 33 people and injuring 93.
- August 19 – United Kingdom – A Great Western Railway express passenger train is diverted into a siding at Newport, Monmouthshire due to a signalman's error. The train crashes through the buffers but comes to rest short of the River Usk.
- September 25 – Spain – On a single-track section at Martorell, northwest of Barcelona, a special train from Vilafranca del Penedès collides with a regular train from the coast.
- December 1 – United States – A school bus carrying 39 students in Sandy, Utah pulls onto a railroad track crossing during a snowstorm. A Denver & Rio Grande Western freight train comprising more than 80 cars emerged from the storm, killing the bus driver and 23 students.
- December 19 – Brazil – On the Central Railway of Brazil, a passenger train crew picks up the wrong order and collides with a freight train between João Ayres and Sitio; 42 people are killed and at least 70 injured.
- December 24 – Romania – At Etulia (now in Moldova), two passenger trains collide head-on on single track due to a misunderstanding between stationmasters. One is a local; the other is carrying soldiers going on leave. Altogether 93 people are killed, including a general and two colonels, and 147 are injured.

== 1939 ==
- January 4 – Canada – The derailment of a westbound Canadian Pacific Railway freight train near Nelson, British Columbia, kills the engineer and injures other crewmen.
- January 12 – British India – At Hazaribagh on the East Indian Railway, saboteurs remove a 36-foot (11 m) length of rail. The locomotive of the Dehra Dun Express from Howrah actually makes it across the gap and regains the rails, but the track is sufficiently damaged that the rest of the train is derailed, with 21 deaths and 71 injuries. A reward offer of 25,000 rupees fails to lead to a prosecution. This is one of 131 sabotage attempts against the railway in a 10-year period.
- January 26 – United Kingdom – An empty fish train runs into the back of a passenger train near Hatfield, Hertfordshire.
- January 26 – United Kingdom – A passenger train runs into the back of another near Hatfield. Two people are killed and seven are injured.
- February 11 – Spain – Sarrià-Sant Gervasi: A workman's train runs away downhill, crashing into a stationary wagon and then the rear of another train; 53 are killed and at least 100 injured.
- April 13 – Mexico – During the period of disruption following the nationalization of Mexico's railways, trains from Guadalajara and Laredo, Texas, collide and 12 passenger cars are destroyed; at least 26 people are killed.
- April 16 - United States - In Windber, Massachusetts, a flood caused many trolley trains to wash away, the damaged trolley trains are dirty and now used as a display and a museum. no problems reported.
- April 17 – British India – At Majhdia, 66 miles (106 km) from Calcutta (now Kolkata) on the Eastern Bengal Railway, the North Bengal Express collides with the Dacca Mail (Dacca is now Dhaka, Bangladesh), killing 35 people including two Bengal legislators, and injuring 31.
- April 27 – United States – A log truck across the track sends a Union Pacific passenger train flying off the tracks in Bucoda, Washington; the train engineer and fireman were killed, along with the truck driver, while six passengers were injured.
- June 1 – United Kingdom – A London and North Eastern Railway express passenger train collides with a lorry on a level crossing at Hilgay Fen, Norfolk and is derailed. Four people are killed and twelve injured.
- June 8 – United Kingdom – Two passenger trains collide at Manchester Central station, Lancashire because one of them was departing against a danger signal.
- August 5 – United Kingdom – A London, Midland and Scottish Railway express passenger train derails at Saltcoats, Ayrshire when vandals place rocks on the line. Four people are killed.
- August 5 – United Kingdom – Workmen building a new military camp crossing the Southern Railway line at Bramshot Halt are struck by an express train. Three are killed and others seriously injured.
- August 12 – United States – 1939 City of San Francisco derailment – An act of sabotage sends the City of San Francisco flying off a bridge in the Nevada desert; 24 passengers and crew members are killed, and five cars are destroyed. This case remains unsolved.
- September 2 – France – A collision at Les Aubrais kills 35 and injures 77.
- October 8 – Germany – At Gesundbrunnen in Berlin, an express from Sassnitz collides with another passenger train, killing 20 people.
- October 14 – United Kingdom – Bletchley, Buckinghamshire: The London Midland and Scottish Railway Night Scot express passenger train collides with a LNWR Class G1 locomotive that was adding a van at the rear of a Euston-Inverness passenger train at Bletchley railway station, demolishing a part of the station. Five people are killed and over 30 are injured. Both drivers of the Night Scot failed to observe several signals properly.
- October 16 – United Kingdom – A London Midland and Scottish Railway train is involved in an accident at Winwick Junction, Cheshire. The report into the accident is declared secret due to World War II.
- October 21 – Mexico – A freight train from Veracruz to the Pacific coast, with workers and their families on board, derails and catches fire between Santa Lucrecia and Matías Romero; 40 are killed.
- October 26 – Germany – An accident at St. Valentin (now in Austria) kills at least 20 people and seriously injures 30.
- October 30 – Italy – An electric train from Milan to Rome gets only as far as Lambrate before colliding with an express from Venice; about 20 are killed.
- November 12 – Germany – On the single-track branch line, now in Poland, between Cosel and Bauerwitz (now Koźle and Baborów), a signalman's error at Rosengrund (now Zakrzów) causes a collision of two crowded local trains between there and Langlieben (now Długomiłowice). There are 43 dead and 60 injured.
- November 20 – Germany – At Spandau in Berlin, nine people die in a collision.
- November 26 – Germany – Nieder Wöllstadt: 15 people die in a collision.
- December 1 – Romania – A construction special, carrying workers and materials for a new branch from Avrig to nearby Mârșa, runs away downhill and crashes near Sibiu; 20 people die and 16 are seriously injured.
- December 12 – Germany – Hagen: A head-on collision results in the deaths of 15 people.
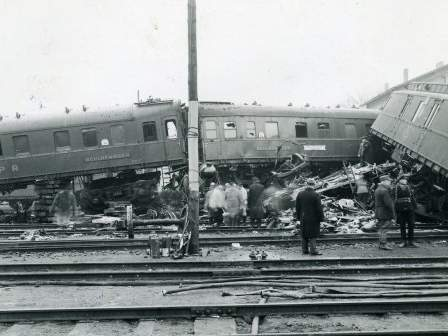
- Genthin rail disaster
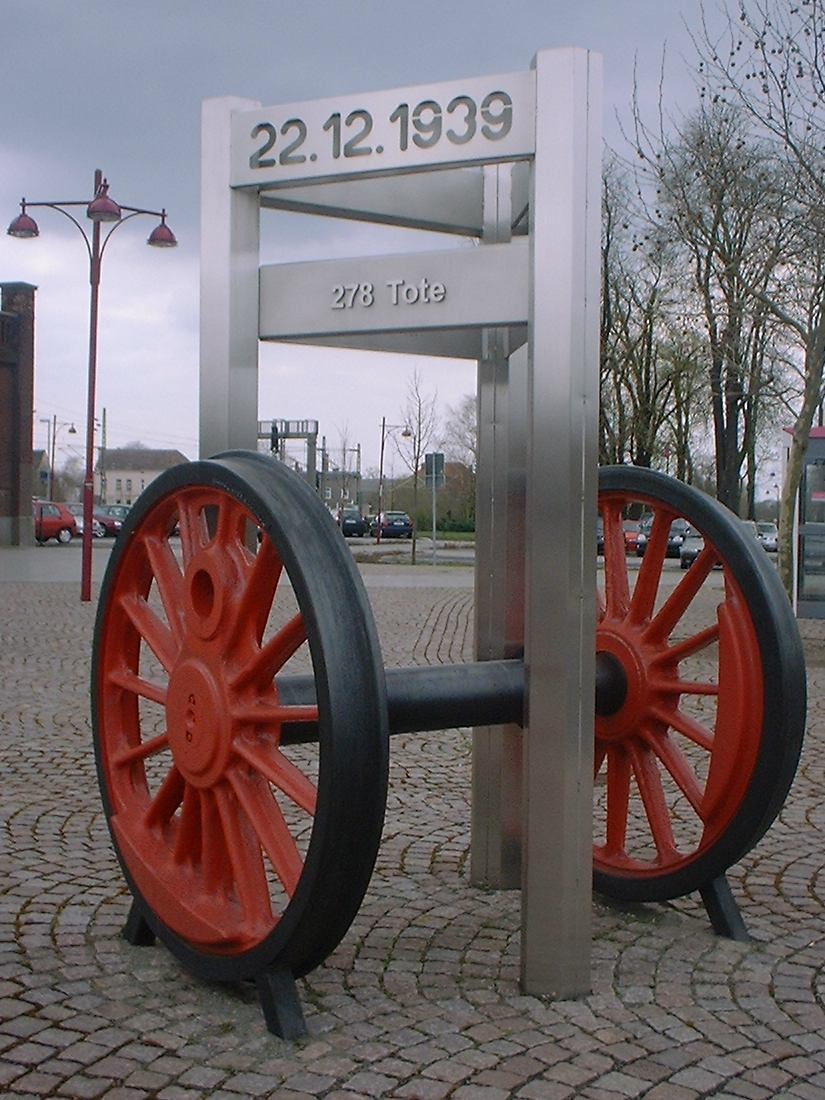
  Genthin rail crash memorial
  December 22 – Germany – Genthin rail disaster: Collision when train D180 drives into previously delayed and overcrowded train D10 from Berlin to Cologne. 278 dead, 453 injured. Highest number of fatalities ever in an accident in Germany.
- December 22 – Germany – Markdorf rail disaster: Mistake of a traffic controller leads to a head-on collision of a passenger train and a goods train, bad weather, and wartime restrictions contributed to the crash. 101 dead, 47 injured.
- December 30 – Italy – A troop train stops at Torre Annunziata to be overtaken by the Calabria express, but cannot be sidetracked because the points are frozen. The troop train is ordered to proceed, but the express runs past signals and crashes into it, results in the deaths of 29 people.

== See also ==
- London Underground accidents

== Sources ==
- "Europe's history of rail disasters". BBC. October 11, 2006.
- "World's worst rail disasters". BBC. December 19, 2007.
- "GenDisasters Train Wrecks 1869–1943". Archived from the original on 2015-04-16.
- "Interstate Commerce Commission Investigations of Railroad Accidents 1911–1993". U.S. Department of Transportation. Archived from the original on 2004-10-12.
- Earnshaw, Alan (1989). Trains in Trouble: Vol. 5. Penryn: Atlantic Books. ISBN 0-906899-35-4.
- Earnshaw, Alan (1990). Trains in Trouble: Vol. 6. Penryn: Atlantic Books. ISBN 0-906899-37-0.
- Earnshaw, Alan (1993). Trains in Trouble: Vol. 8. Penryn: Atlantic Books. ISBN 0-906899-52-4.
- Hall, Stanley (1990). The Railway Detectives. London: Ian Allan. ISBN 0-7110-1929-0.
- Hoole, Ken (1982). Trains in Trouble: Vol. 3. Redruth: Atlantic Books. ISBN 0-906899-05-2.
- Hoole, Ken (1983). Trains in Trouble: Vol. 4. Truro: Atlantic Books. ISBN 0-906899-07-9.
- Kichenside, Geoffrey (1997). Great Train Disasters. Bristol: Siena Books. ISBN 0-75252-630-8.
- Rolt, L. T. C.; Kichenside, G. M. (1982). Red for Danger: A history of railway accidents and railway safety (4th ed.). Newton Abbot, Devon: David & Charles. ISBN 0-7153-8362-0. OCLC 9526651.
- Semmens, Peter (1994). Railway Disasters of the World: Principal Passenger Train Accidents of the 20th Century. Patrick Stephens Ltd. ISBN 1-85260-323-2.
- Trevena, Arthur (1980). Trains in Trouble: Vol. 1. Redruth: Atlantic Books. ISBN 0-906899-01-X.
- Vaughan, Adrian (1989). Obstruction Danger. Wellingborough: Patrick Stephens Limited. ISBN 1-85260-055-1.
