= Charing Cross tube crash =

Charing Cross tube crash may refer to

- Charing Cross (Northern line) tube crash, in 1938
- Charing Cross (District line) tube crash, also in 1938
