= List of London Underground accidents =

The London Underground network carries more than a billion passengers a year. It has one fatal accident for every 300 million journeys. Five accidents causing passenger deaths have occurred due to train operation in over 90 years since the London Passenger Transport Board was formed, the last being at Moorgate in 1975; other fatalities have been due to wartime and terrorist bombings, station fires and passengers falling on to tracks at stations.

== Up to World War II ==
| Date | Underground line | Location/Station | Incident | Deaths | Injuries |
|---|---|---|---|---|---|
| 10 March 1938 | Northern line | Near Charing Cross (now Embankment) | Two Northern line trains collided between Waterloo and the station, with 12 passengers suffering minor injuries. | | 12 |
| 17 May 1938 | District line | Near Charing Cross (now Embankment) | Main article: Charing Cross (District line) tube crash Two District line trains collided near the station, killing 6. The two accidents coincidentally near the same station but on separate lines were both caused by wrong-side failures of the signals due to signal linesmen's wiring errors. | 6 | |

== World War II ==
| Date | Underground line | Location/Station | Incident | Deaths | Injuries |
|---|---|---|---|---|---|
| 13 October 1940 | Piccadilly line | Bounds Green station | At night a German bomb fell at Bounds Green station killing 16 people. | 16 | |
| 14 October 1940 | Northern line | Road above Balham station | During World War II, a bomb fell in the road above Balham station, with the blast penetrating into the tunnel 9 metres below. The water mains and sewage pipes were broken, causing flooding and the loss of 68 lives – 64 shelterers and 4 railway staff. The station and the tracks between Clapham South and Tooting Bec (then called Trinity Road, Tooting Bec) were closed until January 1941. | 68 | |
| 11 January 1941 | Central line (ticket hall) | Bank station | During World War II the Central line ticket hall of Bank station suffered a direct hit from a German bomb. The roadway collapsed into the subways and station concourse, killing 56 people. | 56 | |
| 3 March 1943 | Central line | Bethnal Green station | Main article: Bethnal Green tube station § Wartime disaster A crowd of people were entering what was to become Bethnal Green station, which was being used at the time as an air-raid shelter. An anti-aircraft battery, a few hundred yards away in Victoria Park, launched a salvo of a new type of anti-aircraft rockets, causing the crowd to surge forward. A woman tripped on the stairs causing many others to fall. Three hundred people were crushed into the stairwell, 173 died at the scene. | 173 | 300 |

== After World War II ==
| Date | Underground line | Location/Station | Incident | Deaths | Injuries |
|---|---|---|---|---|---|
| 31 December 1945 | Metropolitan line | Near Northwood | Two Metropolitan line trains collided in fog on an open-air section near Northwood. The driver of the second train had passed a danger signal under the "Stop and Proceed" rule but did not see the preceding train soon enough to stop. A fire was started by electrical arcing. 3 people were killed. | 3 | 0 |
| 27 July 1946 | Northern line | Edgware tube station | A Northern line train hit the buffers at Edgware. No passengers were killed; the driver died, but it was shown that he had suffered a heart attack at the controls before the collision. It appeared that the dead man's handle had been disabled while the train was still moving. | 1 | 0 |
| 5 December 1946 | Central line | Near to signal post A491, Stratford | Two Central line trains collided in a tunnel section during disruption caused by a signal failure. The line was not yet open for passenger service, but 1 railway employee was killed. | 1 | 3 |
| 8 April 1953 | Central line | Near to signal post A491, Stratford | Main article: Stratford tube crash Two Central line trains collided in a tunnel section during disruption caused by a signal failure, killing 12 people. The location was the same as for the 1946 accident. | 12 | 46 |
| 28 July 1958 | Central line | Between Shepherds Bush station and Holland Park station | A train fire occurred approaching Holland Park station, due to an electrical short circuit in the train causing severe arcing. The train had to be evacuated in the tunnel, but this was delayed because the Rules at the time did not anticipate a fire situation. Almost all passengers and crew suffered from smoke inhalation, and there was a delay in calling ambulances. Forty-eight passengers and three rail crew were taken to hospital, and ten were admitted. One passenger died. | 1 | 51 |
| 11 August 1960 | Central line | Between Redbridge and Gants Hill | A train fire occurred near Redbridge station, due to an electrical short circuit in the train causing severe arcing, exacerbated by a delay in switching off traction current. The train had to be evacuated in the tunnel and passengers and crew suffered from smoke inhalation. There were no fatalities. | 0 | 41 |
| 23 September 1968 | Bakerloo line | Neasden station | A northbound ballast train passed three signals at danger and collided with the rear of a stationary Bakerloo Line passenger train standing in the platform. The driver of the ballast train died before he could be released, an accompanying inspector and the train's guard were taken to hospital and survived. | 1 | |
| 28 February 1975 | Northern City line | Moorgate station | Main article: Moorgate tube crash A southbound Northern City Line train crashed into the tunnel end beyond the platform at Moorgate station. Forty-three people were killed in what was the greatest loss of life on the Underground in peacetime. Seventy-four people were injured. As the driver was one of the initial 43 dead, the cause of the incident was never conclusively determined, and an accidental death verdict was recorded at the official inquest. | 43 | 74 |
| 9 July 1980 | Central line | Holborn station | Main article: Holborn rail crash A Central line train failed to stop in time after passing a signal at danger and being tripped by a train stop. The train hit another train standing in the westbound platform at Holborn. No serious injuries were caused by the accident, and although twenty people were evacuated to hospital, only two stayed overnight. An inquiry concluded that the accident was caused by the motorman of the rear train failing to control his train. | 0 | |
| 20 August 1984 | Central line | Leyton station | Following a signal failure a short distance inside the westbound tunnel between Leyton and Stratford, a train was being used as protection by the technician investigating the fault. The driver of the following train correctly applied the rules at the westbound starting signal at Leyton, but failed to control the speed of the train on the steep downhill gradient and collided with the rear of the stationary train. The driver of the second train was killed and 33 others were injured. | 1 | 33 |
| 23 November 1984 | Victoria line | Oxford Circus station | Main article: Oxford Circus fire A fire raged inside Oxford Circus station. It started at 9.50 p.m. in a materials store and was declared extinguished at 3 a.m. the next day. Fourteen people were treated for smoke inhalation. The probable cause of the fire was smoker's materials being pushed through a ventilation grille into the materials store. This ignited rags or paint thinner within the store. | | 14 |
| 11 December 1984 | Metropolitan line | Kilburn station | A northbound Metropolitan line train incorrectly passed a signal at danger in foggy weather. The driver reset the controls, moved forward, and was killed when the train collided with a stationary train in front. | 1 | |
| 16 October 1986 | Bakerloo line | Kensal Green station | A stationary southbound Bakerloo line train at Kensal Green station was struck in the rear by a Class 313 British Rail service on the Euston to Watford Junction line "The DC line". 23 passengers were injured. The driver of the class 313 passed the protecting stop signal as though it were at caution when it only showed a 'calling on' aspect. The (apparently distracted) driver of the Class 313 observed the train stop lower at the stop signal but failed to notice that the signal had only displayed a calling on aspect. A further protecting repeater signal had been temporarily removed while a retaining wall was being removed but the preceding stop signal had been modified to show a maximum 'caution' aspect for the duration. The accident report criticised the fact that the calling on aspect looked much the same as the yellow 'proceed at caution' aspect but for its position on the signal head. The Euston to Watford Junction line was, at this time, signalled with an experimental system (installed in 1932–3) where a stop signal automatically changed to a calling on aspect after a 70-80 second time delay. The repeater signals, unusually, were able to show green, yellow, or red aspects but were not equipped with train stops. A driver was permitted to pass a red repeater after one minute. Although intended to overcome local signal failures, the more intensive service of the past occasionally produced the spectacle of several trains occupying the same section buffer-to-buffer. Normally, on this system, there were always at least two (and often three) red signals behind any train. Though not unique at the time of installation, the system was the sole example of its type at the time of the collision. The system has since been replaced by a Network Rail standard colour light system, work for which was actually taking place when the accident occurred. | 0 | 23 |
| 18 September 1987 | District line | Richmond station | A District line train of London Underground D stock failed to stop in time at Richmond station. The train hit the buffers and broke an adjacent glass panel. No serious injuries were caused by the accident. Sixteen people were minorly injured. | | 16 |
| 18 November 1987 | - | King's Cross station | Main article: King's Cross fire A large fire broke out in King's Cross St Pancras station. Thirty-one people died, killed by the toxic fumes and extreme heat of the blaze. The fire was the result of a discarded match or cigarette igniting debris, detritus and grease beneath the wooden escalators. As a result of this, the widely ignored smoking ban was more rigorously enforced throughout the system. All of the network's wooden escalators have now been replaced, and other measures have been put in place to help prevent a repeat incident. | 31 | |
| 25 January 2003 | Central line | Chancery Lane | A Central line train of 1992 stock derailed at Chancery Lane, injuring 32 passengers, after a motor became detached from the train. The entire line, and the Waterloo & City line (which also uses 1992 Stock trains), were closed for approximately three months whilst the cause of the failure was determined and appropriate modifications made to the trains. | 0 | 32 |
| 17 October 2003 | Piccadilly line | East of Hammersmith station | The last carriage of a 6-car eastbound Piccadilly line train of 1973 stock derailed east of Hammersmith station. The cause was a broken rail. None of the 70 passengers on board were injured. | 0 | 0 |
| 19 October 2003 | Northern line | Approaching Camden Town station | The last carriage of a 6-car Northern line train of 1995 stock derailed on the approach to Camden Town station. The derailed car hit a wall and the fifth car was partially derailed. Seven passengers were injured, 6 of whom had minor injuries. The other injury was a broken femur. The cause was a poorly designed set of points. The tunnel wall was damaged, and had to be repaired. | 0 | 7 |
| 11 May 2004 | Central line | Approaching White City station | The leading bogie of the 7th car of an 8-car Central line train of 1992 stock derailed on a set of points during the approach to White City station. None of the 150 passengers on board were injured; a normal train service was restored the next day. The cause was found to be in the design of the set of points at locations with specific characteristics and a switch rail that had been replaced the day before the accident. An episode of The Tube contained a segment on the accident and subsequent recovery process. | 0 | 0 |
| 5 July 2007 | Central line | Between Bethnal Green and Mile End stations | Two cars of an eight-car westbound Central line train of 1992 stock derailed at 65 km/h between Bethnal Green and Mile End tube stations. 520 passengers were trapped below ground for two hours, until they were escorted from the derailed train by following one another along the tracks to Mile End tube station. Eight people required hospital treatment and a further thirteen were treated at the scene for minor injuries. Most of the injuries were caused while walking along the uneven surface in the tunnel. The Central line was suspended between Liverpool Street and Leytonstone until the end of the following day as a safety investigation was carried out and the derailed train was rerailed. The investigation found that the derailment was caused by a roll of fire-resistant material being blown onto the tracks from its storage place in a connecting passageway between the two tunnels. The blanket had not been adequately secured, since the workers had not realised how strong were the winds blowing through the passage. | 0 | 21 |
| 13 August 2010 | Northern line | Archway station to Warren Street station | At around 07:00, a broken-down maintenance wagon on the Northern line became uncoupled from the locomotive that was towing it, allowing it to roll southwards from Archway station. The runaway train reached a maximum speed of 30 mph and passed through all stops until Warren Street station where an uphill gradient caused it to come to rest. Trains ahead of the runaway were directed by the Controller to run non-stop through several stations to avoid a potential collision, with drivers instructing passengers to move towards the front of the train, and some were diverted to a different branch. On 28 February 2013, London Underground, Tube Lines and the German company Schweerbau were each fined £100,000 at the Old Bailey for health and safety breaches. | | |
| 3 February 2014 | Piccadilly line | Holborn station | At 19:00, a passenger was hospitalised after being dragged along the platform by a departing Piccadilly line train after the end of her scarf was caught in a closing door. | 0 | 1 |
| 2 March 2016 | District line | Just outside of Ealing Broadway station | A District line train derailed just outside Ealing Broadway station due to a set of points set incorrectly. There were no injuries. | 0 | 0 |
| 26 May 2020 | Bakerloo line | Waterloo station | At 10:10 a passenger fell into the gap between the platform and the northbound Bakerloo train from which he had just alighted. The passenger was unable to free himself, was paralysed by the departing train and crushed by the next train, dying as a result of his injuries. The incident was caused by the curvature of the track where the passenger alighted creating a large gap between the train and the platform. | 1 | 0 |
| 1 April to 25 June 2022 (exact date unknown) | Piccadilly line | Unknown | According to Transport for London's quarterly health and safety report in 2022, a customer’s head was crushed by a Piccadilly line train, while they urinated between two train carriages of the train, which was in motion at the time. | 0 | 1 |
| 22 August 2022 | Piccadilly line | Near Park Royal tube station | At 03:38 BST a car driver, travelling at 110 mph (177 km/h) on the A40, lost control of his vehicle which ended up on the railway track near Park Royal tube station. One passenger was killed, the driver, another passenger in the car and a bystander were injured. Car driver received seven-and-a-half-year jail sentence after admitting causing death and serious injury by dangerous driving. | 1 | 3 |
| 30 September 2022 | Northern line | High Barnet station | On the night of 30 September 2022, Sarah de Lagarde fell asleep on a northbound Northern line, missed getting off at Camden Town, and did not wake up until the train terminated at High Barnet. Disorientated, she slipped on the wet platform and fell through the gap between cars. She was then run over by the departing train, as well as a subsequent incoming one, in the process of which she lost her right arm and right leg. A TfL report concluded that, "This was a [series] of unfortunate and unique events that resulted in the [injured person] sustaining life-changing injuries," and the Office of Rail and Road, British Transport Police, and the Rail Accident Investigation Branch concluded no further investigation was needed. De Lagarde now has PTSD as a result of the incident and in 2023, told LBC that she could no longer travel by Tube. In February 2024 she launched a High Court Personal injury claim against TfL. | 0 | 1 |
| 18 February 2023 | Northern line | Archway station | At approximately 15:50 GMT, a passenger's coat became trapped in the doors of a Northern line train at Archway station, causing them to be dragged about 2 metres, before their coat was dislodged from the door. The passenger and another person fell to the ground, causing the passenger to suffer 'serious injuries'. | 0 | 1 |
| 20 April 2023 | Northern line | Chalk Farm station | At approximately 23:00 GMT, a passenger's coat became trapped in the doors of a Northern line train at Chalk Farm station before their coat was dislodged from the doors. This caused the passenger to be dragged for 20 metres and suffer 'minor injuries'. | 0 | 1 |
| 25 May 2023 | Northern line | Clapham Common station | At approximately 17:50 BST, passengers onboard a Northern line train smashed the windows of the train to escape after experiencing smoke and a burning smell inside the carriages from overheated material on the brake resistor grid. The train had just left the station and 2 of the 6 cars were in the tunnel with the remaining 4 still in the station. Transport for London (TfL) later apologised for the 'distress caused at Clapham Common'. RIAB report indicated passengers received no information and the train doors were not opened for around four and a half minutes after the train came to a stand. Andrew Hall, Chief Inspector of Rail Accidents, commented that the "RAIB investigated a similar incident at Holland Park in 2013 and for a number of years that incident was used as an example to train staff about how to respond to such out-of-course events. However, it was subsequently removed from the training syllabus and since then knowledge of the lessons learnt may well have begun to fade." | 0 | 0 |
| 26 December 2023 | Jubilee line | Stratford tube station | At approximately 14:45 GMT, a passenger fell from the platform of Stratford tube station and onto the tracks. They were later discovered on the tracks by Underground staff, but had died, potentially having been struck by 'a number of trains'. It was reported on 24 January 2024, that the Rail Accident Investigation Branch (RAIB) were investigating the incident. | 1 | 0 |

== See also ==
- Attacks on the London Underground
