= Sydenham rail disaster =

1953 railway incident in Australia

Coordinates: 33°54′48″S 151°10′06″E

Details
- Date: 19 December 1953
- Location: Sydenham, New South Wales
- Country: Australia
- Line: Illawarra
- Operator: New South Wales Government Railways
- Incident type: Collision
- Cause: Wrong-side failure

Statistics
- Trains: 2
- Deaths: 5
- Injured: 748

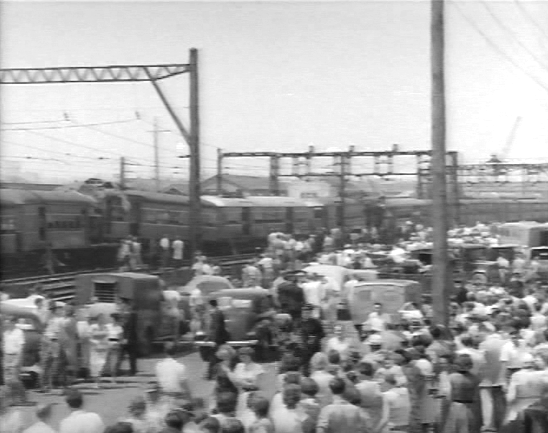
Sydenham Rail Disaster 1953

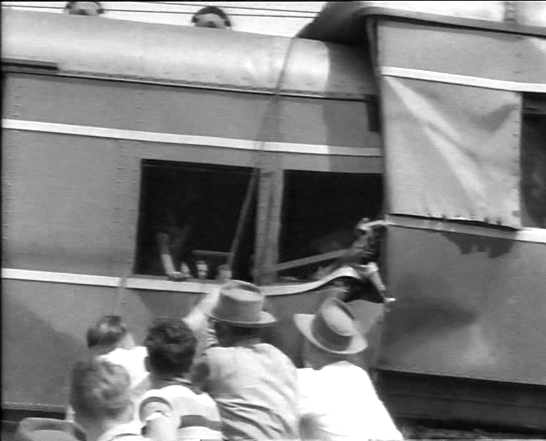
Sydenham Rail Disaster 1953

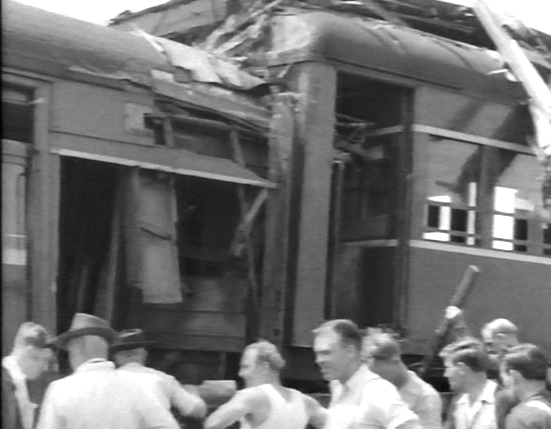
Sydenham Rail Disaster 1953

On 19 December 1953, a New South Wales Government Railways electric passenger train travelling to Bankstown ran into the rear of another electric train travelling to East Hills at Sydenham. Five people were killed and 748 injured. A wrong-side failure of the signalling system, as a result of human intervention, was believed to be the cause.

== The crash ==
Two suburban passenger trains, the first travelling to East Hills the following train travelling to Bankstown, collided at about 12:30pm. The Bankstown train was travelling at 30 to 35 miles per hour (48 to 56 km/h) a few seconds before the crash. Both trains were crowded, each with around 1200 passengers, many travelling home after work (it being a Saturday), and Christmas shoppers. The East Hills train was being held at a home signal just on the Sydney side of Sydenham Junction station. The two leading cars of the Bankstown train telescoped into the two trailing cars of the East Hills train.

== Synopsis ==
Signals behind the East Hills train should have been showing stop to protect the train, it was established that the signals were in fact showing proceed giving the following train the belief that the line ahead was clear. In the accident, a signal electrician was attending a failure of a track circuit. To help keep the trains moving, he manipulated the track circuit relay with a screwdriver. Distracted by a telephone call, he forgot to remove the screwdriver to drop the track circuit relay when the section became occupied by a train, allowing a second train to see green signals and collide with the first.

The driver of the second train (the Bankstown train) was charged with manslaughter, accused of being under the influence of alcohol. He was later acquitted of the charge by a jury. A Signals Electrician was also charged with manslaughter for his part in the incident.

== Aftermath ==
Since that time, training and procedures for signal electricians have been strengthened and it is clearly stated in railway rules that in the event of a track circuit failure, no attempt shall be made to clear any of the signals controlled by the track circuit by manipulation of the track circuit relay...

Two carriages of the East Hills train (the second and sixth) were older wooden bodied carriages and it was claimed this may have contributed to the deaths and injuries, although the Bankstown train, a fully steel carriage train, suffered more damage.
