= Joseph Milner (firefighter) =

British firefighter

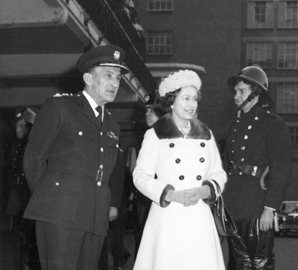
Milner (left) with Queen Elizabeth II during a visit to London Fire Brigade Headquarters in 1974

Joseph Milner, CBE, QFSM (October 1922 – 13 January 2007) was a senior officer in the British fire service.

== Career ==
Milner was born in October 1922 in Manchester, England. On leaving the army in 1946, he began his career with the Fire Brigades of Middlesbrough, Scarborough, and the North Riding of Yorkshire. He joined the Hong Kong Fire Services in 1951. In the 1962 Queen's Birthday Honours, was awarded the Queen's Fire Service Medal for Distinguished Service (QFSM) in reconotin of his work as deputy director of the Hong Kong Fire Brigade.

He was Director of the Hong Kong Fire Services from 1965 to 1970 and Chief Fire Officer, of the London Fire Brigade from 1970 to 1976. In the 1975 New Year Honours, he was appointed Commander of the Order of the British Empire (CBE). As the Chief Fire Officer, he was present during the aftermath of the Moorgate tube crash that occurred on occurred on 28 February 1975. He famously quoted 'my thousand selfless heroes', in dedication to the literal 1000 firefighters who spent 5 days rescuing survivors. He retired from the fire brigade in 1976.

He died on 13 January 2007 in Caston, Norfolk, England.

== Family ==
1st wife Bella Grice-Flinton, (born,Staxton, North Yorkshire, died 1976) – had 2 children (Patricia and Frederick (dec'd)), 2nd wife Anne Milner – married 1976 until his death in 2007- no children, Joyce Woodhouse – sister, William Milner – brother, Henry Milner, QPM-awarded British policeman, was his brother.

== Burma Campaign ==
Milner fought in the Burma campaign as a Chindit. There is a story that has been passed down through the family of Milner, that when the Japanese surrounded his camp, and his men nervously asked him what they should do, he gave the orders to set up a banquet in order to show the Japanese that they did not fear them. Joseph Milner wrote a fictional, book based on his experiences called "To Blazes With Glory: A Chindit's war", about a soldier called Badger who fights in the campaign.
