= Turenne rail accident =

1932 Rail accident in Algeria

Coordinates: 34°49′42″N 1°28′50″W

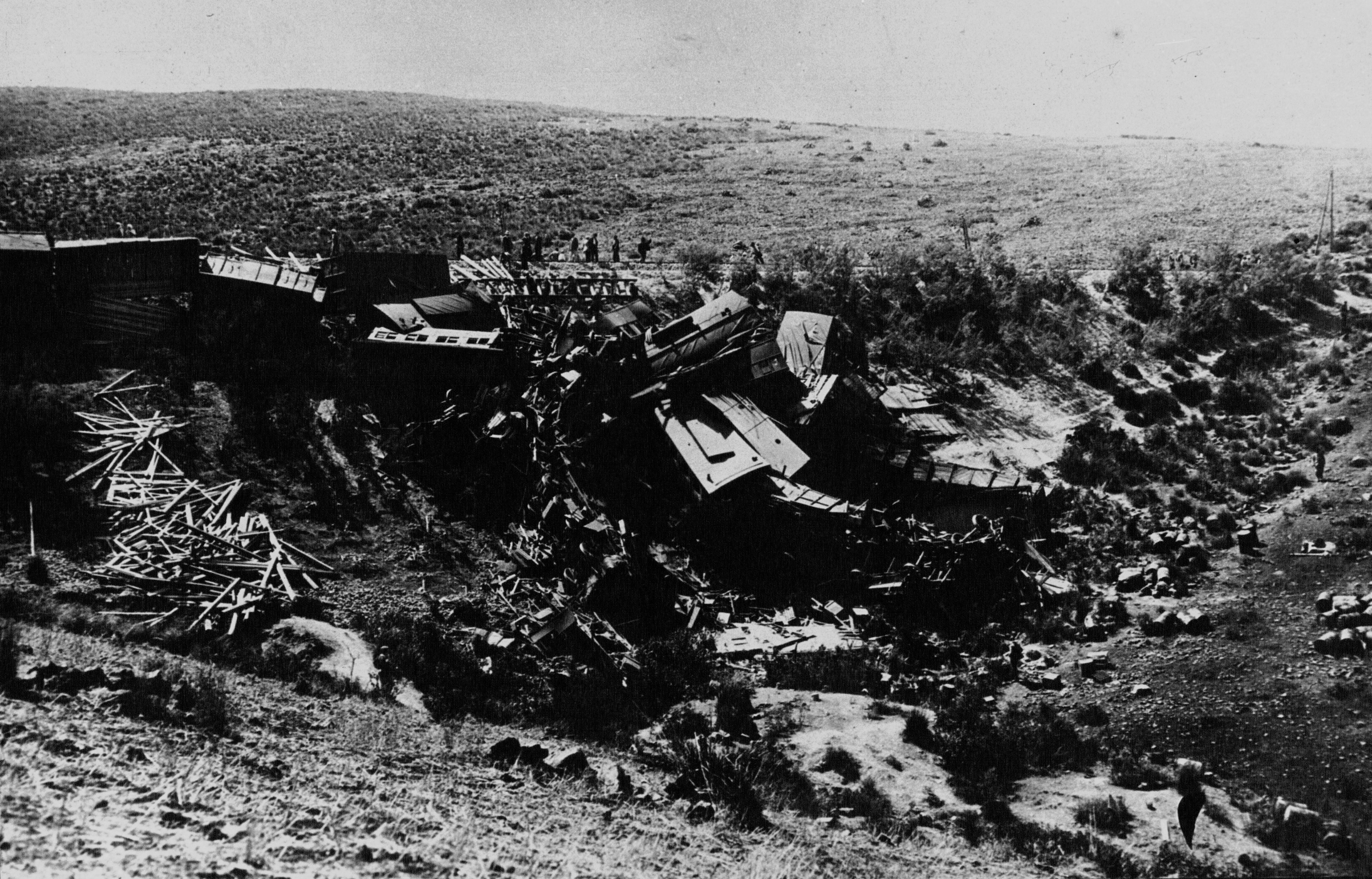
- Photograph of the accident.

Details
- Date: 14 September 1932; 14:40
- Location: Tlemcen Province
- Country: Algeria
- Line: Sidi Bel Abbès to Oujda
- Operator: French Foreign Legion
- Incident type: Derailment
- Cause: undermined track

Statistics
- Trains: 1
- Passengers: 500
- Deaths: 62
- Injured: 223

The Turenne rail accident occurred on 14 September 1932 when a train carrying French Foreign Legionnaires crashed in Algeria killing 62 people.

The military train carrying 500 soldiers departed Sidi Bel Abbès at 07:15 that morning bound for Oujda in Morocco. In the mountainous Tlemcen Province between Zelboun and Turenne (now called Sabra) it derailed, the engine and all 14 carriages fell 250 feet into a ravine killing 57 soldiers and 5 train crew; 223 men were injured. The population of Turenne helped in the initial rescue work until a relief train arrived. The injured were taken by train to Tlemcen but it was not until the following night that all the survivors were extricated. An investigation revealed the trackbed to be loose and undermined by recent heavy rainfall. Many Legionnaires managed to jump from the rear carriages to safety when they saw those carriages ahead plunging off the rails.

A 12-metre-high (39 ft) monument has been erected near the site of the disaster, topped by a grenade, the symbol of the French Foreign Legion.

== Sources ==
- Railroad Wrecks by Edgar A. Haine, page 143, publ. 1993 ISBN 0-8453-4844-2
