= 1937 Dominguez Canyon rail crash =

Train crash in Colorado, United States

Coordinates: 38°47′14.34″N 108°18′19.02″W

Dominguez Canyon rail crash

Details
- Date: April 26, 1937; 89 years ago 08:00pm
- Location: Near Dominguez Canyon, Colorado, USA
- Country: USA
- Line: Delta to Grand Junction
- Operator: D&RGW
- Incident type: Canyon plunge
- Cause: burnt out bridge

Statistics
- Trains: 1
- Passengers: 2 passenger cars (unknown number of passengers)
- Deaths: 2
- Injured: 7

The Dominguez Canyon rail crash, also known as the Wells Gulch rail crash, was a train crash in Colorado in 1937 that killed the engineer (Charles Freeman) and the fireman.

The crash occurred on April 26, 1937, as the train was traveling Northwestward from Delta, Colorado to Grand Junction, Colorado, on the D&RGW tracks, near Dominguez Canyon. The trestle had burned out earlier that same day, leaving the rails hanging unsupported over Wells Gulch. Due to the darkness, the engineer was not able to see the danger ahead until it was too late. Earlier that same day, the same engine and crew had passed over the same location westbound, and at that time the trestle crossing was in good condition.

The official inquiry ruled that the crash was an accident due to the burned-out bridge. Both members of the engine crew were killed and seven were injured including five passengers, as well as the railway clerk and express manager, but none seriously.

== Sequence of events ==
On April 26, 1937, the D&RGW train number 319 had left Delta at 7:25pm heading Northwest to Grand Junction, Colorado. About 35 minutes later, when it was about 17.1 miles from Delta and traveling along the tracks next to the Gunnison River, it crashed into Wells Gulch near Dominguez Canyon. The train had attempted to cross over the gulch without realizing the trestle had burnt out sometime earlier that same day. Due to the time of the accident, at 8pm, the engineer had no indication whatsoever of the condition and didn't even have time to apply the brakes. The train, which consisted of the coal-powered steam engine #777, plus a combination mail and baggage car, an additional baggage car, one coach and one Pullman sleeping car, was traveling at about 25-30 mph and was derailed as it crossed over the south end of Wells Gulch at bridge 389.60. The trestle supporting the tracks had been destroyed by fire sometime in the previous twelve hours. The last train to cross over the same spot, had been the same train and crew at about 7:40am the morning of the crash.

The investigation that followed the crash was unable to determine the cause of the fire, but two possible theories were mentioned, but no facts to support either were presented, so the crash was ruled an accident.

The fireman, Fred S. Perkins, who had worked for the D&RGW since 1898, was killed instantly. The engineer, Charles D. Freeman, who had worked for the D&RGW since 1903, suffered extensive burns from the escaping steam, and died the following day at St. Mary's Hospital, in Grand Junction.

The locomotive pulling the train, T-29 class 4-6-0 Ten-wheeler #777 (built by Brooks Locomotive Works in 1908) was later scrapped in October 1938.

== Causes ==
The immediate cause of the accident was the burned out trestle that left the rails unsupported as they crossed over Wells Gulch, near Domniguez Canyon.

== Recommendations ==
No known recommendations were made.
