= Wrong-side failure =

Dangerous failure of railway signalling equipment

A wrong-side failure describes a failure condition in a piece of railway signalling equipment that results in an unsafe state. A typical example would be a signal showing a 'proceed' aspect (e.g. green) when it should be showing a 'stop' or 'danger' aspect, resulting in a "false clear". (The converse is a right-side failure, where even with any reduction the resulting state is safe overall.)

== Example of how a wrong-side failure may occur ==
Consider a relay that has to energize to show a green light.

If a wire breaks, or the battery is drained, then the relay will de-energize and the signal will show a red light, which is fail-safe.

If a stray wire from another circuit touches the wire connected to that same relay, then that would be a wrong side failure, which is potentially dangerous. This stray wire can be guarded against by ensuring that the insulation on the relay wire is of good quality, and that all terminals are locked away.

In addition, the relay may be double-switched, also known as double-cut, that is to say that it only energizes if a positive circuit and a negative circuit are both complete. That would then require two stray wires to cause a wrong-side failure, which is much less likely than a single stray wire.

== Accidents ==
While accidents from the problem are rare, they do occur:

- 1876 – Abbots Ripton rail disaster (England) – signals frozen by blizzard in 'clear' position (signal arm hidden in a slot in the post).
- 1915 – Rockledge, Tennessee – Relocation of a Western Union telegraph line from old alignment to new alignment causes a false clear signal indication when the Western Union wire comes in contact with the signal wire for the automatic block signal at the south end of the siding at Rockledge. A southbound freight train departed Rockledge on the false clear indication and collided with a northbound passenger train that had entered the block at Tantallon on a proper clear indication two minutes before the freight train departed Rockledge. A contributing factor was that the tower operator at Rockledge only controlled the signals, the track switches being operated by the train crews themselves.
- 1927 – Marrar (NSW, Australia) – lightning damage meant that the single line train tablet system incorrectly released two tablets simultaneously putting two trains on a collision course; fortunately they saw each other and were able to stop in time.
- 1938 – Charing Cross (Northern line) tube crash (London) – signal linesman rewires a faulty signal incorrectly, so that it shows green too soon; two Underground trains collide as a result, injuring twelve. Also Charing Cross (District line) tube crash, signal linesman makes wiring error in cabin, two Underground trains collide, killing six.
- 1953 – Sydenham Rail Disaster (NSW, Australia) – five killed
- 1976 – Glenbrook, New South Wales (Australia) Automatic signal in rear of a stationary EMU at "caution" when it should have been at "danger". Following goods train enters occupied signal section and collides with EMU; 1 passenger killed. Cause attributable to deteriorated wiring which allowed a false feed.
- 1979 – Invergowrie rail crash (Scotland) – signal was at "wrong" (i.e. indistinct indication) yet taken by driver to be a 'proceed' signal.
- 1988 – Clapham Junction rail crash (London) – single stray wire causes false green signal and collision killing 35.
- 1990 – Cowan rail disaster (NSW, Australia), which occurred when sand on the rails insulated the wheels from the rails, causing a failure to shunt that allowed a trailing block signal to improperly display a clear aspect, resulting in a rear-end collision.
- 2005 – Deelfontein (South Africa) – solder splatter bridges a relay contact. Most testing is done with the relays unplugged which would not detect the splatter, while the solder splatter is likely to lead to a difficult to trace phantom problem.
- 2009 – On March 26, two trains collided near Arévalo, Spain while engineers were testing a new signalling system. Lack of safeguards and testing on an active line led to the collision of two freight trains. One of the train drivers died.
- 2009 – Ft Totten crash Washington DC Metro (WMATA). An inbound Red Line train stopped short of Ft. Totten station; the following train failed to stop and impacted at about 42 mph (68 km/h). Nine dead, 80 injured. Preliminary NTSB reports were that the AC track circuit transmitter was breaking into parasitic oscillation, and that coupled across the rack cabinet to the receiver.
- 2020 – On the Italian high speed rail network, maintenance workers during the night left a faulty point to the reverse position, but disconnected its network connection and its link to the safety signalling system (ETCS L2); the first morning high speed train received a green signal to proceed at full speed and hit the point at 181 mph (291 km/h), resulting in the Livraga derailment which killed 2 and injured 31.
- 2024 - 2024 Cicalengka railway collision. An uncommanded signal displaying a false clear aspect due to aging hardware causes two trains to collide near Cicalengka Station in Bandung Regency, Indonesia, killing four rail employees and injuring 42 others.

== False alarms ==
Railway authorities usually give the drivers and signalmen the benefit of the doubt and investigate whether a wrong-side failure is the cause of an accident. This occurred with the Hinton train collision, but investigations soon showed that a wrong-side failure was not the cause.

The 2008 Chatsworth train collision was determined to be human error, not wrong-side failure as a few initially said.

== Wrong-side failures to be reported ==
In the United States there is a rule that wrong-side failures are to be reported to the Federal Railroad Administration.

== See also ==
- Lists of rail accidents
