= Piston effect =

Forced-air flow inside a tunnel caused by moving vehicles

Piston effect refers to the forced-air flow inside a tunnel or shaft caused by moving vehicles. It is one of numerous phenomena that engineers and designers must consider when developing a range of structures.

== Cause ==
A diagram showing the piston effect as a vehicle moves through a tunnel.

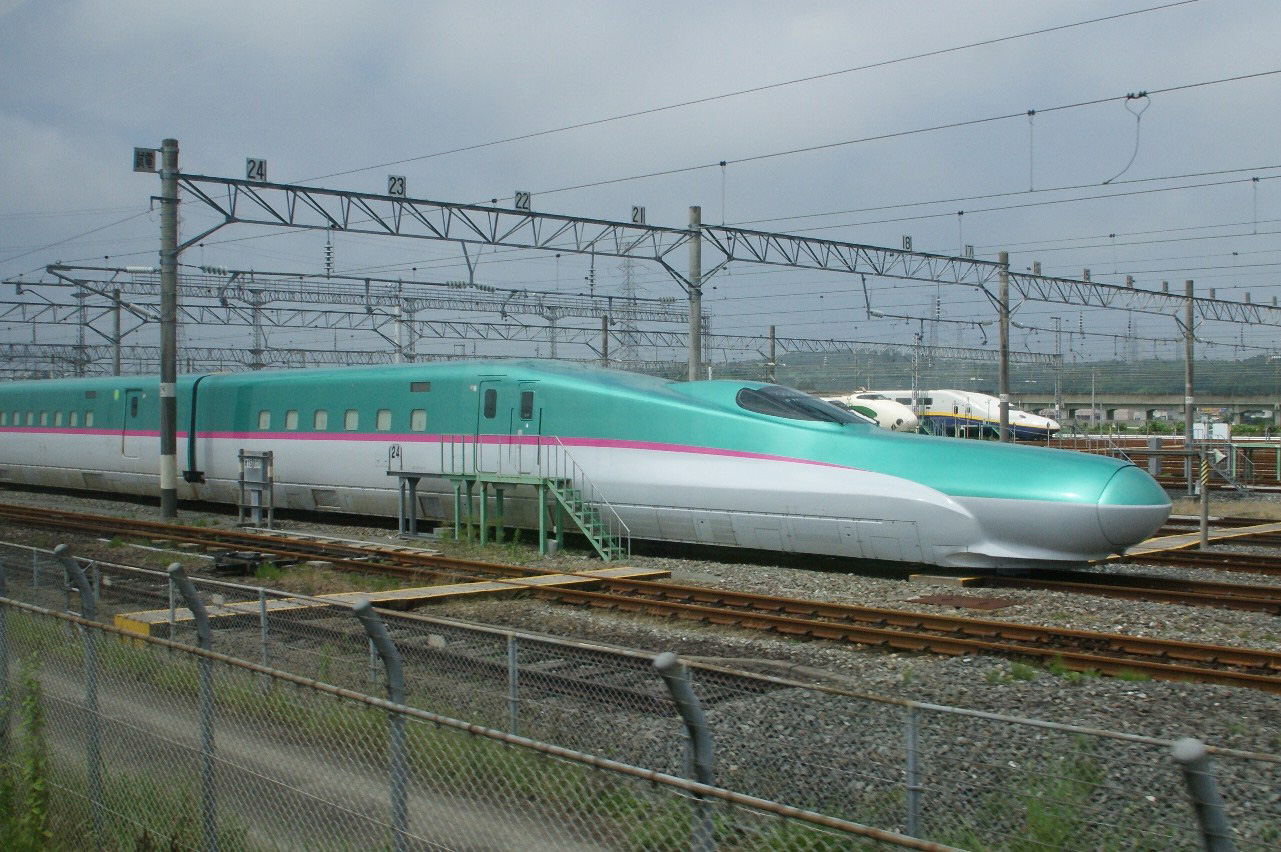
The elongated nose of the E5 Series Shinkansen in Japan is designed to counter the piston effect.

In open air, when a vehicle travels along, air pushed aside can move in any direction except into the ground. Inside a tunnel, air is confined by the tunnel walls to move along the tunnel. Behind the moving vehicle, as air has been pushed away, suction is created, and air is pulled to flow into the tunnel. In addition, because of fluid viscosity, the surface of the vehicle drags the air to flow with vehicle, a force experienced as skin drag by the vehicle. This movement of air by the vehicle is analogous to the operation of a mechanical piston as inside a reciprocating compressor gas pump, hence the name "piston effect". The effect is also similar to the pressure fluctuations inside drainage pipes as waste water pushes air in front of it.

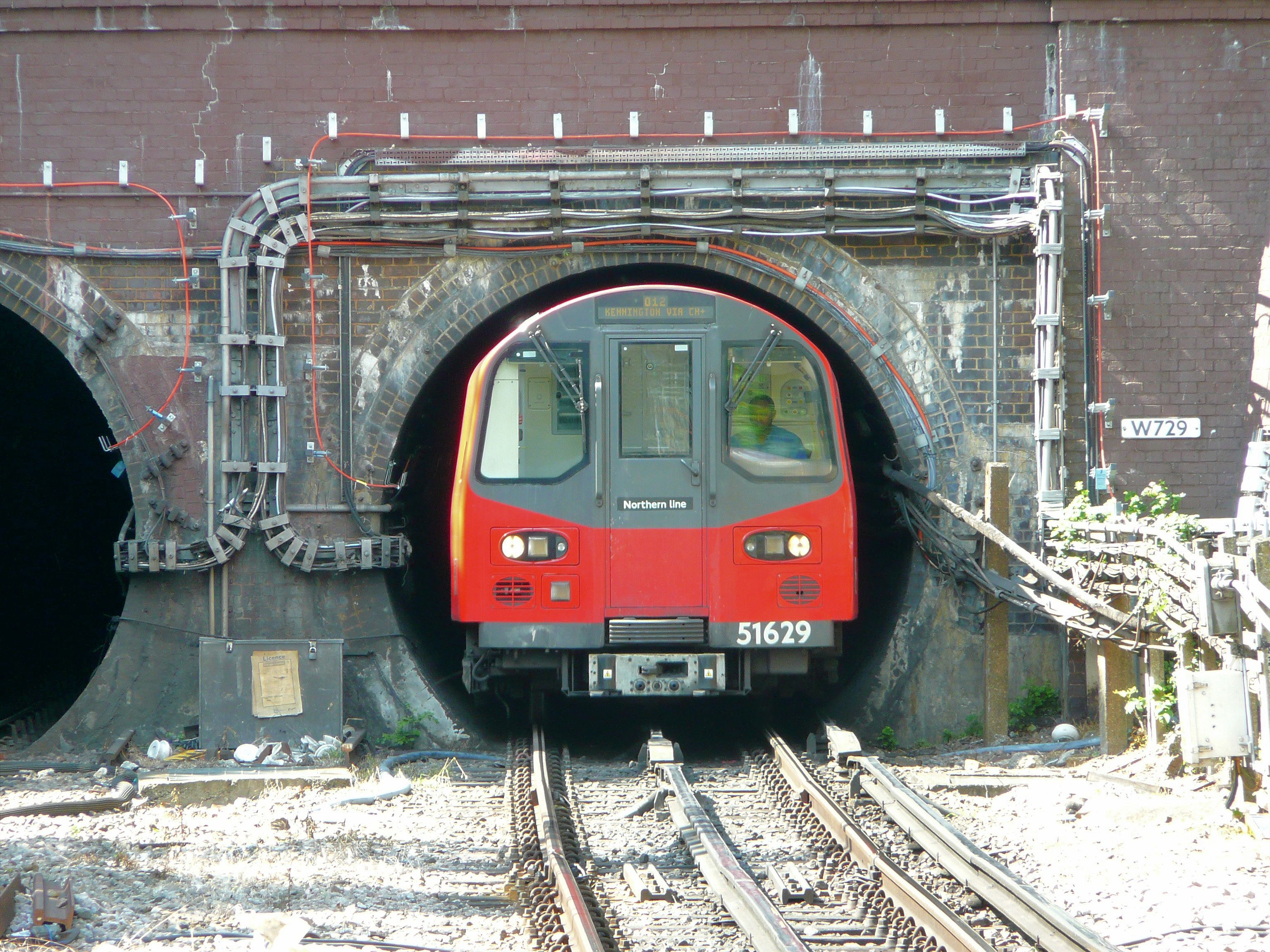
The clearance between train and tunnel is often small. London Underground train exiting a tunnel.

The piston effect is very pronounced in railway tunnels, because the cross sectional area of trains is large and in many cases almost completely fills the tunnel cross section. The wind felt by the passengers on underground railway platforms (that do not have platform screen doors installed) when a train is approaching is air flow from the piston effect. The effect is less pronounced in road vehicle tunnels, as the cross-sectional area of vehicle is small compared to the total cross-sectional area of the tunnel. Single track tunnels experience the maximum effect but clearance between rolling stock and the tunnel as well as the shape of the front of the train affect its strength.

Air flow caused by the piston effect can exert large forces on the installations inside the tunnel and so these installations have to be carefully designed and installed properly. Non-return dampers are sometimes needed to prevent stalling of ventilation fans caused by this air flow.

== Applications ==
The piston effect has to be considered by building designers in relation to smoke movement within an elevator shaft. A moving elevator car forces the air in front of it out of the shaft and pulls air into the shaft behind it with the effect most apparent in elevator systems with a fast moving car in a single shaft. This means that in a fire a moving elevator may push smoke into lower floors.

The piston effect is used in tunnel ventilation. In railway tunnels, the train pushes out the air in front of it toward the closest ventilation shaft in front, and sucks air into the tunnel from the closest ventilation shaft behind it. The piston effect can also assist ventilation in road vehicle tunnels.

In underground rapid transit systems, the piston effect contributes to ventilation and in some cases provides enough air movement to make mechanical ventilation unnecessary. At wider stations with multiple tracks, air quality remains the same and can even improve when mechanical ventilation is disabled. At narrow platforms with a single tunnel, however, air quality worsens when relying on the piston effect alone for ventilation. This still allows for potential energy savings by taking advantage of the piston effect rather than mechanical ventilation where possible.

== Tunnel boom ==
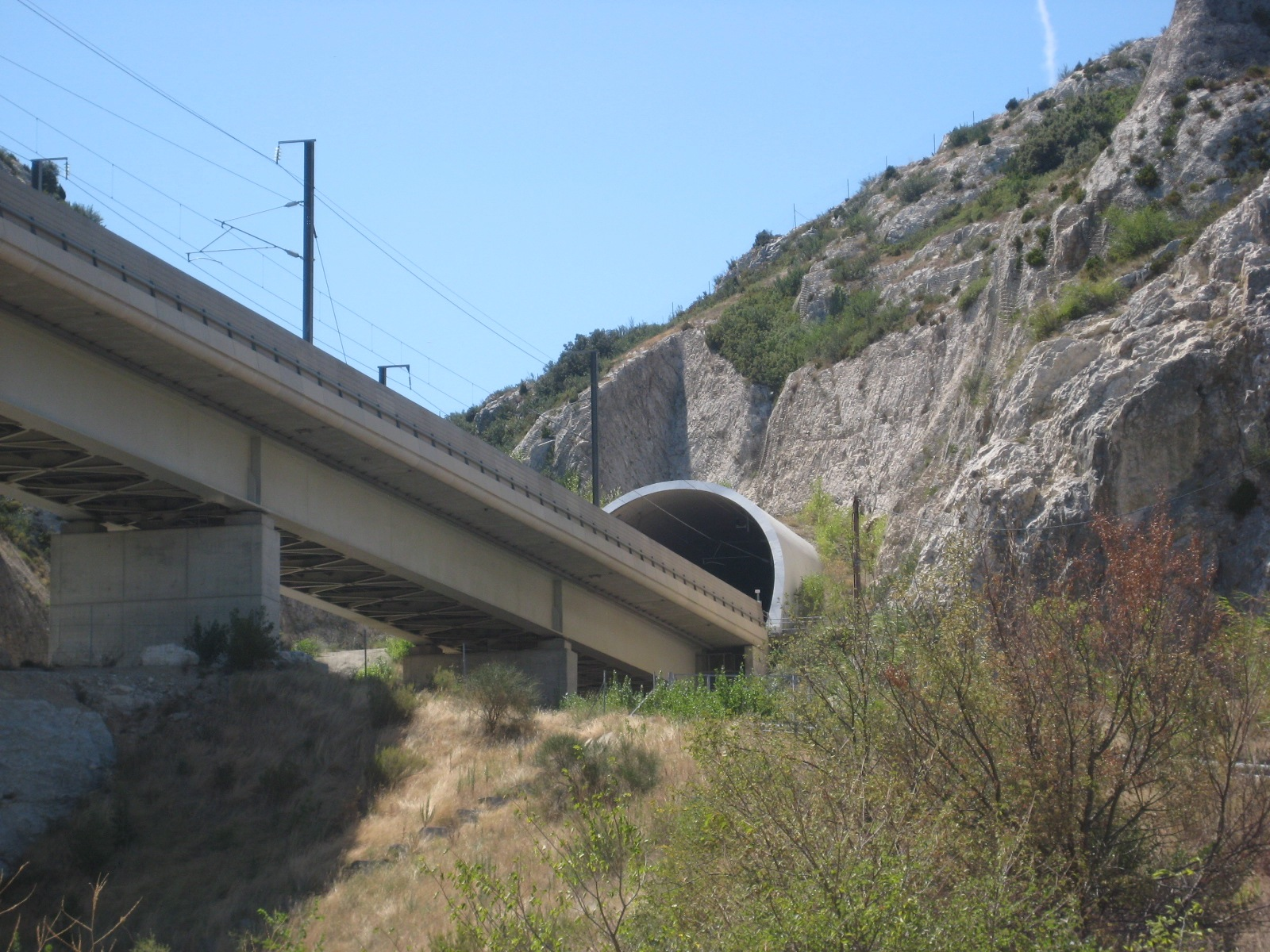
A tunnel in the French high-speed TGV network with an entrance hood to mitigate tunnel boom.

Tunnel boom is a loud boom sometimes generated by high-speed trains when they exit tunnels. These shock waves can disturb nearby residents and damage trains and nearby structures. People perceive this sound similarly to that of a sonic boom from supersonic aircraft. However, unlike a sonic boom, tunnel boom is not caused by trains exceeding the speed of sound. Instead, tunnel boom results from the structure of the tunnel preventing the air around the train from escaping in all directions. As a train passes through a tunnel, it creates compression waves in front of it. These waves coalesce into a shock wave that generates a loud boom when it reaches the tunnel exit. The strength of this wave is proportional to the cube of the train's speed, so the effect is much more pronounced with faster trains.

Tunnel boom can disturb residents near the mouths of tunnels, and it is exacerbated in mountain valleys where the sound echoes. Reducing these disturbances is a significant challenge for high-speed lines such as Japan's Shinkansen, France's TGV and Spain's AVE. Tunnel boom has become a principal limitation to increased train speeds in Japan where the mountainous terrain requires frequent tunnels. Japan has enacted a law limiting noise to 70 dB in residential areas, which include many tunnel exit zones.

Methods of reducing tunnel boom include making the train's profile highly aerodynamic, adding hoods to tunnel entrances, installing perforated walls at tunnel exits, and drilling vent holes in the tunnel (similar to fitting a silencer on a firearm, but on a far bigger scale). The HS2 project in the United Kingdom has developed "porous portal" tunnel hoods to mitigate tunnel boom for residents, as well as minimising aural discomfort for passengers that could arise from in-train air pressure changes.

== Ear discomfort ==
Passengers and crew may experience ear discomfort as a train enters a tunnel because of rapid pressure changes.

== See also ==
- Plumbing drainage venting
