= Charing Cross (District line) tube crash =

Railway accident in 1938

Charing Cross (District Line) tube crash

Details
- Date: 17 May 1938; 09:55
- Location: between Charing Cross and Temple stations.
- Country: United Kingdom
- Line: District line
- Operator: London Passenger Transport Board
- Incident type: rear-end collision
- Cause: Wrong-side failure caused by inadequate maintenance.

Statistics
- Trains: 2
- Deaths: 6
- Injured: 46

The Charing Cross (District line) tube crash occurred on 17 May 1938 at about 09:55 hours, between Charing Cross (now Embankment) and Temple stations. Six people were killed when a Circle line service ran into the rear of a District line service held at an automatic signal. A wiring error had caused the preceding signal to incorrectly display a green aspect. By chance a registered nurse, Phyllis Newton from Leicestershire, was on the train, and despite her own injuries she worked on the victims for over two hours before being taken to hospital.

== Preliminary events ==
The track circuits connected to the signal cabin at Charing Cross had been converted to alternating current on the morning of 8 May. As a result, there was some wiring which needed to be secured. This work was carried out during the engineering hours on 17 May.

== Signal fault ==
The signal wiring engineer had secured and reconnected all wires between the various circuit breakers in the cabin. However, one wire, which linked circuit breaker number 8 to circuit breaker number 9 had been put on the wrong terminal of circuit breaker number 9. This caused signal EH9, the eastbound starter signal, to clear even though the section ahead was occupied by a train held at automatic signal number 823.

The cabin was put into automatic mode as this was how it was normally set, but no testing was carried out, and traffic began with no observation from the engineers. Manual working was only used when a train was to be reversed at Charing Cross.

== Problem reported ==
The problem did not appear until the line became busy. On arrival at Temple at 09:40, a motorman reported that he had nearly run into the train ahead.

The message was conveyed to Charing Cross but no action was taken despite further reports that the signal was working incorrectly. By the time it became clear that there was a significant problem, it was too late to prevent the collision.

== Allocation of blame ==
The Ministry of Transport report held the Signal Installer and Chief Lineman responsible for the wiring error and the failure to test the signals thoroughly. The Station Foreman, Porter and Inspector were responsible for not acting promptly to prevent a collision.

== Similar accident ==
A similar accident involving a signal wiring error had occurred near the same station on the Northern line on 10 March 1938. These wrong-side failures are extremely rare and it was a remarkable coincidence for two such failures to occur in the same year near the same station, albeit on different lines.
