= Charing Cross (Northern line) tube crash =

1938 train disaster in London, England

The Charing Cross (Northern line) tube crash occurred at 08:32 hours on 10 March 1938, when a Northern line train ran into the rear of a stationary train near Charing Cross (now Embankment) in London. Twelve people were slightly injured. The accident was caused by a signal technician carrying out a temporary repair to a faulty signal even though he was not familiar with the layout and did not have access to the signalling diagram.

== Signal fault ==
During the morning rush hour, the advanced platform starter signal on the northbound line at Waterloo station had developed an intermittent right side fault which sometimes caused it to show 'danger' even though the line ahead was clear. This was causing significant delay to the service because drivers were having to carry out the 'stop and proceed' rule which required them to wait one minute, pass the signal and then proceed slowly with caution as far as the next signal. The signal lineman for the area was unavailable and so one was summoned from Kennington station. When he arrived, he gave instructions for the platform staff to hold the next train even if the signal turned green, and then he and the Stationmaster entered the tunnel to look for the fault.

== Collision ==
He quickly found a faulty signalling relay, which although it was energised had a voltage across a front contact (a contact that is made when the relay is energised). As a temporary measure to get the trains moving, he shorted out the contact with a piece of wire terminated in two crocodile clips. This cut the relay out of action and reduced the clearing distance of the signal. The lineman knew this but did not expect it to incur a significant risk as the track circuit for a starter signal is only short. Because he only had a wiring schematic and not a signalling diagram he didn't appreciate that the starter signal was 'slotted' to four other track circuits, and was only supposed to clear once all those sections of line ahead were unoccupied. The effect of his actions meant that the signal would now revert to clear once a train had passed it by just 33 yards, rather than the 615 yards it was designed to. When he returned to the station he stood by the tunnel headwall with a red hand lamp and held every train for one minute after the signal turned green as a precautionary measure. After several trains had passed he went in search of a second wire with the intention of temporarily connecting the faulty signal's circuit to an unused pair of contacts on the same relay, to restore normal operation. While he was searching the collision took place just beyond Charing Cross station.

== Inquiry ==
In the inquiry, the signal engineer was held wholly to blame, because although his temporary fix was reasonable under the circumstances, the instructions that he gave to the platform staff were incorrect. The holding of the train for one minute after the green aspect was reasonable, but the driver should have been instructed to, "... proceed at caution and be prepared to stop short of any obstruction". The absence of the last instruction meant that the driver would proceed at full speed and be unable to stop short of another train.

== Safety improvement ==
As a result, the berth circuit (not to be confused with the berth track circuit) was developed whose purpose was to detect contacts that were closed when they shouldn't have been and to rupture the relay supply fuse if such a condition was detected forcing the controlled signals to show an unchanging danger indication. The berth circuit was retrofitted to every automatic signalling system in Britain.
