= List of rail accidents in Italy =

This is a list of the most serious rail-related accidents (excluding intentional acts) that occurred in Italy.

== 20th century ==
=== 1940s ===
- The 1944 Balvano train disaster was the deadliest railway accident in Italian history and one of the worst railway disasters ever. It occurred on the night of March 2, 1944 in Balvano, Basilicata. Over 500 people in a steam-hauled, coal-burning freight train (mostly stowaways) died of carbon monoxide poisoning during a protracted stall in a tunnel.

=== 1950s ===
- In 1957, the Codogno rail crash killed 15 people and injured at least 30 more.

=== 1960s ===
- The 1961 Fiumarella rail disaster was one of the deadliest incidents in the history of the Italian railways. It occurred at about 7.45 am on 23 December 1961, at the Fiumarella viaduct, near Catanzaro, in the region of Calabria, southern Italy. The accident occurred as the train was passing over the curved Fiumarella viaduct, about an hour after departing from Soveria Mannelli for Catanzaro at 6:43 am. The trailer derailed from the track, due to the rupture of the tram type draw hook, and plunged into the river below after a falling about 40 m (131 ft). Inside the trailer there were 99 passengers, many of them students. Seventy-one of them died on impact, and 28 others were injured to varying degrees. This was the worst rail disaster in peacetime Italy.
- The 1962 Castel Bolognese train disaster occurred on March 8, 1962, in the Castel Bolognese railway station, near Ravenna, in Italy. The Diretto 152 night train between Bari and Milan derailed at 1:56 a.m. shortly before entering the station, killing 13 and wounding 127. A special speed limitation of 30 km/h had been enforced by means of an M40 mandatory alert, but the train failed to slow down. While entering the switch between the first and the second track, the engine derailed at 102 km/h and fell to the right side. The train skidded for about 100 meters, coming to a stop against the station's water refill tower.
- The 1962 Voghera train crash occurred at track three of Voghera railway station, on the night of 31 May 1962. Sixty-four people died, and 40 were seriously injured. At 2:35 on 31 May 1962, a freight train from Milan, hauled by an E626 class electric locomotive, entered Voghera station at high speed, against protection signals set to 'danger'. It then collided with the rear of a passenger train, which was stationary on Track 3, and about to depart for Genoa.

=== 1970s ===
- The 1978 Murazze di Vado train disaster occurred on 15 April 1978, near Murazze di Vado, an area in the town of Vado, part of the Monzuno comune, Bologna. A passenger train derailed close to a ravine, and seconds later another train crashed into it. With 42 killed and 76 injured, it is the fourth highest death toll in the history of the Italian railways, after the Balvano, Fiumarella and Voghera disasters. While the official count of the injured is 76, the actual number of injured is often said to be from 117 to more than 120.

=== 1980s ===
- The 1980 Curinga train disaster occurred on 21 November 1980 between Curinga and Eccellente stations, in the Catanzaro province. The death toll was estimated at 10 dead and 80 injured, later updated to 20 and 122 respectively. The final count went up to 29 victims and 104 wounded. Ferrovie dello Stato train 587 was traveling southbound from Rome to Siracuse on the Salerno-Reggio Calabria railway. At 2:40 a.m., shortly after leaving Lamezia Terme station and heading to Paola, rammed into some loaded cars lost by a freight train leaving Lamezia Terme for Reggio Calabria.

== 21st century ==
=== 2000s ===
- The 2002 Rometta Marea derailment occurred on Saturday 20 July 2002 in Rometta Marea, part of the Rometta comune in Sicily, Italy. The Espresso (express train) 1932 Freccia della Laguna, a Ferrovie dello Stato train coming from Palermo to Messina, where it would join another convoy coming from Siracuse, derailed while entering the town of Rometta Marea and hit an abandoned building, 400 metres from a pass-through railway station. Of the 190 passengers on board, 8 were killed and 47 were injured.
- The 2005 Crevalcore train crash was a major railway accident which occurred on 7 January 2005 on the Verona–Bologna railway, Italy, killing 17. It was one of the worst accidents in the recent history of the state railway company Ferrovie dello Stato. In the accident, a cargo and a passenger train collided in dense fog after the passenger train's driver passed two red signals, possibly as a result of an unwarranted assumption by the driver that the line was clear, despite the warning signals.
- The 2005 Eurostar 9410 derailment was a minor accident which occurred in Bari, Apulia, Italy, on 24 October 2005. While causing no deaths, it left 30 wounded and five critically injured. It received considerable attention from mass media.
- The 2006 Rome Metro crash: on 17 October 2006 at 9:37 a.m. local time (07:37 UTC), one Rome Metro train ploughed into another train as it unloaded passengers at the Vittorio Emanuele underground station in the city centre, killing a 30-year-old Italian woman, Alessandra Lisi, and injuring about 145 others, of which a dozen were reported to be in life-threatening conditions.
- The 2009 Viareggio train derailment was the derailment of a freight train and subsequent fire which occurred on 29 June 2009 in a railway station in Viareggio, Lucca, a city in Central Italy's Tuscany region. Thirty-two people were killed and a further twenty-six were injured.

=== 2010s ===
- The 2010 Merano derailment occurred on 12 April 2010 when a train derailed between Latsch and Kastelbell, near Merano, Italy, after running into a landslide, causing nine deaths and injuring 28 people.
- The 2010 Circumvesuviana derailment occurred on Friday 6 August 2010 in Naples, Italy. A train of the Circumvesuviana line, a local railway providing transport in the area around the Mount Vesuvius, derailed between the San Giorgio a Cremano and Naples stations. The accident led to a single fatality, seventy-one-year-old Giuseppe Marotta, who lost his legs in the wreck and died shortly after arriving at Loreto Mare hospital. Among the fifty-eight injured, a twenty-five-year-old man entered a coma, and a woman had to be treated for severe wounds of the thorax and head. Eleven other people had severe wounds and had to be hospitalized.
- The 2016 Andria–Corato train collision happened late in the morning of 12 July 2016 when two regional passenger trains on a single-track section of the Bari–Barletta railway collided head-on between the towns of Andria and Corato in the Apulia region of southern Italy. Twenty-three people were killed and 54 injured. The stretch of track is operated by regional rail company Ferrotramviaria.
- The 2018 Pioltello train derailment: on 25 January 2018, a commuter train operated by Trenord derailed in Pioltello when two of its carriages came off the track en route to Milan. The incident killed three women and injured more than 100 people.

=== 2020s ===
- The 2020 Livraga derailment was the first crash on the Italian high speed rail network. It took place on 6 February 2020 when a high-speed train derailed at Livraga, Lombardy, Italy. Two people died and 31 were injured.
- On December 10, 2023, a Frecciarossa train collided with a passenger train in Faenza, 17 people were injured
