= Railway accidents in Australia =

Lists of railway accidents that have occurred in each state and territory of Australia are contained in the following articles:

- Railway accidents in New South Wales
- Railway accidents in the Northern Territory
- Railway accidents in Queensland
- Railway accidents in South Australia
- Railway accidents in Tasmania
- Railway accidents in Victoria
- Railway accidents in Western Australia
