= Lists of rail accidents =

A rail accident (or train wreck) is a type of disaster involving one or more trains. Train wrecks often occur as a result of miscommunication, as when a moving train meets another train on the same track, when the wheels of train come off the track or when a boiler explosion occurs. Train accidents have been widely covered in popular media and in folklore.

== By year ==
- Before 1880
- 1880–1889
- 1890–1899
- 1900–1909
- 1910–1919
- 1920–1929
- 1930–1939
- 1940–1949
- 1950–1959
- 1960–1969
- 1970–1979
- 1980–1989
- 1990–1999
- 2000–2009
- 2010–2019
- 2020–present

== By type ==
- By death toll
- List of train-surfing injuries and deaths
- Terrorist incidents

== By country ==
=== Africa ===
- Egypt – List of rail accidents in Egypt

=== Asia ===
- Bangladesh – List of rail accidents in Bangladesh
- China – List of rail accidents in China
- India – List of railway accidents and incidents in India
- Indonesia – List of rail accidents in Indonesia
- Iran – List of Iranian rail accidents
- Pakistan – List of railway accidents and incidents in Pakistan
- Philippines – List of rail accidents in the Philippines
- Sri Lanka – List of rail accidents in Sri Lanka
- Thailand – List of rail accidents in Thailand
- Turkey – List of rail accidents in Turkey
- South Korea - List of rail accidents in South Korea

=== Europe ===
- Czech Republic – List of Czech rail accidents
- Germany – List of German rail accidents
- Greece – List of rail accidents in Greece
- France – List of rail accidents in France
- Italy – List of rail accidents in Italy
- Ireland – List of Irish railway accidents
- Netherlands – List of rail accidents in the Netherlands
- Russia – List of Russian rail accidents
- Spain – List of rail accidents in Spain
- United Kingdom – List of rail accidents in the United Kingdom
- Yugoslavia – List of rail accidents in Yugoslavia

=== North America ===
- Canada – List of rail accidents in Canada
- United States – List of American railroad accidents

=== Oceania ===
- Australia
  - New South Wales – Railway accidents in New South Wales
  - Northern Territory – Railway accidents in the Northern Territory
  - Queensland – Railway accidents in Queensland
  - South Australia – Railway accidents in South Australia
  - Tasmania – Railway accidents in Tasmania
  - Victoria – Railway accidents in Victoria
  - Western Australia – Railway accidents in Western Australia
- New Zealand – List of rail accidents in New Zealand

== See also ==
- Derailment
- Rail transport
- Tram accident
- Train-pedestrian fatalities
- Train surfing
