= Crevalcore =

- Comune
- Comune di Crevalcore
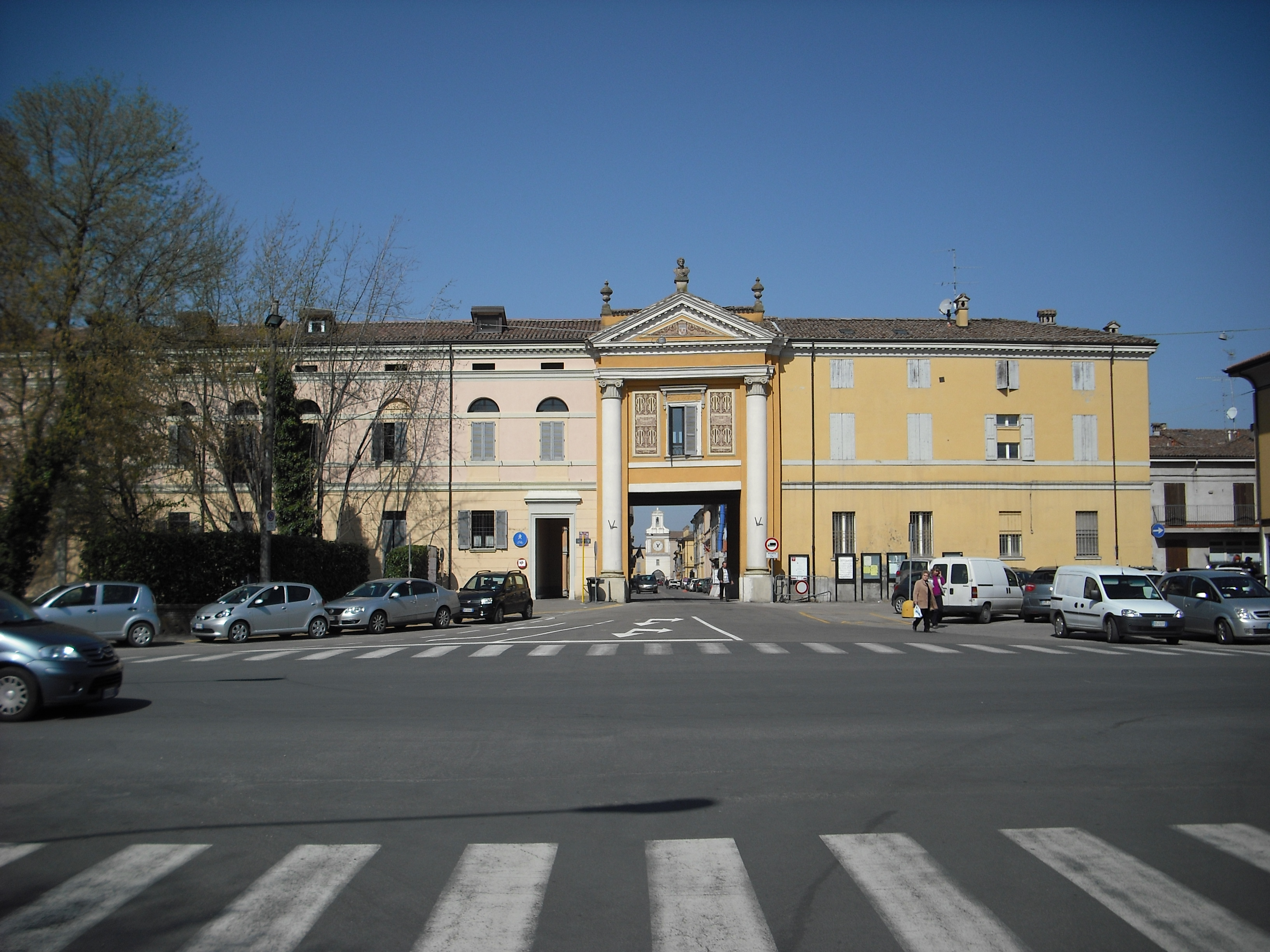

- Flag Coat of arms

- Location within Italy Location within Emilia-Romagna
- Coordinates: 44°43′N 11°09′E
- Country: Italy
- Region: Emilia-Romagna
- Metropolitan city: Bologna (BO)
- Frazioni: Bevilacqua, Bolognina, Caselle, Galeazza, località Guisa, Palata Pepoli, Sammartini

Government
  - Mayor: Marco Martelli

Area
  - Total: 102.75 km^{2} (39.67 sq mi)
- Elevation: 20 m (66 ft)

Population (30 June 2017)
  - Total: 13,544
  - Density: 131.82/km^{2} (341.40/sq mi)
- Demonym: Crevalcoresi
- Time zone: UTC+1 (CET)
  - Summer (DST): UTC+2 (CEST)
- Postal code: 40014
- Dialing code: 051
- Patron saint: St. Sylvester
- Saint day: December 31
- Website: Official website

Crevalcore (Western Bolognese: Crevalcôr) is a town and comune in the Metropolitan City of Bologna, Emilia-Romagna, northern Italy, near Bologna.

On January 7, 2005 a train crash in Crevalcore killed 17 people.

On May 20, 2012 an earthquake caused severe damage to several buildings in the city center.

== People ==
- Marcello Malpighi (1628 - 1694), doctor
- Antonio Leonelli (c. 1438–1441; after 1515 or 1525), painter
- Gaetano Lodi (1830 – 1886), a famous artist and ornamentation teacher
- Armando Bernabiti (1900 - 1970), architect

== See also ==
- Crevalcore train crash
