= Mario Musolesi =

Italian soldier (1914–1944)

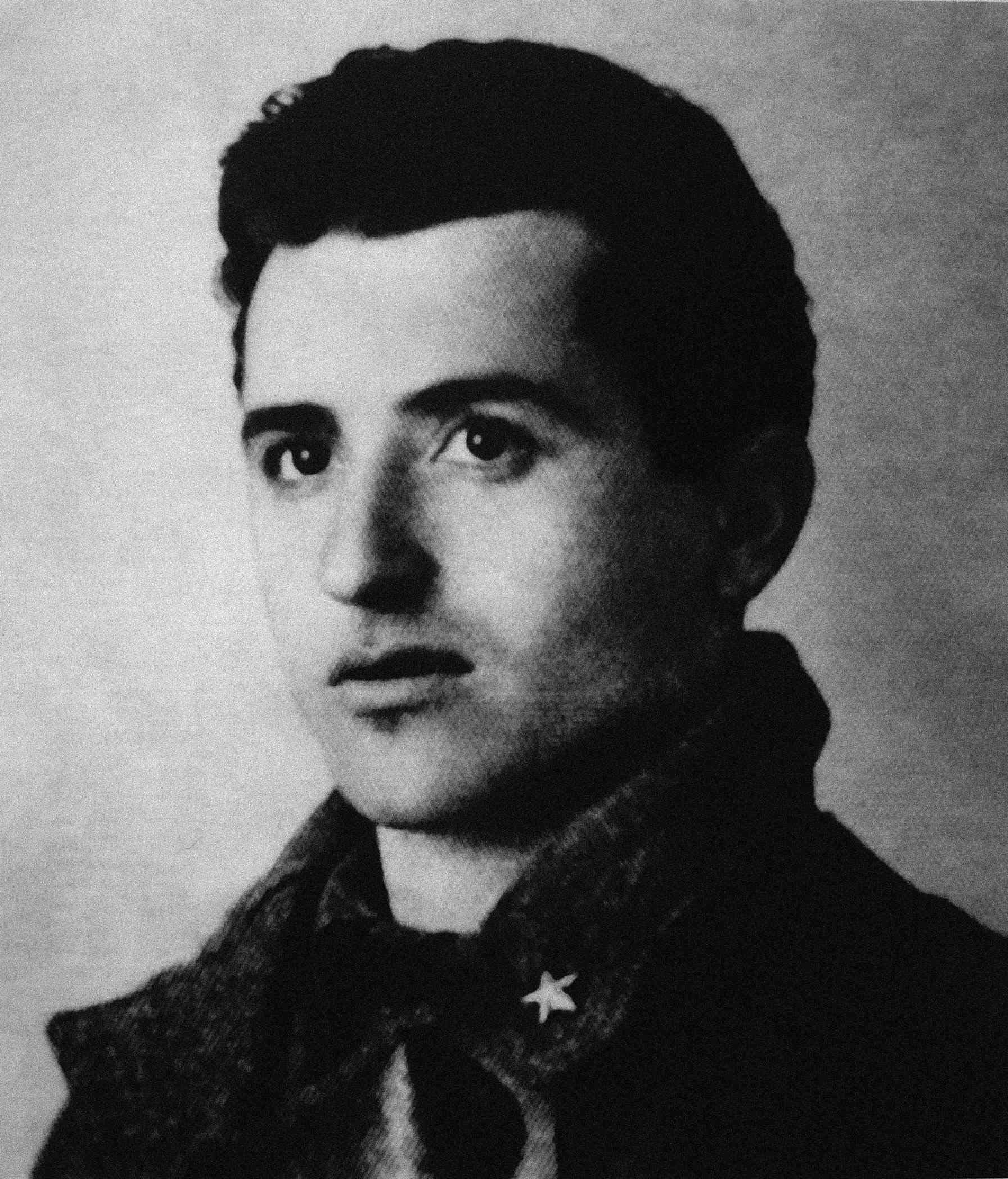
- Born: 1 August 1914; Monzuno, Kingdom of Italy
- Died: 29 September 1944 (aged 30); Marzabotto, Italian Social Republic
- Military career
- Allegiance: Kingdom of Italy
- Branch: Royal Italian Army
- Service years: 1940–1943
- Rank: Sergeant major
- Commands: "Red Star" Partisan Brigade
- Conflicts: Second Italo-Ethiopian War; World War II
- Awards: Gold Medal of Military Valour (posthumous)

Mario Musolesi (Vado di Monzuno, 1 August 1914 – Marzabotto, 29 September 1944) was an Italian soldier and Resistance leader during World War II.

== Early life ==
Musolesi was born into a large family (he had one brother, Guido, and six sisters) living in a village in the Bolognese Apennine. He initially worked as a mechanic.

=== Second Italo-Ethiopian War ===
During the Second Italo-Ethiopian War he was drafted into the Royal Italian Army and fought in Ethiopia, being awarded for courage shown in combat, but was later reported by the Carabinieri as an anti-fascist, for which he was repatriated and referred to a military court. He was released thanks to the intervention of his commander, who certified his value as a fighter, but was nevertheless demoted from the rank of sergeant major he had earned on the field.

== Second World War ==
=== North Africa, POW ===
He later fought as a tanker in North Africa, being captured by the British in 1942 but escaping and reaching the Italian lines after a three-day march in the desert; in the summer of 1943 he was wounded and repatriated, and at the time of the proclamation of the Armistice of Cassibile, on 8 September 1943, he was in service in an armoured unit stationed in Rome, with the rank of corporal first class.

=== Resistance activity ===
In the days that followed the Armistice, Musolesi participated in the unsuccessful defense of Rome against the Germans, fighting at Porta San Paolo; after the fall of Rome, he returned to his hometown in Emilia-Romagna, where, as a decorated veteran, he was offered by local Fascists the post of secretary of the Monzuno section of the Republican Fascist Party, which he refused. Instead, along with his brother Guido and a group of friends, he set out to establish a Resistance group, looking for weapons in Bologna. In October 1943 he publicly assaulted a Blackshirt who had accused him of spreading anti-fascist propaganda leaflets, for which he was arrested, but freed thanks to the armed intervention of his friends. He then took to the mountains, where he founded the "Stella Rossa" ("Red Star") Partisan Brigade on Monte Sole; in reprisal, the Fascists burned his house and arrested several of his relatives.

Musolesi, with the nom de guerre of "Lupo" ("Wolf"), became commander of the brigade, which quickly grew thanks to the influx of anti-fascists, youths evading the draft imposed by the Italian Social Republic, and escaped Allied prisoners. Most of its partisans came from the villages of Monte Sole; despite its name, it was a mostly apolitical brigade, as Musolesi did not have a specific party affiliation and only reluctantly accepted a Communist commissar sent by the National Liberation Committee. He stated that "Now it is the time to fight; time for politics will come later". The brigade's first action, on 23 November 1943, was to blow up the tracks of the Bologna-Florence railway near Grizzana, destroying a German supply train carrying petrol and vehicles; in the following months, partisan from the brigade carried out attacks on German and Fascist troops (especially on vehicles travelling the roads between Bologna, Florence and Pistoia) and sabotage actions, as well as targeting spies and collaborators. In February 1944 a Fascist infiltrator, Amedeo Arcioni, stabbed Musolesi, but was stopped and killed by Musolesi's comrades Giovanni Rossi and Alfonso Ventura. Musolesi later survived another assassination attempt while recovering from his wounds.

Musolesi then managed to get in touch with the British, which started sending weapons and supplies to his partisan brigade through airdrops. When his brother Guido and his parents were captured by the Fascists, who tortured them in the unsuccessful attempt of obtaining information about his whereabouts, he managed to obtain their release in exchange for five captured Fascists. By the summer of 1944 the "Red Star" Brigade had grown to seven to eight hundred partisans, although thanks to its heavy activity, with continuous and almost simultaneous attacks in different points of the territory, it was rumored to have 10,000 men. In one instance Musolesi and some of his men, disguised as Fascist militiamen, pretended to have captured three British runaway prisoners and thus managed to enter the Carabinieri barracks of Marzabotto, where they killed the petty officer in charge as well as two Fascist militiamen. The Italian Social Republic placed a bounty of a million lire on Musolesi's head, but the local population supported and helped the partisans.

=== Death ===
In the summer of 1944 German troops attacked the area of Sasso Marconi, Grizzana, Marzabotto, La Quercia and Vado, but were repelled by the "Red Star" Brigade with heavy losses. Not long after, a new offensive against the partisans was organized, carried out by troops from the 16th SS Panzergrenadier Division Reichsführer-SS and led by SS-Sturmbannführer Walter Reder; in the morning of 29 September 1944 the headquarters of the partisan brigade, whose location – near the hamlet of Cadotto – had been revealed by a traitor, were surrounded by the SS. In the ensuing firefight, Musolesi was killed by SS-Sturmmann Kurt Wölfle (who for this was awarded the Iron Cross) while trying to break out of the encirclement. The "Red Star" Brigade was destroyed in the operation, which lasted a week and also resulted in the systematic killing of the civilian population of Marzabotto, Monzuno and Grizzana Morandi, suspected of aiding the partisans, in the largest massacre carried out by the Nazis in Italy. Among the 775 massacred civilians was Musolesi's girlfriend, Livia Comellini, killed on 29 September along with her mother and younger brother. Musolesi's body was only found a year later; he was posthumously awarded the Gold Medal of Military Valor for his partisan activity.
