= List of Iranian rail accidents =

This is a list of Iranian rail accidents.

== Timeline ==
=== 20th century ===
- December 31, 1970 – Two trains collide at Ardakan, Yazd Province due to a signalman's error; a government source indicates 15 people killed, but journalists report at least 70 dead, with 130 injured.
- May 23, 1992 – A passenger train and freight train collide head-on along the Tehran-Ahvaz Line at the outskirts of Dorud, Lorestan, killing 26 people and injuring 28.

=== 21st century ===
- 18 February 2004 – Nearly 300 people were killed in the Nishapur train disaster and the entire village of Khayyam near Nishapur, Khorasan Province, was destroyed when runaway train wagons crashed into the community in the middle of the night and exploded, resulting in Iran's deadliest rail disaster.
- 5 June 2014 – A passenger train collided with a freight train in the north of the country. Ten people were killed.
- 22 July 2016 - At least 30 people were injured after a train collided with a truck at a railway crossing in Mazandaran.
- 25 November 2016 – Dagham train collision killed 49 persons, and injured 103 others in Semnan Province.
- 24 May 2020 – In Tehran, a passenger train travelling from Hamedan to Mashhad derailed in Parand. A total of 45 people were on the train. Five people were injured.
- 22 December 2021 - A Tehran Metro train crashed into another train after passing a red signal. 22 people were injured.
- 8 June 2022 – South Khorasan train derailment killed 22 persons and injured 86 persons in Tabas.
- 9 August 2025 – In Tabas, a passenger train derailed after hitting an excavator, injuring 30 people.

== See also ==
- List of rail accidents
- List of rail accidents by country
