= Rometta Marea derailment =

Train derailment (2002)

The Rometta Marea derailment occurred on Saturday 20 July 2002 in Rometta Marea, part of the Rometta comune in Sicily, Italy.

The Espresso (express train) 1932 Freccia della Laguna, a Ferrovie dello Stato train coming from Palermo to Messina, where it would join another convoy coming from Siracusa, derailed while entering the town of Rometta Marea and hit an abandoned building, 400 metres from a pass-through railway station. Of the 190 passengers on board, 8 were killed and 47 were injured.

== Train and rails conditions ==
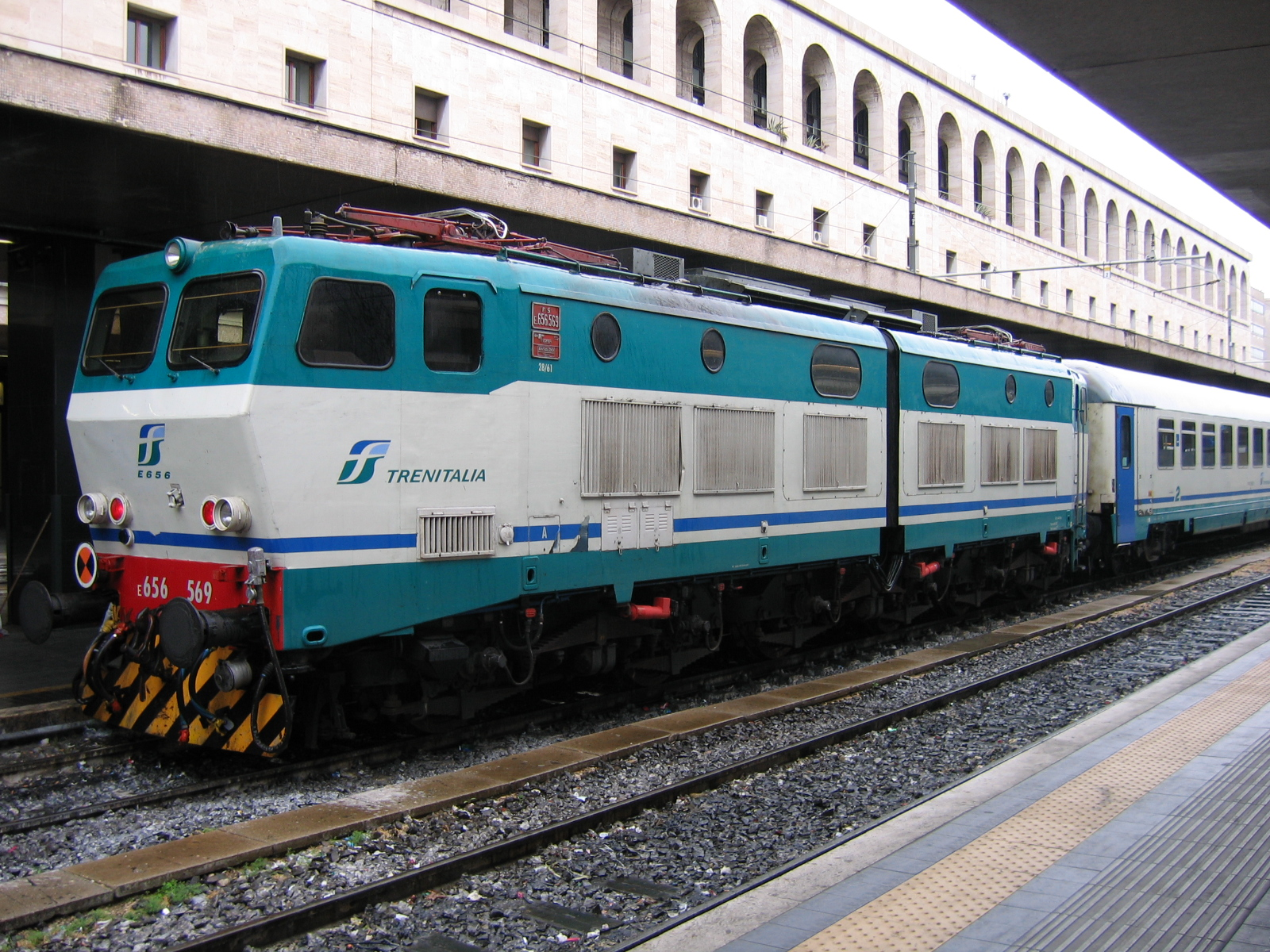
An FS Class E656 engine, similar to the one that derailed in Rometta Marea

E656.032 was a well-kept unit, and underwent major maintenance just a few weeks before. The speed limit on the line is 120 km/h, but the train was travelling at about 105 km/h. Maintenance was conducted on the line a few days before due to reports of abnormal banking by some train drivers; however, no major problems were found. After post-maintenance tests were completed, the usual speed limit on the line was restored.

== Accident ==
On 20 July 2002 the Freccia della Laguna left Palermo at 4 p.m., headed for Messina. There, the train would join another convoy, from Siracusa, and begin a long journey to northern Italy, ending in Venice's Santa Lucia station, where it was expected at 10:10 a.m. the next day. The derailment happened a few minutes before 7 p.m., after the train passed Venetico, while crossing a small bridge above the Saponara stream near the Rometta Marea station, 32 kilometers from Messina, in a place hardly reachable by rescue vehicles. The locomotive, FS Class E656 unit 032, abruptly left the rails. The next four carriages derailed and swerved across the rails, demolishing a nearby building (an old depot) owned by Ferrovie dello Stato and inhabited by three families of railwaymen, who were absent at the time. A fifth carriage derailed slightly, while two others stayed on the rails. The "whip effect" from the carriages turned the locomotive backwards, but carriages were only slightly hit by the out-of-control machine. The bridge was hit and partially collapsed. One of the two joined bodies of the locomotive hit the walls above the stream entrenchment, before dangling seven metres off the ground at the side of the bridge.

== Rescue operations ==
A few minutes after the crash, a hundred or so people from the nearby town rushed to the accident scene, including the city mayor, in order to help the passengers. They were quickly overwhelmed by the seriousness of the disaster, and little could be done without specialized equipment. Ten specialists from nearby Palermo Vigili del Fuoco's SAF forces (specialized in alpine, cave and river rescue), led by Commander Baldassare Battaglia, were dispatched to the disaster, along with four rescue vehicles, a truck with electric light projectors, two rescue helicopters and a heli-ambulance.

From Messina a hundred men from the Aosta Mechanized Infantry Brigade, with vehicles and first response equipment, were sent to the scene to help with the rescue. Helicopters from Messina navy base were placed on alert in case they were needed.

== Casualties ==
A carriage came to a rest just a couple of meters away from a local dweller, Antonio Carini, who was tending his vegetable garden. The carriage luckily remained upright, or the man would have been crushed. Carini was later instrumental in addressing the positions of the dead and injured engineers to the fire brigade led by Chief Giovanni Villari.

A train engineer, 36-year-old Marcello Raneri, was trapped in the crushed cabin. When the rescuers arrived at the scene, he shouted and called for help but could not be recovered. After an hour, medics and firemen were forced to amputate his legs in order to promptly remove him from the unstably balanced locomotive.

The second engineer, two Sri Lankan passengers, two Sicilian men and an unknown victim were initially recovered from the wreck. Two corpses were recovered later. Six of the seven casualties were in three compartments of the second carriage, the one that hit the building.

30 other passengers were injured, five of whom were in critical condition.

=== Casualty list ===
- Saverio Nania, 45-year-old train engineer from San Filippo del Mela, Messina
- Giuseppina Manmana, 22-year-old from Sicily living in Ludwigsburg, Germany
- Placido Caruso, 76-year-old from Messina
- Stefano La Malfa, 51-year-old from Milazzo
- Abdelhakim Miloudi, 75-year-old from Morocco living in Messina
- Fatima Fauhreddine, 59-year-old, Miloudi's wife
- Alì, 33-year-old, Miloudi's son
- Larbi, 35-year-old, Miloudi's son

== Inquiry ==
The derailment, according to the first Polizia Ferroviaria survey, was caused by a critical failure of a switch. Initial reports blaming the accident on bridge collapse were found erroneous. The hypothesis of a bogie failure was considered and rejected by railway technicians. Bogies underwent a periodic check just one month before, and achieved just 6 thousand kilometers after the routine checks. Two inquiries, a technical one and a judiciary one, were set up. Many engineers serving on the line were questioned by railway police; most of them reported (as some of them did before the accident to supervisors) anomalous shocks and quivering around the switches near the Semenzara bridge. These early reports alerted the local chief technician, who stressed the need for a line check with the national administration. This led to maintenance works on the line, which were completed just three days before the accident, bringing the speed limit back to 120 km/h from the temporary limit of 60 km/h.

Concetta Crescenti, wife of the deceased engineer Nania, told the inquirers that her husband frequently complained to her about the wobbling while crossing that area. Maintenance works found and fixed many problems in the old railway equipment, including some broken wooden sleepers and rail misalignment.

== Aftermath ==
Since the line was only equipped with a single track, daily traffic between Palermo and Messina was disrupted for several days. Skid signs were recorded on the rails meters before the derailment, pointing to a sub-optimal condition of the rails. Ferrovie dello Stato suspended its advertising campaign in the days following the tragedy. The train wreckage was left at the track side until 2004, when Police removed the seals protecting evidences and the engine, along with three coaches, was moved in a nearby location, (Note: 38°13′35.55″N 15°24′1.75″E Coaches and engine are still visible at this location.) and is still there.

== Previous accidents ==
In 1978 the same passenger train had been involved in another disaster, in Murazze di Vado. The Freccia della Laguna trampled another train and fell into a ravine, killing 42 and wounding 120.

On 15 June 1969 two trains collided head-on in the nearby rail tunnel of Galleria Sant'Antonio, in the nearby town of Barcellona, just 20 kilometers away, killing twenty.
