= Crevalcore train crash =

2005 railway incident in Italy

Coordinates: 44.768381°N 11.14369°E

The Crevalcore train crash was a major railway accident which occurred on 7 January 2005 on the Verona–Bologna railway, Italy, killing 17. It was one of the worst crashes in the recent history of the state railway company Ferrovie dello Stato. In the collision, a cargo and a passenger train collided in dense fog after the passenger train's driver passed two red signals, possibly as a result of an unwarranted assumption by the driver that the line was clear, despite the warning signals.

== Accident ==
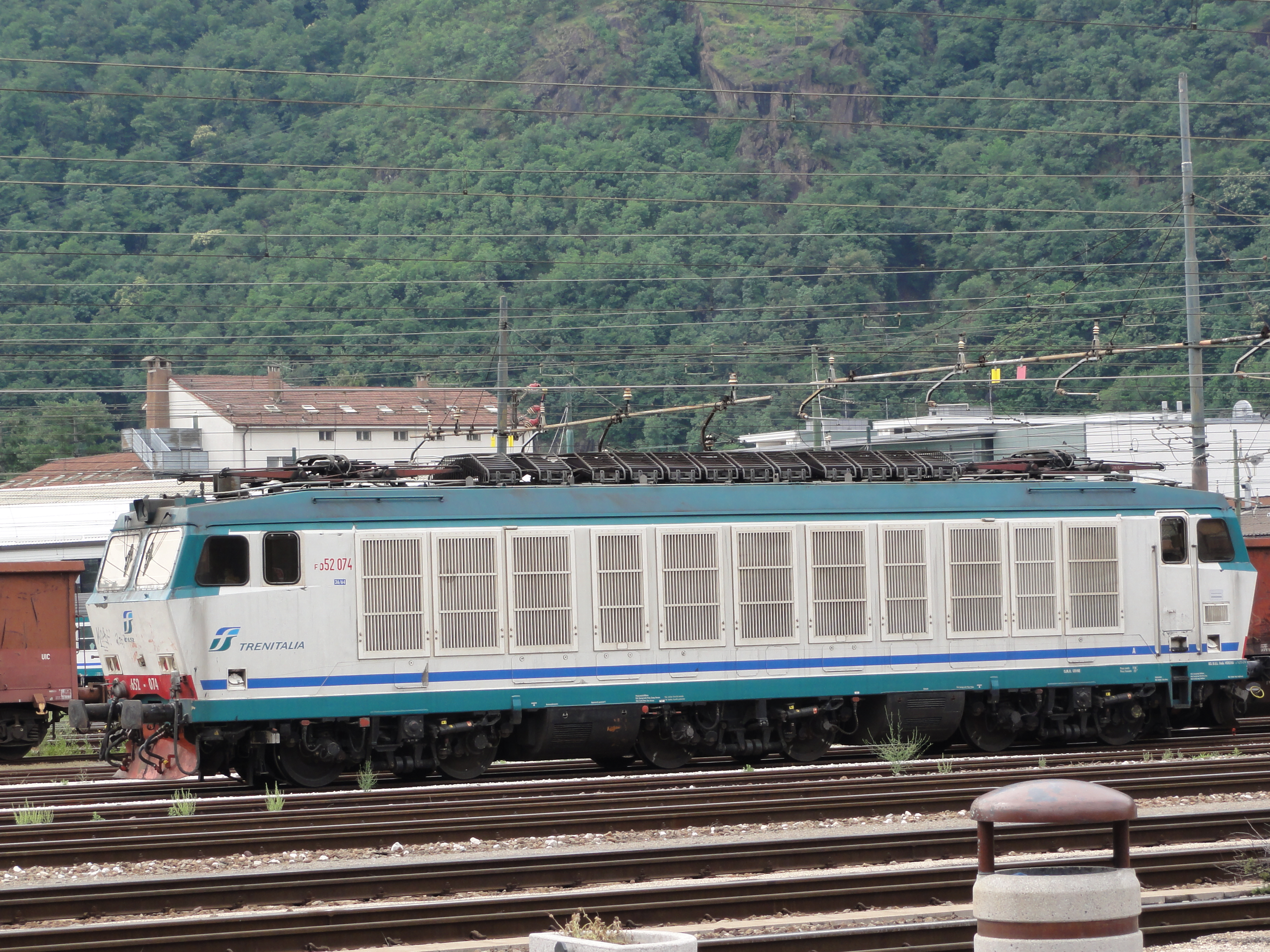
An FS E652 similar to the one pulling the cargo train involved in the crash

Cargo train n.59308, engine FS Class E652.100, left Rome in the morning of 7 January, headed to San Zeno-Folzano with a full load of girders. At the time of the crash, it was traveling at a speed estimated below 30 km/h on a single-rail stretch in the Verona-Bologna line near the abandoned station of Bolognina di Ronchi di Crevalcore.

The area was covered by a dense fog, a common condition especially in winter in the Po Valley. Visibility was estimated at 50 metres or less. At 12:53 Intercity 2225, a commuter passenger train, having left Verona at 11:39 and heading to Bologna, collided head-on at high speed with the slow-moving cargo train, breaking up on impact. The passenger cars were lifted by inertia and piled up on top of each other. Some of them suffered extensive damage even though they were all MDVE class, a very widespread Italian steel-framed design which has proven itself safe since the early 1980s.

The passenger train engine left the rails, leaving the first car fully exposed to the cargo train locomotive. The second car came to rest in an almost vertical condition.

== First rescue ==
Two hundred rescuers were dispatched to the disaster. The fog, low visibility, and muddy soil impaired rescue efforts. Throughout the rescue operation, ambulances had to be towed by tractors provided by local farmers.

Early assessments led to estimate 13 deaths – including the four drivers of the trains – and over 60 injured. Five passengers had to be hospitalized in critical conditions. A toll-free number for relatives to receive information on victims and wounded was established. Fifty people escaped the crash unscathed and were brought to Crevalcore by a bus provided by the comune. They later reached their destination by another train.

Local supermarkets set up a canteen service for the hundreds of rescuers and provided first necessities for survivors.

In the end, 17 were killed and more than 65 injured. Among the victims were all four train conductors (Vincenzo De Biase and Paolo Cinti from the Intercity, Equizio Abate and Ciro Cuccinello from the cargo).

The cargo engine had to be demolished in place, along with some of the cars.

=== Psychological issues ===
The eeriness of the disaster scene, along with the severity of the crash, led to psychological distress among both the survivors and the responders. Psychologists were sent to the crash site in order to cope with shocked passengers and firemen. The response to the Crevalcore crash was later used as a case study by Bologna University of Psychology.

Survivors' reactions were mixed: some of them displayed disbelief about the happening, while many were shocked into silence. Some exhibited irrational behaviors, such as crying for a miracle, or thanking the Virgin Mary while running in circles.

Feeling of powerlessness on the part of survivors who tried to help the injured was a major cause of post-traumatic disorders. Some survivors experienced "survivor's guilt", believing that they could have given more help.

Fog framed a horrific panorama for the firemen and medical personnel reaching the scene. The ghostly wreck – much bigger than expected – emerged from the fog "like a movie scene" (as stated by a rescuer questioned by University psychologists), just four to five meters away from the torn carriages.

Rescuers who concentrated intently on their tasks were found to have coped better with the psychological pressure. Some firemen kept working well beyond usual limits, trying to overcome their feelings with excessive work. Less experienced or less well trained rescuers experienced confusion and trauma when confronted with the unexpected enormity of the tragedy; this led to logistic problems, slowing the response.

Hallucinations were documented among some responders (for example, a severed human head was seen above the piled up coaches), inducing some cases of mass hysteria. Cries from the injured people were deemed a main cause of psychological breakdowns among the rescuers.

After the Crevalcore crash, new procedures of stress management and psychological counseling were developed to help responders better cope with the consequences arising from this sort of incident, moving from self-managed stress control (such as, for example, relying on the need to keep a "tough guy" stance in front of fellow responders) to a group-based approach (one such approach involves conducting "ceremonies" to help those involved rationalize the shocking experiences).

Almost all the responders, relatives and survivors who experienced mental problems ultimately managed to overcome them with help from counselors.

=== Related suicide ===
Train driver Alberto Guerro, a close friend of the cargo train's drivers, hanged himself five days after the disaster. He had already been suffering from post-traumatic depression after being involved in the Lavino di Mezzo (Bologna) derailment more than eight months before, and his friends' tragic endings are thought to have been a factor in his suicide. He is sometime dubbed Crevalcore's 18th victim.

== Inquiry ==
Five years after the disaster, the inquiry established that Vincenzo De Biase, engineer of the passenger train, missed two red signals entering a rail block occupied by the cargo train.

At the time of the crash, station controllers were not required to alert train drivers by phone in case of unusual crossings and charter trains, although it was a common practice anyway. The conditions for this crash unfortunately occurred soon after a shift change, so the customary phone call was forgotten.

De Biase was a very experienced train driver, who had been working for many years on the line. Most likely, according to the inquiry, he ignored the red signals since he had not received an advisory phone call. While fog may have been a factor, it was downplayed in the final inquiry response. Early hypotheses of his being under the influence of drugs or alcohol, or being talking on his cellphone, were dismissed after checks.

The official inquiry, led by Bologna's public prosecutor Andrea Scarpa, charged 10 people, including Trenitalia CEO Mauro Moretti and the Head of the infrastructure division of RFI Michele Mario Elia, of causing a rail disaster, involuntary homicide and involuntary wounding. They were all discharged on 11 May 2009.

Ultimately, the predominant blame was placed on De Biase, with minor remarks about the line's lack of extra safety measures. The inquiry result was disputed by train engineers associations and unions, who displayed 17 cardboard coffins in front of the courthouse.

== Aftermath ==
The crash location was one of many single-rail stretches of country's secondary railways. As many others, it was not equipped with automatic speed control and had only basic block control signaling. The nearest station, Bolognina di Crevalcore, was unmanned and the switch controls were remote controlled.

The Bologna-Verona railway, linking two major cities, is 114 kilometers long, but some two-thirds of it (72 kilometers) were single rail. An upgrade to a two-rail line has been completed in 2009, along with installation of SCMT (a device self-limiting train speed if needed) and SSC centralized control systems. Any of these upgrades could have avoided the disaster. Trenitalia blamed the lack of upgrade on unexpected funding cuts and missed payments by Silvio Berlusconi's government. A new special fund had been assigned on 20 December 2004, just 17 days before, to be paid off in the following years.

After the disaster, a security system installation was planned. Just 10 months later the new SCMT automatic control was installed, and cargo trains routes were changed in order to lighten the load on single rail stretches in favor of better equipped main lines. Line upgrade was deemed a priority and works were quickly initiated.

Railwaymen unions' requests for reduced speed limits in dense fog, new rules for train crossing and calls for a full scale deployment of automated traffic control systems on the whole Italian network went unheeded.

A 24-hour strike was held on 16–17 January 2005, in protest against the cuts to safety budget and the practice of blaming drivers and engineers in crashes where better equipment could have been a lifesaver. In the two years before the Crevalcore crash, five crashes including the Rometta Marea derailment caused injuries that could have been avoided by better funding of safety measures.

A city park located near the Bolognina station was dedicated to the victims, named Parco 7 gennaio 2005.
