= Antonio Leonelli =

Italian painter

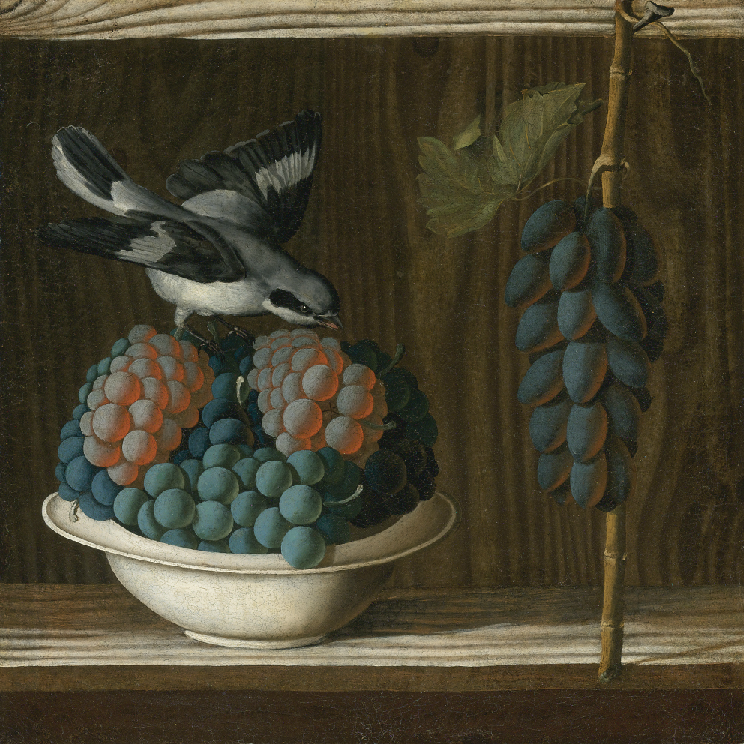
Still life of grapes with a bird

Antonio Leonelli or Antonio da Crevalcore (c. 1438–1441, in Crevalcore – after 1515 or 1525, in Bologna) was an Italian painter, mainly of still-life painting and some sacred subjects. Leonalli is considered by many to have trained in Ferrara, based on the similarities between his painting style, and works by other known Ferrarese painters working in Bologna at the time.

== Biography ==
He was registered as a painter in Bologna in 1461. A Holy Family (1493) by Leonelli was destroyed during the bombing of Berlin in 1945. he is known by documents to have painted for the church of San Petronio.

== Works ==
- Sacred Family, 1453 (Berlin, lost in 1945)
- Portrait of a young man, ca. 1475 (Museo Correr, Venice)
- Still Life with Grapes and a Bird, ca. 1500−1510 (Metropolitan Museum of Art New York City)
- Sacred Family, ca. 1510 (Staatsgalerie Stuttgart)

== Possible Works ==
- Family portrait, ca. 1480 (Alte Pinakothek Munich)
