= Murazze di Vado train disaster =

1978 railway incident in Italy

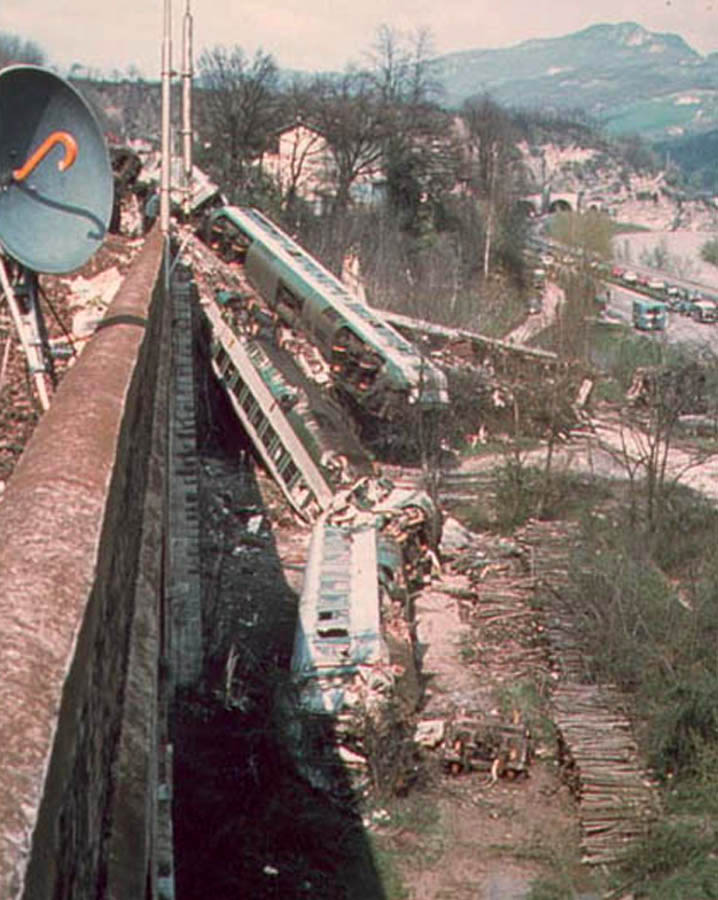
View of the derailed Freccia della Laguna

The Murazze di Vado train disaster was a railway accident which occurred on 15 April 1978, near Murazze di Vado, an area in the town of Vado, part of the Monzuno comune, Bologna. A passenger train was derailed close to a ravine, and seconds later a second train crashed into it.

With 42 killed and 76 injured, it is the fourth highest death toll in the history of the Italian railways, after the Balvano, Fiumarella and Voghera disasters. While the official count of the injured is 76, the actual number of injured is often said to be from 117 to more than 120.

== Derailment and crash ==
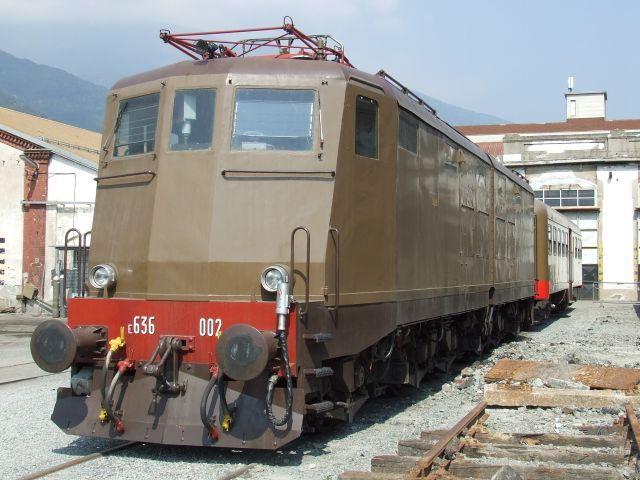
FS Class E.636.002, the same class as engine n.282, damaged in the accident

The accident, also known as 'Freccia della Laguna train disaster', occurred between Express passenger train '572 bis', travelling northbound to Bologna, and Rapido (equivalent to an actual Intercity) train 813 'Freccia della Laguna', travelling southbound to Florence.

Passenger train "572 bis" was not a train normally travelling on the Firenze-Bologna route. Coming from Bari, Apulia Region, and being headed towards Trieste, Friuli-Venezia Giulia Region, its normal route was the Adriatic one (Bari-Foggia-Pescara-Ancona-Bologna), thus normally not travelling between Florence and Bologna. At that time, nonetheless, an intense bad weather was hitting almost the whole Italian peninsula, and this caused a bridge along the Adriatic route to be heavily damaged by a seastrike. Therefore, all traffic normally running along that route (obviously including the '572 bis' express train) was diverted via Caserta, Rome and Florence.

Express train '572 bis', pulled by two engines (FS Class E.645.016 and FS Class E.636.282), was traveling along the Direttissima (Florence–Rome high-speed railway) line between Florence and Bologna when, shortly after noon, it was derailed to the right by a small landslide that fell onto the rails, due to the heavy rain underway. In that section, the railway track was laid metres from a ravine along the A1 motorway but the first engine (E.645.016) fortunately stopped shortly before falling: up to that point, no major injuries had been caused by the accident, but the derailed E.645.016 was now askew, occupying both tracks of the railway line.

The "Rapido 813", nicknamed "Freccia della Laguna", coming from Bolzano and heading to Rome was running on the opposite track: the train was made up of two FS Class ALe 601 units, 051 and 067, along with FS Class Le 480.010 and FS Class Le 601.024 coaches. The Freccia della Laguna was on a rapid service, thus traveling at medium-high speed (about 110 km/h), when it hit the derailed engine, still askew on both tracks and balanced on the border of the ravine. There was no chance for the driver of the incoming train to see the derailed engine because this one stopped shortly before the entrance of a tunnel.

The crash forced the first four cars of Rapido 813 into the gorge: the two engines from 572 bis were lifted from their bogies, the bodies being crushed, falling to one side and coming to rest one above the other, with E.645 on top. Nobody on board the 572 bis express train was injured in the accident, except for the two drivers, who were both killed because they no time to escape the driving cabin.

Among the passengers of the Rapido 813 were the Verona soccer team, who was travelling to Rome for a scheduled soccer match. At the time of the accident, they were in the restaurant car, one of the less damaged cars, and so escaped the disaster almost unscathed. They took the train because the flight they booked had been canceled for bad weather conditions. Their assigned seats were in the first car of the Rapido 813, but they had the luck to be called to the restaurant car for the first lunch shift; other passengers sitting in the fore carriages, scheduled to be called for the second shift, were mostly killed or heavily injured.

== First response coordination ==
The Murazze di Vado disaster was the first large scale rescue operation managed by CePIS (Centrale per il coordinamento Per Il Soccorso, Central for coordination of Rescue Operations), a public organization founded after the 1974 Italicus Express bombing to provide better first aid in emergencies and improve coordination of local response services on a regional scale.

CePIS was instrumental in creating the first unified emergency number in Italy, setting up the first centralized regional emergency management center, and joining the many hospitals and private ambulance crews under a single directorate.

The coordination of the rescue services was widely praised for their efficiency in the Murazze di Vado disaster. Coordination between police forces, crews and rescue vehicles allowed for speedy evacuation of the injured to Bologna's Ospedale Maggiore, unprecedented in the country and replicated a few years later in the Bologna Massacre of 1980.

CePIS later became the instigator of Italy's 118 unified emergency number created in the wake of 1990 FIFA World Cup, phased out in 2011 in favor of the 112 European unified number.

The initial rescues were brought on the disaster scene by car and truck drivers who were travelling along the A1 Motorway, which in that section is running meters aside the railway line.

== Aftermath ==
E.645.016 was demolished after the disaster, along with the full ALe 601-Le 480 trainset. E.636.282 was rebuilt and put back into service. After the disaster the Rapido 813 was renamed as Marco Polo.
