= Railway accidents in Victoria =

Events in the Australian state

There have been a number of train accidents on the railway network of Victoria, Australia. Some of these are listed below.

== Fatal accidents ==
=== North Geelong, 1857 ===
On 25 June 1857, the inaugural train of the Geelong and Melbourne Railway Company left Geelong at 10 a.m., bound for the company's temporary Melbourne terminus at Greenwich (now Newport). When the train passed under the road overpass adjacent to the Ocean Child Hotel in North Geelong, Henry Walter, the locomotive superintendent of the company, was knocked off the locomotive and fatally injured.

=== Jolimont, 1881 ===
On 30 August 1881, the first accident in Victoria involving passenger deaths and multiple injuries occurred. Four passengers were killed, and 39 were injured, when a tyre broke on one of the wheels of the 8:54am express from Brighton to Flinders Street Station, causing the derailment of five carriages near Jolimont. The first car to leave the rails, the fourth in a train of nine, was dragged along the metals for some distance. When the forward coupling eventually broke, the carriage fell over an embankment about three feet high, into swampy ground. With the rear coupling of the toppled carriage still attached to those behind, the remainder of the train was suddenly checked, and the momentum of the fifth and sixth carriages caused them to shoot upwards, and then fall in the same direction. The carriage that had fallen was completely crushed beneath the one to which it had been coupled. The remainder of the carriages were brought to a standstill, and although the seventh and eighth had left the rails, they did not fall. There were about 120 passengers in the three carriages that toppled over the embankment.

=== Picnic, 1882 ===
On the evening of 2 December 1882, one passenger was killed and 178 were injured when a head-on collision occurred between a special train, which had been engaged to convey intending purchasers of land from the sale of the Box Hill estate, and the ordinary train from Melbourne to Camberwell. The disaster happened about 100 yards (90 m) from a small wayside station called Picnic, between East Richmond and Hawthorn. The drivers knew nothing of the impending catastrophe until they got within 200 or 300 yards (185 or 275 m) of each other, and, because both trains were travelling at a fair speed, the distance was too short to enable them to avoid a collision. The drivers stuck to their locomotives until they were within just a few feet of each other, when they jumped off. The buffers of the engines snapped, and the front of the engine attached to the train from Melbourne was smashed in right up to the funnel. Two carriages in each train were telescoped.

=== Little River, 1884 ===
On Wednesday, 2 April 1884, the 8.20 p.m. goods train from Melbourne to Geelong received the staff from the porter at Werribee station and proceeded to Little River, where the train was to cross with the 7.10 p.m. passenger train from Geelong to Melbourne. In the unauthorised absence of the Werribee stationmaster at choir practice, his 17-year-old daughter inexplicably telegraphed to Little River that the line was clear. Consequently, Little River station released the passenger train to travel to Werribee. In darkness and heavy rain, the two trains collided head on near Little River. The two drivers and one passenger were killed. One of the drivers killed was Thomas Kitchen, who had been driving one of the trains involved in the accident at Picnic 18 months before.

=== Sunbury, 1884 ===
Also on 2 April 1884, the boiler of a locomotive hauling a goods train on the Bendigo line exploded near the Jacksons Creek viaduct, just north of Sunbury station. The fireman was killed and the driver died a few days later.

=== Windsor, 1887 ===
On 11 May 1887 the 5.30 p.m. train from Flinders Street station to Balaclava came to a standstill just before Windsor station because the outer home signal was at danger. When the signal changed to proceed, the train would not move because the air brake hose pipe between the locomotive and the first carriage had broken, meaning that the brakes could not be released.

The guard of the train did not go back to warn approaching trains, as required by the rules. Instead he walked forward to examine the brake problem. An express train to Brighton, which had left Flinders Street ten minutes after the disabled train, crashed into it from the rear. The driver of the express could not see the stationary train until far too late, owing to the curve in the track just beyond the High Street bridge over the line.

The locomotive of the express demolished the guard's van of the Balaclava train, as well as three of its carriages. Six people were killed, including the driver and fireman of the express. Ironically, the Chairman of the Victorian Railways Commissioners, Richard Speight, and his fellow commissioner William Green, were travelling in the express. They were uninjured.

=== Hawksburn, 1896 ===
On Friday 30 May 1896, Charles Heatley, the stationmaster of Hawksburn station, was struck and killed by a goods train while he was crossing the tracks at the station. As a passenger train was pulling up there, Heatley jumped down from the opposite platform and stood between the tracks, waiting for an opportunity to cross to the platform at which the train has arrived. He was not aware of a goods train approaching from the other direction and was hit by the locomotive, throwing him against the passenger train. Heatly died of his injuries in hospital without regaining consciousness.

=== Moranding (Kurkuruc Creek), 1907 ===
On 4 October 1907, the driver and fireman of a goods train, running from Kilmore to Tooborac, died from shocking injuries sustained after their locomotive, and most of the train, derailed and toppled off the bridge over Kurkuruc Creek, near Moranding, on the Heathcote Junction to Bendigo line. The verdict of the coroner was that the accident had been caused by a broken fishplate on rails on the bridge. However, evidence presented at a subsequent government inquiry indicated that the train had derailed before it reached the bridge, and the broken fishplate was one of the effects of the accident, not its cause. The inquiry decided that the derailment must have been the result of some obstruction on one of the rails, which was not able to be found, due to the accident and the work done in clearing up the wreckage.

=== Ravenswood, 1907 ===
On the night of 21 October 1907, three loaded sheep trucks and a guard's van, which had broken away from a goods train to Melbourne while ascending Porcupine Hill, careered back down the line and smashed into a following train waiting at Ravenswood station. A drover accompanying the livestock, who was apparently asleep in the runaway guard's van, was fatally injured.

=== Sunshine, 1908 ===
On 20 April 1908, a train packed with holidaymakers returning to Melbourne from Ballarat was struck by another train coming from Bendigo. Forty-four people were killed and 413 injured.

=== Beaufort, 1910 ===
On 5 February 1910, a double headed goods train from Stawell, composed of 35 trucks carrying wheat, got out of control as it descended a relatively gentle 3-mile (4.8 km) grade into Beaufort station. A light engine (i.e. one without a train) was standing in Beaufort station as the runaway train approached, and the signalman turned the oncoming train into a dead-end siding.

When the train struck the buffers at the end of the siding, the leading locomotive derailed, with its tender in an almost perpendicular position. The second locomotive and its tender were jammed together in the form of a "V". The driver of the leading locomotive and the fireman of the second one were killed outright, and the fireman of the first engine was trapped in the wreckage and could not be extricated before he died. The driver of the second engine was able to jump clear, but suffered scalding to the face and internal injuries. The accident was caused by brake failure.

=== Richmond, 1910 ===
On 18 July 1910, nine people were killed and over 400 were injured when, in heavy fog, a train from Elsternwick crashed into the rear of a train from Brighton at Richmond station. It is believed to be the first Australian rail accident recorded on film.

=== Kilmore Junction, 1910 ===
On 19 November 1910, the driver of a goods train was killed after his train got out of control on the Heathcote branch line, as it descended the steep grade leading to the junction of the branch with the main North East railway line at Kilmore Junction (later known as Heathcote Junction). The air brakes on the train had become defective, so the driver and guard decided to use the hand brakes on the goods wagons to control the train on its descent. These proved ineffective and the train ran away down the grade. It was diverted on to a 66-yard (60 m) runaway siding which had recently been provided at the junction to prevent out-of-control trains from running on to the main line. When the locomotive hit the clay bank at the end of the runaway track it overturned, and the driver was fatally injured.

=== West Melbourne, 1912 ===
On the afternoon of 4 September 1912, two people were killed and over 60 people injured when a special train, bringing passengers back to Melbourne from the Royal Melbourne Show, collided with a suburban train travelling to Coburg. The accident occurred on the Dudley Street bridge, between Spencer Street and North Melbourne stations. The Show special was supposed to be held at a signal so that the Coburg train could cross in front of it while switching tracks. However, the special ran through the signal and the locomotives of the two trains collided. Three carriages of the Coburg train were telescoped and two compartments of the first carriage of the show train were badly damaged.

=== Highett, 1925 ===
On 23 March 1925, eight people in an automobile were killed at the Wickham Road crossing at Highett, when the driver passed through an open gate and into the path of a parcel goods train.

=== Caulfield, 1926 ===
On 26 May 1926, three people were killed and 30 injured when an Oakleigh-bound train ran into the rear of a Carrum-bound train standing at platform 4. It was alleged that the driver of the Oakleigh train had run through a stop signal, but he was acquitted of manslaughter at a subsequent trial.

=== Newport, 1929 ===
A Leyland railmotor, running from Geelong to Melbourne, with 17 passengers aboard, derailed at the Wheate's Lead (now Kororoit Creek Road) level crossing, colliding with a lineside telegraph pole. One passenger later died in hospital, and three were injured. The cause of the accident was the failure of a roller bearing on one of the non-driving axles.

=== Keon Park, 1932 ===
On 14 October 1932, a railway ganger travelling on a railway tricycle from Keon Park to Reservoir was run down by an electric train, and received fatal injuries.

=== Seymour, 1935 ===
In the early hours of 1 September 1935, an empty passenger train, returning from Albury to Melbourne, ran into the rear of another empty passenger train, which had been halted at a signal just north of Seymour station. The guard of the stationary train, Thomas Middlin, jumped clear just before the crash, but died later that day from injuries he received. The signalman at the previous station, Mangalore, had fallen asleep after the passage of the first train, and awoke as the second train approached, allowing it to proceed despite not having received a "line clear" signal from Seymour. The driver of the second train had also been travelling too fast to stop in time after passing the distant signal at Seymour which was at danger. The signalman at Mangalore was later acquitted of a charge of manslaughter.

=== St. Albans, 1940 ===
On 27 September 1940, farmer John Ferris was driving across the Kororoit Road level crossing at St. Albans when he was struck by the 3.25pm train from Bendigo to Melbourne. He was killed in the collision.

=== Wodonga, 1943 ===
On 8 May 1943, a bus carrying Australian Army personnel from Bonegilla to Albury for a Saturday night recreation leave was hit by Steam locomotive A2 863 at the level crossing on the Tallangatta Road to Wodonga. The driver, twenty-three servicemen and a member of the Australian Army Medical Women's Service (AAMWS) were killed. Nine other service people were injured.

=== Boronia, 1944 ===
On 30 October, five people were killed when the car in which they were travelling was hit by a Melbourne-bound electric train at a level crossing near Boronia railway station at about 4:30pm. The dead were members of two families, who were returning home after picking up the mother of the car driver, who had been on holiday at Ferntree Gully. It was felt that, as the car approached the level crossing from the east, the glare of the sun prevented the driver from seeing the approaching train.

=== Seaford, 1946 ===
One passenger was killed when an electric train derailed on the Frankston side of the Wells Road level crossing on the afternoon of 13 February. The victim was the only passenger in the rear carriage of the train which derailed and struck the stanchions supporting the overhead wiring. Apparently the track had buckled due to hot weather.

=== Serviceton, 1951 ===
On 7 September 1951, a westbound Overland interstate express train was involved in a head-on collision with an eastbound Overland at Serviceton. The fireman on the westbound express was killed. Three of the four A2 class locomotives involved were cut up on the spot; the fourth one (A2 946) was repaired.

=== Horsham, 1951 ===
On 24 February 1951 11 people were killed when a tourist bus and a train collided.

=== Sunbury, 1952 ===
On the evening of 6 February 1952, a goods train collided with the rear of a stationary goods train at Sunbury. The stationary train was stopped for engine requirements, taking water, before continuing towards Bendigo. The guard of the stationary train was killed and another guard was injured.

=== Boronia, 1952 ===
On 1 June 1952 nine people were killed and seventeen injured when a bus carrying more than 30 members of a Church of Christ social group was run into by an electric train at the Boronia Road level crossing in Boronia.

=== Moriac, 1952 ===
On 13 April 1952, a woman was killed and seven people were seriously injured when two passenger trains collided. A Melbourne-bound train collided with a Warrnambool-bound train, which was still shunting into siding at the station to allow the Melbourne-bound train to pass it on the single track. Both engines were derailed. The victim was in the first carriage of the Melbourne-bound train, which was telescoped after being forced into the tender of the locomotive.

=== Deer Park, 1956 ===
On 1 May 1956 a level crossing collision with a train caused 2 deaths and wrecked a utility.

=== Traralgon, 1960 ===
On 20 March 1960, a railmotor from Maffra, heading to Traralgon station to connect with The Gippslander train to Melbourne, collided with a school bus at the Liddiard Road level crossing. The bus driver and five children died, and twenty-three were injured.

=== Dandenong, 1964 ===
A man died when a panel van he was driving was hit by the 3:58pm Melbourne to Leongatha train at Green's Road, Dandenong level crossing. The crossing was not equipped with warning devices.

=== Violet Town, 1969 ===
On 7 February 1969, a Southbound Southern Aurora passenger train was involved in head-on collision with a northbound Goods train near Violet Town. Nine people were killed.

=== Irymple, 1969 ===
At 8.40am on 22 April 1969, a fully loaded petrol tanker drove into the path of the Mildura Express, on the Irymple Avenue level crossing in Irymple. The driver of the train was killed, while the fireman and truck driver received severe burns in the resulting fireball.

=== Zimmler's Crossing (Glenorchy), 1971 ===
On 8 February 1971 one man was killed and 15 injured in a collision between a gravel truck and a two-carriage passenger train.

=== Laverton, 1976 ===
On 10 July 1976 the up Port Fairy to Melbourne passenger train, hauled by locomotive B61, derailed at Laverton. The derailment was caused by the train diverging through a 25 mph (40 km/h) crossover at high speed. The driver did not realise that the train was being diverted from the west line (which was the normal up line) to the east line. The crossover was very close to the Princes Highway rail overpass, the supports of which were hit by the train after it derailed. As a result, the first carriage, which was wooden bodied, was demolished to floor level. One passenger in that carriage was killed and there were a number of injuries.

=== Barnawartha, 1982 ===
On 17 June 1982, the driver and co-driver of a Melbourne-bound goods train were killed, and a number of other people injured, when the train ran into the rear of the Spirit of Progress, which had broken down in heavy fog just north of Barnawartha station. The goods train crew ran through a red signal protecting the broken-down train ahead, but the train controllers in Melbourne could not warn the crew of the impending collision, because radio systems had not then been installed in locomotives.

=== Swan Hill, 1991 ===
Five people were killed when their car was struck at the Pental Island railway crossing by a train that had just departed for Melbourne two kilometres from Swan Hill station at 5.10pm on Sunday 8 September 1991.

=== Diamond Creek, 1991 ===
A nine-year-old boy died after being struck by a train near Diamond Creek Station on Sunday 22 December. His bicycle had become stuck on tracks as the train approached.

=== North Williamstown, 1993 ===
A 12-year-old girl and her 10-year-old brother were struck and killed by a train at the North Williamstown level crossing.

=== Rosanna, 1995 ===
Two boys, aged eight and nine, were struck and killed by a train as they attempted to cross railway tracks near Rosanna on 31 March 1995.

=== Werribee, 1995 ===
On 2 September 1995, a Melbourne to Warrnambool train derailed at Werribee. A motorist driving next to the track was killed when a stanchion crushed her car. The derailed train had carried the stanchion 30 metres to the railway crossing where it fell on the car as it waited behind a boom gate. Six passengers on the train were taken to hospital where they were treated for shock and minor injuries.

=== Diamond Creek, 1996 ===
On 27 October 1996, a teenager who was throwing rocks at passing trains was struck by a train and killed near Diamond Creek station.

=== Northcote, 1996 ===
On 10 December 1996, a man was killed when his car was sandwiched between two suburban trains at the Clarke Street, Northcote level crossing, near Merri Station. It was understood that the man drove onto the level crossing before his car was struck.

=== Woodend, 1997 ===
On 2 January an elderly couple was killed when their car was struck by a train at the Woodend-Trentham Road level crossing in Woodend. Police believed the driver did not see the train when they stopped on the tracks.

=== Benalla, 2002 ===
In October 2002 a B-Double semi trailer collided with a heritage steam train at Benalla. Three people were killed and a fourth received severe steam burns when the locomotive rolled onto its side. The driver of the truck was charged but later acquitted of culpable driving.

=== St Albans, 2004 ===
On 5 August 2004 three people were killed in a level crossing accident at approximately 6:15 a.m. A car had stopped on the tracks because an earlier road collision had caused a traffic bank-up which prevented it from clearing the crossing. The car was struck by train 8002, the 5:20 a.m. from Kyneton, and all three people inside the vehicle died as a result.

=== Horsham, 2005 ===
At approximately 12:13 Eastern Standard Time on 11 August 2005, a small motor vehicle drove into the path of a Pacific National locomotive, G535, on the Edith Street level crossing at Horsham in Victoria. The crossing is protected by flashing lights a bell, approach warning signs and road markings. The driver of the motor vehicle was fatally injured as a result of the collision.

=== Wingeel, 2006 ===
At 16:53 on Wednesday 15 November 2006, a north-east bound tip truck towing a tri-axle trailer drove into the path of south-east bound passenger train 4AM8, The Overland, at the BarpinbaPoorneet Road level crossing, near Wingeel in southern Victoria. As a consequence of the collision the driver of the truck was fatally injured.

=== Trawalla, 2006 ===
On 28 April 2006 a V/Line VLocity train running an Ararat to Ballarat service, struck the trailer of a truck transporting a 14-tonne block of granite, at a passively-protected level crossing. The accident killed two people (train driver and one passenger) and injured twenty-eight passengers.

=== Lismore, 2006 ===
The Australian Transport Safety Bureau found that heavy fog and the inappropriate speed of a truck in the conditions were the main contributors to a collision with a freight train at the Lismore Skipton Road level crossing at Lismore on 25 May 2006. The 34-year-old driver of the truck was fatally injured in the accident, which closed the main Adelaide to Melbourne rail line for six days.

=== Kerang, 2007 ===
On 5 June 2007 a semi-trailer truck ran into the side of a southbound three-carriage V/Line passenger train at a level crossing north of Kerang, where the Yungera railway line crosses the Murray Valley Highway. 11 passengers on the train were killed.

=== Cheltenham, 2008 ===
On 10 May 2008 former Saddle Club star Jessica Jacobs stumbled off a platform at Cheltenham railway station and was hit by a train.

=== Dandenong, 2008 ===
On 18 November 2008 one person was killed in level crossing accident.

=== Clayton, 2011 ===
On 8 April 2011 a woman was struck and killed by a train just after midday at Clayton station.

=== Cheltenham, 2012 ===
On 16 March 2012 a man was killed when a train crashed into his car at the Cheltenham Railway Station in peak hour.

=== Werribee, 2012 ===
On 25 May 2012, a woman was killed after a train smashed into a car on a level crossing in Werribee in Melbourne's west. Police said the 65-year-old woman was a passenger in a Toyota Corolla which stopped on the tracks of the Cherry St level crossing before it was hit by a city-bound goods train at 5:45 pm. Police believe the vehicle in front had broken down causing the Toyota to stop on the tracks. The woman died at the scene while the driver, a woman in her 30s, was freed from the car and taken to The Alfred hospital in a stable condition.

=== Clayton, 2012 ===
On 8 October 2012 a 28-year-old man was killed after being hit by a train at Clayton railway station. Police have been told he was crossing the tracks near the railway station when the crash happened just after 12:30pm.

=== Dandenong South, 2012 ===
On 3 November 2012, a truck travelling west on Abbotts Road, Dandenong South, struck a Cranbourne-bound Metro train at about 11:40am, causing extensive damage to the train and infrastructure. One passenger died while being treated by paramedics and at least six others were injured. The train driver was taken to hospital with life-threatening injuries, but later made a full recovery. Police alleged that the truck driver was asleep at the wheel when he drove through the lowered boom gates at the crossing.

=== Surrey Hills, 2016 ===
On 14 September 2016, two women were killed at the Union Road level crossing after their car was stuck on the track in heavy traffic. The victims' car was crushed against the Surrey Hills station platform by a Box Hill-bound express train at approximately 4:00 pm. Following this incident, the level crossing has since been removed in 2023 by the Level Crossing Removal Project.

=== Wallan, 2020 ===
On 20 February 2020, two people, confirmed to be the train driver and a safe working person were killed near Wallan after a Melbourne-bound XPT derailed at approximately 7:45pm. Numerous other injuries occurred and one person was airlifted to Melbourne.

=== Altona, 2025 ===
On 30 November 2025, a man on a bicycle was struck by Comeng set 471M at approximately 11:17 am. Emergency services soon arrived and later pronounced the man dead at the scene.

=== Cressy, 2026 ===
On 20 January 2026, an SCT Logistics freight train traveling to Melbourne from Perth collided with a car on the tracks at the Reddies Road level crossing in Cressy at approximately 10:15am, killing two occupants inside of the vehicle.

== Accidents with injuries only ==
=== Geelong West, 1873 ===
Just after a goods train travelling from Geelong to Ballarat had passed under the Telegraph Bridge on 20 August 1873, the boiler of the locomotive burst. The locomotive and tender were overturned, and the first half-dozen goods wagons were more or less destroyed. The driver and fireman were thrown clear of the engine, suffering only minor injuries. The explosion was caused by the faulty manufacture of a section of the outer casing of the fire box. The locomotive was No. 23, and had been built in 1861 by Slaughter and Gruning & Co. of Bristol, England.

=== Windsor, 1882 ===
On 18 March 1882, a train which had terminated at Windsor station was run into at a fairly low speed by an express train heading for Brighton Beach station. The locomotive of the terminating train had already detached from its carriages, which were pushed 100 metres down the track in the collision. 20 passengers in the express train were injured, and two in the terminating train.

=== Tourello, 1882 ===
On 8 May, a train travelling from Maryborough to Ballarat collided at Tourello with a train travelling in the opposite direction. The accident occurred when the train from Maryborough was backing into a siding to allow the train to Maryborough to pass it, but the latter train did not stop before that manoeuvre had been completed. About half a dozen people were injured, the guard of the train from Maryborough most seriously.

=== Ringwood, 1894 ===
On the evening of Saturday, 20 January, the boiler of locomotive R297 exploded. The driver received a head wound and the fireman suffered from shock. They had been protected to some extent by the locomotive cab. A large piece of metal from the boiler was found 200 metres from the scene, an adjacent shed was demolished by the explosion, and the windows of nearby houses were shattered.

=== Tungamah/St James, 1897 ===
On 14 July 1897 'R' Class locomotive No.341 derailed on the Yarrawonga to Benalla line in northern Victoria. One passenger was taken to hospital with 'severe shock'.

=== Wickliffe Road, 1899 ===
On 3 July 1899, a mixed train was derailed. Only one of the twenty passengers on board complained of any injury.

=== Hawthorn, 1903 ===
On 20 May 1903, a stationary goods train at the Kew platform of Hawthorn station was struck by a passenger train from Kew. The guard of the goods train, who was connecting some wagons to his train, was knocked over, and the wheels of one of the wagons ran over his left leg. It was alleged that the driver of the train which caused the collision mistook the Camberwell signal, showing "line clear", for the Kew signal, which was at "danger"

=== Belgrave, 1906 ===
On 28 January 1906, an excursion train on the narrow gauge Upper Ferntree Gully-Gembrook line derailed on a curve about 3/4 mile (1.2 km) past Belgrave station. The locomotive and the first four cars came off the tracks, with the car closest to the locomotive partly turning over on its side. About 40 people were injured, eight of them seriously.

=== Ringwood, 1908 ===
On 11 February 1908 a locomotive attached to empty carriages, overshot a dead-end siding, demolished buffer stops and plunged down an embankment. Although both crew members jumped from the cab, the fireman was pinned beneath the locomotive and suffered several cuts and bruises.

=== McCallum's Creek Bridge, Dunach, 1909 ===
On 19 August 1909 an accident occurred on the rail bridge over McCallum's Creek at Dunach, between Clunes and Talbot on the Maryborough line. Flood waters had undermined one of the piers of the bridge and the deck collapsed as a mixed train crossed over it. One female passenger was injured.

=== Trawalla, 1910 ===
On 3 February 1910, the driver of the leading locomotive of a double-headed goods train was lucky to escape serious injury or death when his engine derailed and toppled on to a wood heap, while negotiating a set of points. The driver was thrown from the engine, which seemed to pass over him, and he suffered internal injuries, cuts and bruising. The accident was believed to have been caused by a loose dog spike.

=== Bochara, 1910 ===
On 7 September 1910, a goods wagon became derailed as a mixed train, running from Coleraine to Hamilton, approached the bridge over McKinnons Creek. Three vehicles, including the passenger carriage, toppled off the bridge, falling about 10 feet (3 m). 15 passengers were injured.

=== Molesworth, 1911 ===
On 26 September 1911 a mixed train derailed on the trestle bridge over Harvey's Gully, on the Tallarook-Mansfield line. A louvre van and a six-wheeled passenger carriage tumbled into the gully, with the body of the passenger car separating from its underframe. Sixteen people were injured.

=== Jolimont Junction, 1917 ===
Just after 7pm on 23 June 1917, in light mist, a train bound for Box Hill smashed into the rear of a stationary train heading for Kew, while approaching Richmond station. The locomotive of the Box Hill train penetrated the guard's compartment and three passenger compartments of the rear carriage of the Kew train. No-one was travelling in the three passenger compartments, and the guard of the Kew train was thrown clear by the impact, sustaining a broken leg. In all, thirteen people were injured.

=== Castlemaine, 1919 ===
On 10 June, the 6.25am Bendigo-Melbourne express derailed about 1 1/2 miles (2.4 km) north of Castlemaine. The locomotive toppled on to its side and the first three carriages slid down a 20 ft embankment. Fourteen people, including the conductor of the train, were injured. The accident was the result of the track spreading under a train travelling at full speed over rails that were being relaid, due to inadequate precautions being taken by the ganger involved.

=== St Arnaud, 1921 ===
On 24 May 1921 thick fog resulted in two goods trains colliding after the brakes failed on one of the trains. The crew of the trains were injured.

=== Koo-wee-rup, 1928 ===
On 24 December 1928, 54 passengers aboard a Korumburra-bound train were injured when the locomotive and four carriages of the train were clipped by the tender of the locomotive of an empty mixed train that was being assembled in a siding, but was inadvertently directed onto the main line via a set of points which were incorrectly operated by a porter.

=== Croydon, 1935 ===
Early on 10 February 1935, an empty electric passenger train was travelling from Ringwood to Croydon, prior to running a service from Croydon to the city. The driver had neglected to do a full brake test and, as the train descended the grade into Croydon station, the brakes failed to stop it. It went through the station and collided at about 60 mph (100 km/h) with a stationary electric train, standing in a siding in the station yard. Both trains were empty and the driver of the moving train jumped clear before impact. The crews of both trains suffered minor injuries and the Croydon fire brigade quickly extinguished a fire which had broken out.

=== Wangaratta, 1935 ===
Three men were injured and a number of freight wagons were derailed when a truck struck a goods train at the North Wangaratta level crossing on the afternoon of 19 April 1935. Two of the injured were riding illegally in one of the derailed freight wagons.

=== Little River, 1938 ===
At about 8 am on the morning of 30 May 1938, a passenger train and a goods train collided head-on, a few hundred metres south of Little River station. The goods train was standing on the main line, prior to reversing into a siding to provide a clear path for the passenger train on the single track. The crash forced the locomotive of the goods train over the top of the locomotive of the passenger train. None of the 16 people in the passenger train was hurt, but the driver and guard of the passenger train received superficial injuries. The crew of the goods train jumped clear before the impact.

=== East Malvern, 1951 ===
Just after 6 p.m. on 15 May 1951, three people were injured when a train from Glen Waverley collided with a train from Melbourne which had terminated at East Malvern station and was being shunted into No. 2 road to allow the Glen Waverley train to go through. The driver and one passenger on the Glen Waverley train were injured, as was the guard on the terminating train, which had no passengers at the time.

=== Broadmeadows and South Kensington, 1960 ===
On 15 September 1960, at Broadmeadows, steam locomotive R755, hauling a passenger train from Numurkah to Melbourne, ran into the rear of a goods train from Albury, hauled by diesel locomotives B85 and T333. The driver of the goods train was jolted out of his cab and the fireman jumped out when he saw that the collision was going to occur.

The impact of the crash broke the couplings between the fifth and sixth wagons of the goods train, and with the diesel locomotives still powering, what was left of the driverless goods train continued on its way. It travelled along the Broadmeadows to Albion goods line to Sunshine, where it was diverted on to another goods-only goods line. From there it continued through the Bunbury Street tunnel and negotiated a number of 40 km/h reverse curves, before being diverted by a signalman at South Kensington into a siding, where it collided with six goods wagons loaded with flour.

A few passengers on the Numurkah train were slightly injured. T333 was returned to service two days later and B85 nine days later, but R755 was scrapped.

=== Bungaree, 1971 ===
At 10:30 p.m. on Wednesday 30 August 1971, The Overland train from Melbourne to Adelaide, South Australia, derailed at Bungaree, 14 kilometres east of Ballarat. A number of the leading carriages jack-knifed across the tracks, although all but one remained more-or-less upright. Eight people were examined at Ballarat Hospital for bruising and shock, but none were admitted. The cause of the accident was believed to be a combination of a problem with one of the bogies of the locomotive and unevenness in the track at the point of derailment.

=== Ringwood East, 1997 ===
On 2 January 1997 a driver suffered severe head injuries when his car was struck by a train at the Dublin Road level crossing.

=== Syndal, 1989 ===
On 20 November 1989, two Commuter city bound trains collided at Syndal Station when one stationary train which had stopped and delayed due to door faults, was hit from behind by a second train which had stopped at a prior signal, but then continued onwards. 37 people were injured, there were no fatalities.

=== Preston, 1996 ===
A metropolitan train struck a semi-trailer stranded across a level crossing at Bell Street, injuring 15 people.

=== Hastings, 1996 ===
On 29 August, a 21-year-old man received head injuries when his car was struck by a Frankston to Stony Point train struck his career at the Cool Store Road, Hastings level crossing.

=== Broadmeadows, 1996 ===
On 14 November, thirteen people were injured when a train ran head-on into another train that was waiting for a signal near Jacana Station. All injured persons, including both drivers, were released from hospital after being treated for minor injuries. The incident was reportedly believed to have happened due to a city-bound train travelling through a red light.

=== Ballan/Gordon, 2003 ===
On 16 November 2003 more than 60 people were injured when a Ballarat-bound train was derailed after colliding with a car that had been deliberately left on the track.

=== Yarraville, 2007 ===
On 29 June 2007 two people were injured in a level crossing smash.

=== Craigieburn, 2010 ===
On 4 May 2010 a Metro train collided with an Apex quarry freighter (operated by Pacific National) stopped at a signal south of Craigieburn railway station. Five people were injured, three seriously.

=== Clayton, 2011 ===
On 1 November 2011 a man was hit by a train and injured at the railway station. Police believe the man was crossing the line between the two platforms when he was struck by an inbound train.

=== Croydon, 2012 ===
On 9 May 2012 a woman was taken to hospital after she was clipped by a peak-hour service train in Melbourne's east. Police believe the woman in her 30s was trying to cross the tracks at Croydon Station when she was struck about 6.30pm.

=== Galvin, 2014 ===
At about 7 p.m. on Friday 22 August, a seven-car VLocity DMU train, returning to Melbourne empty from Geelong, ran at low speed into the rear of a stationary Comeng electric train at the Cherry Creek bridge, a little more than a kilometre east of the site of the former Galvin railway station. There were about 40 passengers aboard the Comeng and four of them were taken to hospital with minor injuries. The only people on board the VLocity, the driver and a conductor, also received minor injuries.

=== Laverton, 2015 ===
On October 2, 2015, a train travelling to Flinders Street struck a track maintenance worker near Laverton station at approximately 9:16am. The worker suffered serious injuries as a result of the accident.

=== Ballarat, 2020 ===
On 31 May 2020, Vlocity DMU VL70 crashed through the heritage listed wooden level crossing at Ballarat. Pieces of the debris flew everywhere, causing 4 people on board to be rescued by paramedics.

== Other accidents ==
Up to 31 May 1952, there had been ten rail accidents in Victoria in the previous nine months. There is a lesser number identified on this list.

=== Lal Lal, 1892 ===
On 18 June 1892, the Adelaide Express ran into the back of a goods train on the Geelong-Ballarat railway line. The express, travelling from Melbourne via Geelong, caught up with a goods train about 2 1/2 miles (4 km) south of Lal Lal station. Before the collision occurred, the express had been travelling at about 40 mph (65 km/h) and the goods train at about 15 mph (25 km/h), although the driver of the express applied his brakes at "full emergency" when he saw the rear light of the goods train. The collision wrecked four empty open trucks on the goods train, and derailed another, but the only injury was to the guard of the goods train, who jumped clear moments before the crash.

=== Beech Forest, 1904 ===
On 4 October 1904, mischievous children put in motion a railway engine that the crew had left unattended to go for a drink at a nearby hotel. The children jumped from the moving train, which derailed.

=== Anderson, 1911 ===
In the early hours of Sunday, 28 May, two double-headed coal trains collided at Anderson station. The sound of the smash could be heard from quite a distance. The two leading locomotives, D^{D}626 and D^{D}598, were derailed, as was one of the assisting W-class locomotives. The D^{D}s had their buffers torn off, and the leading bogie of D^{D}598 was detached from the loco. No-one was injured because the engine crews had seen the collision was imminent and jumped clear. It was determined that the driver of one of the trains had overrun the signals during shunting operations at Anderson station.

=== Arcadia, 1912 ===
On 14 November 1912, the locomotive of the 6.15 p.m. passenger train from Seymour to Numurkah struck the locomotive of a livestock train at Arcadia railway station, near Shepparton. The livestock train was shunting in the station yard, but its engine was fouling the points on to the main line as the passenger train passed. The engine of the passenger train was derailed, along with three carriages. There were about 45 passengers on board (another report says about 70) and some of them suffered slight injuries.

=== Donald, 1917 ===
On 24 November 1917, passengers aboard a mixed train from Maryborough escaped injury after the train collided with a goods train head-on at Donald in the early hours of the morning.

=== Serviceton, 1945 ===
On 26 September 1945, one engine crashed into the side of another in the Serviceton yard.

=== Lascelles, 1945 ===
In the early morning of 21 November 1945, the Mildura Express and a goods train collided head on at Lascelles. Locomotive A^{2}878 was written off as a result.

=== Riddell, 1947 ===
On 1 July 1947, on a foggy morning, a Bendigo-Melbourne goods train crashed into 38 goods wagons which had broken away from a preceding train and were obstructing the line near Riddell station (now Riddells Creek). Although the guard of the stranded section of the preceding train had placed detonators on the line, the following train smashed into the obstructing wagons. The locomotive of the second train fell down a 20-foot (6 m) embankment. None of the train crews involved were seriously injured, but about 100 sheep were killed. Locomotive A^{2}904 was scrapped as a result of the damage it sustained.

=== Laverton, 1952 ===
On the night of 31 May, locomotive N453, hauling a newspaper train to Geelong, ran into the rear of a stationary goods train at the Drome crossing loop. The locomotive overturned, and many goods wagons were derailed and damaged.

=== Werribee, 1979 ===
On 11 October 1979, a wheat train derailed and some wagons ploughed into the station building, partly demolishing it, and causing $2 million worth of damage.

=== Spencer Street, 1987 ===
On 13 January 1987, the second carriage of a train derailed and struck a pillar and another power line.

=== Hoppers Crossing, 1995 ===
On 18 March 1995 a V/Line train collided with a bus parked across tracks. The bus driver had reportedly stopped on tracks while running a metropolitan train replacement, unaware that regional trains were still running. Passengers were cleared from the bus shortly before impact.

=== Richmond, 2000 ===
On 31 March 2000, a Hitachi train derailed near Richmond station. The fourth car in the six-carriage train heading from Flinders Street, 173M, derailed over a set of points due to a cracked wheel.

=== Holmesglen, 2000 ===
On 26 July 2000, an empty city-bound suburban train crashed into a stationary train at Holmesglen Station.

=== Footscray, 2001 ===
On 5 June 2001, two suburban trains collided at Footscray Station.

=== Epping, 2002 ===
On 18 June 2002, two Connex suburban trains crashed head-on at Epping railway station when a driver, incapacitated by a migraine, went through a stop signal.

=== Spencer Street, 2003 ===
On 3 February 2003, a runaway M>Train operated Comeng suburban train travelled the length of the Broadmeadows line before smashing into a stationary V/Line train at Spencer Street Station.

=== Chiltern, 2003 ===
On 16 March 2003 a Sydney to Melbourne standard gauge freight train derailed at Chiltern, fouling the adjacent broad gauge line. Due to poor communication between train control centres, a V/Line service was not warned in enough time and struck the wreckage, although with no serious injuries.

=== Spencer Street, 2003 ===
On 12 November 2003 a stationary Bendigo-bound V/Line Sprinter diesel railcar was hit by another V/Line train at Spencer Street.

=== Tottenham, 2008 ===
At about 15:15 hours on 30 January 2009, northbound freight train 6MB2, owned and operated by Pacific National, derailed near the beginning of a left-hand curve located near the 8.915 track km point in Tottenham, Victoria. In total, eight wagons derailed and about 400 metres of timber-sleepered track was damaged. Damage to rolling stock was minimal and there were no injuries as a result of the occurrence.

=== Winton, 2008 ===
At approximately 20:30 hours on 31 July 2008, freight train 5WX2 derailed near Winton (between Glenrowan and Benalla). The derailment occurred about 10 track km north of Benalla. Thirteen freight wagons were derailed but there were no injuries.

=== Wodonga, 2011 ===
At approximately 07:10 hours on 23 October 2010, 15 wagons on freight train 3PW4 derailed near Wodonga, Victoria. There were no injuries but serious damage to rolling stock and rail track (including the superstructure of a bridge) was sustained during the derailment.

=== Footscray, 2011 ===
On 26 November 2011 the Melbourne to Albury train, carrying more than 100 passengers, derailed at Footscray. The engine and two carriages came off the track.

=== Footscray, 2013 ===
On 29 November 2013 a Pacific National Goods Train en route from Mildura to the Port of Melbourne derailed, with a number of wagons leaving the track near West Footscray Railway Station. The accident caused disruptions to interstate and intrastate freight traffic in and out of the Port of Melbourne. The derailment location was almost identical to the Footscray 2011 derailment only on this occasion the train was not a passenger service.

=== Inverleigh, 2022 ===
On 14 November 2022 an SCT manifest freight train number 4PM9 derailed at Inverleigh in Western Victoria. The accident caused disruptions to interstate and intrastate freight traffic in and out of the Port of Melbourne at the same time rail traffic between NSW and South Australia was also closed by significant flooding in NSW.

=== Clifton Hill, 2025 ===
On 13 July 2025 at about 22:30, the Metro Trains Melbourne passenger train travelling from Mernda Station to Flinders Street Station derailed and collided with stanchions carrying overhead wires, resulting in substantial damage to the overhead infrastructure. About 100 metres of track and one passenger car were also significantly damaged.

=== Newport, 2025 ===
On Saturday 20 December 2025, SCT Logistics freight train 5BM9, led by CSR024, CSR021 and ACD6059 derailed on the switch from the Brooklyn Line (Newport to Sunshine) to the Williamstown Shuttle Sidings (MTM) after excessive buff forces between cars caused PQDY 39Y to jump the tracks, The derailed bogie on an empty flat car PQDY 39Y dragged past Newport station, causing ballast to fall into the underpass and caused significant damage to the second gauge splitter on the down end of Newport Station. The derailment blocked the Western Line for multiple days. (Locomotives remained on the track)

== See also ==
- Director, Transport Safety
- List of disasters in Australia by death toll
- Lists of rail accidents
- Rail Safety Act
