= Railway accidents in Western Australia =

This article is concerned with railway accidents occurring in Western Australia, where they are identified as fatal accidents, injury related accidents, or where infrastructure or rolling stock was damaged.

== Fatalities ==
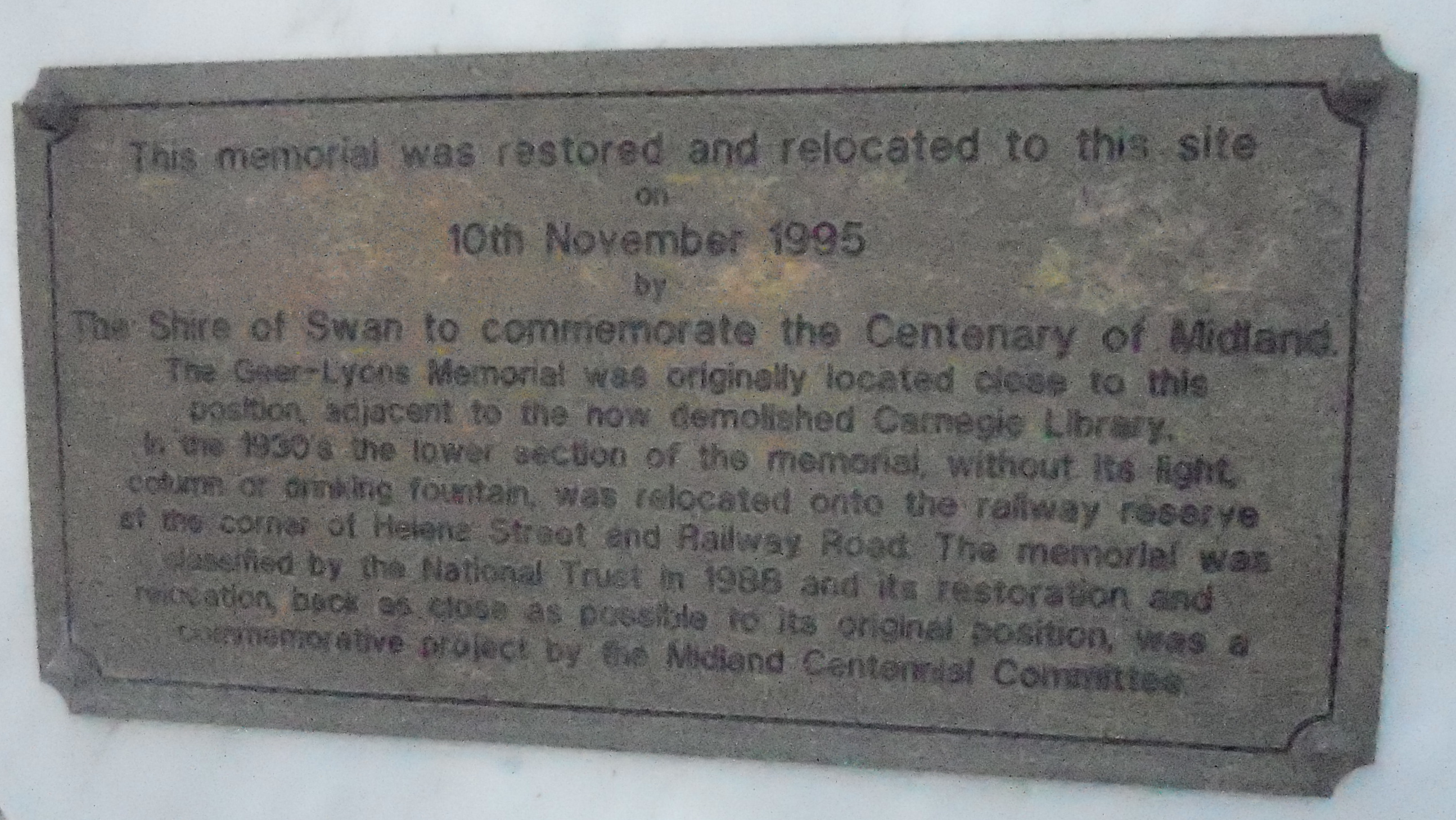
Memorial plaque for Greer and Lyons in Midland

=== Poison Gully (Bellevue), 1904 ===
On 1 August 1904, a goods train running from Midland Junction to Pickering Brook derailed on a washed out bridge across Poison Gully. The driver and fireman were killed. A memorial to the crew is in Midland.

=== Gunyidi, 1917 ===
On 24 July 1917, three people were killed and thirteen injured when the mail train from Perth to Geraldton derailed 2 miles (3.2 km) north of the siding at Gunyidi on the Midland railway line. One small child was killed on impact when the passenger carriages telescoped into the luggage van, while her mother and another man received severe injuries and died at the scene within hours. A coronial inquest found that excess rain and the absence of appropriate culverts had resulted in a washaway of the tracks.

=== Wokalup (Mornington Mills), 1920 ===
On 6 November 1920, nine people were killed and two were injured in a timber train crash involving the locomotive the Jubilee, which was travelling from Mornington Mills to Wokalup.

=== Korrelocking (Wyalkatchem), 1928 ===
On 21 August 1928, a mixed train from Merredin derailed near Korrelocking, four miles before Wyalkatchem. One passenger died and seven were injured.

=== Roelands, 1951 ===
On 13 February 1951, driver William Wakeham was crushed to death under a load of quarry stone when the trucks telescoped as the locomotive while running tender–first jumped the rails on a curve and struck the side of a cutting. The fireman and the guard jumped before the crash and were injured. The train, which was operated by the Public Works Department, was travelling to the new Bunbury harbour works when it got out of control.

=== Hines Hill, 1996 ===
On 14 January 1996 two people were killed when two freight trains collided at a crossing loop in Hines Hill. One of the fatalities was the driver. The other was a young boy.

=== Jumperkine, 2019 ===
At about 0200 (WST) on 24 December 2019, a freight train (operated by Pacific National) collided with the rear of a grain train (operated by Watco) at Jumperkine, Western Australia. The freight train locomotive cabin was substantially damaged and the driver fatally injured.

== Accidents with injuries only ==
=== Mundijong, 1968 ===
On 20 April 1968 two crew were injured when two shunting engines collided with a goods train.

=== Zanthus, 1999 ===
On 18 August 1999, 20 people were injured when the Indian Pacific hit a stationary freight train 250 km east of Kalgoorlie at Zanthus.

=== Kalgoorlie, 2007 ===
On 14 May 2007 a southwest-bound mineral train collided with a southeast bound motor vehicle that was traversing the Chapple Street level crossing in Kalgoorlie. The driver of the car sustained minor injuries, the train drivers were uninjured. Investigators established that the crossing flashing lights, bells and boom gates did not operate at the time of the accident.

=== Golden Ridge, 2009 ===
At approximately 1031 on Friday 30 January 2009, freight train 5PS6, operated by Pacific National (PN), derailed near Golden Ridge, about 43 km east of Kalgoorlie in Western Australia. The two locomotives, the crew van and 18 wagons (including 7 multiple platform freight wagons) derailed. There were only minor injuries to the train crew as a result of the derailment. However, there was significant damage to the derailed rolling stock and about 200 m of track was destroyed.

=== Jaurdi, 2011 ===
At about 1308 on 28 March 2011 a collision involving freight train 7SP3 and a track mounted excavator occurred near Jaurdi. The train driver sustained a minor injury. There was moderate damage to the lead locomotive and the excavator, and minor damage to the track as a result of the incident.

=== Haig, 2012 ===
At about 1720 WST on 24 May 2012, two road/rail vehicles collided at Haig WA which is on the Nullarbor Plain (1330 km from Coonamia SA and about 280 km west of the WA/SA border). Initial reports indicate that a track worker was seriously injured when one road/rail vehicle was in the process of taking-off the rail track at Haig and a road/rail truck from the same maintenance crew collided with it. Another track worker was injured but not seriously.

== Other accidents ==
=== Jarnadup, 1920 ===
On 5 July 1920 a train was derailed when the track spread. Aboard the train was Prince Edward (the future King of England – King Edward VIII). The last two carriages (the Prince was in the last carriage) toppled over a 1.5 metre embankment. The Prince was unhurt.

=== Stewart, 2007 ===
At about 0400 on 17 August 2007, the 48th wagon of Australian Railroad Group iron ore train 6413 derailed on a right-hand curve in a cutting 595.9 km from Perth in the Stewart to Bonnie Vale section of the Defined Interstate Rail Network in Western Australia. Thirty one wagons in total were derailed and 25 of those wagons were seriously damaged. There were no injuries. The track sustained significant damage and was closed for 4 days.

=== Hines Hill, 2008 ===
At about 14151 on 10 March 2008, train 6MP9 was carrying containerised general freight from Melbourne to Perth when it derailed 11 wagons near Hines Hill in Western Australia. Although there were dangerous goods on the train, they were not involved in the derailment.

=== Loongana, 2008 ===
At about 1655 on Tuesday 11 November 2008, freight train 2PM6 derailed on the Nullarbor Plain approximately 11 km west of Loongana in Western Australia. There were no injuries as a result of the derailment but there was significant damage to rolling stock and track.

=== Moorine Rock, 2009 ===
At about 1501 on 23 March 2009, freight train 7GP1 collided with a school bus after the bus drove onto, and became stuck on, an excavated section of railway track at the Nulla Nulla South Road level crossing near Moorine Rock, Western Australia. There were no injuries as a result of the collision but there was significant damage to the school bus.

=== Goddards Siding, 2010 ===
At about 1603 on Tuesday 28 December 2010, freight train 1MP5 derailed on the Trans Australian Railway Line approximately 240 km east of Kalgoorlie in Western Australia. There were no injuries as a result of the derailment but there was significant damage to rolling stock and track.

== See also ==
- Lists of rail accidents
