= Railway accidents in Queensland =

This is a list of significant railway accidents in Queensland, Australia.

== Fatal accidents ==
=== Toowoomba, 1913 ===
On 1 January 1913, six people were killed and six injured. The people killed were working at the scene of an earlier derailment.

There are varying reports of two rail accidents in (near) Toowoomba in 1913. These come from lists of major accidents compiled by some newspapers in the 21st century. One claimed accident is for 1 January 1913 where it is claimed six people were killed. The other is for 30 January 1913 where it is claimed 14 people were killed. The only reasonably cited reference is to an accident at Murphys Creek (near Toowoomba) on 30 January 1913 (see entry below) where six people are reported as being killed. There is no verifiable citation for fourteen people being killed in an accident near Toowoomba in 1913.

=== Murphys Creek, 1913 ===
On 30 January 1913, six people were killed, when a goods train had left Toowoomba on the night of 29 January 1913, and had derailed near the Murphys Creek railway station on the Main line, about one mile from the station yard limits, on the range side near the 84-mile (139 km) mark. No members of the crew were injured, but a considerable amount of damage was caused to the goods vehicles and the track. A breakdown gang was sent from Toowoomba and breakdown trains were also despatched from Brisbane and Toowoomba to clear wreckage from the line. The spot where the derailment had taken place was in a relatively inaccessible area and workers had to prise the wreckage apart. Several trips were made by breakdown trains to the derailment site.

At 9:35 am on 30 January 1913, a special train left Holmes railway station to collect passengers from the 6:30 am Brisbane train and the Sydney mail train (departed Brisbane 7:50 am). The relief special consisted of nine empty coaches, two covered wagons, and two C16 Class engines attached to the front and rear of the train. On the first part of the journey down the range, the train was under control. Mr Hallam said a guard rode on the leading engine to advise the crew of the location of the derailed stock train. The guard and fireman on the lead engine saw a glimpse of the wrecked train through the trees. However, no warning devices (detonators, or red flags) had been deployed to warn the approaching train of the breakdown train's position. The only indication was a warning which was shouted from about 70 metres from the breakdown van by a workman on the line. The driver of the relief special had made several air brake applications on the way down without recharging brake reservoirs. The driver then made an "injudicious" application of the Westinghouse brake and was unable to stop his train. The engine propelled by 226 tons (230 tonnes) of combined weight behind its tender collided with the rear of the breakdown train.

The breakdown van, engine and tender were all driven forward 3.5 metres. The engine collided with an "H" wagon that was being re-railed which, in turn, was driven forward into another five goods wagons. Members of the rescue gang, who had been working on the "H" wagon, were crushed beneath the wreckage. An additional breakdown train was sent to the crash site from Toowoomba at 10:00 am. Fifty workers dug frantically in the wreckage to free trapped workers, however six had died due to horrific injuries received in the collision.

The driver was found to not have approached the scene of the derailment with "the caution demanded of him", according to the initial departmental inquiry, and that the guard of the breakdown train had failed to adequately protect the rear of it.

=== Humphery, 1918 ===
On 1 June 1918, one man was killed and two women were seriously injured following this collision between a cattle train and a mixed goods on 1 June 1918 at Humphery railway station, 20.2 km from Mundubbera on the Mungar Junction to Monto railway line. The collision crushed the guard's van and telescoped a passenger carriage, fatally injuring one of its occupants.

=== Kuranda, 1918 ===
On 25 November 1918, there were two fatalities and one injury when a 'light engine' ran out of control at the top of the Barron Gorge, 2 km ('a mile and a quarter') from the Kuranda railway station. The engine and tender derailed on a sharp curve and hit a rock wall, the engine falling on its side, causing the boiler to burst and the firebox to be torn open. The driver and fireman, Thomas Patrick Duignan, 27, and Evan William Whiting, 22, were thrown clear but suffered severe injuries and extensive burns. The guard, James Foley, also received serious injuries. The injured men were evacuated by trolley to Redlynch and then taken on a breakdown train to the Cairns District Hospital. Whiting and Duignan survived long enough the reach the hospital but died soon afterwards.

=== Traveston, 1925 ===
On 9 June 1925, ten people were killed in a derailment of the Rockhampton Mail train on a high timber trestle bridge near Traveston on the North Coast railway line. Ten people were killed and 48 injured when a passenger car and the luggage van plunged off the bridge, and another passenger car was pulled on its side. It resulted in baggage cars being specially built for passenger trains and ended the use of certain types of goods vehicles on passenger trains.

=== Tully, 1931 ===
On 22 May 1931, a man was killed whilst walking along the North Coast railway line between Tully railway station and Banyan bridge, He was run into by the southern-bound Cairns mail train, sustaining a compound, commuted fracture of both ankles and a probable fracture of the skull. He died whilst being conveyed by the Tully Ambulance to the Tully General Hospital.

=== Moselle, 1938 ===
On 1 December 1938, three people were killed near Moselle siding east of Richmond on the Great Northern railway line. A train carrying concentrates from Mount Isa collided with a light train heading west. Two engine drivers and a fireman were killed in the collision.

=== Alpha, 1941 ===
On 8 April 1941, two people were killed near Alpha. The locomotive, tender and two wagons of a goods train from Emerald plunged through a section of the wooden rail bridge over Alpha Creek.

=== Marrawing, 1944 ===
On 15 December 1944, one person was killed.

Two almost new locomotives were destroyed and many ballast and freight waggons damaged when a "B18¼" class loco collided with a Standard Garrett G51 class loco at Marrawing, 29 km south of Gladstone on the North Coast railway line. The tender of the "B18¼" telescoped into the loco, and the following ballast waggons were piled up on top of it. Wagons further back derailed and rolled down an embankment, ripping up line and sleepers. The driver of the "B18¼" ballast train was injured and died at the scene. The smash caused long delays for regular Townsville and Rockhampton trains bound for Brisbane in the days following the accident before the line was repaired. The two engines were written off at a cost of £100,000 (1944 values = $200,000).

Both locomotives, ASG G51 and B18 1/4 903, were repaired and returned to service. G51 was sold for scrap in 1955 while 903 was finally written off in 1970.

=== Tamaree, 1947 ===
On 18 October 1947, eight people were killed and twenty-two injured in a mail train collision at Tamaree north of Gympie.

=== Camp Mountain, 1947 ===
On 5 May 1947, sixteen people were killed and 38 injured. The accident occurred at approximately 9:48 am when a crowded picnic train derailed on a sharp left-hand curve between Ferny Grove and Camp Mountain stations on the now-closed Dayboro line, approximately 15 km (9.3 mi) northwest of Brisbane.

=== Wallumbilla, 1956 ===
On 1 December 1956, five people were killed and 100 injured.

This accident occurred when the 'Westlander' crashed into the 'Western Mail' at Wallumbilla, near Roma, SW Qld (467 km west of Brisbane). The two trains were intended to cross at the station. However, the 345-tonne Westlander passed through a danger signal without slowing and hit the 200-tonne mail train head-on, pushing it back 46 metres, and derailing both engines and many carriages. Passengers were thrown about and many aboard the mail train were injured by smashed timber in the broken carriages. Ten passengers were admitted to hospital. The Westlander had steel carriages that saved its passengers from any serious injury.

=== Bogantungan (Medway Creek), 1960 ===
On 26 February 1960, seven people were killed and 43 injured.

The railway bridge over Medway Creek near Bogantungan (100 km from Emerald) collapsed after an uprooted gum tree (estimated to weigh 12 tonnes) struck and dislodged one of the pylons as it was swept downstream by floodwaters. The bridge then collapsed as the Rockhampton-bound Midlander passed over it, resulting in 7 dead and 43 injured. The leading engine made it across the bridge and derailed on the other side, however, the C class second engine, the power van, and three passenger sleeping cars fell 7.6 meters into the Creek. The four passengers who died were in these cars, with the other fatalities being three train crewmen.

=== Duaringa, 1968 ===
On 7 November 1968, two people were killed.

A coal train driver and a fireman were killed when their train collided with a mixed passenger/goods train in Duaringa, Queensland. The assistant station master at Duaringa was charged with unlawful killing and a manslaughter trial was held in the Rockhampton Supreme Court in March 1969.

The Duaringa station master was due to give evidence at the trial. However, his body and the bodies of his wife and their two children were found at their Duaringa home in an apparent murder suicide on the eve of the trial.

=== Trinder Park, 1985 ===
At around 6:45 am on Saturday 23 March 1985, two Brisbane suburban trains collided head-on near Trinder Park station on Brisbane's south side. Two people died, including the driver of the south-bound train, and 31 were injured. The incident occurred due to both services accidentally travelling concurrently on the single track section of the Beenleigh line, despite the operation of a remote controlled signalling system. The north-bound signal at Trinder Park station was reportedly red at the time.

=== Bindango, 1987 ===
At about 5.30 a.m. on Friday 6 November 1987, Cunnamulla-bound Westlander train 3V02 was derailed at the nearby Bindango railway siding between Hodgson and Muckadilla, approximately 25 kilometres (16 mi) west of Roma. An infant was burnt to death in the resulting fire. Investigations revealed that the points had been deliberately changed from the main railway line to divert the train into the siding. The police offered a reward of $50,000 for information leading to the person responsible.

=== Hervey Bay, 1988 ===
On 1 April 1988, three people were killed and 33 injured when a bus collided with a train at a level crossing near Hervey Bay.

=== Rungoo, 2008 ===
At 1447 on Thursday 27 November 2008, the northbound Cairns Tilt Train (CTT) collided with a loaded B-double truck at the Rungoo level crossing, about 19.5 km north of the township of Ingham in north Queensland. On board the CTT were 81 passengers and seven train crew. The truck driver was the sole occupant of the B-double truck. The two train drivers were fatally injured as a result of the collision, the truck driver sustained moderate injuries. In addition, injuries were incurred by nine passengers.

=== Mundoo, 2009 ===
On 1 January 2009, one person was killed, when The Sunlander passenger train and a garbage truck collided at a crossing at Mundoo near Innisfail in far north Queensland. The 40-year-old truck driver was killed and six people were injured, including three pregnant women.

=== Moranbah, 2010 ===
At about 10.35am on 8 July 2010, a man was killed after his car struck an empty coal train at a level rail crossing on the Goonyella railway line.

=== Wynnum West, 2021 ===
At 13:39 on 26 February 2021, a Queensland Rail suburban express passenger train on the Cleveland Line was approaching the Kianawah Road level crossing when it collided with a motor vehicle. The vehicle was destroyed and the sole occupant was fatally injured and the only 2 occupants of the train, the driver and guard were not injured. An ATSB investigation found that although all safety systems were operational at the time of the accident, the boom barrier did not meet the Australian standard (AS 7658) or Queensland Rail's own level crossing safety standard as there was a 3.1 metre gap between the tip of the lowered boom barrier and the median island on the northern side of the level crossing. The report also concluded that, "Queensland Rail had not been managing risk at level crossings in accordance with the requirements of its level crossing safety standard" and "The standard stated that public and pedestrian level crossings were to be assessed every 5 years or sooner. However, the Kianawah Road level crossing had not been assessed for 19 years". This was due to Queensland Rail having just one person qualified to assess all public, pedestrian, private, maintenance and construction level crossings which numbered in the thousands.

== Accidents with injuries only ==
=== Toowoomba, 1916 ===
On 24 May 1916 an examiner in the railway department, Toowoomba, had the first finger of the right hand jammed in the Westinghouse brake on a carriage. The finger was badly crushed, and would likely have to be amputated.

=== Eudlo, 1933 ===
On 13 October 1933, the Townsville mail train, bound for Brisbane with 144 people on board, crashed head on into a stationary goods train at Eudlo Station. Passengers were hurled from their sleeping berths by the impact, and the screams of terrified travellers mingled with the tearing and grinding of crumpling wood and twisted steel. The fireman of the express was badly cut about the face and legs and an elderly lady sustained abrasions and shock but otherwise no casualties occurred.

=== Beerburrum, 1994 ===
On 28 July 1994, Queensland Rail electrically hauled freight trains C351 (northbound from Moolabin to Townsville) and C740 (southbound from Townsville to Acacia Ridge) collided head on at the 63 km point on the North Coast line on the (then) single line section between Beerburrum and Elimbah, about 1 km south of Beerburrum. The two drivers, who were the only crew, were injured as a result of the collision and were hospitalized for a period. Extensive damage was caused to the locomotives, other rolling stock and other infrastructure. The train locomotive of C740, 3902, was scrapped. The locomotive on C351, 3901, was less badly damaged and was returned to service.

=== Berajondo, 2004 ===
At 2355 Eastern Standard Time on 15 November 2004, the diesel tilt train, City of Townsville, VCQ5, derailed 419.493 km from Brisbane (Roma Street), north of Berajondo on the Bundaberg to Gladstone line. VCQ5 derailed on the first of the 60 km/h curve speed restrictions while travelling at a recorded speed of 112 km/h.

No fatalities were recorded, but injuries were recorded to over 100 people, including staff:

- Sixteen passengers suffered severe physical injuries with a predicted recovery time greater than three months;
- Ten passengers suffered moderate physical injuries with a predicted recovery time between one and three months;
- Seventy one passengers suffered minor physical injuries with a predicted recovery time under one month.
- The driver suffered severe physical injuries.
- The co-driver suffered minor physical injuries.
- Of the onboard staff, one female member suffered severe burns/scalding.
- The remaining staff members sustained minor physical injuries.

Investigators found that the train had been travelling at 112 km/h - almost double the 60 km/h speed limit - and one of the two drivers had been making coffee when it crashed.

=== Aloomba, 2011 ===
On Wednesday 21 December 2011 7PM, an incident on board the northbound Sunlander service involving a 5-year-old child occurred. The child strayed away from his mother who he was travelling with, and managed to open the door of the LBL Class Carriage by activating the non-locked door. The child then slipped and fell onto the ground outside of the train while the service was moving. It is reported that at the time the Sunlander was travelling between 15 and 23 KPH. The child was left behind as the train continued heading north. The child was noticed by motorists on the Bruce Highway, adjacent to the rail corridor. The locking mechanism on the LBL, 'L Class Carriages' did not comply with safety standards. This prompted safety upgrades on the L Class Carriages which are now in full effect.

=== Banyo, 2012 ===
On Friday 14 September 2012 at about 6:30 am, a heavy vehicle became grounded on the rail level crossing at St Vincents Road, Banyo. The vehicle was carrying a 38.5 tonne, 3.65-metre-high electrical transformer on a low loader trailer.

The driver of the heavy vehicle exited the cab with the intention to raise the low loader clear of the crossing. He was assisted by a member of the public who entered the rail corridor. A southbound passenger train was stationary at Banyo station at the time.

At about 6:32 am the member of the public noticed an approaching northbound passenger train and alerted the heavy vehicle driver. The two men began to run from the rail corridor as the northbound train collided with the heavy vehicle.

The collision split the heavy vehicle combination apart and the heavy vehicle driver sustained serious injuries as a result of being struck by the low loader. The driver of the northbound train suffered minor injuries.

The northbound train derailed on impact and suffered moderate damage to the lead unit. The stationary southbound train received minor damage and the heavy vehicle combination was extensively damaged. The collision caused extensive damage to the rail infrastructure and resulted in significant delays to train services.

=== Cleveland Station, 2013 ===
At about 0940 on 31 January 2013, a Queensland Rail passenger train (T842) failed to stop at the Cleveland station platform and collided with the end-of-line buffer stop, the platform and the station building at a speed of about 31 km/h. There were 19 people on board the train (including the driver and a guard); three people were on the platform and five were in the station building.

A number of people were treated for minor injuries and transported to hospital for further examination.

Passengers, standing and seated, in forward and rearward facing seats sustained various minor injuries during the deceleration and collision sequence. The injuries ranged from muscle strain to a shoulder/arm while holding onto the hand rails and bracing for impact, bruising from impact with seat frames and a minor cut when a passenger's head struck a poster frame near the driver's cabin. Both the driver and guard sustained superficial injuries.

=== Stratford, 2014 ===
On Wednesday 9 April 2014 at about 8:45 am, a white Mazda and the Kuranda tourist train collided at a level crossing in Stratford, Cairns, The driver of the car, believed to be aged in his 50s, was cut free from the wreckage at about 9:35 am and taken to Cairns Base Hospital with head and pelvic injuries.

=== Runcorn, 2025 ===
On Thursday 14 August 2025 at about 6:53am, a Citybound Doomben express (coming from the Gold Coast), collided with a B-Double truck whose trailer was stuck on the railway line at Bonemill Road in Runcorn. No major injuries reported from Passengers other than shock, whiplash and a sore back. Both Drivers were treated at the scene for shock. No injuries reported from either driver.

== Accidents without injuries ==
=== Laidley, 1964 ===
On 31 July 1964 a goods train collided with the rear of a derailed goods train on the Main Line at Laidley.

=== Charters Towers, June 1965 ===
On 2 June 1965 The east bound passenger train named "The Inlander" travelling from Mount Isa to Townsville hit a car that was stalled on a washed-out rail crossing just west of Charters Towers, named Wellington. The crossing was situated near the Dalrymple Sale Yard. The mother, Catherine Emily Stevens (28 years old), and two young daughters, Catherine Marie Stevens (4 years old) and Juanita Lynette Stevens (8 months old) who were travelling in the car all survived. Catherine Emily and Juanita had the only injuries. Mrs Stevens had been travelling to collect her husband Matthew John Stevens for lunch when the car stalled with its front wheels over the first track. Mr Stevens was working on a nearby property and saw the entire accident unfold.

=== Hatfield (Black Mountain), 1994 ===
On 17 November 1994, an electrically hauled freight train derailed on the Goonyella railway line near Hatfield railway station.

=== Petrie, 2001 ===
On 21 September 2001, electric-hauled cattle train C0N0 hit and destroyed EMU units number 05 and 60 in the northern siding at Petrie, after the driver fell asleep at the controls. 1 carriage from unit 05 and 2 carriages from unit 60 were salvaged to make a new EMU 60, which was in service until November 2018. 3906 was repaired and returned to service, later to be converted to a 3500 class coal unit numbered 3556.

== See also ==
- List of rail accidents
