= Railway accidents in the Northern Territory =

== Fatal accidents ==
=== Pine Creek, 2011 ===
On 5 October 2011 a man was killed after his car collided with a freight train. The collision happened at a rail crossing near the entrance to the Pine Creek Mango Farm, about 200 kilometres south of Darwin. The accident happened at a crossing that has no lights.

== Accidents with injuries only ==
=== Camel Creek (Rodinga), 1936 ===
On 29 February 1936 a fireman was injured when a work train left Rodinga and travelled onto a bridge that had been undermined. The engine dived nose-first into the creek.

=== Elizabeth River, 2006 ===
At about 1205 (CST) on 20 October 2006, a double trailer road-train truck drove into the path of a south bound freight train (6DA2) at a level crossing near the Elizabeth River Bridge, NT. The locomotive drivers sustained minor injuries while the truck driver was uninjured.

=== Ban Ban Springs, 2006 ===
At approximately 1356 on 12 December 2006, a double trailer truck drove into the path of The Ghan passenger train (1AD8) at the Fountain Head Road level crossing, Ban Ban Springs, Northern Territory. As a consequence, two locomotives, a wagon used for carrying passengers' private vehicles and nine passenger carriages derailed. There were no fatalities, however, the road-train driver and a female passenger were hospitalised and several other passengers and crew sustained minor injuries.

The truck driver involved was arrested, according to the NT police, charged and found guilty of a number of charges related to the accident.

=== Katherine, 2011 ===
A fully laden freight train travelling from Adelaide to Darwin is derailed at the Edith River crossing, north of Katherine on 27 December 2011. The derailment occurred as a result of flooding due to waters from ex-Tropical Cyclone Grant. Out of a crew of two, one was injured. The main engines made it across the Edith River bridge but several of the carriages were washed off.

== Other accidents ==
=== Katherine, 2008 ===
At approximately 1310 on 4 November 2008, freight train (3DA2), operated by FreightLink Pty Ltd, derailed about 6 km west of Katherine in the Northern Territory as a result of a track misalignment. Six wagons derailed and sustained minor damage and about 1,300 m of track was destroyed. There were no injuries.

=== Manton Dam, 2008 ===
At about 0542 on Tuesday 22 April 2008, empty southbound manganese ore train 3DM4 derailed four wagons approximately 58 km south of Darwin near Manton Dam in the Northern Territory (NT). There were no injuries as a result of the derailment but there was minor damage to the track and rolling stock.

== See also ==
- Lists of rail accidents
