= List of rail accidents in South Korea =

This is a list of the most serious South Korean rail-related accidents.

== 20th century ==
=== 1940s ===
- 1948 Daejeon train crash: About 15 miles (24 km) north of Daejeon, a passenger train crashes into the rear of another train; 40 people were killed and nearly 60 injured, most of them U.S. troops.

=== 1950s ===
- 1954 Suwon–Osan train crash: A passenger train crashes into an empty freight car between Suwon and Osan, killing 57 people and injuring at least 100.

=== 1970s ===
- 1976 Seoul train collision: At a level crossing in Seoul, a train collided with a tanker truck carrying flammable liquid, killing 20 people.

=== 1980s ===
- 1981 Busan–Seoul train collision: An express from Busan to Seoul was stopped after hitting a motorcycle on a level crossing at Daegu. The local train following then collided with the express; killing 54.

=== 1990s ===
- 1993 Mugunghwa-ho train disaster: a Mugunghwa-ho train in the vicinity of Gupo station in Busan rolled over due to subsidence under a section of track caused by nearby construction, killing 78 people and injuring 198, making it the worst rail accident in South Korea.

== 21st century ==
=== 2000s ===
- Daegu subway fire: A mentally ill man started a fire which engulfed two subway trains, killing 192 people.

=== 2010s ===
- 2012 Busan Subway collision: A Busan Subway train rear-ended another train, injuring 40.
- 2014 Seoul subway crash: A Seoul Metro train collided with another train due to ATS failure while stopping at Sangwangsimni Station. 388 were injured, of them 24 severely.
- 2016 Yeosu train derailment: A passenger train derailed near Yulchon station, Yeosu, probably due to excessive speed, killing person and injuring eight.

=== 2020s ===
- 2022 KTX train derailment: A KTX train headed from Busan to Seoul derailed in the central part of the country, injuring seven.
- 2022 Korail train derailment: In Seoul, a Korail train heading to Iksan station in North Jeolla Province derailed, injuring 30 people.
- 2025 Cheongdo train crash: In Cheongdo, a passenger train hit a group of rail workers conducting inspection works on a slope near the tracks following heavy rains, killing two and injuring four.

== Sources ==
- Semmens, Peter (1994). Railway Disasters of the World: Principal Passenger Train Accidents of the 20th Century. Patrick Stephens Ltd. ISBN 1-85260-323-2.
