= Fiumarella rail disaster =

1961 train crash in Calabria, Italy

Coordinates: 38°55′48″N 16°34′25″E

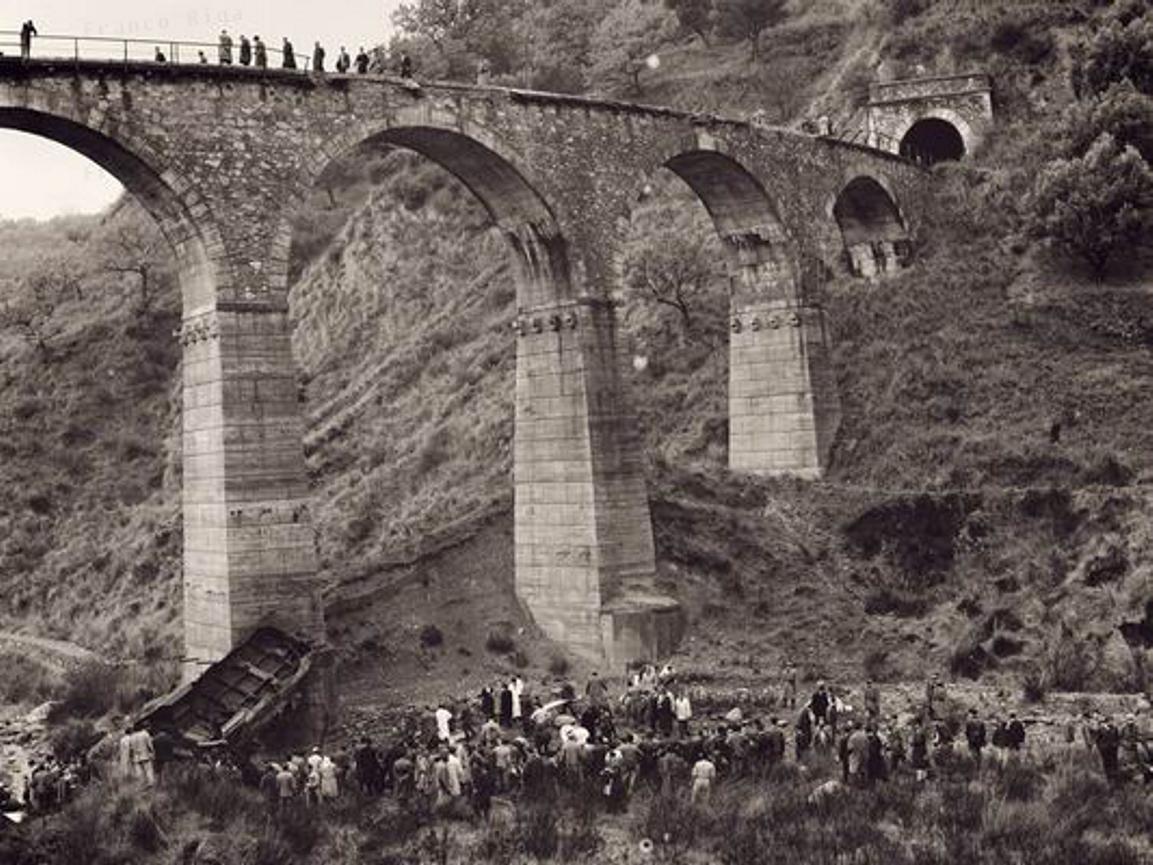

Details
- Date: 23 December 1961; 64 years ago
- Location: Fiumarella viaduct
- Country: Italy
- Line: Cosenza–Catanzaro
- Operator: Società per le Strade Ferrate del Mediterraneo
- Incident type: Derailment and fall to the valley floor
- Cause: Derailment and rupture of the coupling

Statistics
- Trains: 1
- Deaths: 71
- Injured: 28

The Fiumarella rail disaster was one of the most serious incidents in the history of the Italian railways. It occurred at about 7:45 a.m. on 23 December 1961, at the Fiumarella viaduct, near Catanzaro, in the region of Calabria, southern Italy.

== History ==
The train involved in the disaster was composed of Breda M2.123 class diesel railcar and Breda trailer RA 1006.

The crash happened as the train was passing over the curved Fiumarella viaduct, about an hour after departing from Soveria Mannelli for Catanzaro at 6:43 a.m. The trailer derailed from the track, due to the rupture of the tram type draw hook, and plunged into the river below after a falling about 40 m (131 ft). Inside the trailer there were 99 passengers, many of them students. Seventy-one of them lost their lives on impact, and 28 others were injured.

The conclusions reached by the Commission of Inquiry were that the derailment and subsequent rupture of the traction hook had been caused by excessive speed (63 km/h) compared to the 35 km/h allowed due to the poor condition of the armament in the stretch in question.

== Consequences ==
On 2 April 1966 the Catanzaro court sentenced the driver to 10 years in prison, found guilty of speeding; the defense of the driver had argued that the speed was excessive due to the malfunction of the brakes.

The incident sparked a parliamentary debate, which led the Italian Government to revoke operating rights for Mediterranea Calabro Lucane on the line and appoint a Managing Government Commissioner. Rail traffic on the line remained disrupted for years, and between Catanzaro and Soveria Mannelli it was temporarily replaced by road vehicles.

At Decollatura, place of origin of a substantial number of the victims, a monument was erected in memory of the fallen.

== Gallery ==
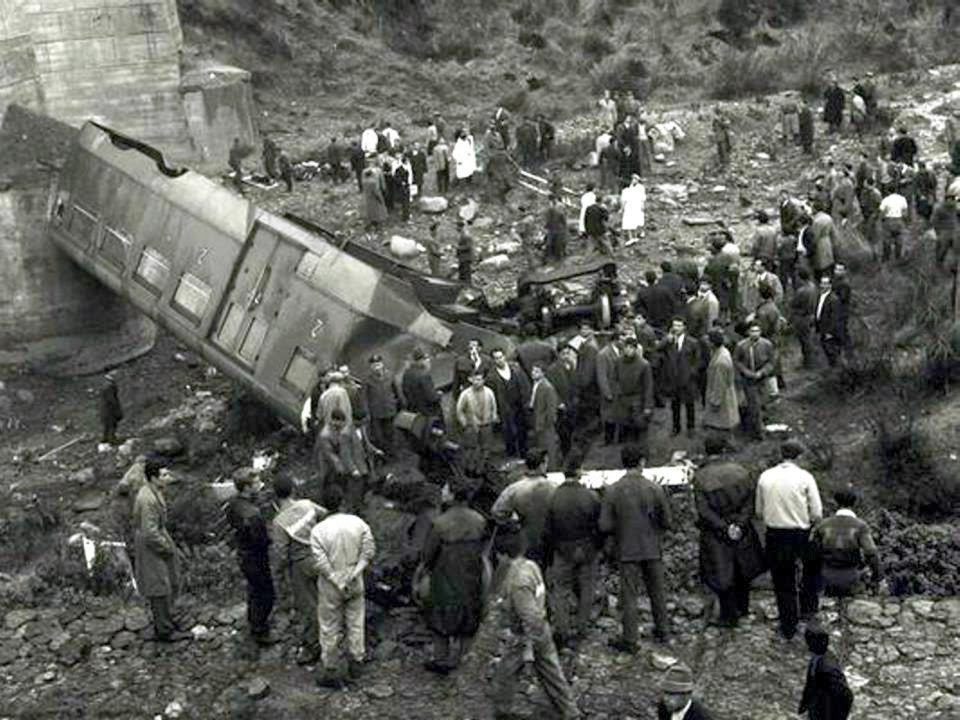
The crashed trailer

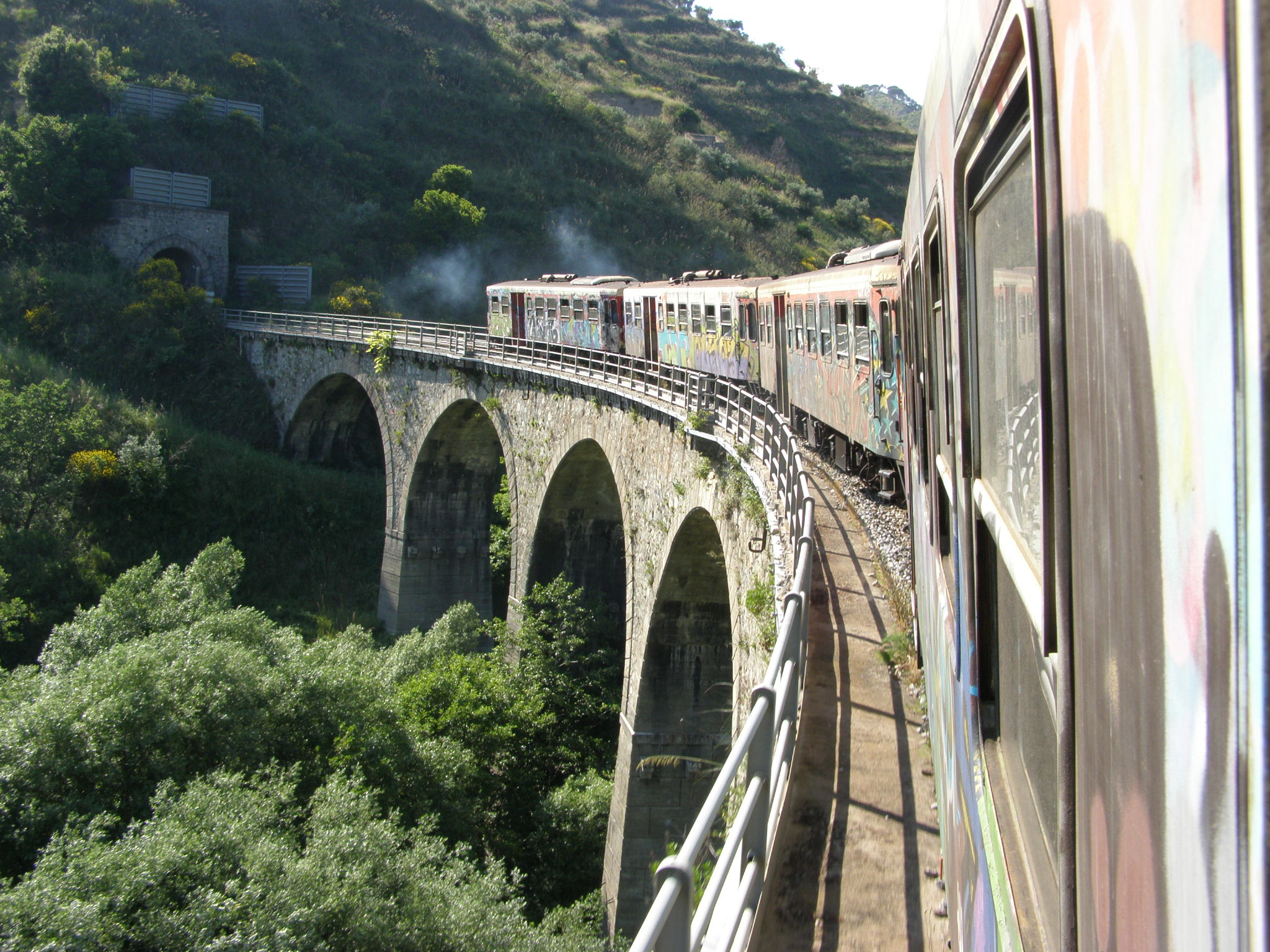
The viaduct today
