= Monzuno =

- Comune
- Comune di Monzuno
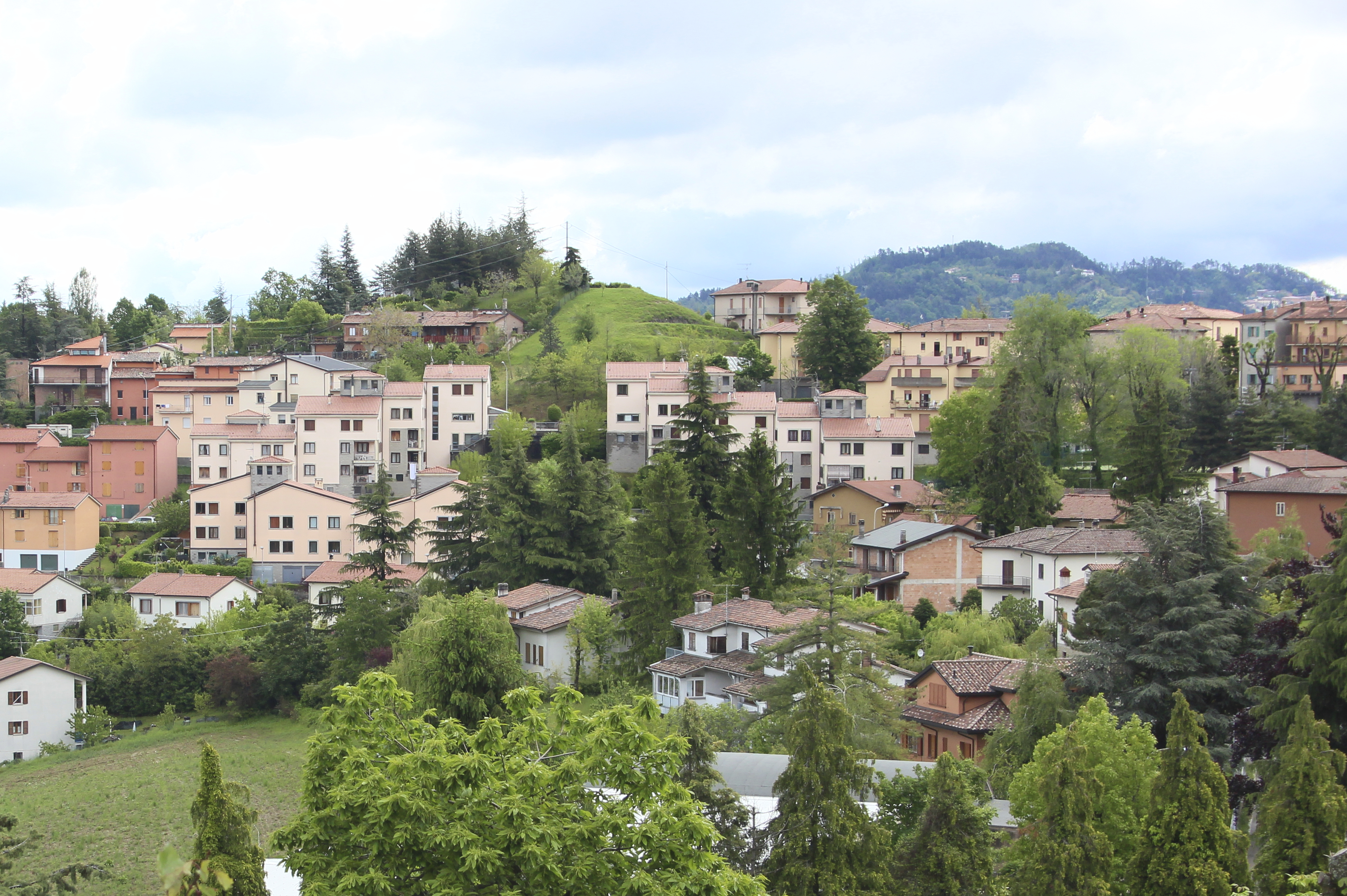
- Monzuno

- Coat of arms

- Location within Italy Location within Emilia-Romagna
- Coordinates: 44°17′N 11°16′E
- Country: Italy
- Region: Emilia-Romagna
- Metropolitan city: Bologna (BO)
- Frazioni: Bologna, Brento, Ca' di Giulietta, Carbonarolo, Gabbiano, La Trappola, Lodole, Montorio, Pian di Lama, Rioveggio, San Niccolò, San Rocco, Selve, Trasasso, Vado, Valle

Government
  - Mayor: Marco Mastacchi

Area
  - Total: 65 km^{2} (25 sq mi)
- Elevation: 621 m (2,037 ft)

Population (30 November 2017)
  - Total: 6,359
  - Density: 98/km^{2} (250/sq mi)
- Time zone: UTC+1 (CET)
  - Summer (DST): UTC+2 (CEST)
- Postal code: 40036
- Dialing code: 051
- Patron saint: St. Louis
- Saint day: Last Sunday in August
- Website: Official website

Monzuno (Bolognese: Munżón) is an Italian comune in the Metropolitan City of Bologna (Emilia-Romagna).

The territory of the commune is located on the western slope of the Savena valley, on the northern ridge of Monte Venere and on the left side of the Setta and Sambro streams.

== History ==
In the 12th century Monzuno was under the rule of the Marquises of Tuscany. After the Lombard overlords, it passed over to the possession of the Ubaldinis and afterwards was handed over to Matilde di Canossa. It was finally divided among the noble families of the Da Monzuno, Da Montorio and Da Panico.

Under the rule of Matilde of Canossa, the Castle was part of the court of Scanello and then ceded to the Church of Pisa. Later it acquired independence under the local lordship that had branched out perhaps from the Ubaldinis. The Da Monzunos won the Da Montorios and sought for help from the church circles, taking sides with the Geremeis (who were Guelphs) against the Lambertazzi (Ghibellines). However, during the crisis they showed their true political colors, lining up with nobles to the detriment of the middle class. The Bolognese on the other hand perfectly knew the political shadiness of the noble house and hence tried to appoint them with offices and posts ensuring to contain their power. In 1371, Bologna obtained the subjugation of Monzuno and of the Castle of Aligrano. However, as the Ghibellines of Bologna plotted to open the city's door to the Marquis Niccolò II d'Este, Guiduccio da Monzuno took sides in favour of the insurgents and decided to support the Lambertazzis. Bologna replied with resolution and sent infantry and cavalry to occupy the castle. Monzuno became a commissariat at the end of the 15th century, under the rule of Giovanni II Bentivoglio. The district was afterwards handed over in 1514 to the Manzoli family and then to the Dukes of Acquasparta.

In 1810 the commune of Monzuno was established, to which also the hamlets of Trasasso, Brigola, Gugliara, Vado, Monterumici, Brigadello, Brento, Valle di Sambro, Gabbiano, Montorio and Rioveggio were incorporated. The most recent history marks a large insurgent movement after the fall of fascism, during World War II with Mario Musolesi, better known as Il lupo ("The wolf"), leader of the partisan fraction of Stella Rossa (Red Star).

== Brento ==
Brento was a possession of the king and, as such, it was donated by the Lombard king Astulf to the Duke Orso and from the latter to the Abbey of Nonantola. Afterwards it was reintegrated into the possessions of the Bishop of Bologna. After the 11th century the decline of the place commenced. In 1293 the Bishop of Bologna donated the Church of Brento to the fathers of Bologna. In the fourteenth century in Monzuno the Vicariate of the Mountain was active in Monzuno. The community of monks that settled there scattered after 1632. The old Parish Church was destroyed by the events of the war.

== Montorio ==
The hamlet of Montorio was the centre of a wide Church district long before Monzuno acquired its own administrative right. It was an institution of 42 parishes that were afterwards dismembered. In 1582 Cardinal Gabriele Paleotti established the new Parish of Monzuno. Montorio belonged at first to the local Feudal Lords, then to the Counts Castelli of Bologna. The latter ones donated to the Military Order of S. Stefano di Toscana, in order to take part in it, the Palace of Montorio. The Grand Duke of Tuscany accepted and established the Priorate of Bologna, entrusting its administration to the Castellis. Afterwards the possessions were handed down to the Count Francesco di Thurn di Valsassina, to the Marullis of Bologna and in the end to the Bertis.

== People ==
- Mario Musolesi, partisan
- Fio Zanotti, composer and record producer

== Culture ==
=== Vado di Brutto ===
Every year, generally in the second Sunday of May, a mountain biking event entitled Vado di Brutto takes place in the fraction of Vado, taking advantage of existing Club Alpino Italiano (CAI) routes around Monte Sole. After the first two editions in 2014 and 2015, respectively attracting 305 and 438 bikers, the event became part of only four national events sponsored by UISP (Unione Italiana Sport per Tutti).

=== Chef al Massimo ===
Commemorating famous local butcher Massimo Zivieri, who died at the age of 37, this is a culinary event involving chefs from all over the country. Started in 2011, over 2,000 invitees between local and international chefs, and people from all over the country participate in what has become one of the year's most renowned events in Monzuno.
