= List of disasters in Italy by death toll =

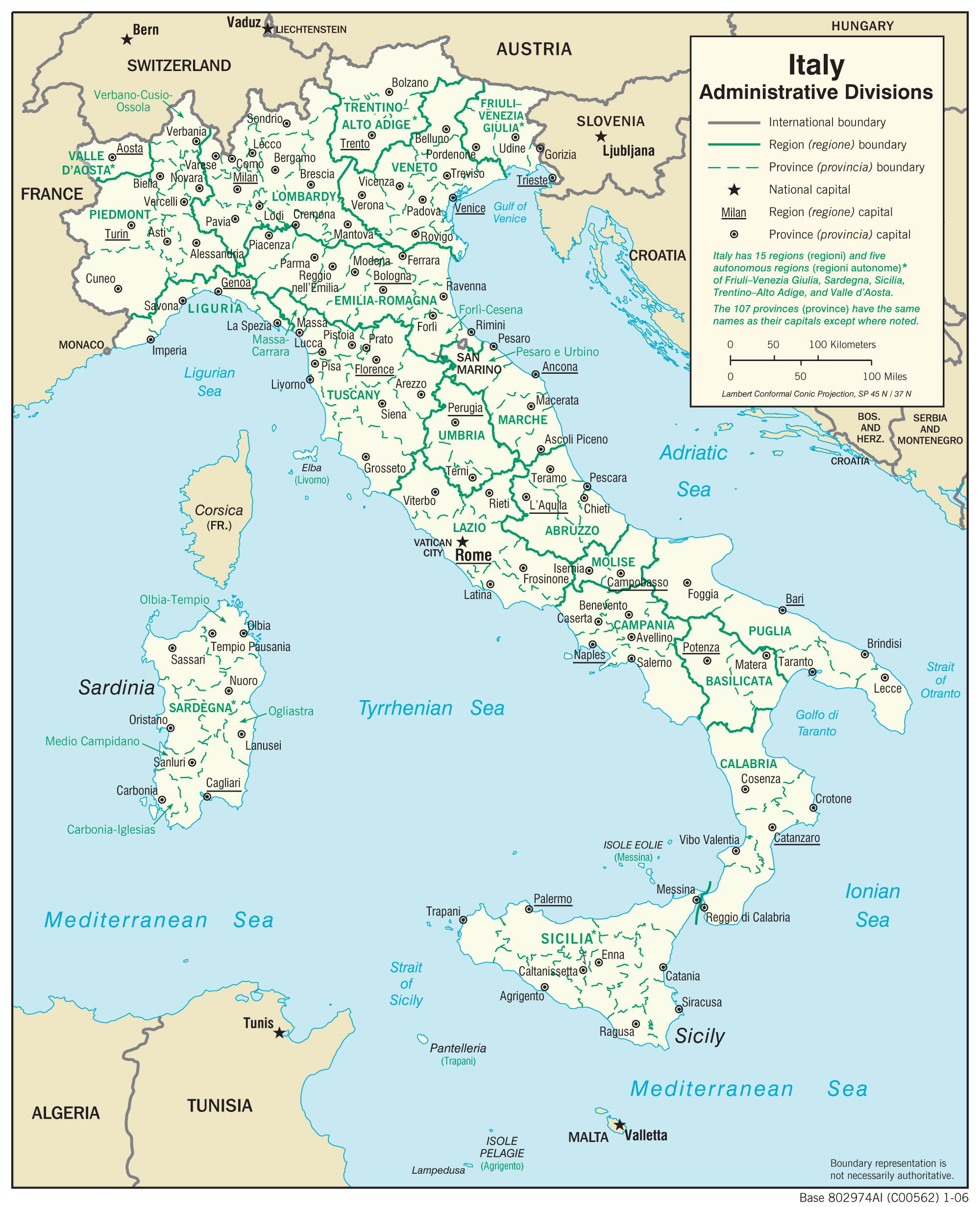
Map of Italy and its divisions

This list of Italian disasters by death toll includes major disasters (excluding acts of war) that occurred on Italian soil or involved Italian citizens, in a definable incident. This list only includes disaster that occurred after the 1861 proclamation of the Kingdom of Italy, and as such disasters such as the eruption of Mount Vesuvius in 79 AD are not included.

== over 500 deaths ==
Fatalities	Year	Article	Type	Location	Comments
400,000-600,000	1918-1920	Spanish Flu pandemic in Italy	Pandemic	Nationwide	
198,523	2020-2024	COVID-19 pandemic in Italy	Pandemic	Nationwide	
75,000-82,000	1908	1908 Messina earthquake	Earthquake	Sicily and Calabria	
~50,000	1884-1887	1881–1896 cholera pandemic	Pandemic	Nationwide	
30,519	1915	1915 Avezzano earthquake	Earthquake	Province of L'Aquila, Abruzzo	
48,356	1982-ongoing	HIV/AIDS in Italy	Pandemic	Nationwide	
~2,500	1963	Vajont Dam disaster	Dam collapse	Vajont river valley in Friuli-Venezia Giulia and Veneto	
2,483	1980	1980 Irpinia earthquake	Earthquake	Campania, Basilicata, and Apulia	
2,313-3,100	1883	1883 Casamicciola earthquake	Earthquake	Ischia, Metropolitan City of Naples, Campania	
1,404	1930	1930 Irpinia earthquake	Earthquake	Campania, Basilicata, and Apulia	
990	1976	1976 Friuli earthquake	Earthquake	Friuli-Venezia Giulia	
~600	1887	1887 Liguria earthquake	Earthquake	Province of Imperia, Liguria	
562	1891	Sinking of the SS Utopia	Shipwreck	Gibraltar	Sank en route from Trieste to New York, virtually all passengers on board were Italian emigrants.
558	1905	1905 Calabria earthquake	Earthquake	Calabria	
517	1944	Balvano train disaster	Train disaster	Balvano, Province of Potenza, Basilicata	

== 100 to 499 deaths ==
Fatalities	Year	Article	Type	Location	Comments
356	1923	Gleno Dam disaster	Dam failure	Province of Bergamo, Lombardy	
318	1954	1954 Salerno flood	Flood	Province of Salerno, Campania	
314	1927	SS Principessa Mafalda	Shipwreck	Atlantic Ocean off of Brazil	
309	2009	2009 L'Aquila earthquake	Earthquake	Province of L'Aquila, Abruzzo	
299	2016	August 2016 Central Italy earthquake	Earthquake	Central Italy	
293+	1906	Sinking of the SS Sirio	Shipwreck	Mediterranean Sea off of Spain	Italian steamship carrying Italian and Spanish emigrants to South America. 622 of the 697 on board were Italians. The official death toll was 293, however there was an unknown number of stowaways on board as well.
281	1916	Pagliari explosion	Explosion	La Spezia, Province of La Spezia, Liguria	
268	1985	Val di Stava dam collapse	Dam collapse	Tesero, Trentino, Trentino-Alto Adige (Trentino-Alto Adige/Südtirol)	
247	1919	San Spiridione disaster	Ship explosion	Venice, Metropolitan City of Venice, Veneto	
231-400	1968	1968 Belice earthquake	Earthquake	Sicily	
229	2009-2010	2009 swine flu pandemic	Pandemic	Nationwide	
216	1906	1906 Mount Vesuvius eruption	Volcanic eruption	Campania	
171	1920	1920 Garfagnana earthquake	Earthquake	Tuscany	
167	1907	1907 Calabria earthquake	Earthquake	Metropolitan City of Reggio Calabria, Calabria	
161	1998	1998 Sarno and Quindici landslides	Landslides	Provinces of Salerno, Caserta, and Avellino, Campania	
~150	1922	Falconara explosion	Explosion	Lerici, province of La Spezia, Liguria	
140	1991	Moby Prince disaster	Ship collision	Ligurian Sea off of the Province of Livorno, Tuscany	
137	1943	Caltanissetta Xirbi tragedy	Train collision	Caltanissetta, Province of Caltanissetta, Sicily	No investigation was done into the crash as it was during war-time. Whether it was sabotage or not is unknown.
118	2001	2001 Linate Airport runway collision	Runway collision	Metropolitan City of Milan, Lombardy	
115	1972	Alitalia Flight 112	Plane crash	Mount Longa, Metropolitan City of Palermo, Sicily	
111	1935	Zerbino dam disaster	Dam collapse	Orba Valley, Province of Alessandria, Piedmont	
108	1978	Alitalia Flight 4128	Plane crash	Tyrrhenian Sea	
108	1951	The Polesine flood of November 1951	Floods	Province of Rovigo and the Metropolitan City of Venice, Veneto	
100	1919	1919 Mugello earthquake	Earthquake	Mugello, Metropolitan City of Florence, Tuscany	

== 10 to 99 deaths ==
Fatalities	Year	Article	Type	Location	Comments
~94	1962	Alitalia Flight 771	Plane crash	Junnar, Maharashtra, India	While the exact number isn't known the vast majority of passengers and all of the crew on board the aircraft were Italian nationals
81	1980	Itavia Flight 870	Plane disaster	Tyrrhenian Sea	Cause of crash highly contested
80	1873	1873 Alpago earthquake	Earthquake	Provinces of Belluno, Treviso and Pordenone, Veneto	
72	1968	1968 Piedmont flood	Flood	Province of Vercelli, Piedmont	
71	1961	Fiumarella rail disaster	Train derailment	Province of Catanzaro, Calabria	
~70	1945	Baschi train accident	Train collision	Province of Terni, Umbria	
69	1994	1994 Tanaro flood	Flood	Provinces of Cuneo, Asti and Alessandria and the Metropolitan City of Turin, Piedmont	
69	1959	TWA Flight 891	Plane crash	Olgiate Olona, Province of Varese, Lombardy	
67	1999	Via Giotto in Foggia building collapse	Building collapse	Foggia, Province of Foggia, Apulia	
64	1963	Cinema Statuto fire	Building fire	Turin, Metropolitan City of Turin, Piedmont	
64	1962	Voghera train crash	Train disaster	Voghera, Province of Pavia, Lombardy	
58	1959	Via Canosa in Barletta building collapse	Building collapse	Barletta, Province of Barletta-Andria-Trani, Apulia	
56 (Italians)	1965	Mattmark avalanche	Avalanche	Visp District, Valais, Switzerland	
55	1917	Venzan landslide	Landslide	Panchià, Trentino, Trentino-Alto Adige (Trentino-Alto Adige/Südtirol)	
54 (Italians)	2004	2004 Indian Ocean earthquake and tsunami	Earthquake and tsunami	Southeast Asia	54 Italian tourists were killed in the disaster, primarily in Thailand
54	1946	Torre Annunziata disaster	Explosion	Torre Annunziata, Metropolitan City of Naples, Campania	
53	1987	Val Pola landslide	Landslide	Valdisotto and Tartano, Province of Sondrio, Lombardy	
52	1971	1971 RAF Hercules crash	Plane crash	near Meloria, province of Livorno, Tuscany	
50	1910	1910 Irpinia earthquake	Earthquake	Province of Avellino, Campania	
49	1948	1948 Piedmont flood	Flood	Provinces of Asti and Cuneo, Piedmont	
49	1995	Banat Air Flight 166	Plane crash	Sommacampagna, Province of Verona, Veneto	
49	1964	TWA Flight 800	Plane crash	Fiumicino, Metropolitan City of Rome Capital, Lazio	
48	1925	Sinking of the Sebastiano Veniero	Submarine accident	Mediterranean Sea off of Sicily	
48	1947	Sinking of the Annamaria	Shipwreck	Albenga, Province of Savona, Liguria	
46 (Italians)	1956	Sinking of the SS Andrea Doria	Shipwreck	Atlantic Ocean off of Massachusetts	
45	1964	Alitalia Flight 45	Plane crash	Ercolano, Metropolitan City of Naples, Campania	
44	1977	Monte Serra plane crash	Plane crash	Monte Serra, Province of Pisa, Tuscany	
43	2018	Ponte Morandi collapse	Bridge collapse	Genoa, Metropolitan City of Genoa, Liguria	
43	1954	Ribolla mine tragedy	Mine explosion	Ribolla, Roccastrada, Province of Grosseto, Tuscany	
42	1978	Murazze di Vado train disaster	Train accident	Monzuno, Metropolitan City of Bologna, Emilia-Romagna	
41	1971	Heleanna fire	Ship fire	Adriatic Sea off of the Province of Brindisi, Apulia	
40	2013	2013 Monteforte Irpino bus crash	Bus crash	Province of Avellino, Campania	
40	1917	Arquata Scrivia train accident	Train derailment	Arquata Scrivia, province of Alessandria, Piedmont	
40	1893	Limito railway disaster	Train collision	Pioltello, Metropolitan City of Milan, Lombardy	
38	1974	Itavia Flight 897	Plane crash	Caselle Torinese, Metropolitan City of Turin, Piedmont	
37	2018	Storm Adrian	Storm	Nationwide	
37	1987	Aero Trasporti Italiani Flight 460	Plane crash	Lasnigo, Province of Como, Lombardy	
37	2009	2009 Messina floods and mudslides	Mudslides	Metropolitan City of Messina, Sicily	
36	1970	1970 Padua-Venice tornado	Tornado	The Province of Padua and the Metropolitan City of Venice, Veneto	
36	1939	Torre Annunziata train accident	Train accident	Torre Annunziata, Metropolitan City of Naples, Campania	
35	1983	Nervi disaster	Bus crash	Genoa, Metropolitan City of Genoa, Liguria	
35	1982	Palazzo del Vignola fire	Building fire	Todi, Province of Perugia, Umbria	
35	1970	1970 Genoa flood	Flood	Metropolitan City of Genoa, Liguria	
35	1954	BOAC Flight 781	Plane crash	Mediterranean Sea	
35	1966	1966 flood of the Arno	Flood	Province of Florence, Tuscany	
33	1988	Uganda Airlines Flight 775	Plane crash	Fiumicino, Metropolitan City of Rome Capital, Lazio	
32	2009	Viareggio train derailment	Train derailment	Viareggio, Province of Lucca, Lombardy	
32	2012	sinking of the Costa Concordia	Shipwreck	Isola del Giglio, province of Grosseto, Tuscany	
31	1952	1952 Hunting Air Travel crash	Plane crash	Bivona, Province of Agrigento, Sicily	
31	1949	Superga air disaster	Plane crash	Superga, Metropolitan City of Turin, Piedmont	
31	1979	Aero Trasporti Italiani Flight 12	Plane crash	Capoterra, Province of Cagliari, Sardinia	
31	1958	British European Airways Flight 142	Mid-air collision	Nettuno, Metropolitan City of Rome Capital, Lazio	
29	2017	Rigopiano avalanche	Avalanche	Farindola, Province of Pescara, Abruzzo	
29	2002	2002 Molise earthquakes	Earthquake	Molise and Apulia	
29	1955	Sabena Flight 503	Plane crash	Monte Terminillo, Province of Rieti, Lazio	
29	1945	Prat da l'Ors powder magazine explosion	Explosion	Chiusaforte, Province of Udine, Friuli-Venezia Giulia	
28	1942	Nocera Inferiore train accident	Train accident	Nocera Inferiore, province of Salerno, Campania	
28	1980	Curinga train disaster	Train accident	Curinga, province of Catanzaro, Calabria	
27	1917	Sant'Osvaldo disaster	Explosion	Udine, province of Udine, Friuli-Venezia Giulia	
27	2012	2012 Northern Italy earthquakes	Earthquake	Emilia-Romagna	
27	1972	Aero Trasporti Italiani Flight 327	Plane crash	Corato, Metropolitan City of Bari, Apulia	
27	1998	Collapse of Via di Vigna Jacobini 65	Building collapse	Rome, Metropolitan City of Rome Capital, Lazio	
26	1944	1944 Mount Vesuvius eruption	Volcanic eruption	Metropolitan City of Naples and province of Salerno, Campania	
26	1953	1953 Mediterranean Sea mid-air collision	Mid-air collision	Strait of Sicily	
25	1918	Tuscan-Emilian Apennines earthquake	Earthquake	Tuscany and Emilia-Romagna, particularly the Province of Forlì-Cesena	
25	1920	Train collision over the Venetian Lagoon	Train collision	Ponte della Libertà, Venetian Lagoon, Veneto	
25	1889	Quartu flood of 5 October 1889	Flood	Quartu Sant'Elena, Metropolitan City of Cagliari, Sardinia	
24-33	1971	1971 Tuscania earthquake	Earthquake	Province of Viterbo, Lazio	
24	1955	Morgnano disaster	Mining disaster	Spoleto, province of Perugia, Umbria	
24	1930	1930 Montello Tornado	Tornado	Province of Treviso, Veneto	
23	2016	Andria–Corato train collision	Train collision	Andria, province of Barletta-Andria-Trani, Apulia	
23	2000	2000 Piedmont flood	Flood	Piedmont	
23	1921	Magliana railway accident	Train collision	Magliana Station, Rome, Metropolitan City of Rome Capital, Lazio	
22	2023	2023 Venice bus crash	Bus crash	Marghera, Metropolitan City of Venice, Veneto	
22	1953	Benevento train accident	Train derailment	Benevento, Province of Benevento, Campania	
21	1956	Monte Giner air crash	Plane crash	Ossana, Trentino, Trentino-Alto Adige (Trentino-Alto Adige/Südtirol)	
21	1960	Misrair Flight 738	Plane crash	Elba, province of Livorno, Tuscany	
20	1998	1998 Cavalese cable car crash	Plane collision	Cavalese, Trentino, Trentino-Alto Adige (Trentino-Alto Adige/Südtirol)	
20	1917	1917 Valtiberina earthquake	Earthquake	Tiber Valley in Tuscany and Umbria	
20	1949	1949 Benevento flood	Flood	Province of Benevento, Campania	
20	1900	Castel Giubileo train disaster	Train collision	Rome, Metropolitan City of Rome Capital, Lazio	
19	1936	1936 Cansiglio earthquake	Earthquake	Provinces of Belluno, Treviso and Pordenone, Veneto	
19	1953	Sinnai plane crash	Plane crash	Sinnai, Metropolitan City of Cagliari, Sardinia	
19	1990	1990 Carlentini earthquake	Earthquake	Sicily	
18	2013	2013 Sardinia floods	Floods	Olbia, Province of Gallura North-East Sardinia, Sardinia	
18	1935	Sinking of the Curzola	Shipwreck	Mediterranean Sea off of Sicily	
18	1930	1930 Senigallia earthquake	Earthquake	Senigallia, Province of Ancona, Marche	
18	1995	1995 Eastern Sicily storm	Storm	Metropolitan City of Catania, Sicily	Includes 12 deaths on board the Greek ship Pelhunter
17	2023	2023 Emilia-Romagna floods	Floods	Emilia-Romagna	
17	1960	Monza train accident	Train accident	Monza, Province of Monza and Brianza, Lombardy	
17	2005	Crevalcore train crash	Train collision	Crevalcore, Metropolitan City of Bologna, Emilia-Romagna	
17	1962	1962 Irpinia earthquake	Earthquake	Province of Avellino, Campania	
16	2005	Tuninter Flight 1153	Plane crash	Mediterranean Sea near Sicily	
16	1934	Piombino railway accident	Train collision	Piombino, province of Livorno, Campania	
15+	1936	Contigliano train accident	Train collision	Contigliano, province of Rieti, Lazio	
15	1957	Codogno rail crash	Train accident	Codogno, Province of Lodi, Lombardy	
15	1945	1945 Avro York crash	Plane crash	Mediterranean off of Lampedusa, province of Agrigento, Sicily	
15	1912	Guardia Mangano train accident	Train accident	Acireale, Metropolitan City of Catania, Sicily	
15	1930	Sasso Bolognese railway accident	Train accident	Sasso Marconi, Metropolitan City of Bologna, Emilia-Romagna	
14-17	1919	1919 Verona Caproni Ca.48 crash	Plane crash	Verona, province of Verona, Veneto	
14	2021	Stresa–Mottarone cable car crash	Cable car accident	Mottarone, Province of Verbano-Cusio-Ossola, Piedmont	
14	1996	1996 Versilia flood	Flood	Versilia, province of Lucca, Tuscany	
14	1979	Cercola train accident	Train collision	Cercola, Metropolitan City of Naples, Campania	
13	1990	Sinking of the Espresso Trapani	Shipwreck	Trapani, Province of Trapani, Sicily	
13	1962	Castel Bolognese train disaster	Train derailment	Castel Bolognese, Province of Ravenna, Emilia-Romagna	
13	1987	Elisabetta Montanari disaster	Ship disaster	Ravenna, province of Ravenna, Emilia-Romagna	
13	2022	2022 Marche floods	Floods	Marche	
13	2011	2011 Vara and Magra Valley Floods	Flood	Provinces of La Spezia and Massa-Carrara, Tuscany	
13	1903	Codroipo train accident	Train collision	Codroipo, province of Udine, Friuli-Venezia Giulia	
12	1989	Crotone train accident	Train accident	Province of Crotone, Calabria	
12	1933	1933 Maiella earthquake	Earthquake	Maiella, Abruzzo	
12	1967	Battipaglia train accident	Train collision	Battipaglia, province of Salerno, (Campania)	
12	1991	Pavillon avalanche	Avalanche	Courmayeur, Aosta Valley	
12	1990	1990 Italian Air Force MB-326 crash	Plane crash	Casalecchio di Reno, Metropolitan City of Bologna, Emilia-Romagna	
12	2022	2022 Ischia landslide	Landslide	Ischia, Metropolitan City of Naples, Campania	
12	1968	Alitalia Flight 660	Plane crash	Vergiate, province of Varese, Lombardy	
11	1946	Monte San Primo avalanche	Avalanche	Bellagio, province of Como, Lombardy	
11	2022	2022 Marmolada serac collapse	Mountaineering disaster	Marmolada, Trentino, Trentino-Alto Adige (Trentino-Alto Adige/Südtirol)	
11	1996	Secondigliano tragedy	Gas explosion	Naples, Metropolitan City of Naples, Campania	
11	1960	Itavia Flight 115	Plane crash	Elba, province of Livorno, Tuscany	
11	1882	Verona flood of 1882	Flood	Province of Verona, Veneto	
11	1997	1997 Umbria and Marche earthquakes	Earthquake	Umbria and Marche	
11	1983	Champoluc-Crest cable car accident	Cable car accident	Aosta Valley	
11	1916	Pedaso train accident	Train accident	Pedaso, Province of Fermo, Marche	
10	1985	Coronella train accident	Train collision	Poggio Renatico, Province of Ferrara, Emilia-Romagna	
10	1962	Sinking of the Potho	Shipwreck	Monte Conero, province of Ancona, Marche	
10	1931	1931 Palermo flood	Flood	Metropolitan City of Palermo, Sicily	

== Gallery ==
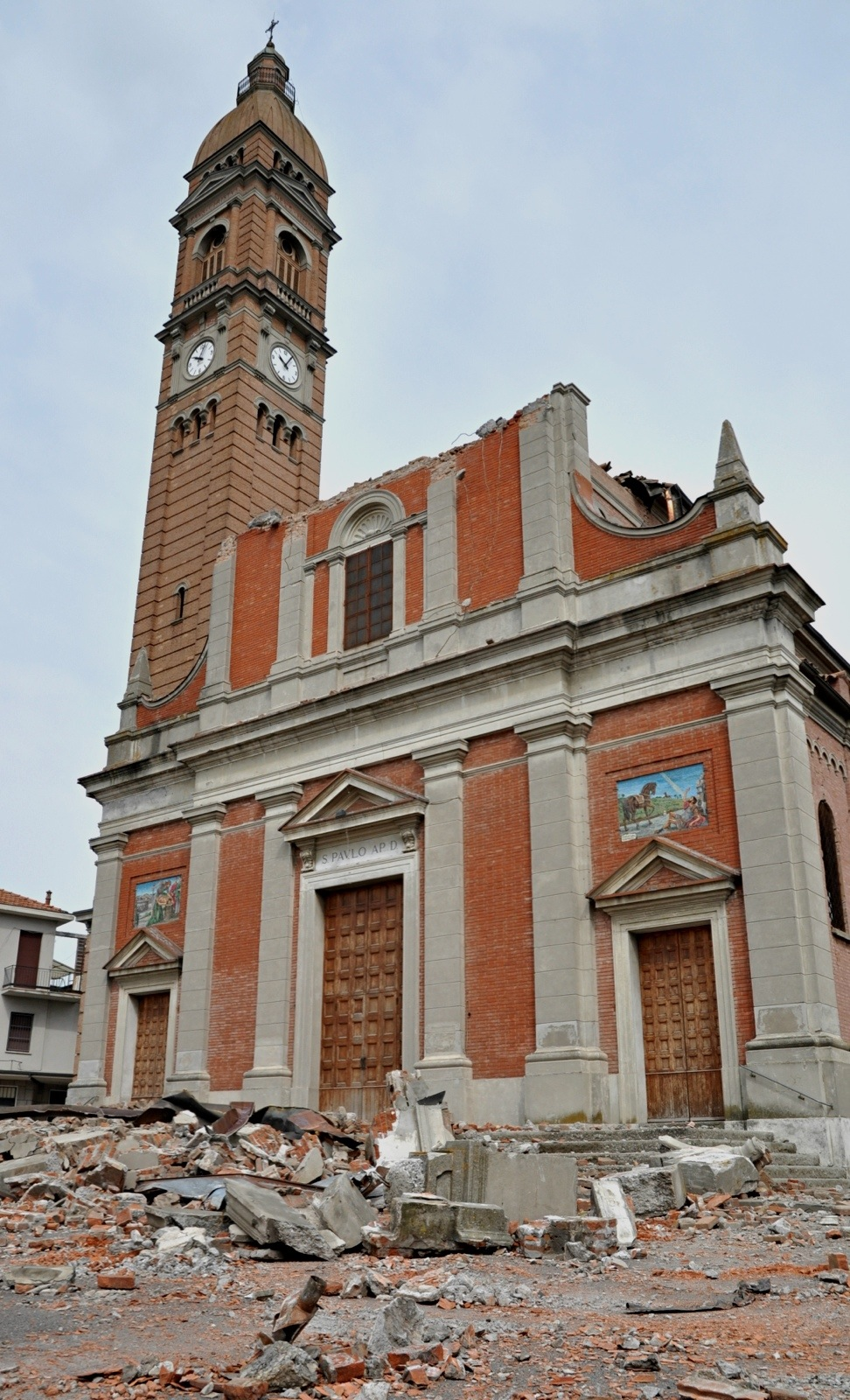
2012 Northern Italy earthquakes

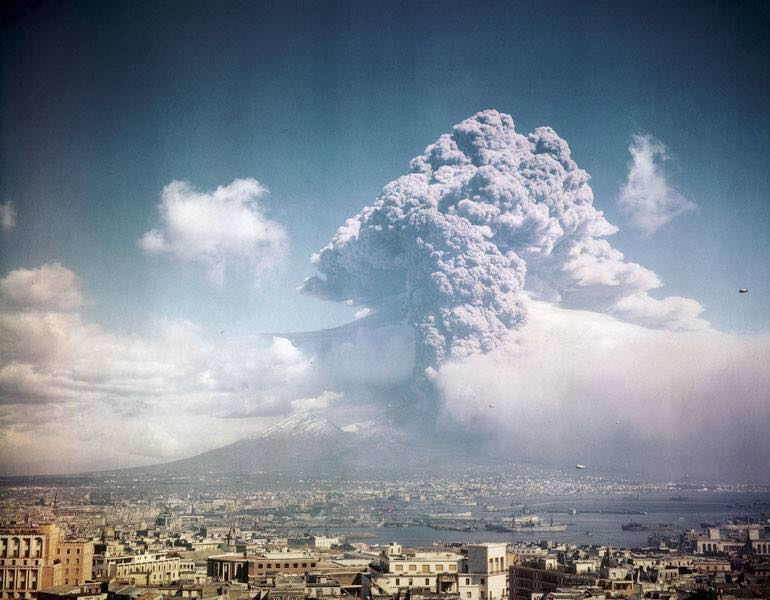
1944 Mount Vesuvius eruption

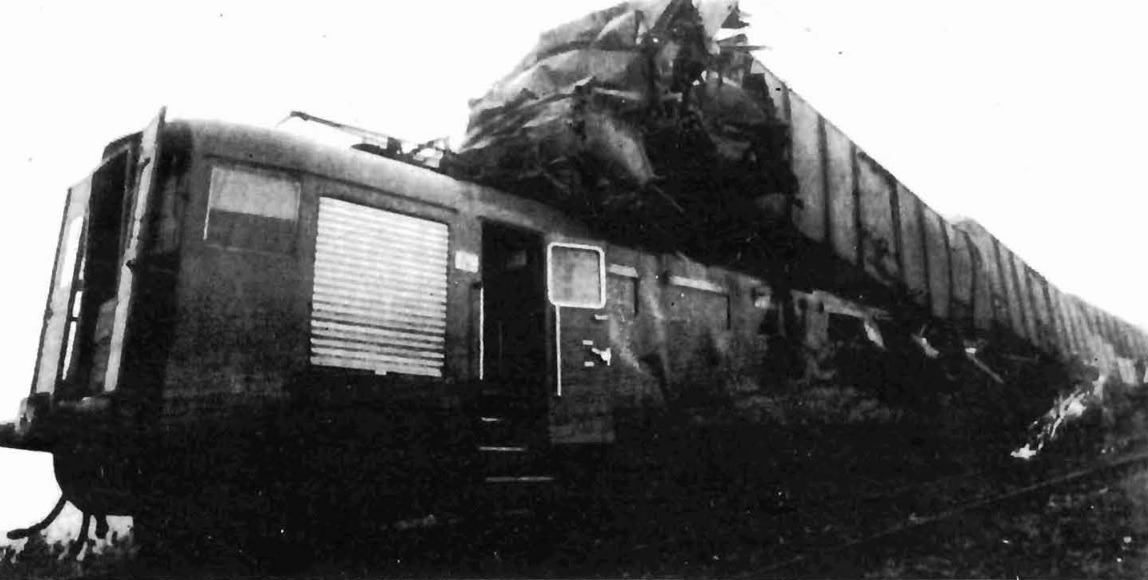
Coronella train accident

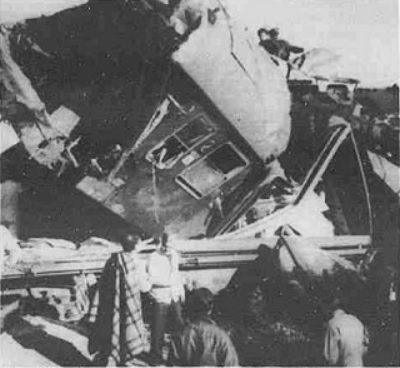
Curinga train disaster

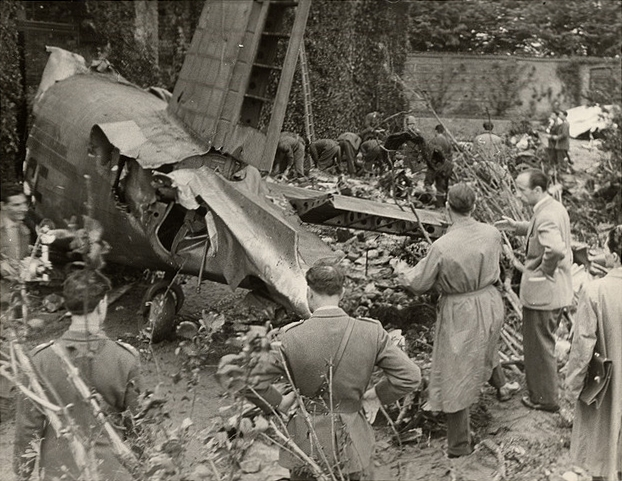
Superga air disaster

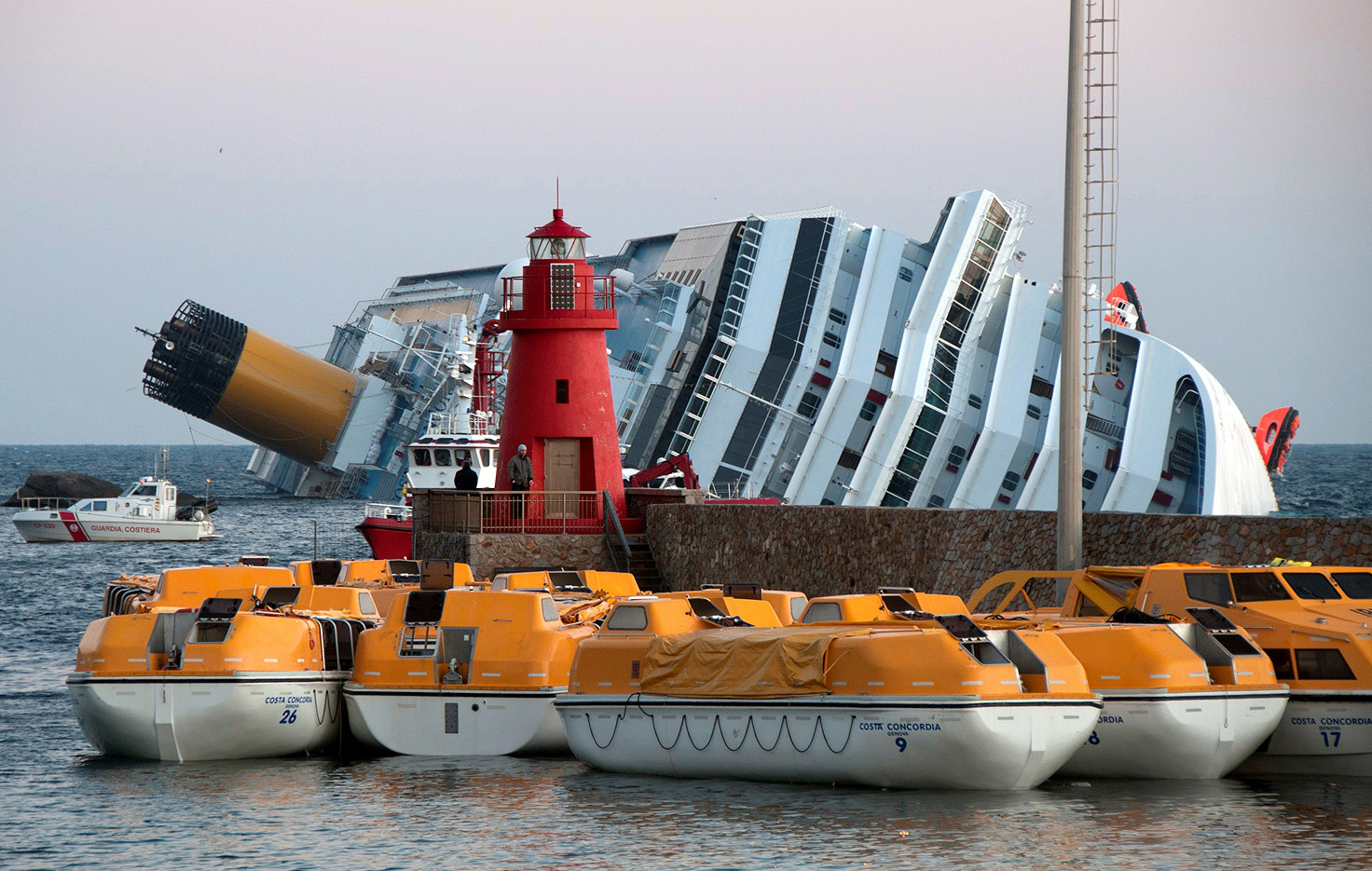
Sinking of the Costa Concordia

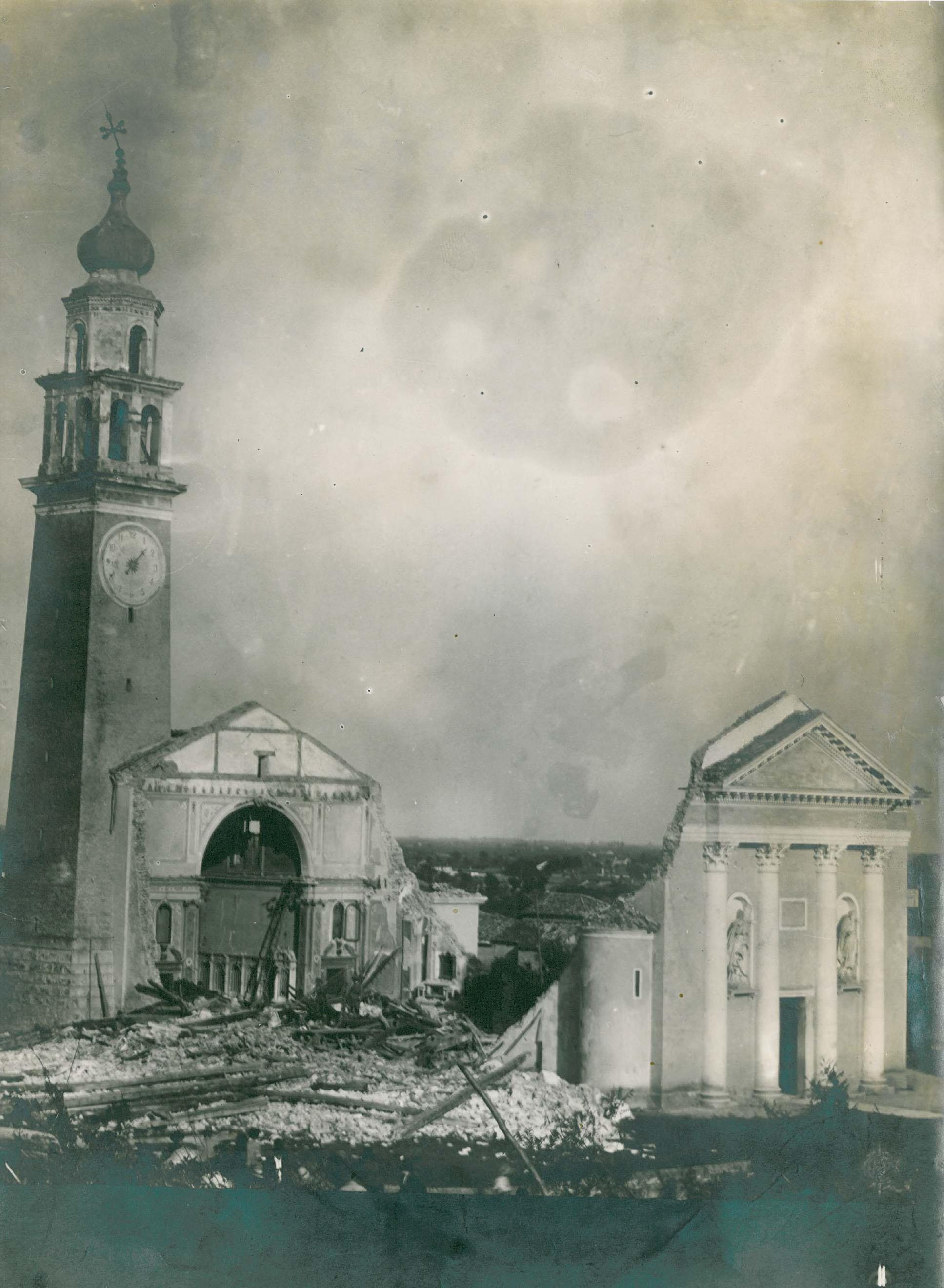
1930 Montello Tornado

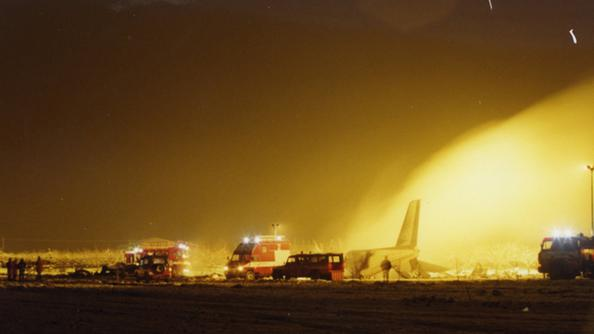
Banat Air Flight 166

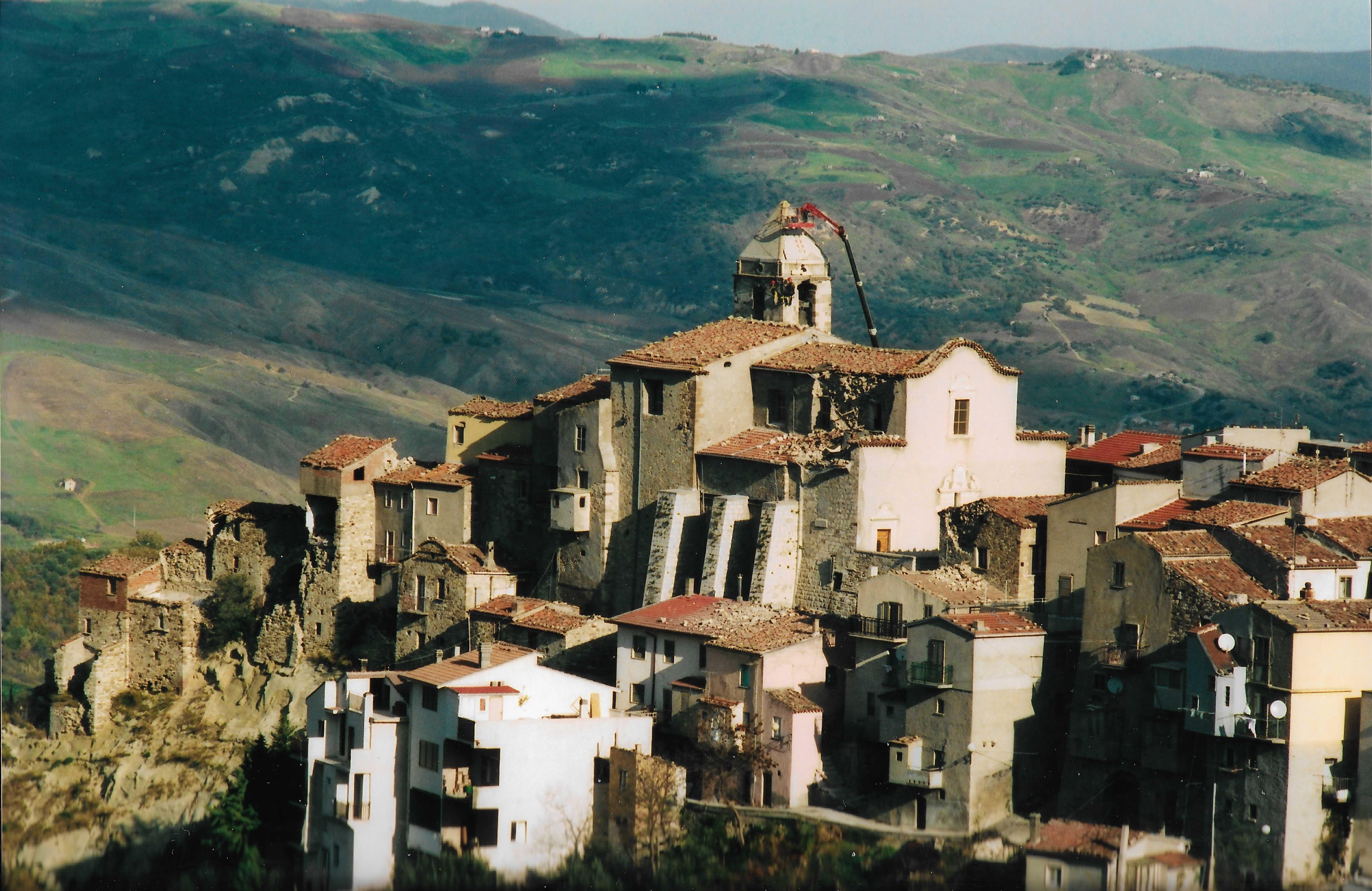
2002 Molise earthquakes

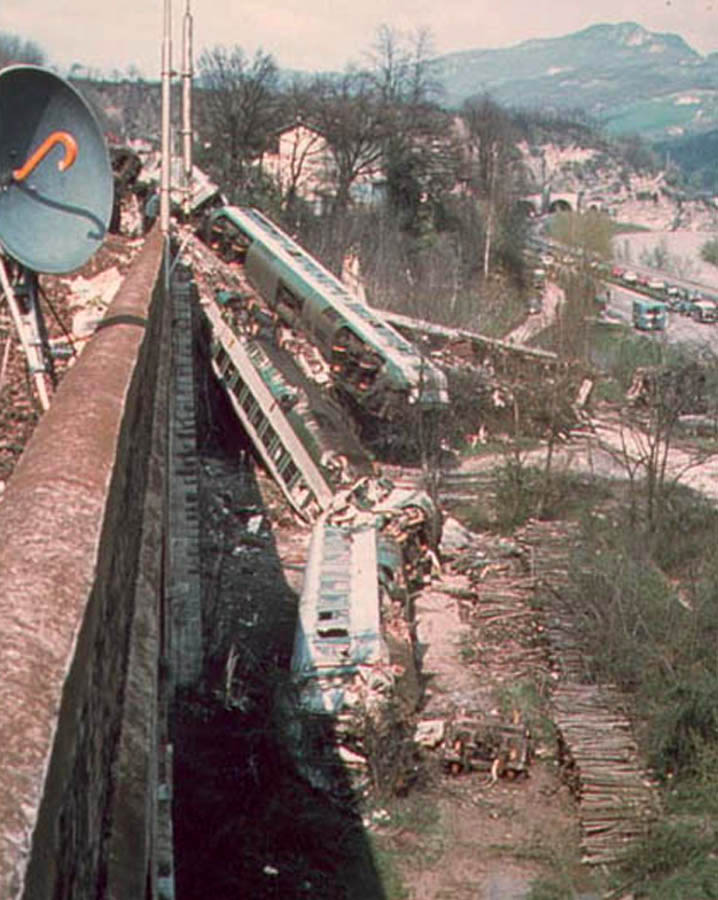
Murazze di Vado train disaster

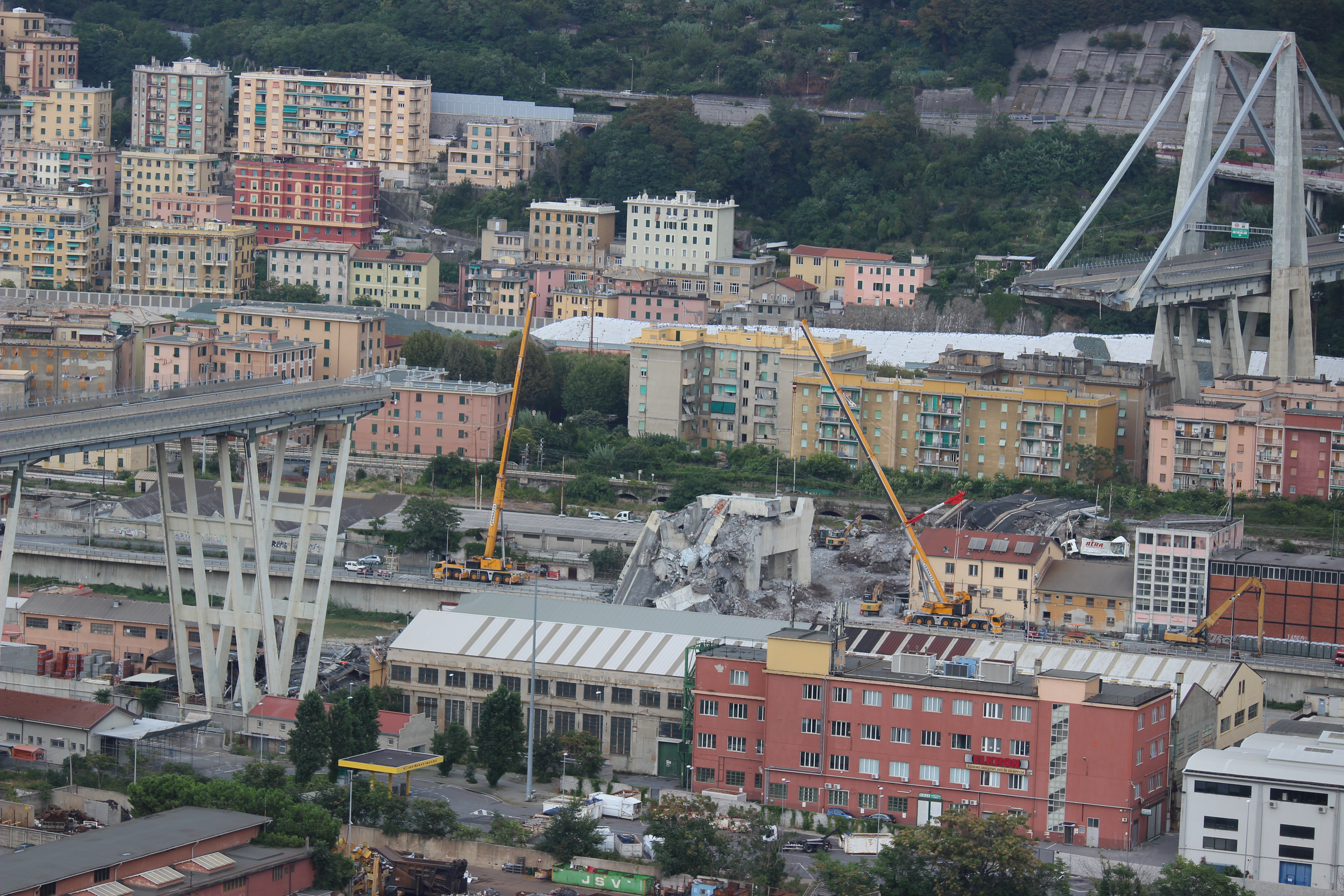
Ponte Morandi collapse

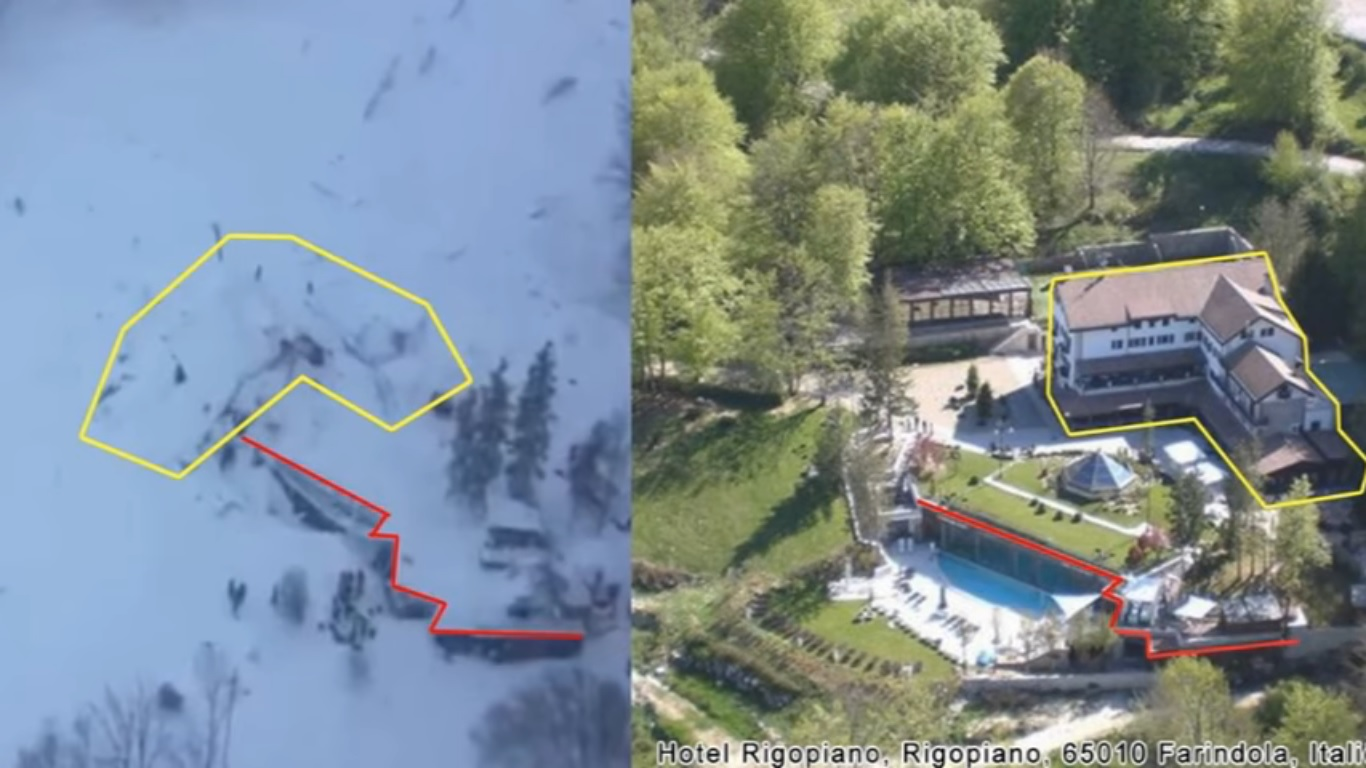
Rigopiano avalanche

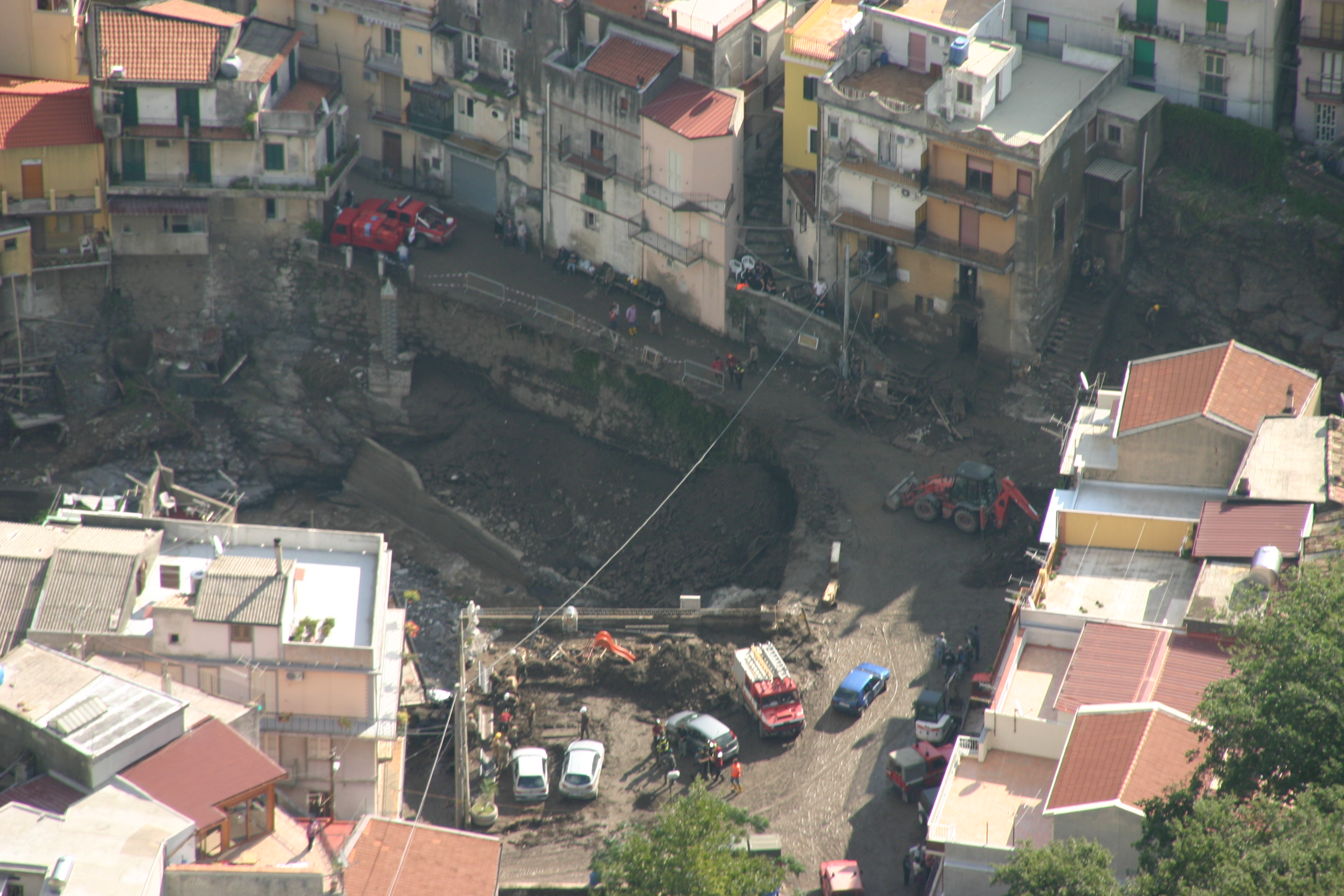
2009 Messina floods and mudslides

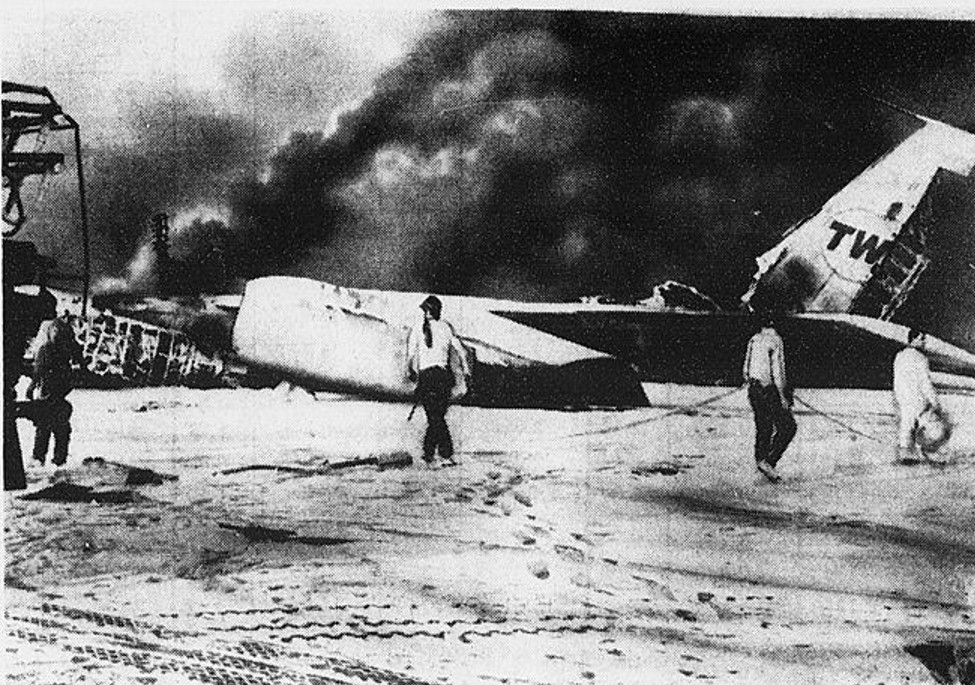
TWA Flight 800

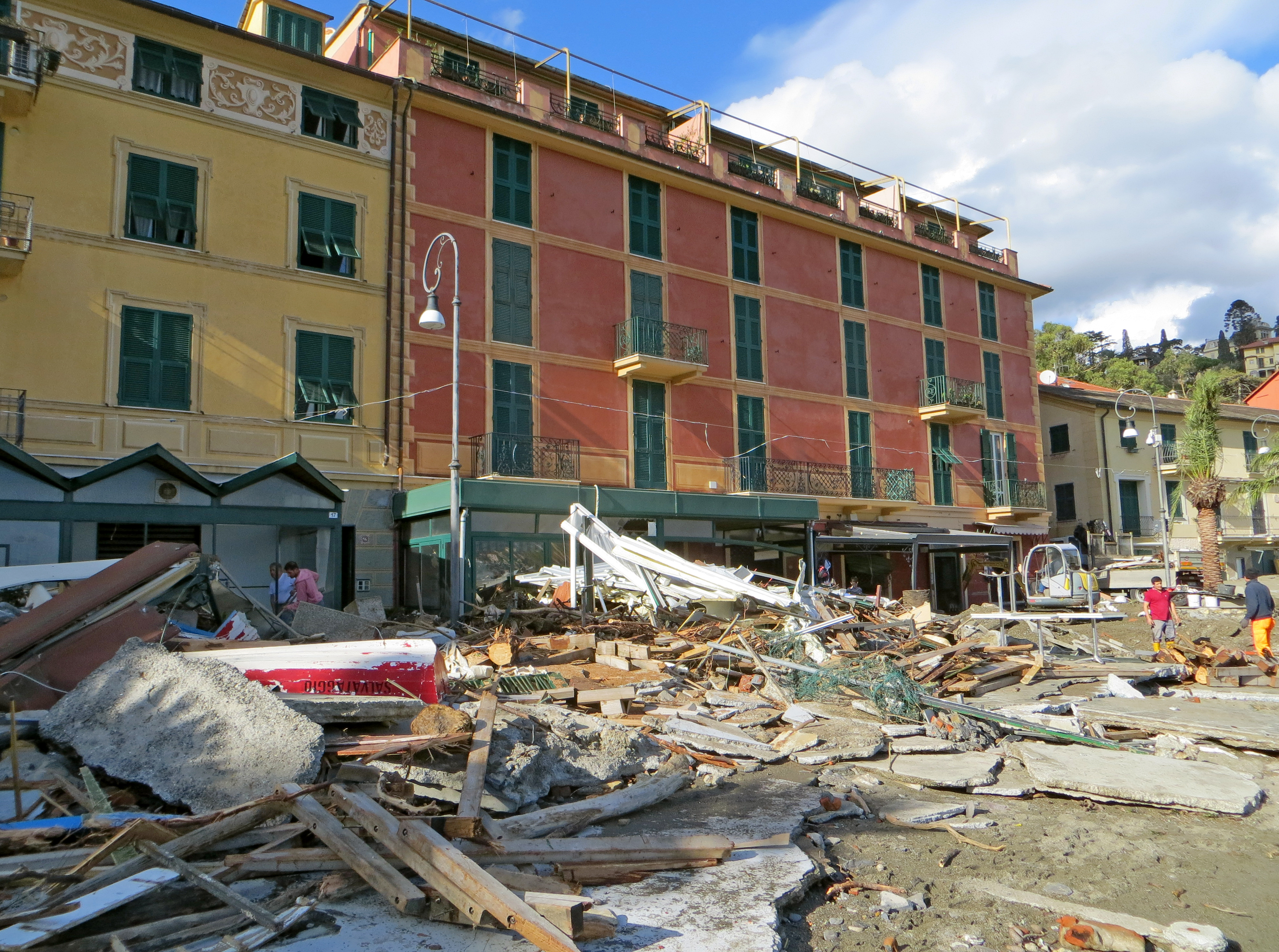
Storm Adrian

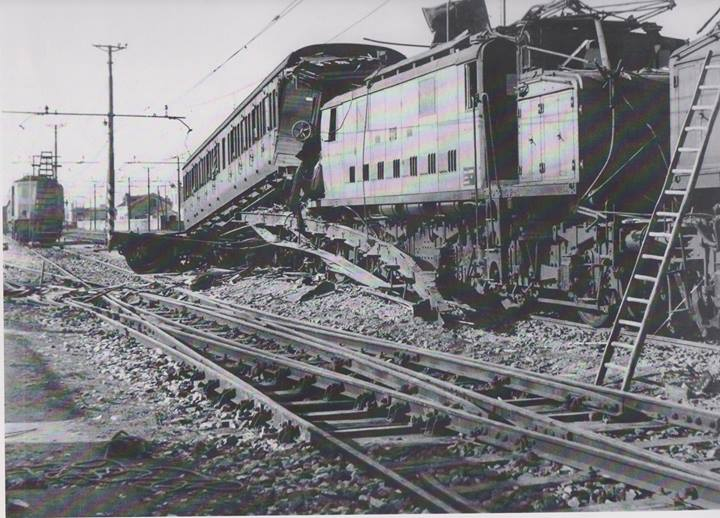
Nocera Inferiore train accident

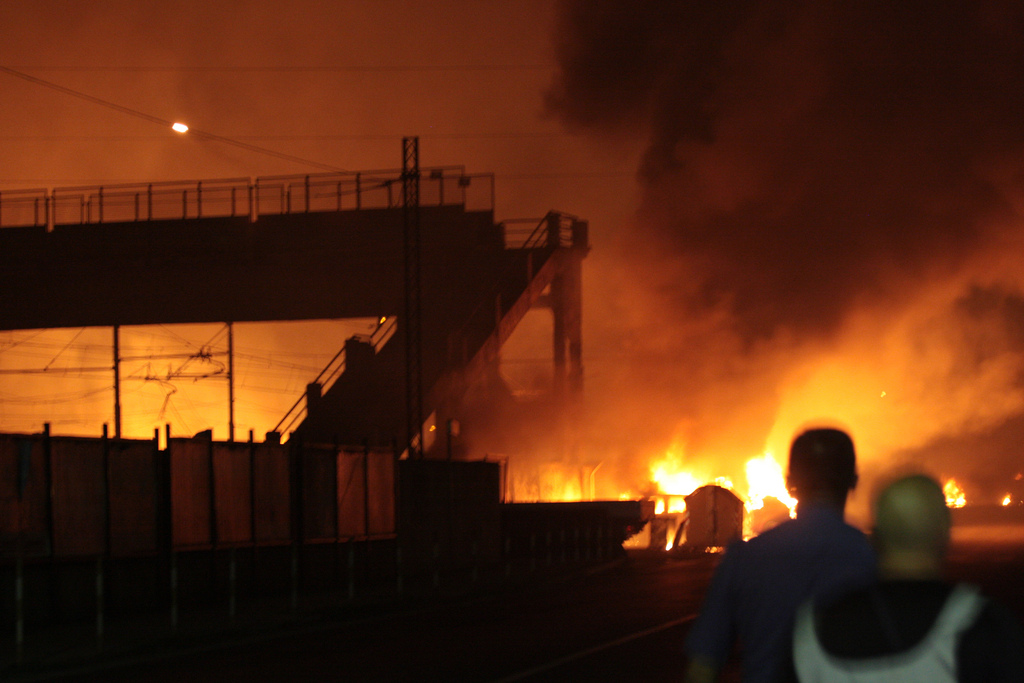
Viareggio train derailment

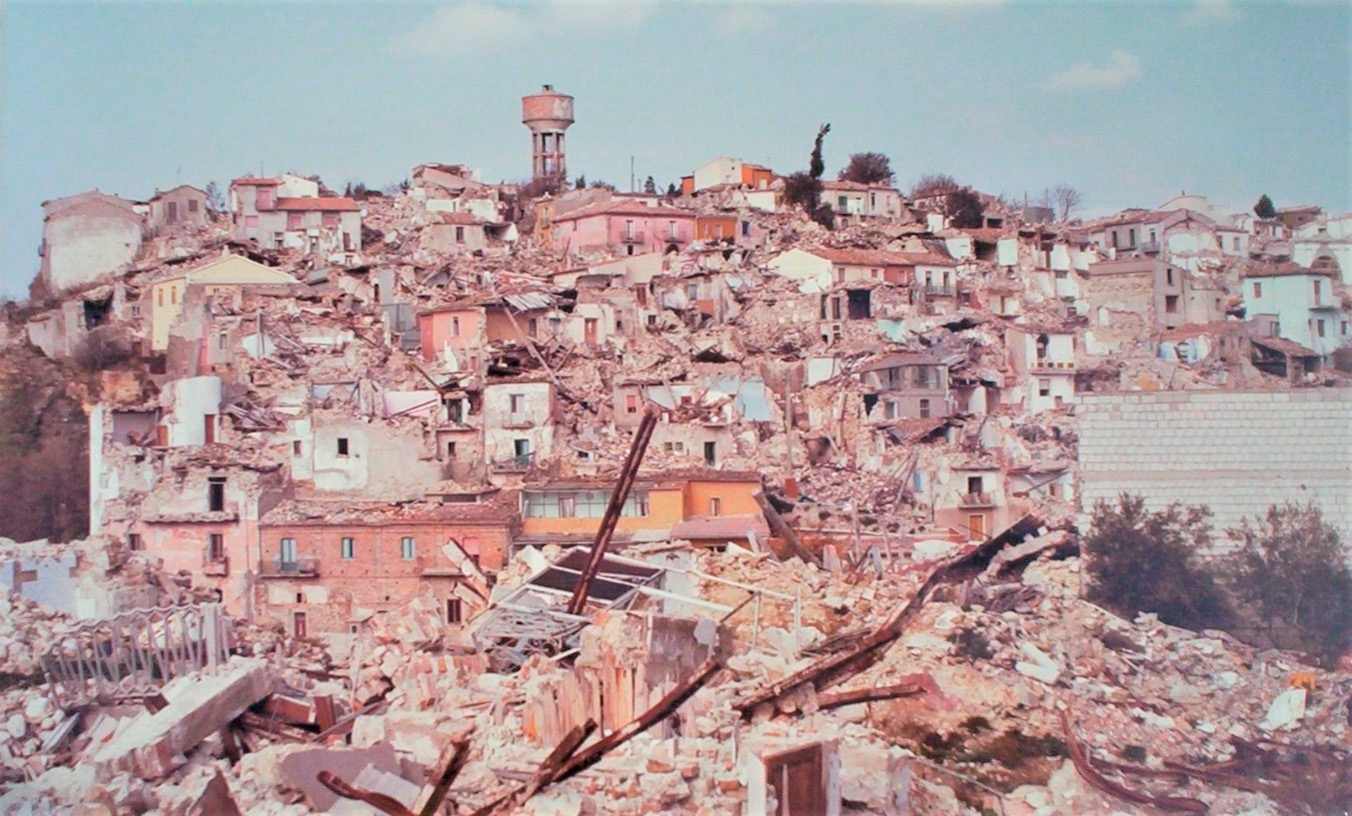
1980 Irpinia earthquake

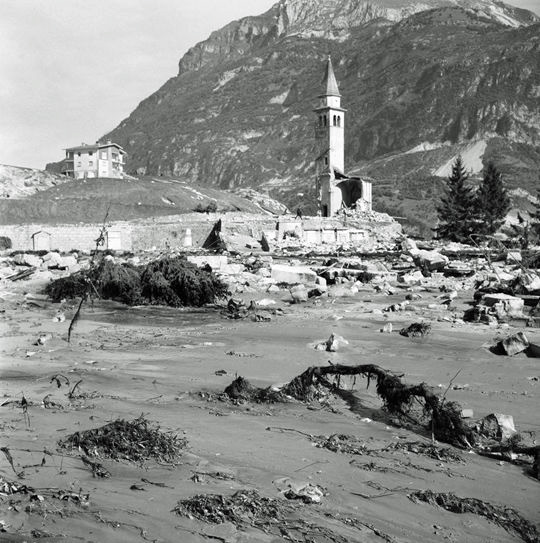
Vajont Dam disaster

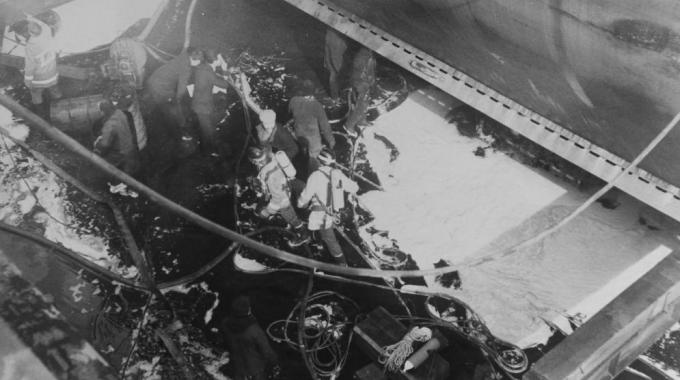
Elisabetta Montanari disaster

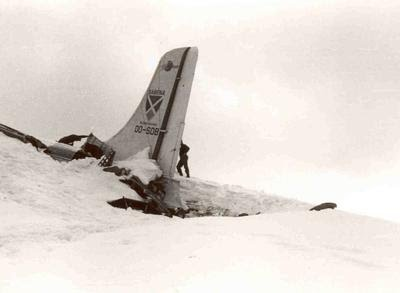
Sabena Flight 503

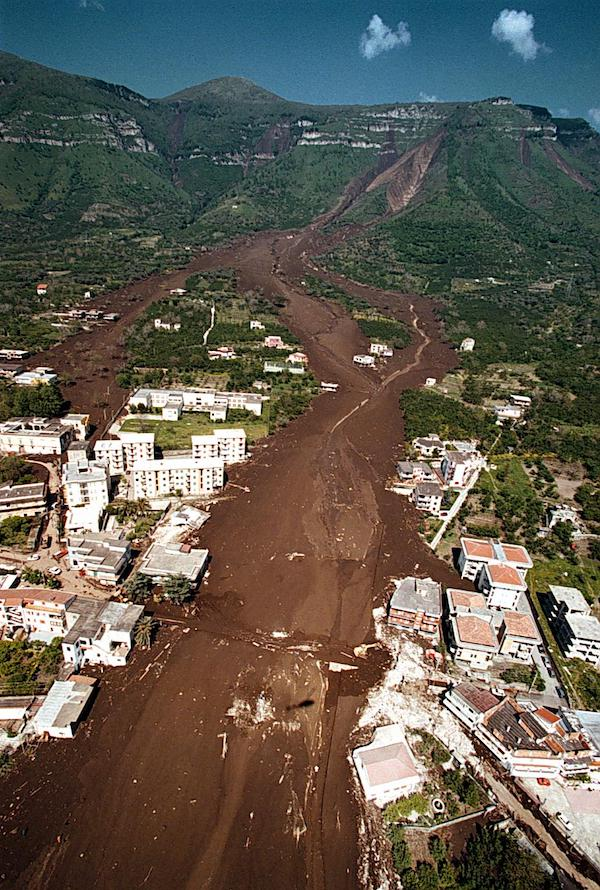
Sarno landslide

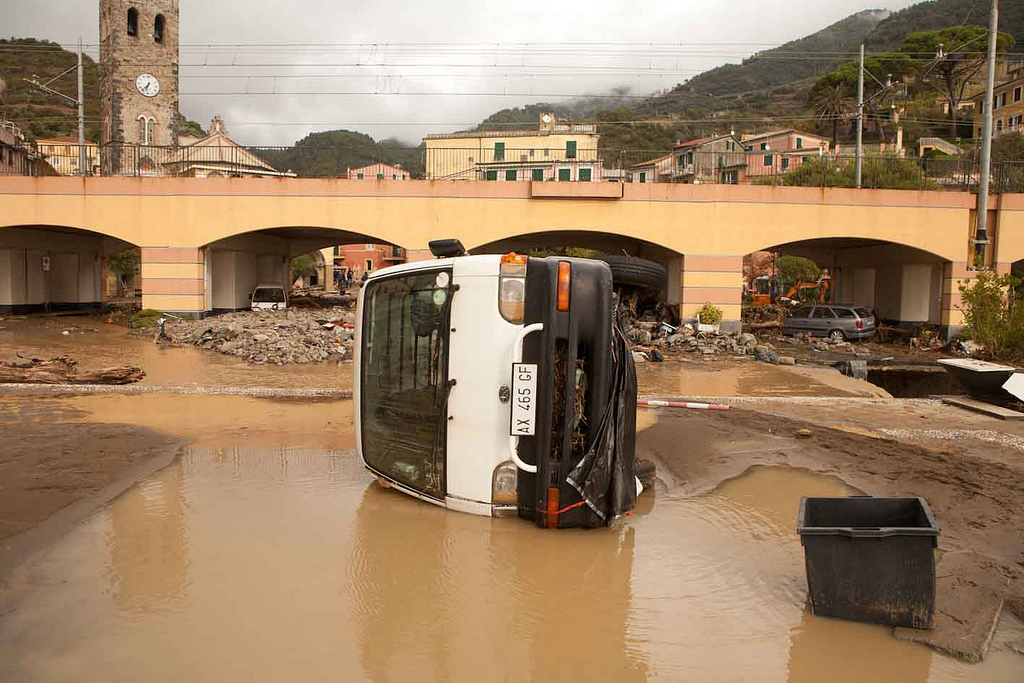
2011 Vara and Magra Valley floods

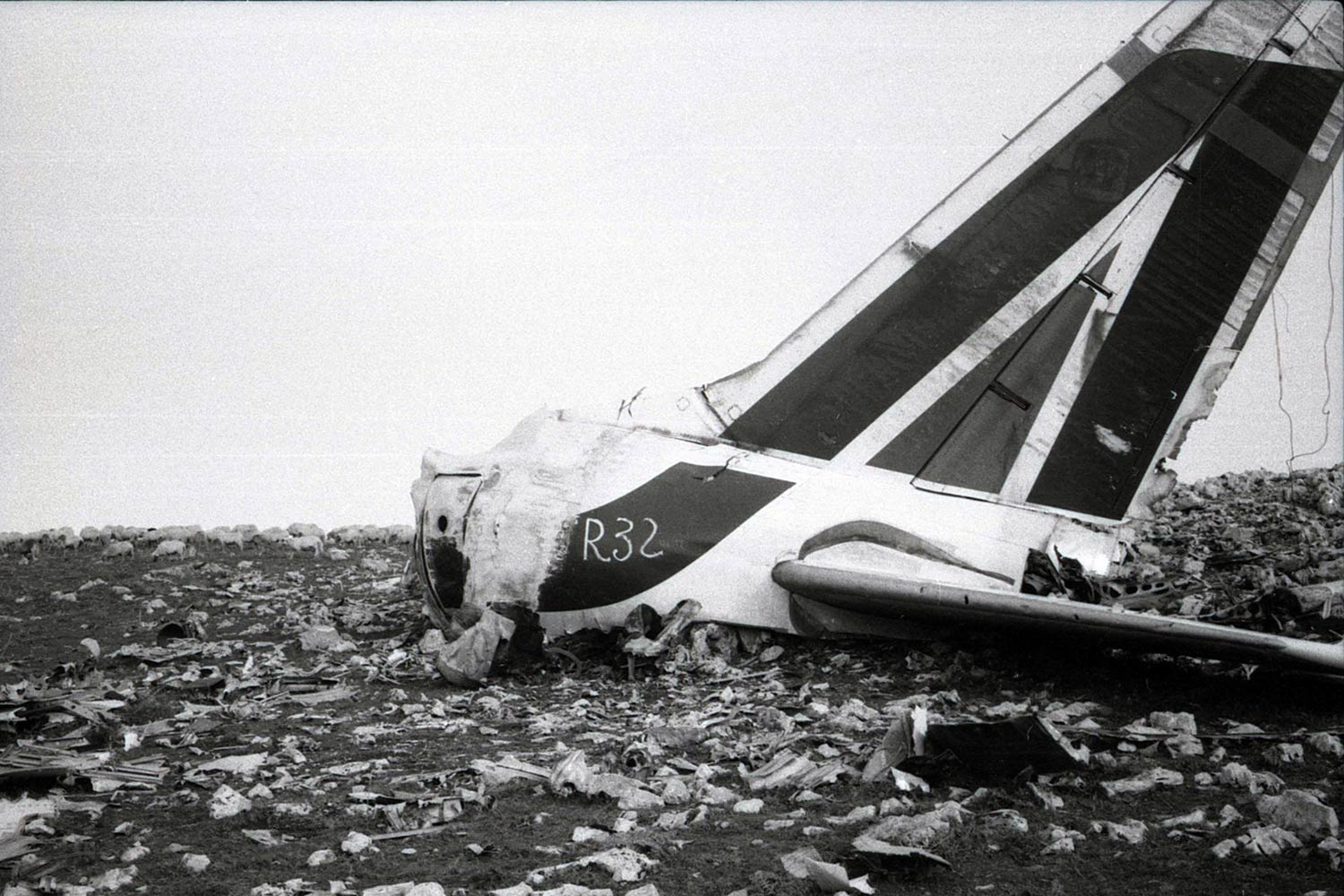
Alitalia Flight 112

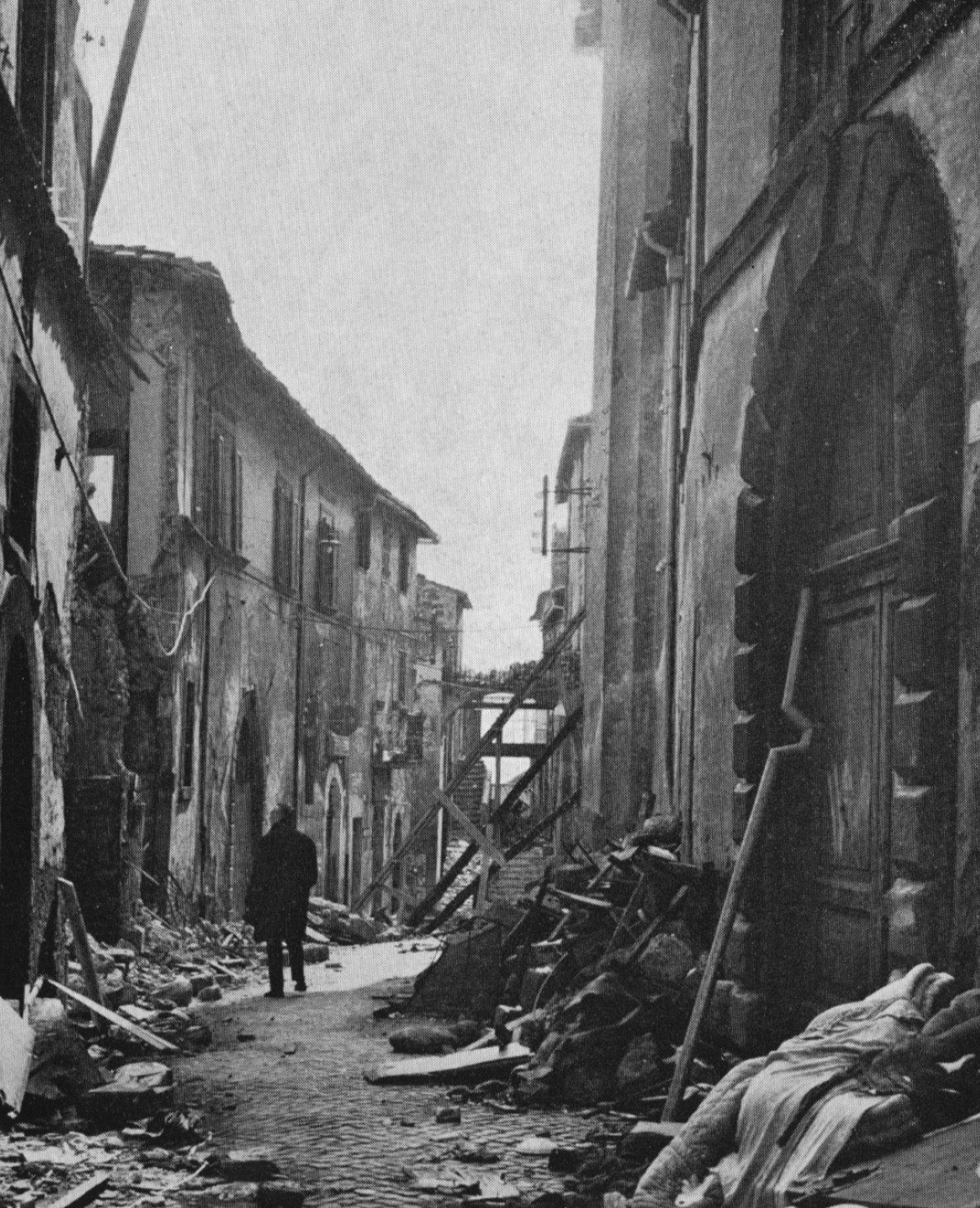
1971 Tuscania earthquake

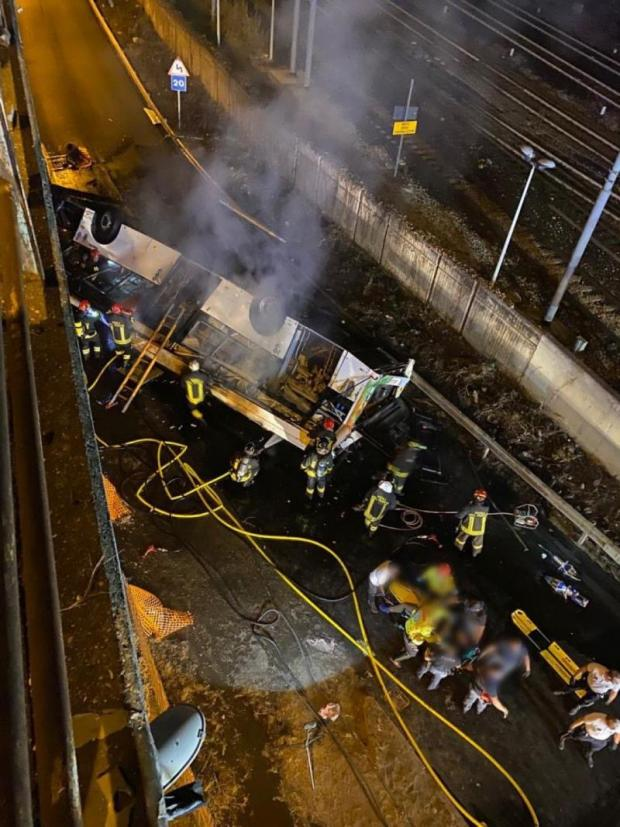
2023 Venice bus crash

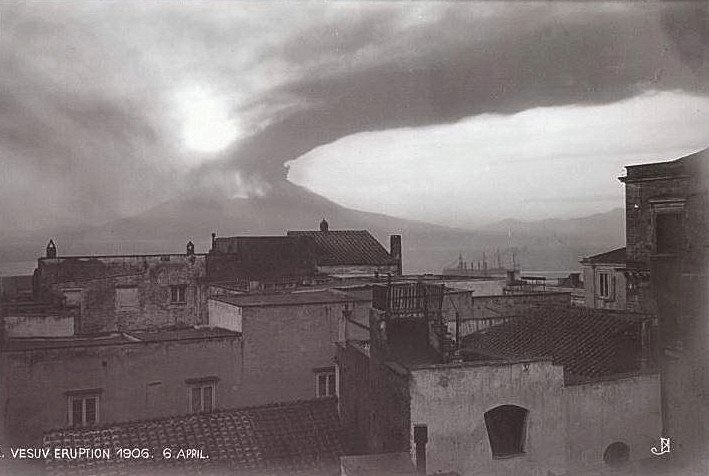
1906 eruption of Mount Vesuvius

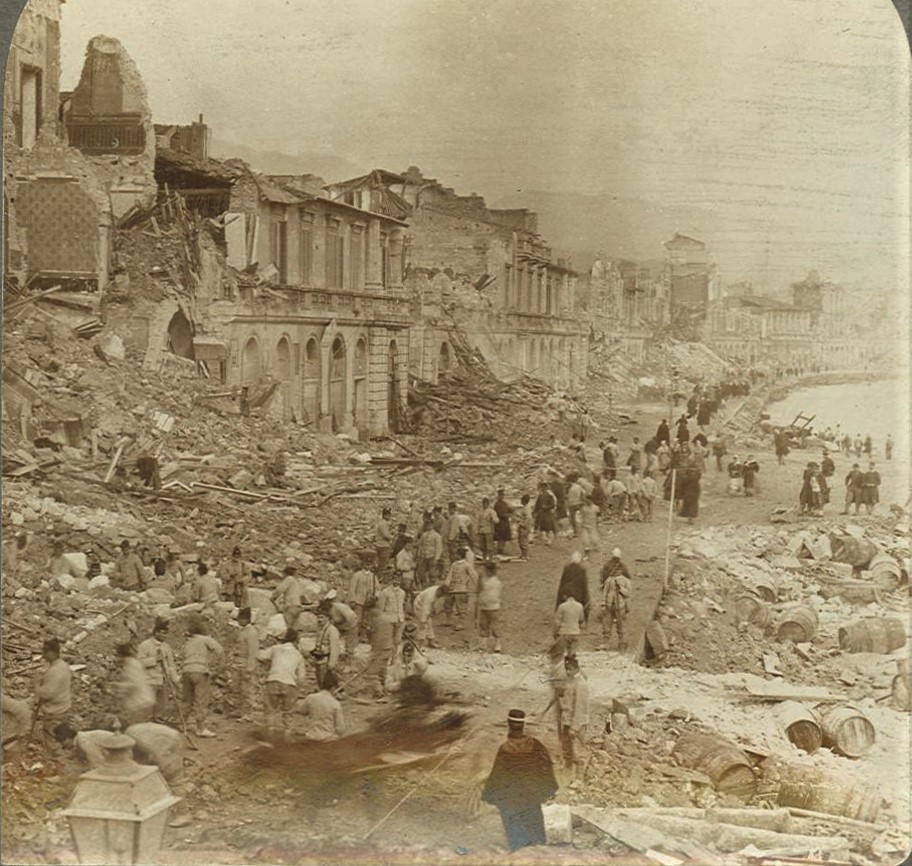
1908 Messina earthquake

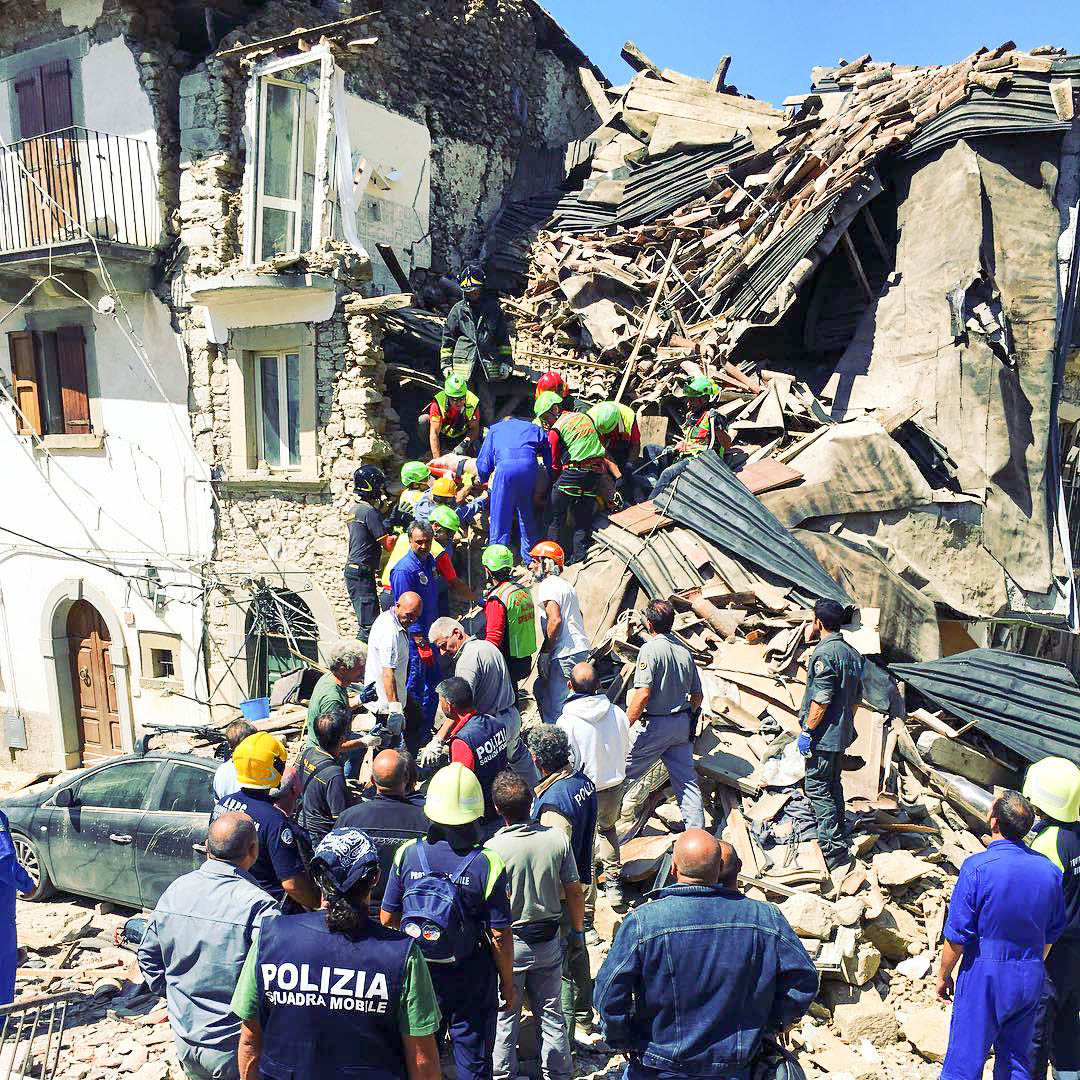
August 2016 Central Italy earthquake

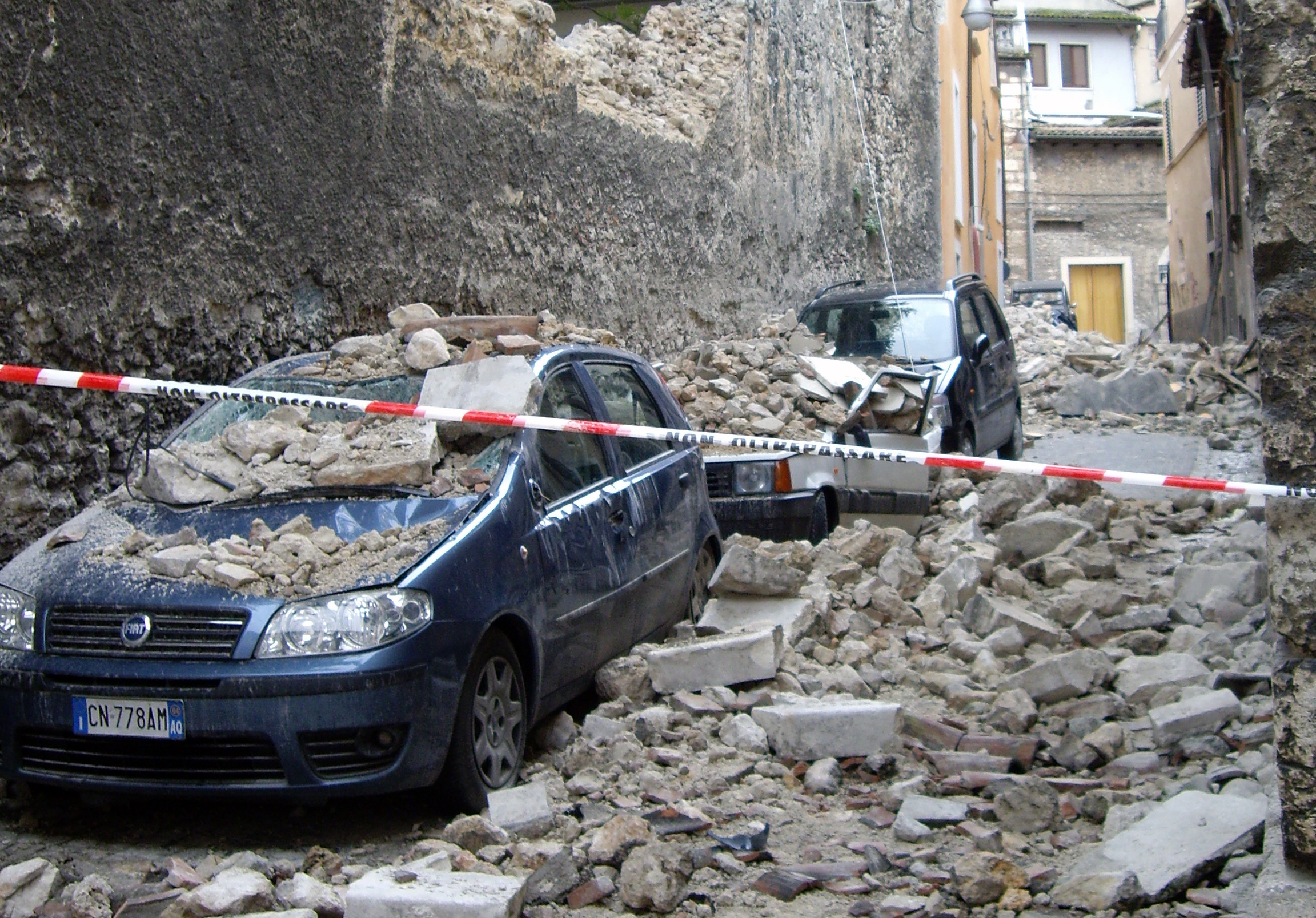
2009 L'Aquila earthquake

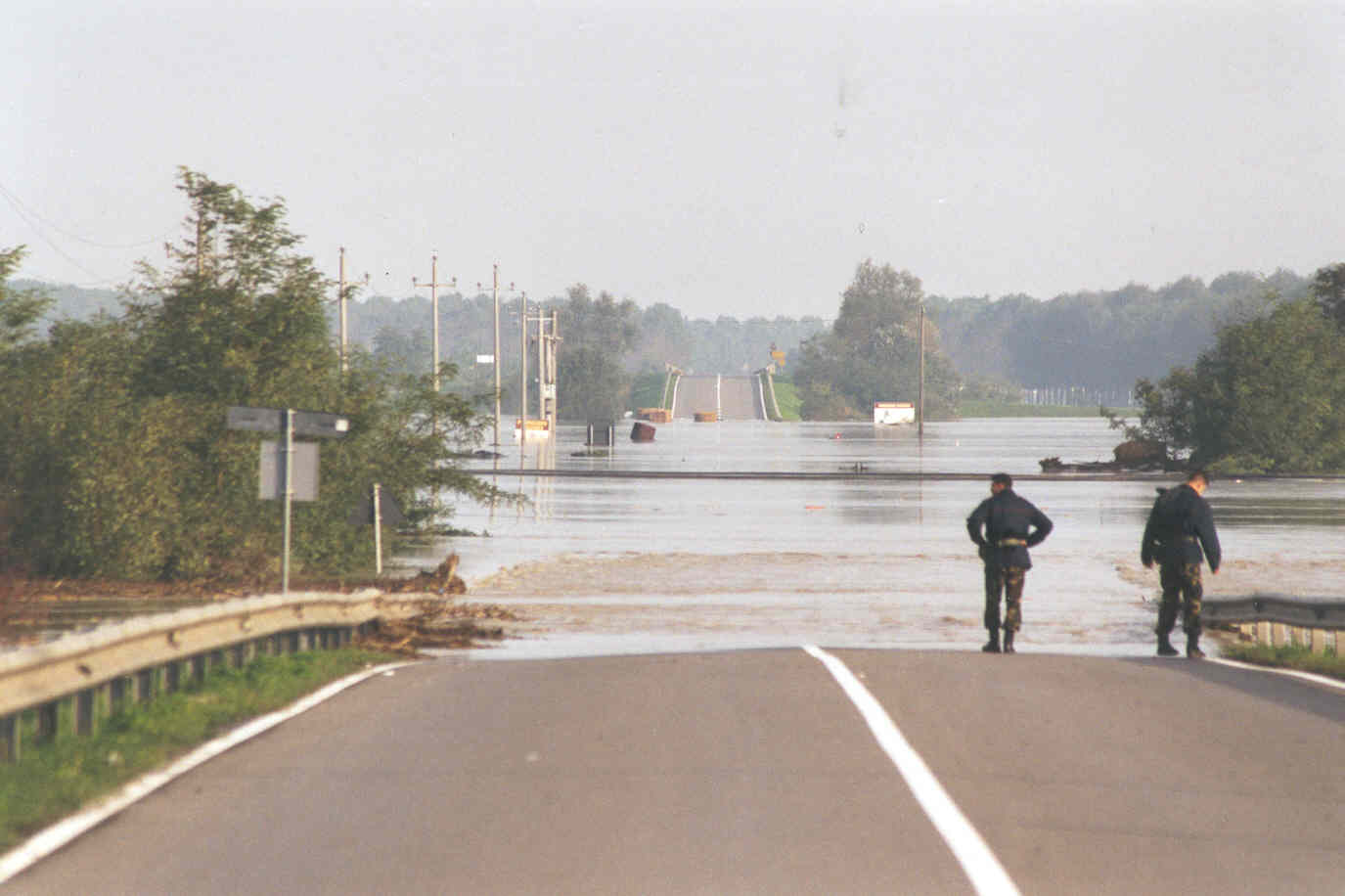
2000 Piedmont flood

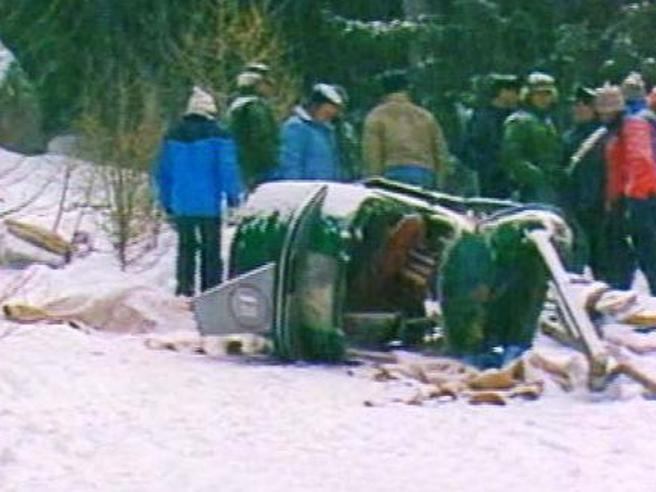
Champoluc-Crest cable car accident

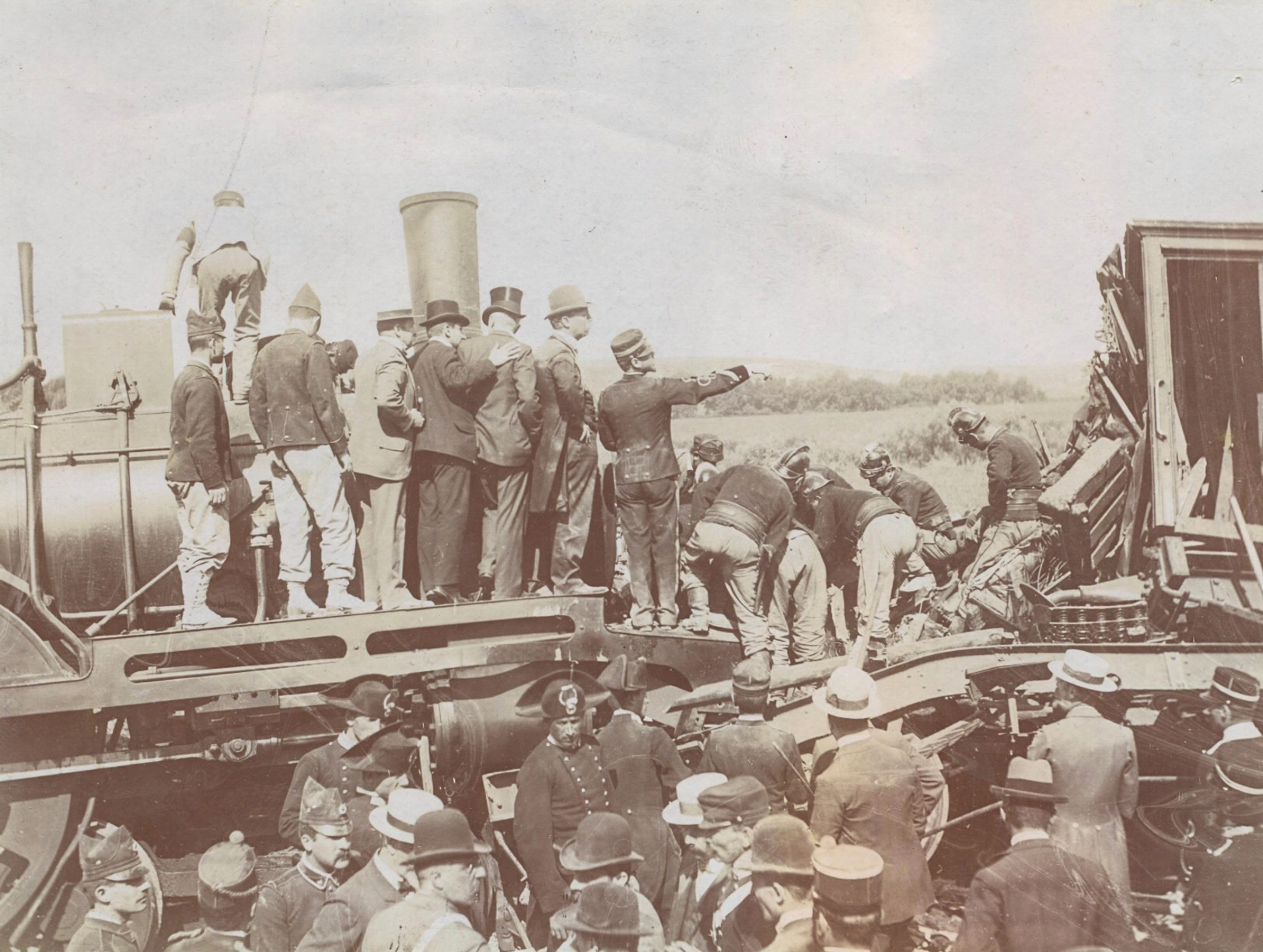
Castel Giubileo train disaster

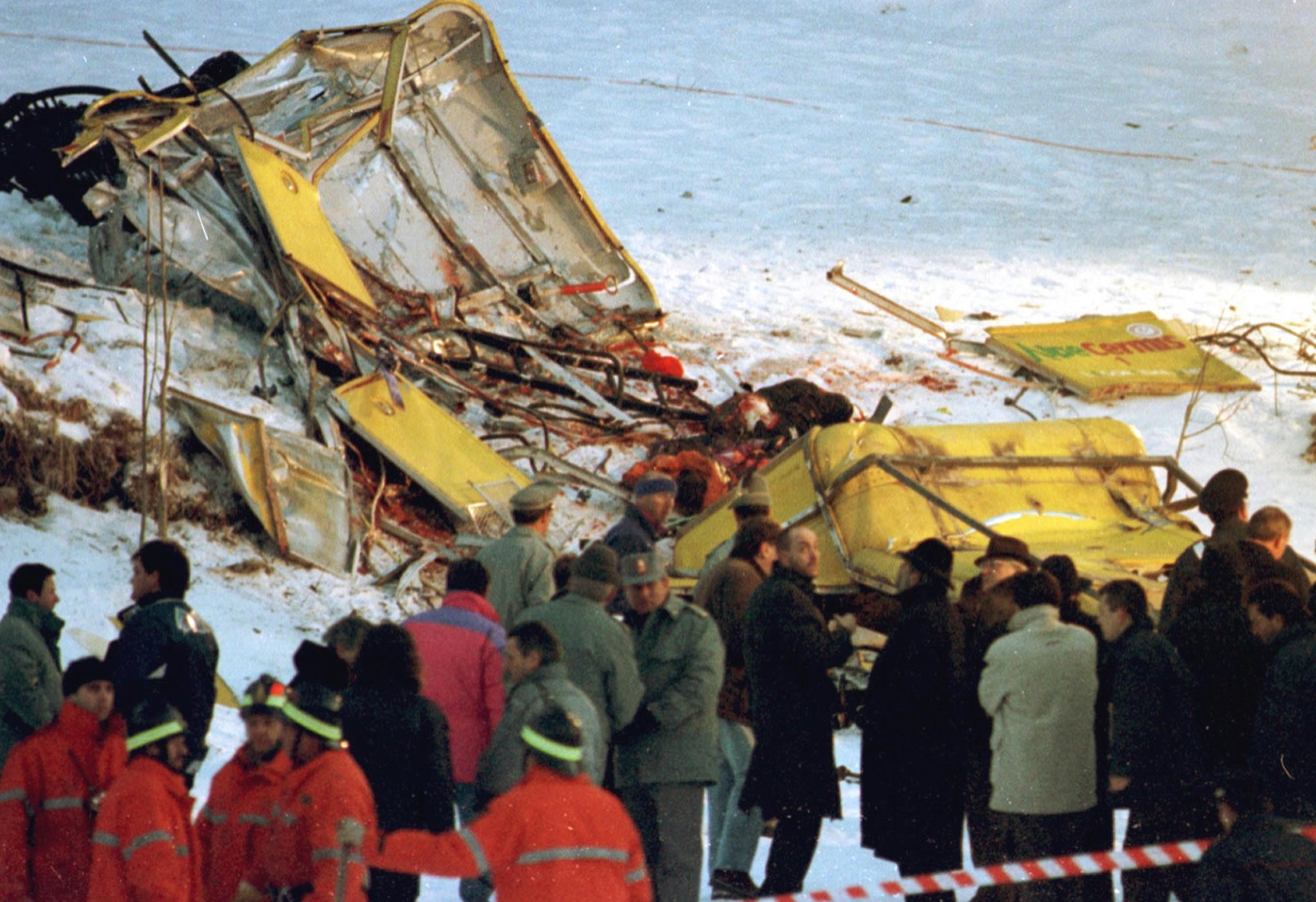
1998 Cavalese cable car crash

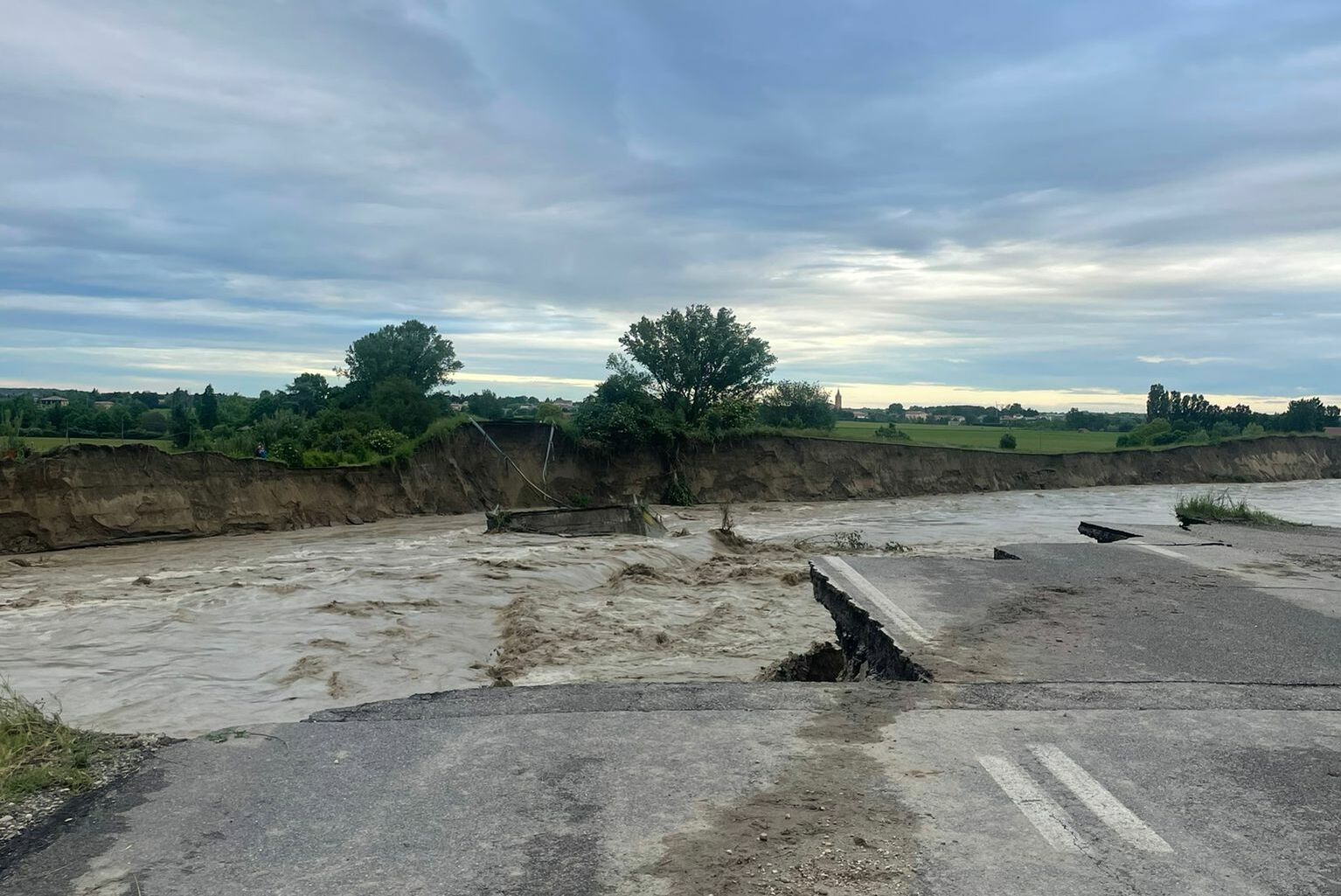
2023 Emilia-Romagna floods

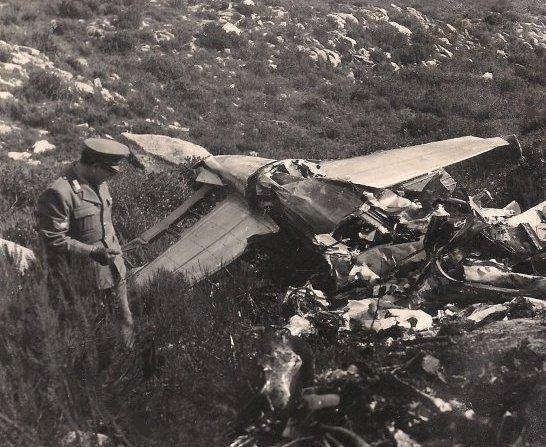
Itavia Flight 115

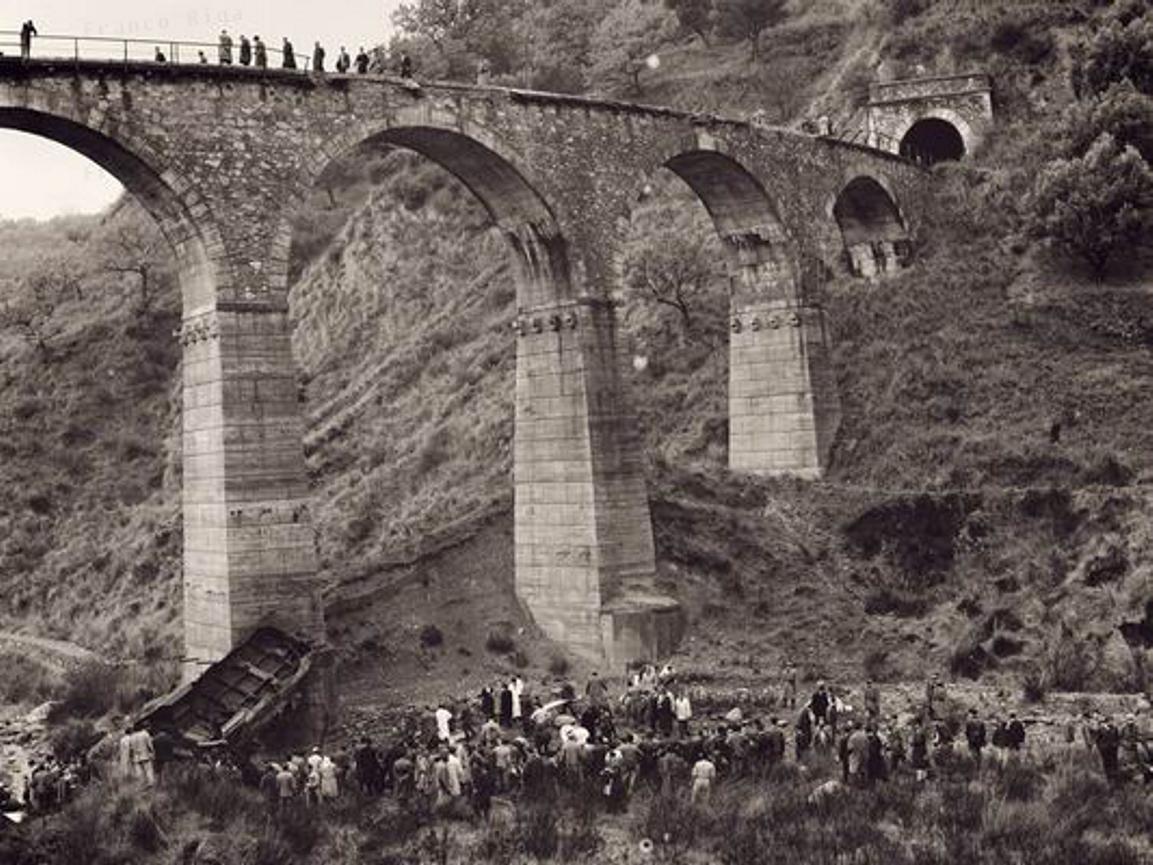
Fiumarella rail disaster

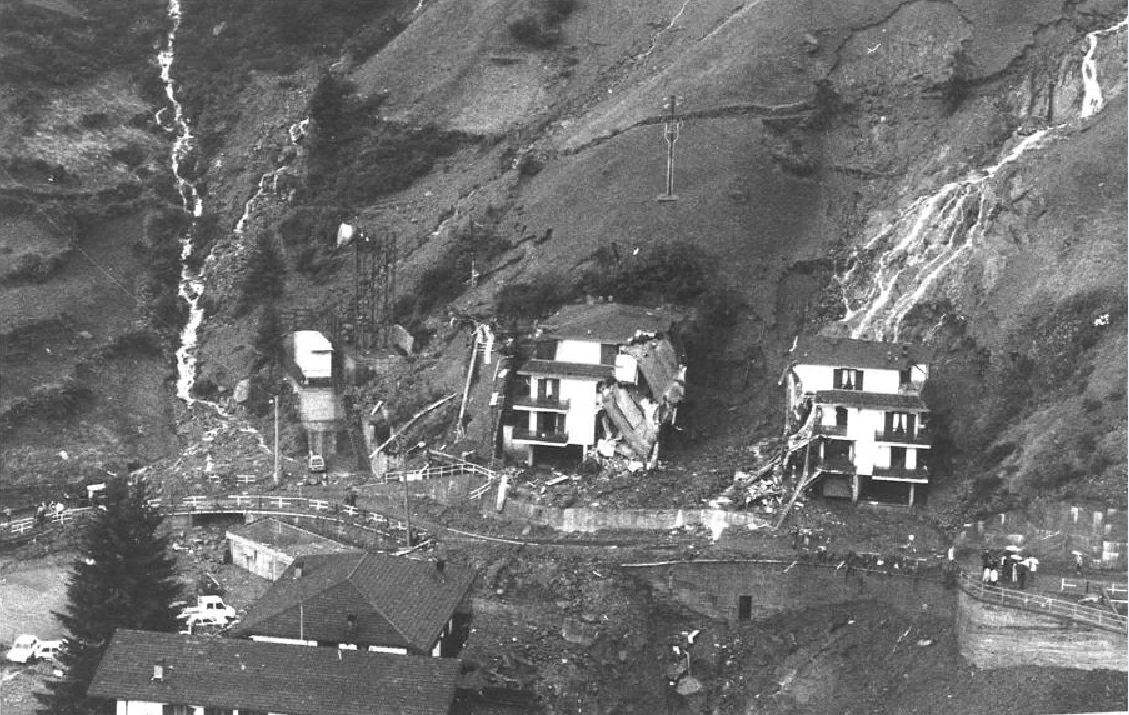
Val Pola landslide

== See also ==
- List of disasters in Spain by death toll
- List of disasters in Croatia by death toll
- List of disasters in Greece by death toll
- List of disasters in France by death toll
- List of disasters in Switzerland by death toll
