= Alitalia Flight 045 =

1964 aviation accident in Italy

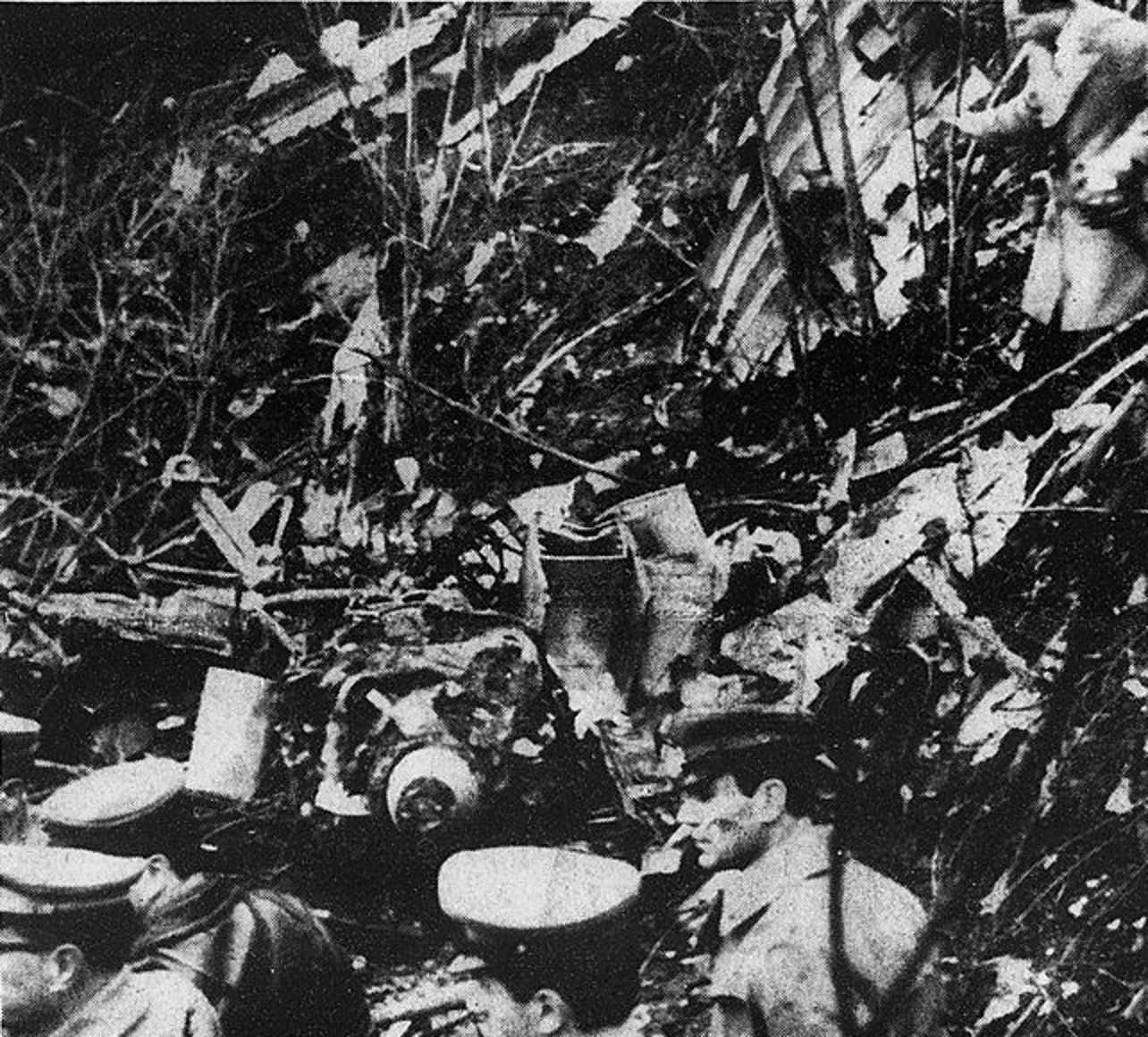
- Wreckage of the aircraft

Accident
- Date: 28 March 1964
- Summary: Controlled flight into terrain
- Site: Mount Somma, Campania, Italy; 40°49′18″N 14°25′34″E

Aircraft
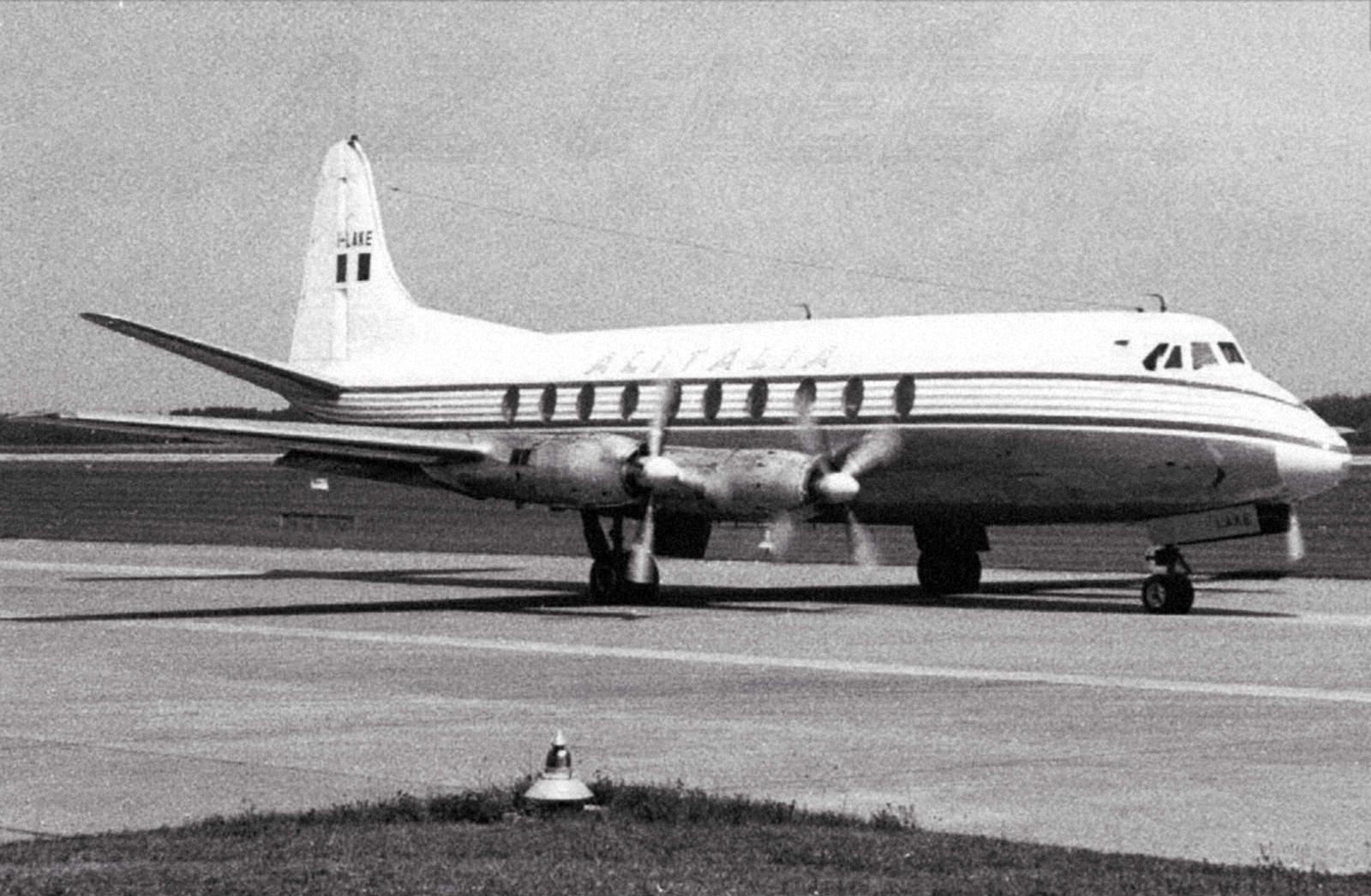
- I-LAKE, the aircraft involved in the accident
- Aircraft type: Vickers Viscount 785D
- Operator: Alitalia
- IATA flight No.: AZ045
- ICAO flight No.: AZA045
- Call sign: ALITALIA 045
- Registration: I-LAKE
- Flight origin: Turin-Caselle Airport, Turin, Italy
- Last stopover: Rome Fiumicino Airport, Rome, Italy
- Destination: Naples International Airport, Naples, Italy
- Occupants: 45
- Passengers: 40
- Crew: 5
- Fatalities: 45
- Survivors: 0

Alitalia Flight 045 was a scheduled flight operated by Alitalia with a Vickers Viscount 785D from Turin to Naples with a stopover in Rome. On 28 March 1964, while landing at Naples International Airport, the aircraft crashed into the slopes of Mount Somma due to poor weather conditions, causing the deaths of all 40 passengers and 5 crew members on board.

== Aircraft ==
The aircraft involved in the accident was a Vickers Viscount 785D with the registration number I-LAKE, powered by four Rolls Royce Dart 510s. It made its first flight on 18 August 1957 and was delivered to Alitalia on 1 October of the same year. It was the first Viscount to operate for the airline.

== Flight ==
The flight left Turin-Caselle Airport at 7:15 PM bound for Rome with 49 passengers, landing at Rome Fiumicino at 8:20 PM. In Fiumicino all passengers disembarked, and 4 passengers from Turin along with 36 from Rome boarded the Vickers Viscount bound for Naples.

Due to bad weather and a technical problem which led to the replacement of the turbine oil temperature indicator of Engine No. 1, the take-off which was scheduled for 9:25 PM was delayed until 10:10 PM. The departure used Runway 25 with authorization from the Rome ACC.

At 10:11 PM the pilot, instructed by Fiumicino Tower, had established regular contact with the Rome ACC on frequency 123.7.

At 10:28 PM the pilot had made contact with Naples ATC on frequency 120.7 and asked for the weather report which was as follows:

"6/8 coverage - 2/8 CU at 2000 ft. - 3/8 SC at 3000 ft. - 2/8 AC at 7000 ft. - visibility 6 Km - QNH 29.65 - Runway in use 24 - QFE 29.31 - wind from the south 180/210 12 knots with runway 24 - temperature 11°"

Explanation:

"6/8 cloud coverage - 2/8 Cumulus at 2,000 ft (610 m) - 3/8 Stratocumulus at 3,000 ft (910 m) - 2/8 Altocumulus at 7,000 ft (2,100 m) - visibility 6 km (3.7 mi) - QNH 29.65 inHg (barometric pressure at sea level) - runway in use 24 - QFE 29.31 inHg (barometric pressure at airfield elevation) - wind from south (direction 180 to 210 degrees) at 12 knots aligned with runway 24 - temperature 11° celsius"

Original excerpt:

"6/8 copertura - 2/8 CU a 2000 ft. - 3/8 SC a 3000 ft. - 2/8 AC a 7000 ft. - visibilità 6 Km - QNH 29.65 - Pista in uso 24 - QFE 29.31 - vento da Sud 180/210 12 nodi con pista 24 - temperatura 11°"

At 10:32 PM the aircraft was cleared to descend from 7,000 ft (2,100 m) to 5,000 ft (1,500 m) and then at 10:34 PM to 4,000 ft (1,200 m) and was asked if it intended to use ILS. The aircraft replied: "we don't think so because we can see it" ("non crediamo perché si vede"). At 10:35 PM the aircraft reported directly above a beacon (beacon LD). Naples ATC asked what type of approach it intended to make and received the following response: "let's see, now we're turning downwind, leaving 4,000 feet directly on visual" ("vediamo, adesso viriamo sottovento lasciando 4000 direttamente on visual").

At 10:36 PM Naples ATC replied: "received... have the runway in sight from LD cleared for visual. Report downwind and on final; wind 180/210° 12 knots" ("ricevuto...avendo la pista in vista da LD autorizzato al visual. Riportate sottovento e in finale vento da 180/210° 12 nodi"). At 10:37 PM the aircraft communicated that it was leaving the vertical alignment of the LD radio beacon. This was the last radio communication from the aircraft crew with which the pilot Pasquale Umana confirmed the choice of a visual approach flight rather than using the ILS.

Shortly after 10:37 PM Flight 45 flew past Naples, heading towards the sea on a southeasterly heading. At 10:39 PM, 30 seconds before impact, the aircraft flew over the town of San Sebastiano al Vesuvio on a heading of 090°, with the landing gear retracted, engines operating normally, and landing lights on, in heavy rain. At approximately 10:39 PM the aircraft impacted the slope of Mount Somma, which was covered in clouds, at an altitude of approximately 610 metres (2,000 ft) on a heading of about 090° and while banking approximately 20° left. The time of impact was estimated by averaging the readings of three watches found among the wreckage and taking into account the testimonies and the chronological sequence of the final phase of the flight. During the impact the aircraft disintegrated, projecting debris for 80 metres (260 ft), causing small fires to break out.

Some farmers heard the impact of the crash and identified it as having occurred in the forested area of the municipality of Somma Vesuviana. They alerted the Carabinieri station of Sant'Anastasia, triggering the search-and-rescue operations. Reaching the site proved difficult due to the bad weather. All 45 victims died on impact and in the resulting fire.

The failure to switch from visual flight rules to instrument flying, despite the absence of the minimum visibility conditions required for a visual approach, caused the pilot to make too wide a turn, resulting in the aircraft's course deviating to the south at an excessively low altitude leading to controlled flight into terrain.

== Causes ==
The inquiry into the disaster concluded that the pilot's behaviour and the maneuvers he performed were influenced by the following factors:

1. The weather conditions in the area surrounding the airport (cloud cover and precipitation) were variable and worse than those at the airport itself which were made known to the pilot by the field bulletin;
2. An unaccounted for westerly wind pushed the Viscount towards Mount Vesuvius while the pilot had presumably planned an approach taking into account the southerly wind indicated in the field bulletin
3. Possible excessive confidence of the pilot in command, Pasquale Umana, in his knowledge of the orographic characteristics of the area, a confidence derived from the fact that he had carried out many scheduled flights with stopovers at Naples Airport.

== Victims ==
List of passengers and crew members:

=== Crew ===
- Captain Pasquale Umana, 53, of Ozieri, Sardinia
- First Officer Italo Billau, 32, of Alba, Piedmont
- Pilot Officer Giuseppe Camponi, 28, of Torano Nuovo, Abruzzo
- Stewardess Gabriella Cortesi, 23, of Como, Lombardy
- Steward Lucio Sarzi-Amadè, 25, of Cossato, Piedmont

=== Passengers ===
- Lt. Robert Irving Atkinson, 42, of New York, US
- RM James Henry McFadden, 24, of Mansfield, US
- Thomas M. Vendur, 28, of Plumville, US
- Maj. Lawrence Mancini, 38, of Detroit, US
- Fay Mancini, 38, of Detroit, US
- Jill Mancini, 11, of Detroit, US
- Steven Mancini, 8, of Detroit, US
- Olimpia Strigner née Tasselli, 70, of London, England
- Antoine Henry Azan, 27, of Paris, France
- Ubert Azan, 3, of Paris, France
- Mr. Barbillon, of Paris, France
- Mrs. Barbillon, of Paris, France
- Jean Roschie Pourtier Crouzet, 51, of Paris, France
- R. Crouzet, of Paris, France
- Annette Dreyer-Dufer, of Paris, France
- Dr. Charles Dreyer-Dufer, of Paris, France
- Helen Dreyer-Dufer, of Paris, France
- Louis Dreyer-Dufer, 39, of Paris, France
- Irene Giudre, 26, of Paris, France
- Mrs. Gindre, of Paris, France
- Mr. Guignes, of Paris, France
- Mr. Slyper, of Paris, France
- Roger Louis Merard, 16, of Paris, France
- Henry Philippe Guyot D'Anfreville, 59, of Lyon, France
- Antoine Locatelli, 44, of Nice, France
- Mrs. Locatelli, of Nice, France
- Annette Locatelli, of Nice, France
- Madeleine Grazier, 59, of Geneva, Switzerland
- Albert Remuet, of Geneva, Switzerland
- Ms. Guerrier, of Geneva, Switzerland
- Pierette Zani, of Geneva, Switzerland
- Mr. Bovet, of Lausanne, Switzerland
- Mrs. Bovet, of Lausanne, Switzerland
- Giuseppe Willy Bagnoli, 70, of Milan, Italy
- Ciro De Luca, 27, of Naples, Italy
- Fortunato Libonati, 31, of Naples, Italy
- Michele Tessiore, 39, of Turin, Italy
- Aldina Tessiore née Demicini, 40, of Turin, Italy
- Giacomo Tessiore, 12, of Turin, Italy
- Antonio Gaeta, 30, of Salerno, Italy

== See also ==
- List of disasters in Italy by death toll
- 2001 Linate Airport runway collision
