= Via Canosa in Barletta building collapse =

Deadly building collapse in Barletta, Italy

Coordinates: 41°18′55.573″N 16°16′4.59″E

- Date: Thursday, 16 September 1959
- Location: Barletta, Italy
- Deaths: 58
- Injuries: 12

The Via Canosa 7 building collapse was a deadly accident that occurred in Barletta, Italy on 16 September 1959. 58 people were killed and 12 injured in the structural collapse of a five-story housing complex just one-year old.

The collapse was caused by major faults in building procedures and safety standards; one effect was to put the whole Italian construction industry under scrutiny.

== Background ==
During the Italian economic boom, Barletta went through a period of fast industrial growth driven by the thriving textile and leather sectors, together with the increased use of new agricultural technologies. This brought many people into the city from the countryside, which caused a critical housing shortage. New housing had to be built in very short time and cheaply, since laborers' salaries were quite low in the province.

The city had no town plan up until 1967, and land prices were cheap, so any available spot was targeted with new construction proposals. This condition was widespread in the whole country since many big cities were being rebuilt after World War II, and the pressing need for masons and artisans led inexperienced contractors, who lacked both skill and ethics, into the business.

Community officers, who were conscious of the housing needs and often held a stake in the ventures themselves, were prone to issue licenses readily.

This phenomenon is widely known in Italy as Edilizia Selvaggia (wild building). It had many consequences, leading to accidents and deaths in the following decades and creating an unruly approach to the building business still visible today.

== Previous accidents ==
Less than a year before, on 8 December 1952, two 3-story buildings located in Via Magenta, a low-income residential area of Barletta, collapsed under their own weight. They were built in tuff, a kind of rock widely available and traditionally used for smaller buildings.

The collapse caused 17 deaths, and its images were shown both in cinemas and in newspapers, shocking Italians and reminding them of the bombings of many cities in the war.

== Via Canosa 7 collapse ==
At 6:40 a.m., just after dawn on 16 September 1959, a rumble was heard in the town. A thick cloud of smoke and powder filled the streets around Via Canosa, while the building at number 7, just a few meters from the railroad crossing, caved in.

At first the neighbors feared an earthquake had struck the city and fled the surrounding buildings. After assessing the situation, many began helping with the rescue operations, but little could be done. The collapse happened while people in the building were sleeping, so no one had time to flee.

Of the 70 inhabitants, 12 were saved from the debris and 58 died.

The first responders managed to bring only one crane to the scene, but could count on help from townsfolk, soldiers from the nearby barracks, and city guards. Among the volunteers were Mayor Giuseppe Palmitessa, many farmers and workers from the city's factories, and even several monks.

Rescuers later used plows to move the rubble, since they were sure that no survivors could be found under the mountain of debris a few meters high.

The last survivor, Luigi Superti, was found after 36 hours, but later died from his wounds. Doctors at the local hospital, led by chief surgeon Ruggiero Lattanzio, organized a full-scale mobilization to cope with the need for medical help, medicines, and blood.

== First assessment of building shortcomings ==
Initial speculations of a collapse due to vibrations from a train in transit on the nearby railroad were dismissed after it was clear that the building had severe structural faults, as discovered by Chief Engineer Rivelli of the Civil Engineering Corps.

The concrete had a high sand content and lacked the required reinforcing bars. Trash was used as filler in the walls, and the cavities of bricks were case-hardened with low-grade clay and dirt. Hollow bricks were used instead of solid ones in floor slabs. Foundations were almost missing, the whole structure leaning on old walls from a partially demolished single-storey bus depot, built in 1942 under war constraints.

Builders thought that those walls would have been enough as a structural frame, but failed to understand that the old depot and walls were themselves without foundations. In charge of the structural design was a local 37-year-old civil engineer, who got only a temporary permit to practice.

The flats were finished in September 1958, and sold out just a few months before in the summer. In February 1959 the building was wrongly deemed as "corresponding to the submitted design" by a civic officer, who licensed the building without effectively checking the works. Builders unlawfully changed the design, adding three new flats to the 17 authorized.

Immediately the owners issued complaints about inch-wide cracks in the walls, but masons underplayed the problem, stating that those were normal settlement movements.

== Aftermath ==
The news came as a shock to the whole country, since many knew or suspected the unsafe and criminal practices of the construction business but had little grasp of the consequences. President Giovanni Gronchi, along with the main newspapers, called for justice in order to severely punish those responsible. Many top journalists, including Indro Montanelli and Umberto Eco, covered the event and its consequences.

L'Espresso launched a full-scale journalistic investigation, documenting bad business practices, government collusion and criminal activities. The article, "I Pirati del Cemento" ("Concrete Pirates"), was a direct accusation of the whole industry and sparked a nationwide cry for justice.

The builders of Via Canosa 7 were prosecuted in the Trani court, the trial obtaining widespread news coverage from local and national news sources. A technical survey confirmed the abuses and poor workmanship of the builders, underlining the major role in the tragedy of the many design shortcomings and irregularities. The collapse originated with a failure of the underlying old walls, deemed inadequate in size and type, worsened by the lack of solid foundations and by the bad statical condition of the newly built walls.

President Gronchi followed the inquiry, asking for copies of the technical survey and of the proceedings.

The trial ended with the conviction of all the defendants, including the builders, the engineer, a fixer, and the chief of the town's technical office. A new law was approved by the Parliament, improving building safety and forcing mandatory control by the Civic Engineers Corps.

The tragedy's ground remained unused for many years, earning the nickname "The Graveyard" by locals. Rumors of ghost sightings and noises became widespread in the most superstitious dwellers, and the place was deemed to be cursed.

In the 1980s the whole block was rebuilt from scratch as low-income flats built in concrete. Notwithstanding locals protests, nothing was left to remember the tragedy except a road marked "Via 16 Settembre 1959". Upon the "cursed" ground in 1993 a new road bridge was built.

In 2009, five decades after the disaster, an exposition was held in Barletta to remember the victims of the tragedy. A national meeting of engineers, architects and surveyors, along with a DVD and book release were held on the 50th anniversary of the disaster.
