= Castel Bolognese train disaster =

1962 disaster in Italy

Details
- Date: 8 March 1962; 64 years ago 1:56 a.m.
- Location: Castel Bolognese railway station
- Operator: Ferrovie dello Stato
- Incident type: Derailment
- Cause: Speeding through construction zone

Statistics
- Trains: Diretto 152
- Deaths: 13
- Injured: 127

The Castel Bolognese train disaster was a major accident that occurred on 8 March 1962, in the Castel Bolognese railway station, near Ravenna, in Italy.

The Diretto 152 night train between Bari and Milan derailed at 1:56 a.m. shortly before entering the station, killing 13 and wounding 127.

== Derailment ==
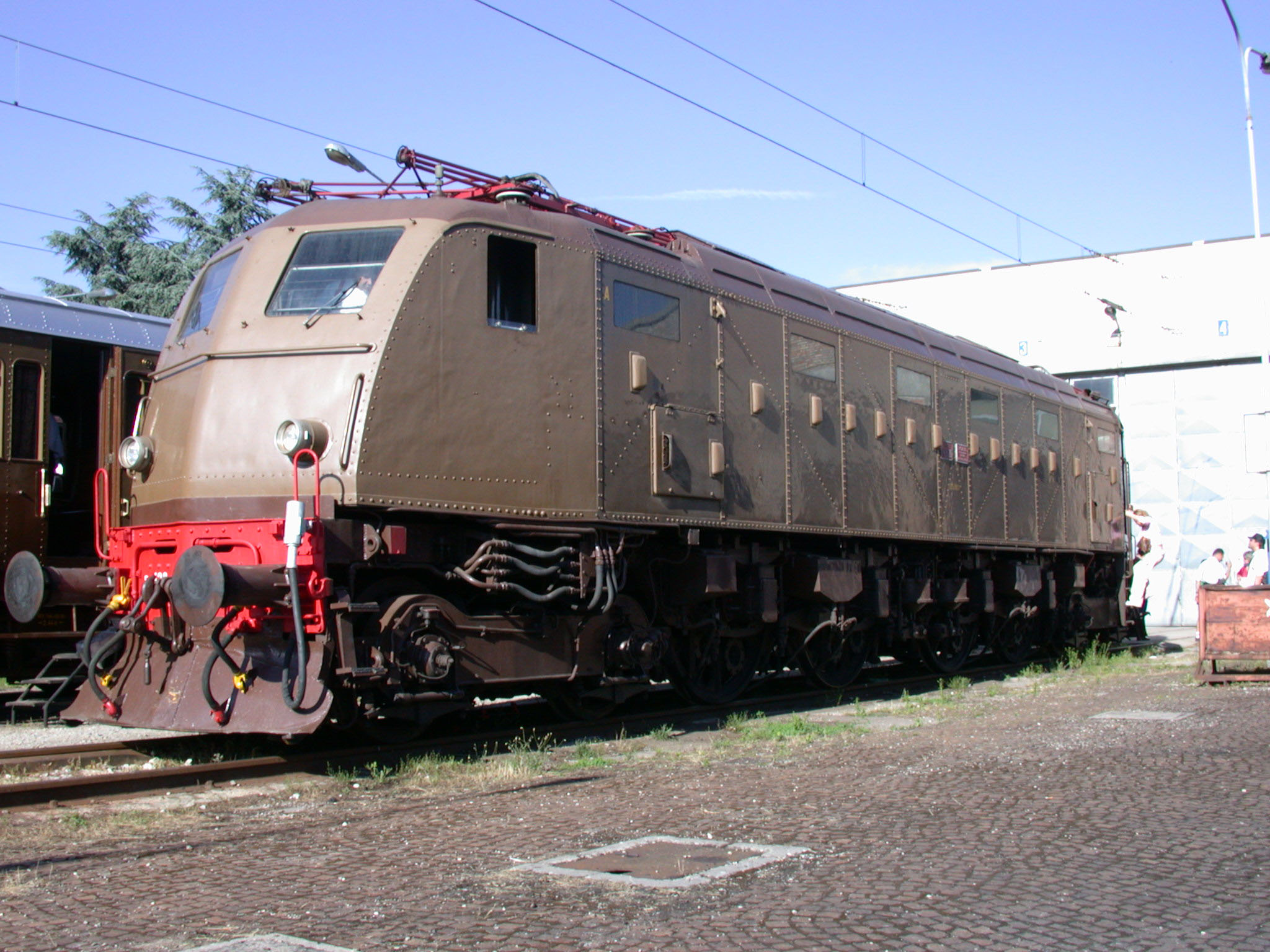
A third series FS Class 428 similar to that in the disaster

The 152 engine, FS Class E428.217, was helmed by engineer Ennio Covacci and assistant engineer Otello Manzi, from Ancona railway depot; the train was traveling northbound at 90 km/h (56 mph), with about 500 passengers coming from many provinces of Southern Italy. The daily train was nicknamed Train of Hope, since it was used mostly to bring people from the poor south to the wealthy industrial cities in Northern Italy, looking for jobs and a better life.

The train was supposed to swap track, due to maintenance work on the northbound track. A special speed limitation of 30 km/h (19 mph) had been enforced by means of an M40 mandatory alert, but the fixed signals reported condition normal and the train failed to slow down.

While entering the switch between the first and the second track, the engine derailed at 102 km/h (63 mph) and fell to the right side. It kept skidding for about 100 meters (330 ft), coming to a stop against the station's water refill tower.

The first carriage, a luggage car, followed the engine and overturned to the left. Some poultry cages inside shattered, and dozens of hens were set free. A shipment of truffles received minor damage, but its strong smell became a distinctive memory for the emergency responders. A shoes load from Marche craftsmen was stored on a secondary luggage car, and was severely damaged when the car hit a station building.

The third car, a Corbellini coach, was thrown into a nearby field, part of Podere Borgo farmland, with minor injuries to the occupants. Less lucky were the fourth car's passengers (a Corbellini too). The coach turned to a side, and a rail section raised by the previous cars entered its floor, lifting the car and piercing its body. Most of the 13 people killed were caused by the steel rail.

The last three cars luckily managed to stay upside. The fifth car was on a small bridge above a stream, who sustained little to no damage when the coach skewed slightly.

== Rescue operations ==
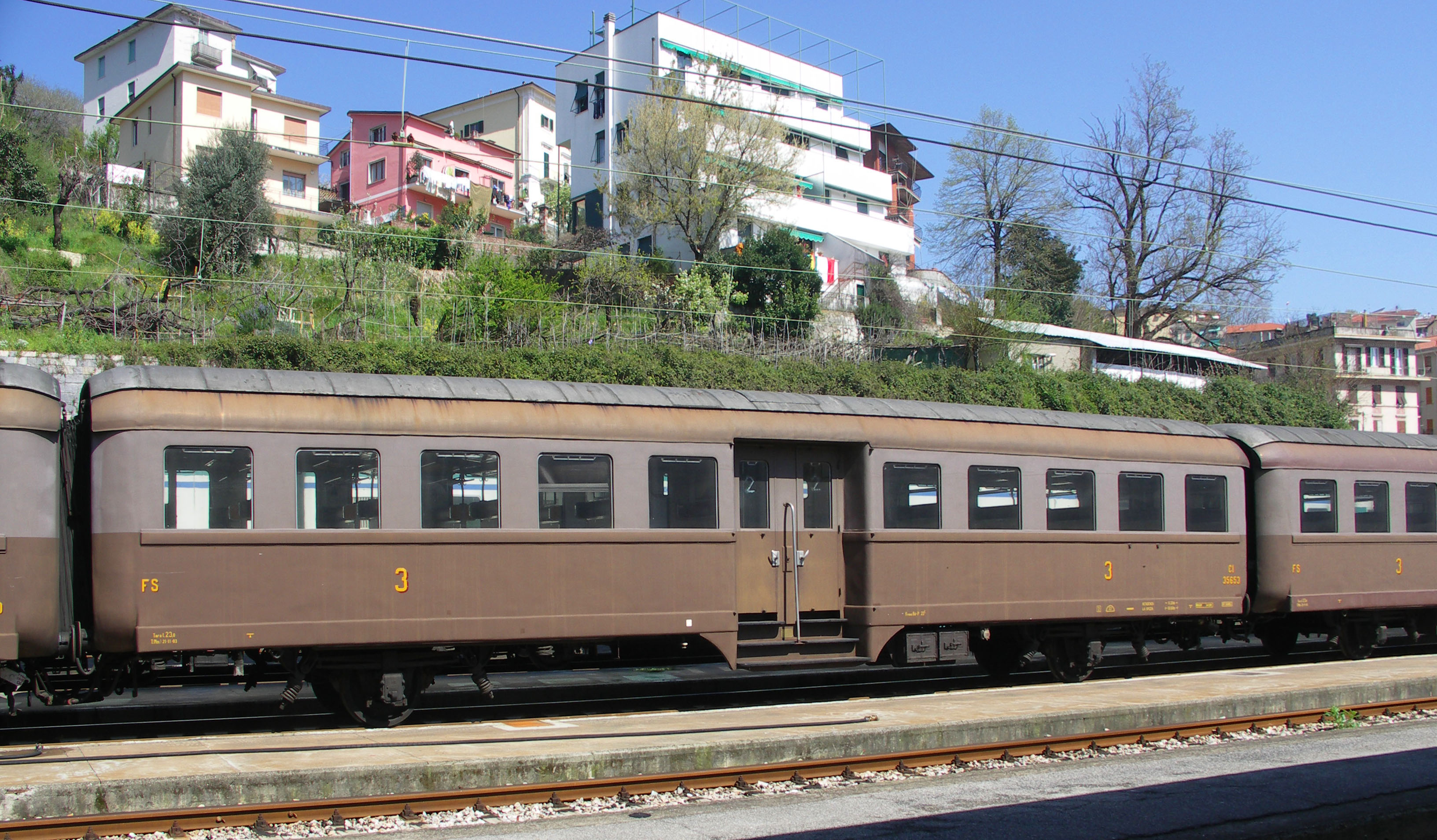
A two-axle Corbellini coach

First response came from Castel Bolognese railwaymen, led by senior station master Giovanni Tarlazzi. Alerted by the crash, they left their homes and posts to run to the scene, providing immediate relief to the wounded. Chief Shunter Romano Corelli managed to break the right-hand glass of the cabin, smashing it with a stone and allowing the engineers to flee the crushed cockpit.

Survivors were roaming the scene in shock, impairing rescue operations. Some tried to recover their luggage well before the rescue operations were over and the wreckage safe.

No central emergency management existed at the time in Italy, so rescue was provided mostly by volunteers and nearby hospital, with little coordination. Responders later denounced lack of stretchers, torches and spreaders. Ambulances were called from Imola, Faenza and other towns, more than needed and getting in each other's way.

After more people from a nearby town joined the efforts, searching for survivors and removing the deceased from the wreck, railwaymen Balestrazzi and Monti begun work on re-establishing the northern track to get the railway back to at least minimal service condition. Survivors from the train saw the railwaymen, and menaced them thinking they were responsible for the disaster. They had to rush back to their depot, and wait until survivors were evacuated.

Many people were initially deemed missing, and the nearby stream was searched fearing someone had been thrown out of the coaches and could have drowned. Those fears resulted groundless.

The corpses were stored in the nearby San Francesco church, still undergoing rebuilding works after World War II: this was the first opening of the sanctuary after the war's end in 1945, and the only one before being ultimately finished three years later.

== Auction ==
As customary, owners of the goods shipped in the luggage cars claimed damages and were reimbursed, while the surviving perishable goods were auctioned off by the railway operator Ferrovie dello Stato.

Among the recovered perishable goods there was cow meat, fish, rabbits, poultry and truffles. The shoes were recovered and sent to the central Lost and Found office.

A shocked dog was found in the station, most probably a survivor from the disaster. It was kept by the railwaymen and nicknamed Carlone after a station porter. The dog lived in the station, but was terrorized by the tracks

== Aftermath ==
Blame was put on engineer Ennio Covacci, who was found guilty of multiple involuntary killing.

According to the sentence, the derailment was caused by Covacci missing a speed limit, most probably due to an unusual signaling used at the time: the green signal allowed for full speed, except for some limits stated on the special M40 bulletin. Covacci received the bulletin but misread some limitations.

The Corbellini car into the Borgo's field was recovered by means of a heavy-load crane. Initially set upside into a road, was later raised on new bogies taken from the scrapyard. A short rail was built to bring it back to the tracks.
