= Santa Maria della Pace (disambiguation) =

Santa Maria della Pace is a church in Rome.

Santa Maria della Pace may also refer to the following Italian churches:

- Santa Maria della Pace, Brescia, Lombardy
- Santa Maria della Pace, Castelbolognese, Emilia Romagna
- Santa Maria della Pace, Massa Martana, Perugia, Umbria
- Santa Maria della Pace, Milan, Lombardy
- Santa Maria della Pace, Naples, Campania

== See also ==
- Santa Maria della Pace e Santa Rita, Benevento, a church in Campania, Italy
