= Feoli and Cicada Chapels =

Chapels in the church of Santa Maria del Popolo, Rome

Coordinates: 41.9114°N 12.4768°E

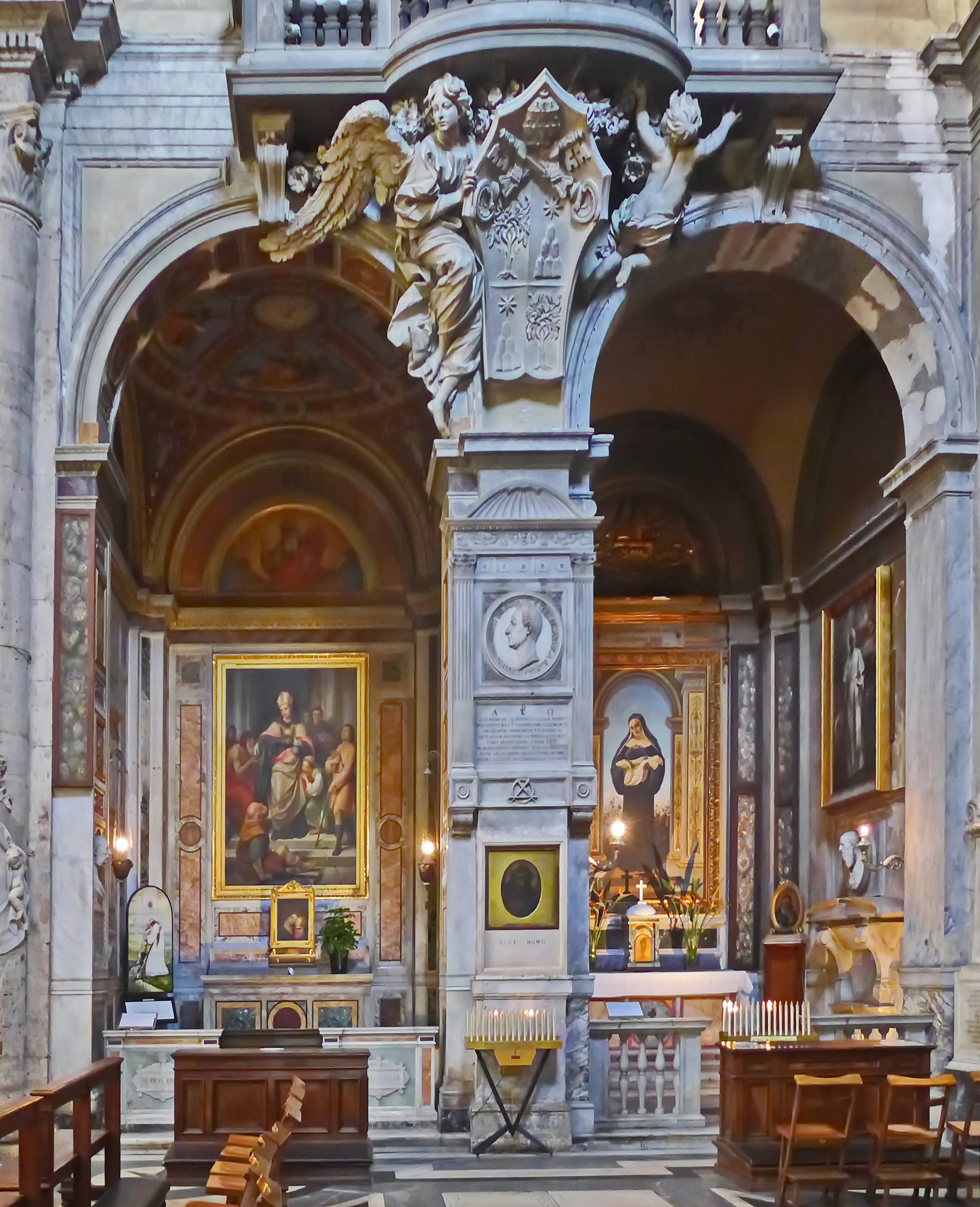
The two small chapels from the transept

The Chapel of Saint Thomas of Villanova and the Chapel of Saint Rita (otherwise the Feoli and Cicada Chapels) (Italian: Cappelle di San Tommaso da Villanova e di Santa Rita) are two small chapels opening in the right transept of the Basilica of Santa Maria del Popolo. They are relatively insignificant in terms of artistic value compared to the other side chapels of the church.

== History ==
Borgia Chapel

The first members of the Borgia family who were buried the Basilica of Santa Maria del Popolo were the two sons of the pope, Pier Luigi de Borgia (†1488) and Giovanni Borgia (†1497), the Dukes of Gandía. During the reign of Pope Julius II the widowed Duchess of Gandía, María Enríquez de Luna asked permission to have the remains of the dukes transferred from Rome to Gandía. The pope ordered the Augustinians of Santa Maria del Popolo, under pain of excommunication, to allow the exhumations.

The right for obtaining a funeral chapel in the basilica had been secured in 1484 by Giorgio della Croce, apostolic secretary and the second husband of Vannozza dei Cattanei, the former mistress of Pope Alexander VI. Giorgio della Croce was buried there in 1486. Vannozza, a rich businesswoman in her own right, became the patroness of the Augustinian convent. The Vicar General of the Congregation, Gaudientio di Bargi gave her permission on 24 February 1500 to acquire the chapel (the first to the right of the high altar), and furnish it according to her wish. On 4 March 1501 Vannozza commissioned Andrea Bregno and Giovanni di Larigo to design a tabernacle and an altar. She also commissioned a painting of Saint Lucy, the patron of her chapel. The painting supposedly portrayed Vannozza herself and remained in the chapel until its demolition in 1658. After her third husband, Carlo Canale (†1500) Vannozza herself was buried there when she died in 1518.

Vanozza's tomb remained in the chapel until at least 1576 because in this year a copy was made of the funerary inscription. The large Carrara marble tombstone was rediscovered in the Basilica of San Marco in 1947 where it had been used as a paving block. The paving there was laid down between 1653 and 1659 indicating that the large tombstone was removed from its place before that time and probably sold to some marble worker.

Twin chapels

After the Borgia Chapel was demolished two new identical chapels were built during Bernini's intervention in 1658 at the expense of the convent. The left one, which was already dedicated to St. Thomas of Villanova at the time of its construction, was given first to Abbot Benedetto Mazzini in 1671. He planned to use it as a family burial place. The chapel was obtained in 1857 by Pietro Feoli who commissioned Giambattista Benedetti to completely redesign it in Neo-Renaissance style.

The other chapel inherited the old dedication to Saint Lucy but it was restored and re-dedicated to St. Rita of Cascia in 1901 by Cardinal Agostino Ciasca.

== Description ==
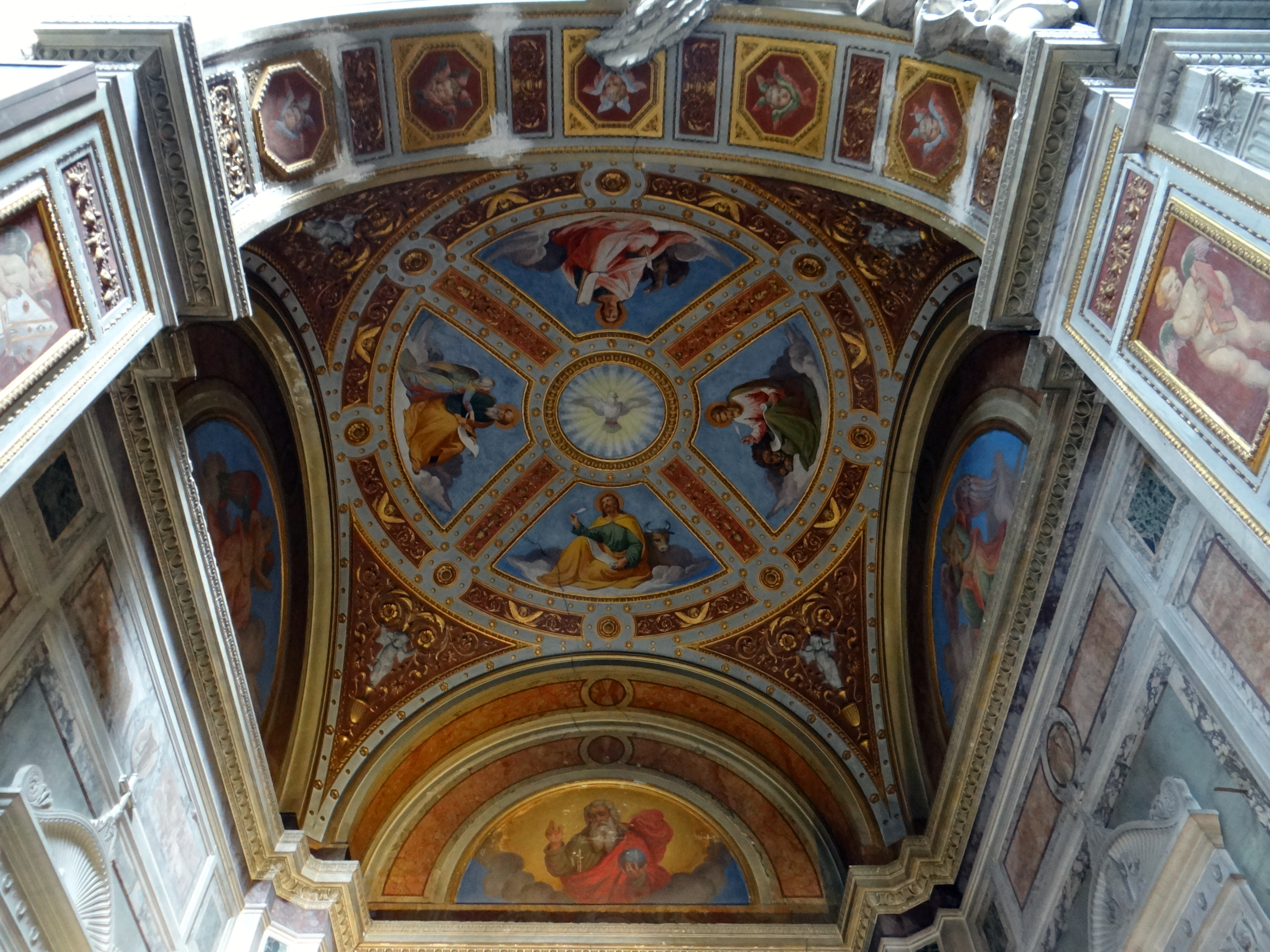
Painted Renaissance Revival decoration on the vault of the Feoli Chapel by Casimiro Brugnone de Rossi.

There was a Baroque painting on the altar of the Chapel of St. Thomas by Fabrizio Chiari depicting St. Thomas of Villanova Distributing Alms in the 17th century which is now placed near the sacristy. The current Renaissance Revival decoration of the chapel was executed in 1858 by Casimiro Brugnone de Rossi who was a favoured artist at the time of Pope Pius IX. He painted the Four Evangelists and the dove of the Holy Spirit on the dome and God the Father in the lunette. The new altar painting of St. Thomas of Villanueva Distributing Alms by the same artist is dated to 1860. It is a more conventional work than the previous Baroque painting. There are many 19th century family tombs and memorials in the chapel.

In the Chapel of St. Rita the altarpiece is a painting by Giovanni Piancastelli. (The original altarpiece of Saint Lucy by Luigi Garzi is lost.) The sepulchral monument of Odoardo Cicada, the Bishop of Sagona by Guglielmo della Porta is dated around 1545. The Renaissance wall tomb followed the design of Michelangelo's Late Renaissance monument for Cecchino Bracci in Santa Maria in Aracoeli but much of it was later demolished. An anonymous drawing in Windsor Castle (Cod. 201 Albani) preserved a sketch of its original form. Today the only surviving parts are the marble bust, the sarcophagus resting on strigillated supports and a pedestal with the coat-of-arms (a crowned eagle).

The marble slab of his relative, Cardinal Giovanni Battista Cicala (†1570) is set in the floor. The tombstone is decorated with the coat-of-arms of the cardinal on a bronze shield. It was commissioned by the Cardinal's nephew and heir, Carlo Cicada, the Bishop of Albenga. The tombstone was later truncated; the original decorative border with the Cicada eagles in the corners was lost but a drawing in the Royal Library preserved its original look. Both of the Cicada tombs were transferred from the original Cybo Chapel when it was demolished around 1680.

== Feoli tombs ==
In the 19th century the Feolis used the Chapel of St. Thomas of Villanueva as their family burial place. The oldest monument was dedicated by Pietro Feoli in 1858 to "the sweetest and best uncle", Agostino Feoli who had died two years before. He was the richest banker and industrialist of the Papal States in the middle of the 19th century. The ashes of Luigia Bartolucci and Ferdinando Feoli were placed in the chapel in 1859. These two monuments are similar wall tombs in neo-Quattrocento style with finely carved vegetal decoration, shell shaped gables, the family coats-of-arms and the portraits of the deceased set in medaillons.

On the pillars of the arch are the twin monuments of Luigi Feoli (died in 1870) and a young boy, Carlo Feoli (died in 1873) both by Giacomo Cerulli. They are simple, symmetrical Neo-Classical funerary monuments with the busts of the deceased in oval niches.

== Gallery ==
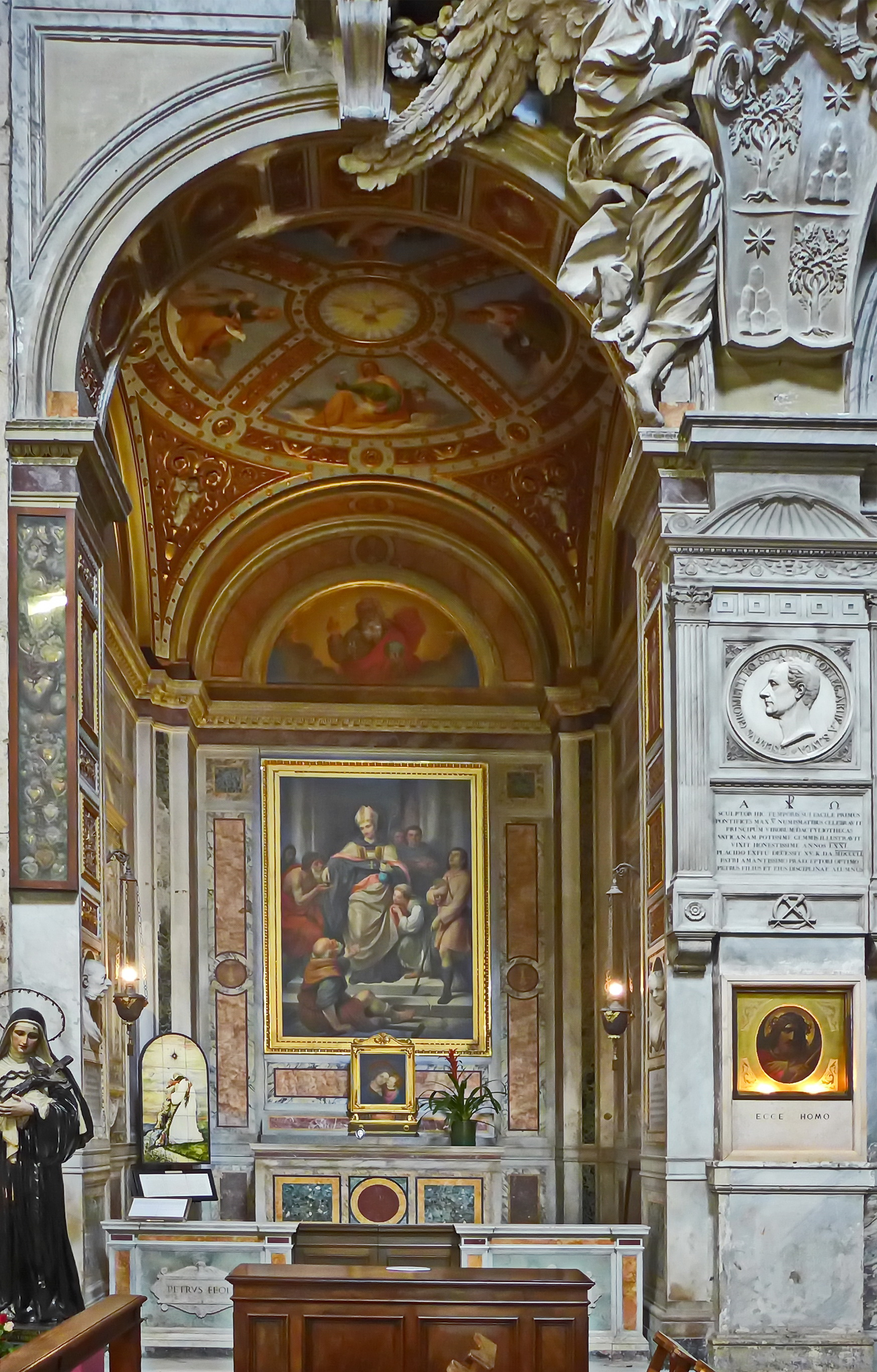
The Feoli Chapel

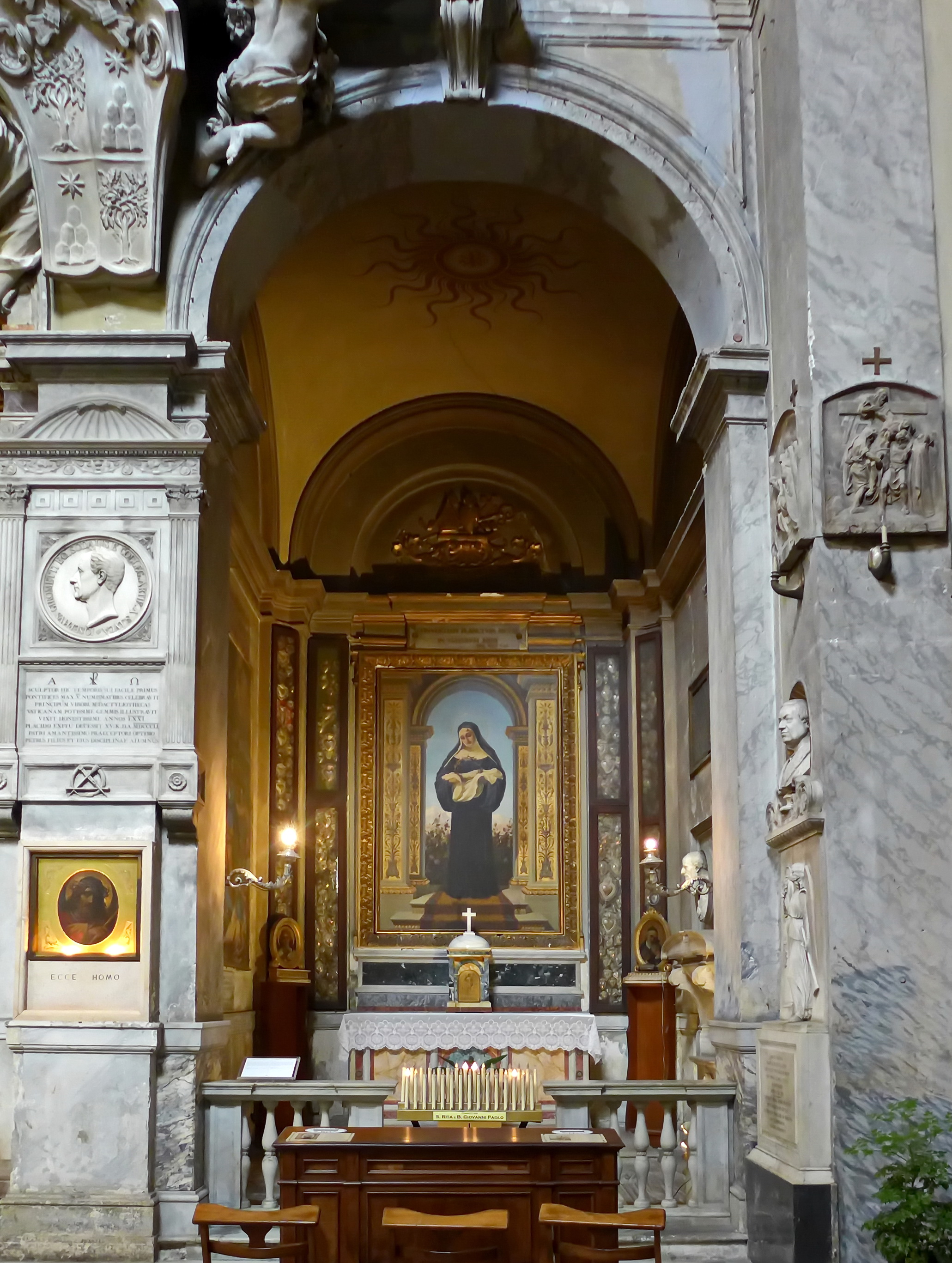
The Cicada Chapel

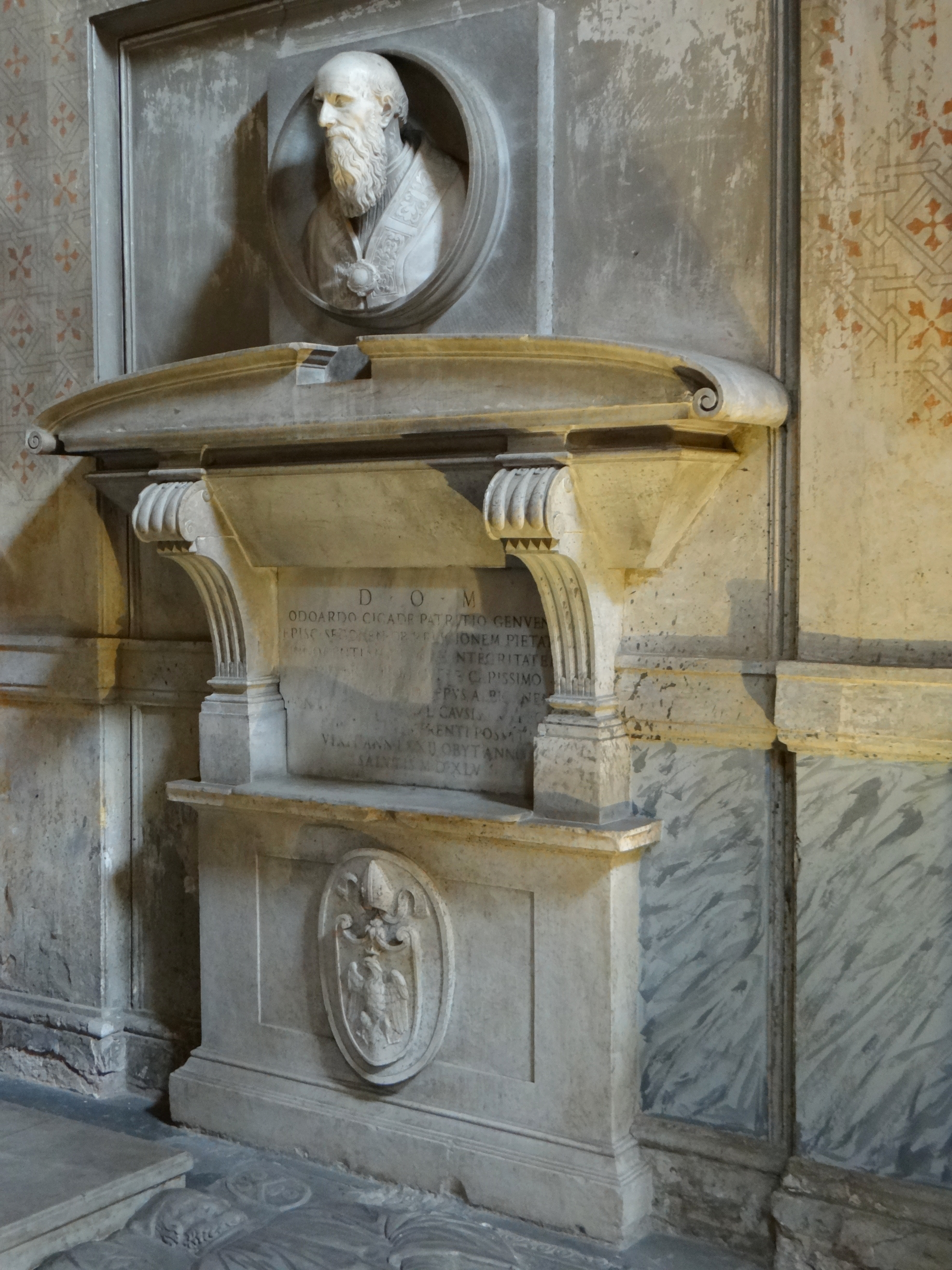
Fragmentary tomb of Odoardo Cicada

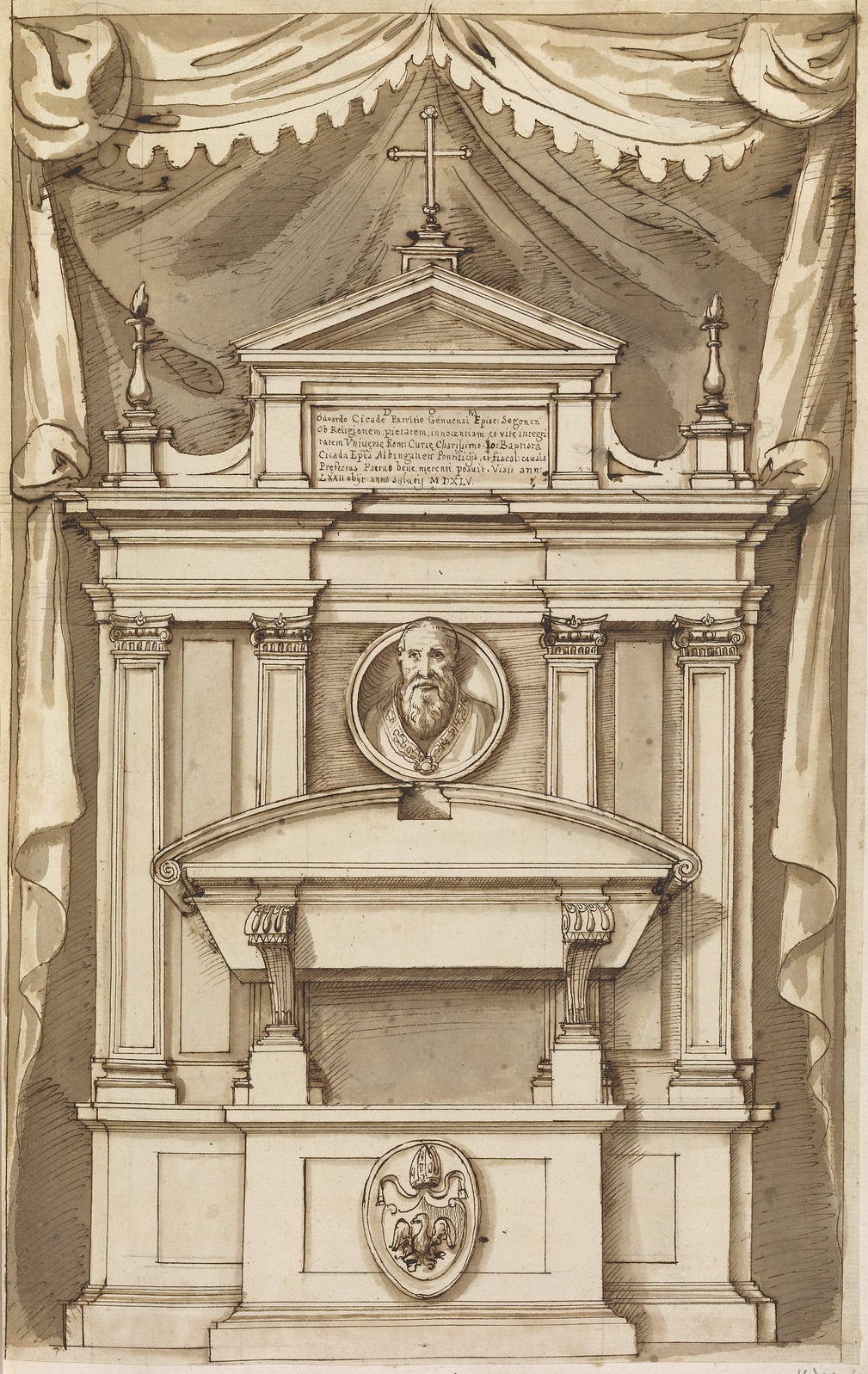
The tomb of Odoardo Cicada in original form (drawing)

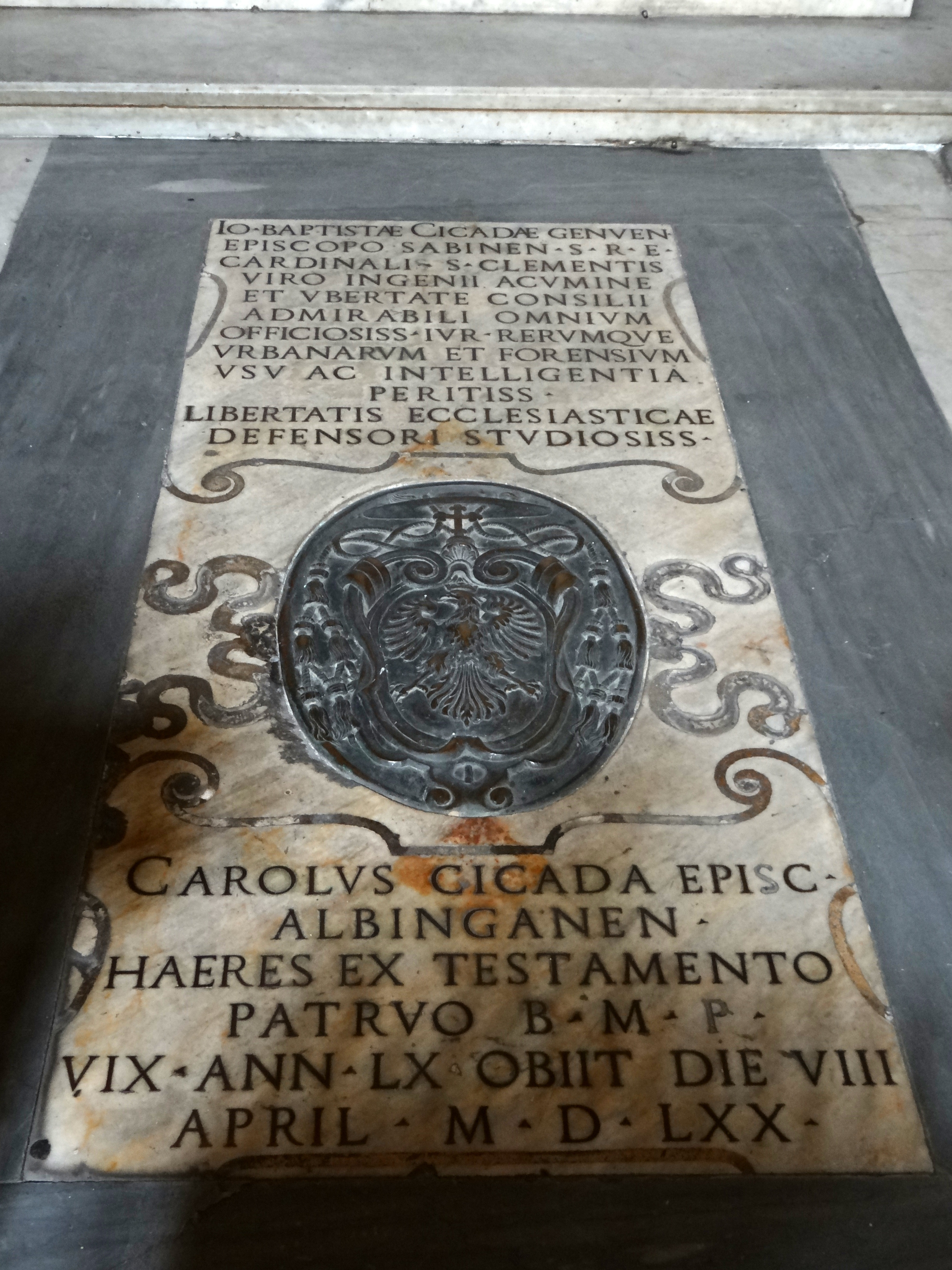
The tombstone of Giovanni Battista Cicada

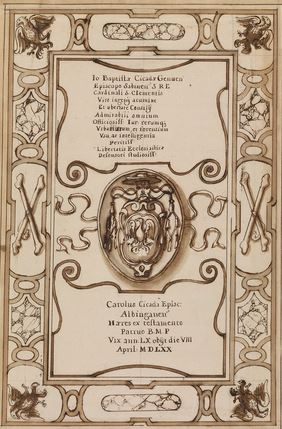
The tombstone of Giovanni Battista Cicada in original form (drawing)

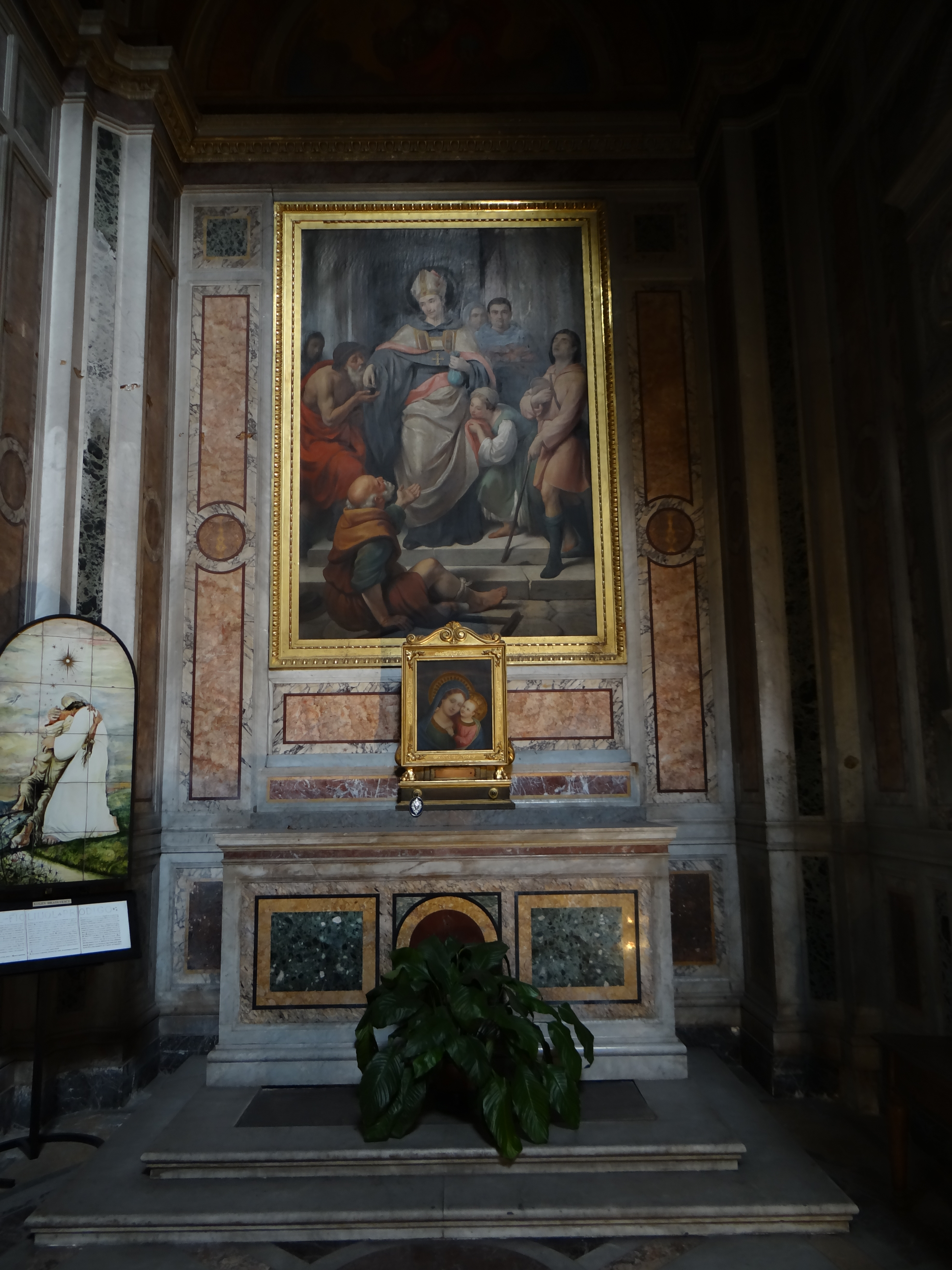
The altarpiece of the St Thomas Chapel

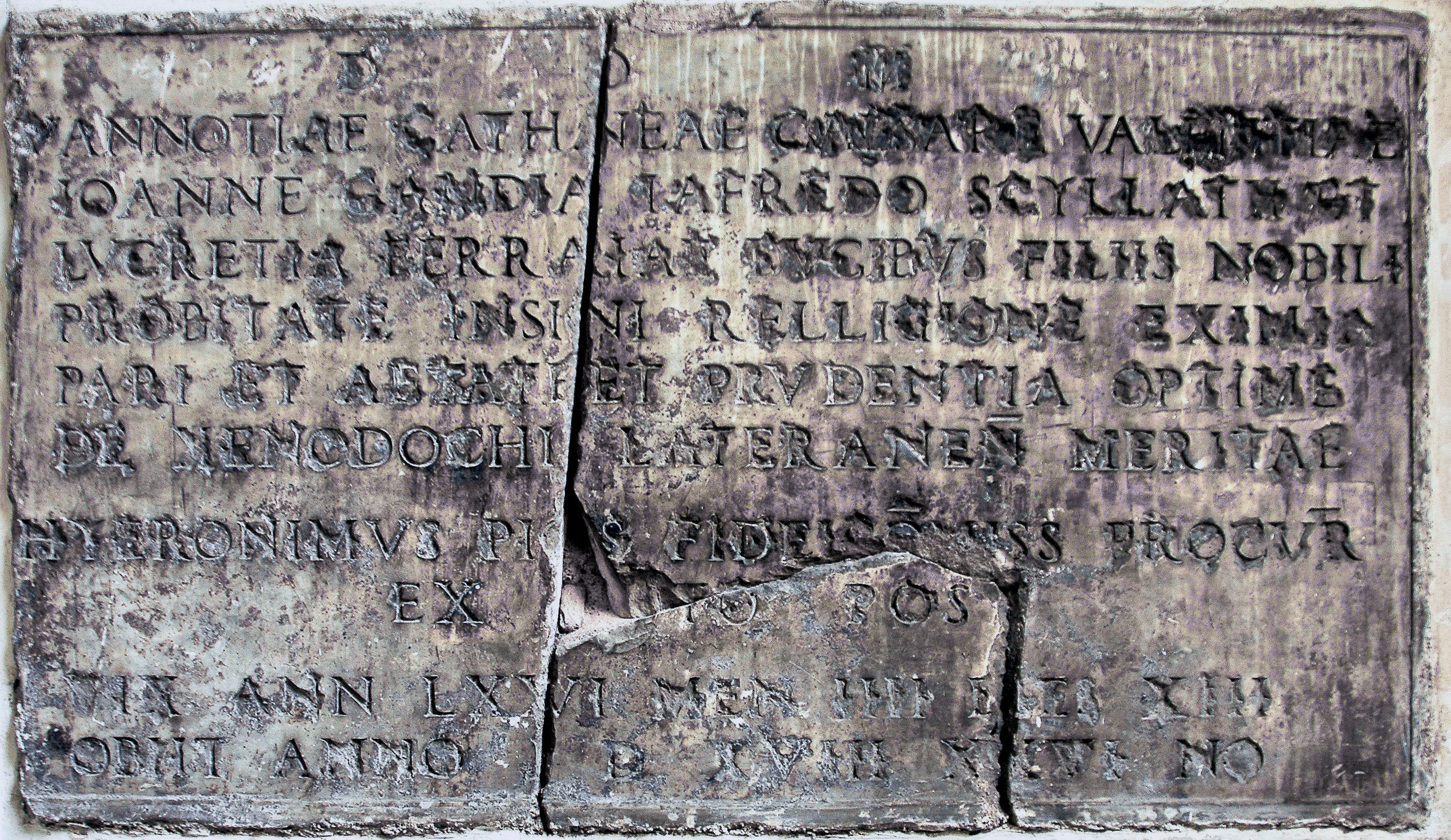
The epitaph of Vannozza Cattanei (now in the Basilica of San Marco)

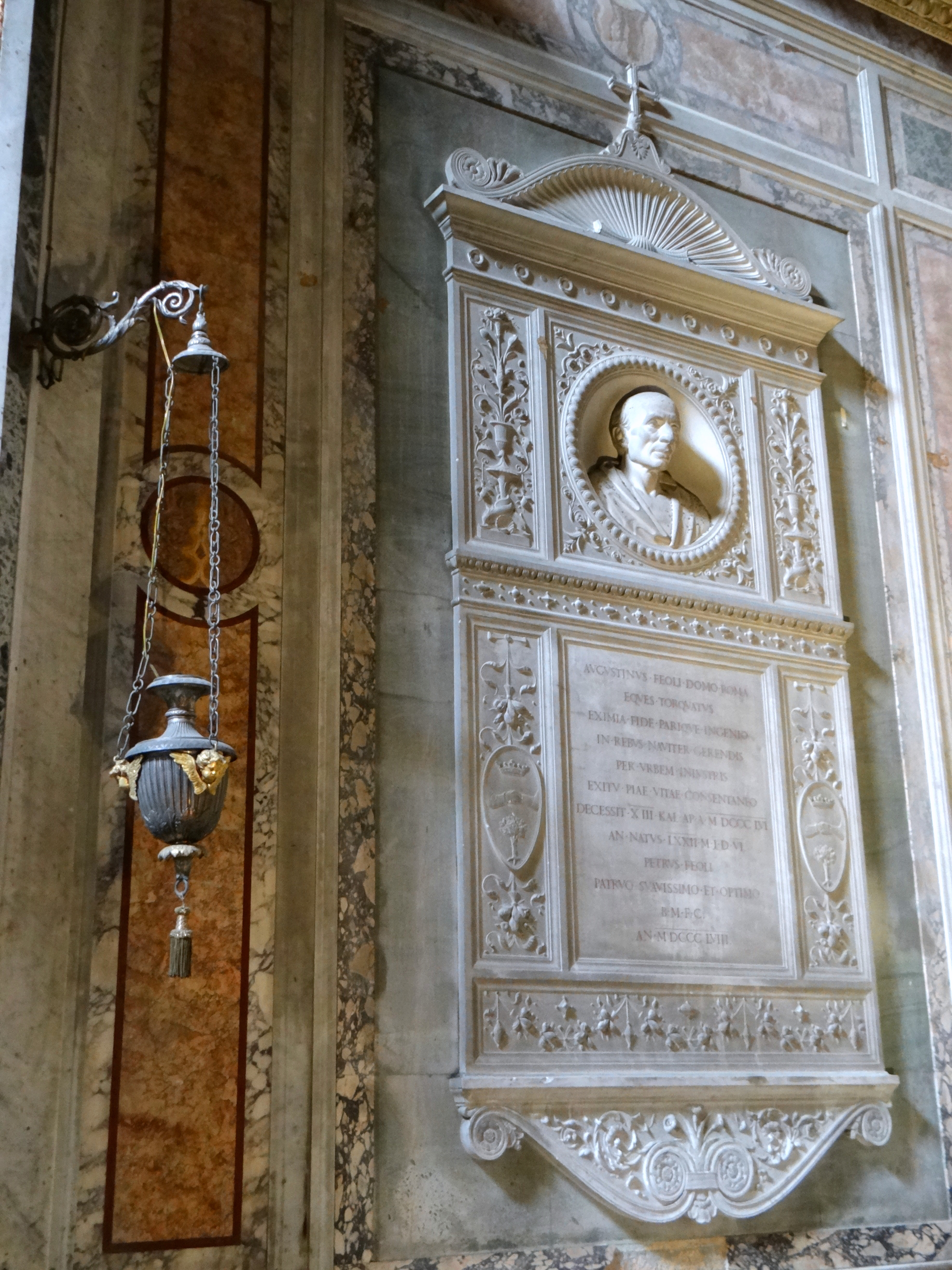
Funeral monument of Agostino Feoli

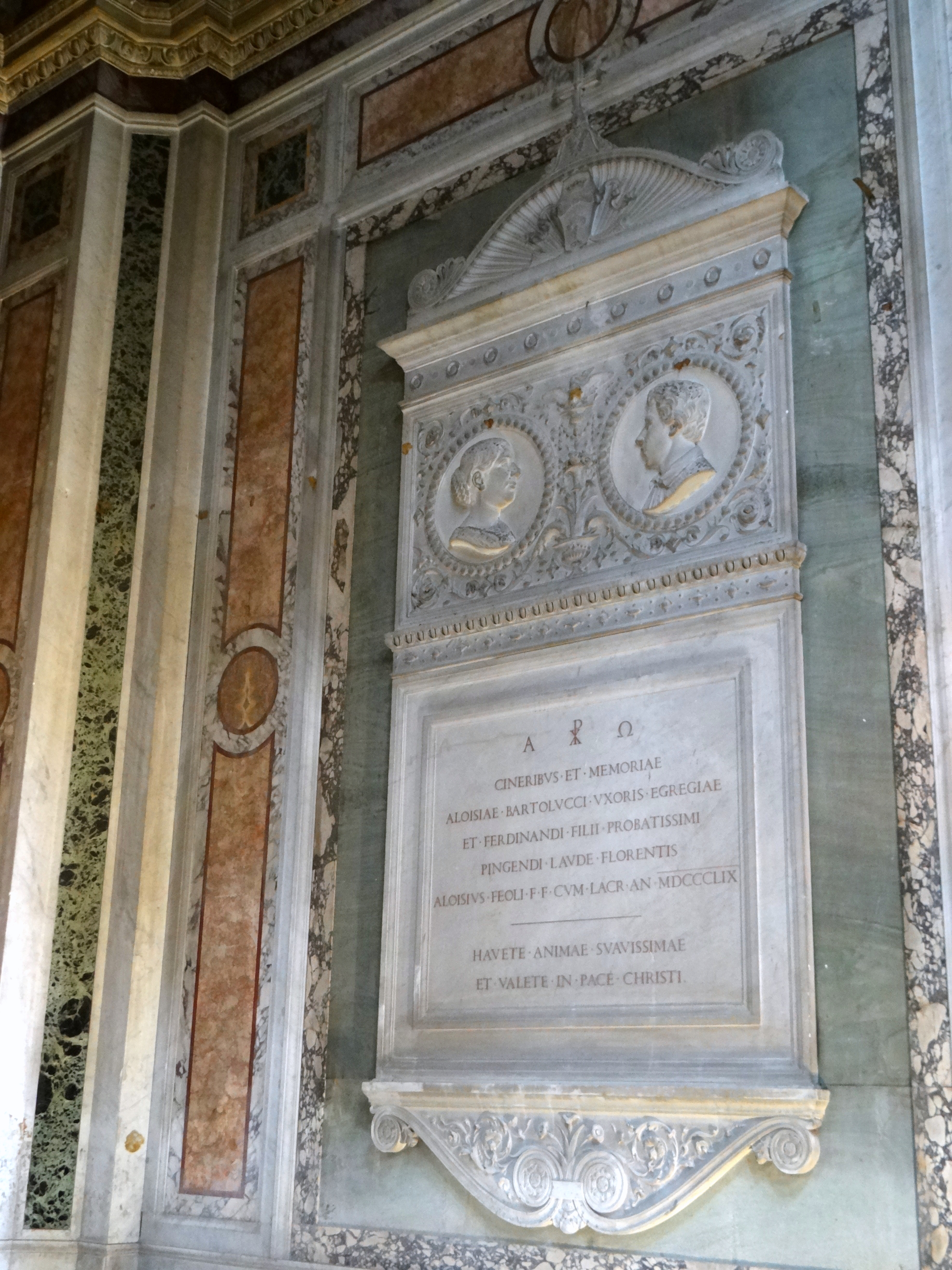
Funeral monument of Luigia Bartolucci and Ferdinando Feoli

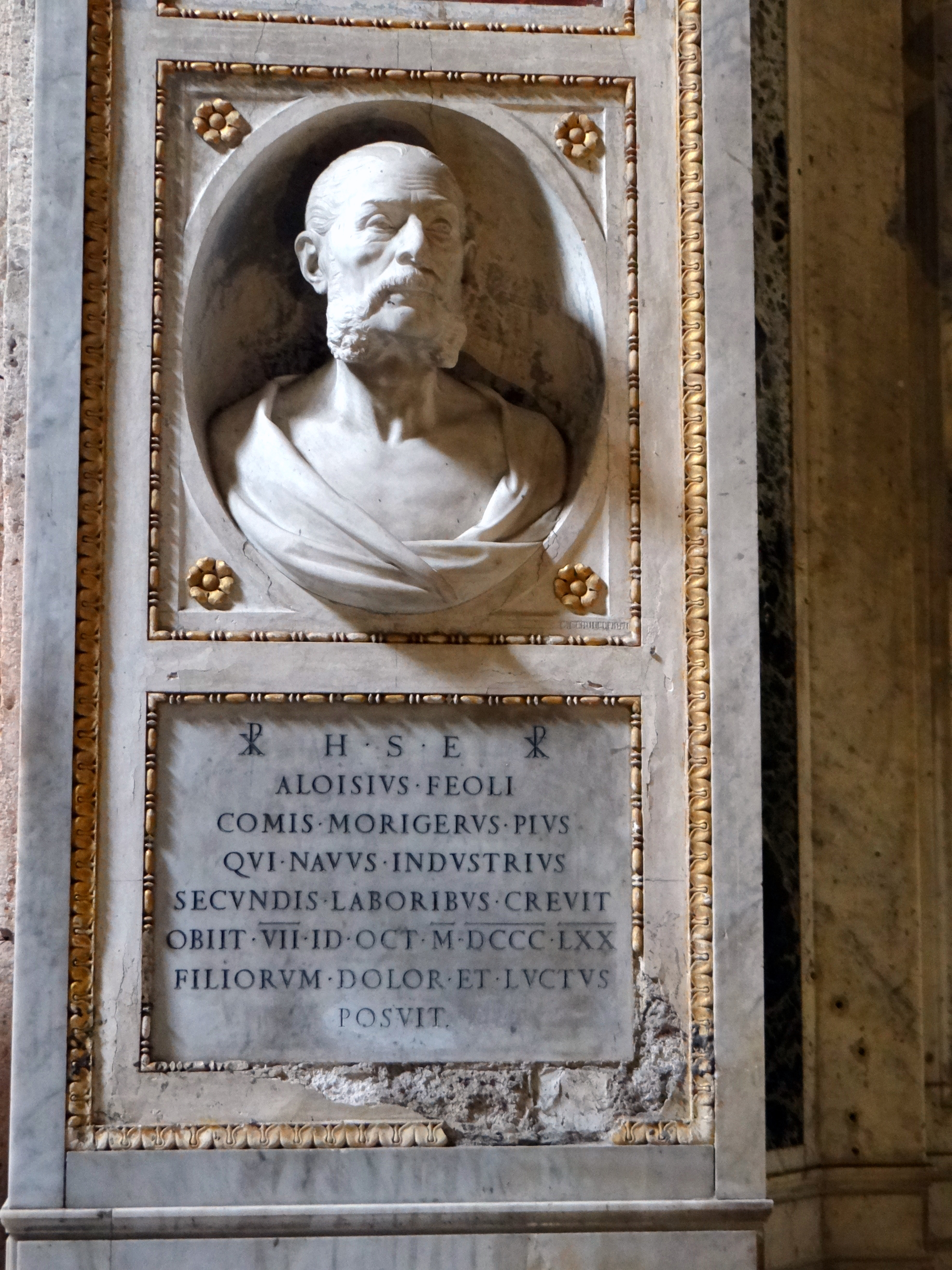
Funeral monument of Luigi Feoli

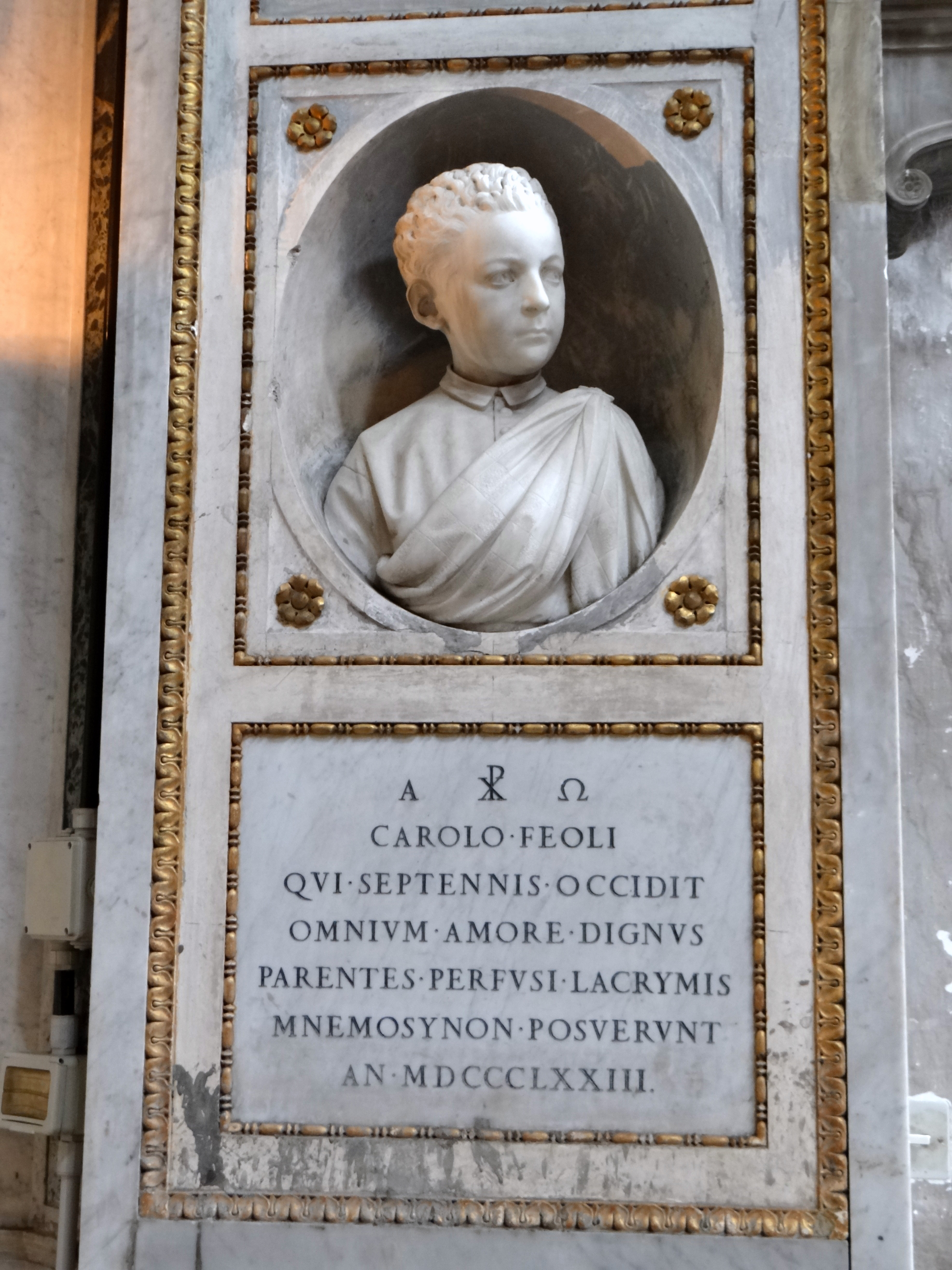
Funeral monument of Carlo Feoli

== Bibliography ==
- Ilaria Miarelli Mariani: La pittura, in Santa Maria del Popolo. Storia e restauri, eds. Ilaria Miarelli-Mariani and Maria Richiello, Istituto Poligrafico e Zecca dello Stato, 2009.
