= San Petronio, Castelbolognese =

Church building in Castel Bolognese, Italy

Coordinates: 44.318291°N 11.798769°E

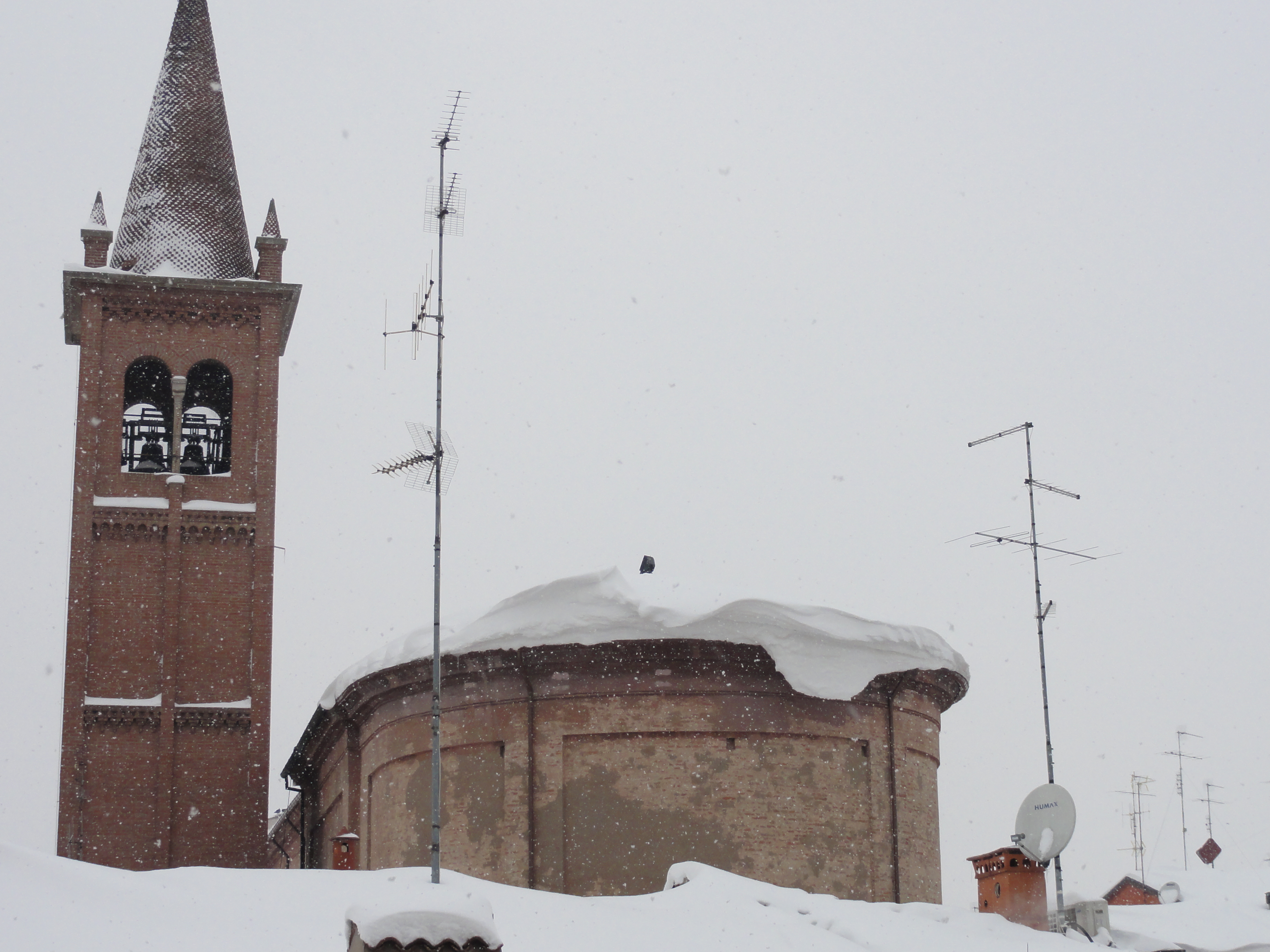
View of apse and bell-tower

San Petronio is a Roman Catholic church located on Via Garavini #19 in the town of Castelbolognese, in the region of Emilia Romagna, Italy.

== History ==
A church at the site is documented by 1396 as a church in the parish of Campiano, a neighborhood of Castelbolognese. The church occupied the site now represented by the third chapel, dedicated to St Catherine. This church was enlarged in 1428. The facade was restored in 1616. The main altar was moved in 1574 to the site at the center of the main chapel, and replaced by a tabernacle. In 1592, the patronage of cardinal Ginnasi brought to this church a column taken from the church of San Michele in Monte Sant'Angelo (near Gargano). It is presently in the second altar in the left nave.

A bell-tower first added in 1438, rose 35 meters, but was first repaired in its original design after an earthquake in 1781. It would eventually be razed by bombings on December 24, 1944.

== Interior ==
The sober facade has three doors, each flanked by Doric pilasters. The roof is richly carved with cassetoni by Alessandro Della Nave and Antonio Villa.

The main altar (1867) is decorated with scagliola. In the rear of the choir is a 16th-century, polychrome terracotta statuary group depicting a Crucifixion Scene by Alfonso Lombardi. Atop an entablature is an oval depiction of St Petronio, by Felice Giani. Flanking the main altar are an organ and another depiction of St Petronius, patron of Bologna and Castel Bolognese, by Angelo Gottarelli. A wooden statue of San Petronio in the nave is a copy of the 12th-century statue in the Duomo of Bologna, donated to Pope Pius IX by Bologna.

The first altar on the right is dedicated to St Andrea Avellino and has a statue of St Therese of Lisieux.

The first chapel houses a Visitation flanked by canvases with St Jerome and Lawrence, all by Alfonso Cittadella. The second chapel houses an altarpiece depicting Saints Dominic and Emidius and a Holy Martyr, attributed to Benedetto dal Buono while in a window we find a 15th-century Madonna del Rosario attributed to Giovanni da Riolo. The third chapel has a statue of St Jerome by Alfonso Lombardi and another of St John the Baptist by Ottavio Toselli. In the last chapel is a depiction of St Michael Archangel attributed to Francesco Longhi. The church has a replica of the Grotto of Lourdes, created in 1933 with gypsum rock extracted from Casola Valsenio.
