= Guglielmo della Porta =

Italian architect and sculptor

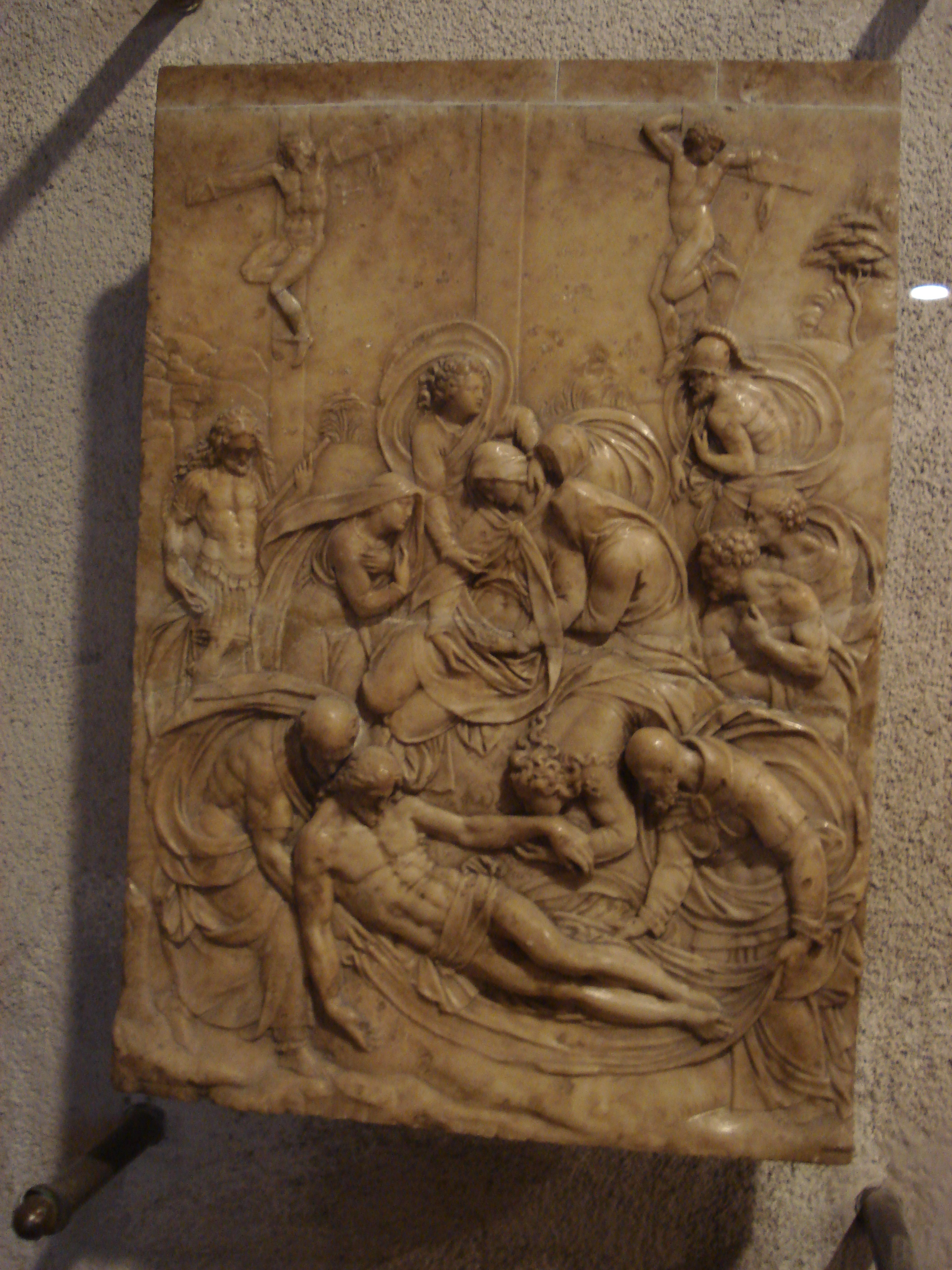
Bas-relief of Descent from the Cross, now in Castello Sforzesco

Guglielmo della Porta (c. 1500–1577) was an Italian architect and sculptor of the late Renaissance or Mannerist period.

He was born to a prominent North Italian family of masons, sculptors and architects. His father Giovanni Battista della Porta was a sculptor. He trained in his uncle's workshop in Genoa and moved to Rome in about 1537, where he was very much influenced by Michelangelo. Della Porta provided legs for the Farnese Hercules when it was first excavated; when the original legs were found some years later, Michelangelo recommended that Della Porta's legs be retained, showing how modern artists were capable of direct comparison with the Ancients. He was appointed to the papal mint in 1547. His prolific output is varied. He began his artistic training under the guidance of his uncle Giovanni Giacomo, who takes him on his construction site of the Cathedral of Milan and assigned him the task of sculpturing and reinterpreting the works of Leonardo da Vinci until about 1530. Later he moved with his uncle to Genoa where he perfected his design under the guidance of the painter Perin del Vaga in the works for Villa del Principe, Palazzo di Andrea Doria.

== Major works ==
- Genoa Cathedral, Chapel of Peter and Paul. Main altar, 1534-37. A triumphal arch motif that fills one end of the chapel, with a central niche containing a seated Christ flanked by the two apostles.
- Tomb of Odoardo Cicada, ca. 1545; originally a Late Renaissance wall tomb in Michelangelo's style in the Cicada Chapel of the Basilica of Santa Maria del Popolo, Rome; now fragmented.
- Bust of Pope Paul III, ca. 1547; white and yellow marble (Museum of Capodimonte, Naples) One of a number of busts of the Farnese pope.
- Tomb of Paul III, bronze and marble, Saint Peter's Basilica, Rome, 1549-75. Della Porta's signal work, the tomb was shifted and modified by Bernini.

== Bibliography ==
- Giovanni Baglione, Le Vite de' Pittori, Scultori et Architetti dal Pontificato di Gregorio XIII fino a tutto quello d'Urbano VIII, Roma 1642, 70–71, 143, 169, 211, 307.
- Filippo Titi, Descrizione delle Pitture, Sculture e Architetture esposte in Roma, Marco Pagliarini, Roma 1674, rivista da Giovanni Bottari 1763, 15, 19, 111, 265.
- S. Varni, Delle opere di Gian Giacomo, di Guglielmo Della Porta e di Nicolò Da Corte Scultori, in Atti della Società Ligure di Storia patria, VII, Genova 1866.
- Giorgio Vasari, Vite: Vita di Guglielmo Della Porta, di Michelangelo, di Leone Leoni e di Pierin del Vaga, VII, Milano 1880.
- Giuseppe Merzario, I Maestri Comacini. Storia artistica di mille duecento anni (600–1800), I–II, G. Agnelli, Milano 1893.
- Ernesto Steinmann, Monumento a Paolo II a S. Pietro, Roma 1912.
- Angelo Borzelli, Il capolavoro di Guglielmo Della Porta: la tomba di Paolo III in S. Pietro in Vaticano, Napoli 1920.
- Guglielmo Matthiae, Attività romana di Guglielmo Della Porta, in Capitolium, 7, 1935, 313–326.
- Ugo Donati, Vagabondaggi. Contributi alla storiografia artistica ticinese, I, Arturo Salvioni & Co. Editori, Bellinzona 1939, 33.
- Maria Gibellino Krasceninnicowa, Guglielmo Della Porta. Scultore lombardo, Fratelli Palombi Editori, Roma, 1944, 67, 72.
- Alessandro Giobbi, Testimonianze di Storia di Claino con Osteno, Osteno 1971.
- Clario Di Fabio, Il "mito delle origini" e il nome di Genova nel Medioevo, in Bollettino Ligustico, XXXI, 1979 (ma 1981), 1/4, 37–44.
- AA.VV., Dizionario biografico degli italiani, ad vocem, Istituto dell'Enciclopedia italiana, Roma.
- AA.VV., La scultura a Genova e in Liguria, 1, 1987.
- Idem, La scultura bronzea a Genova nel Medioevo e il programma decorativo della Cattedrale nel primo Trecento, in Bollettino d’Arte, s. VI, LXXVI, 1989, 55, 1–44.
- Elena Parma Armani, Precisazioni sull’attività grafica di Guglielmo della Porta nel periodo genovese e nel primo momento romano, in Le vie del marmo. Aspetti della produzione e della diffusione dei manufatti marmorei tra Quattrocento e Cinquecento, atti del colloquio (Pietrasanta) a cura di R.P. Ciardi e S. Russo, Firenze 1994, 45–52.
- Clario Di Fabio, Davide vincitore, in Amici dei Musei, 1995, 62/63, 34–35; Idem, La Cattedrale di Genova nel Medioevo (secoli VI–XIV), Cinisello Balsamo 1998.
- Alverio Gualandris, Porlezza. Storia – Arte – Statuti – Artisti – Documenti, Attilio Sampietro Editore, Menaggio 2003, 170–172, 178.
- Riccardo Navone, Viaggio nei Caruggi, edicole votive, pietre e portali, Fratelli Frilli Editori, Genova 2007, 473.
- Yasmine Helfer, Guglielmo della Porta: dal Duomo di Genova al Duomo di Milano, in «Prospettiva», 132, 2008, 61–77.
