= Giovanni Piancastelli =

Italian painter (1845–1926)

- Born: September 14, 1845; Castel Bolognese, Italy
- Died: September 23, 1926 (aged 81); Bologna, Italy
- Occupations: Painter, architect

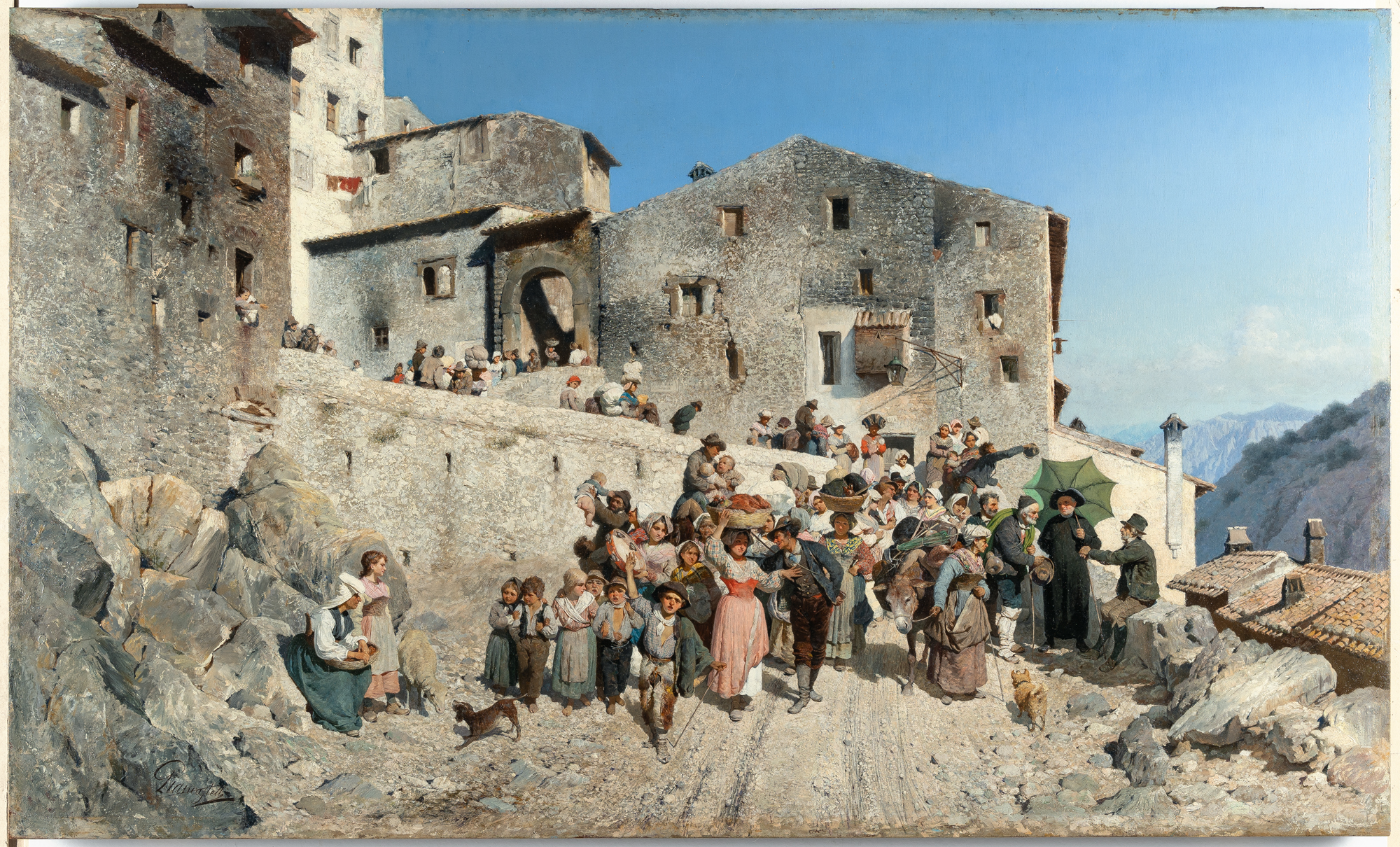
The Roman Countryside Emigration – Departing

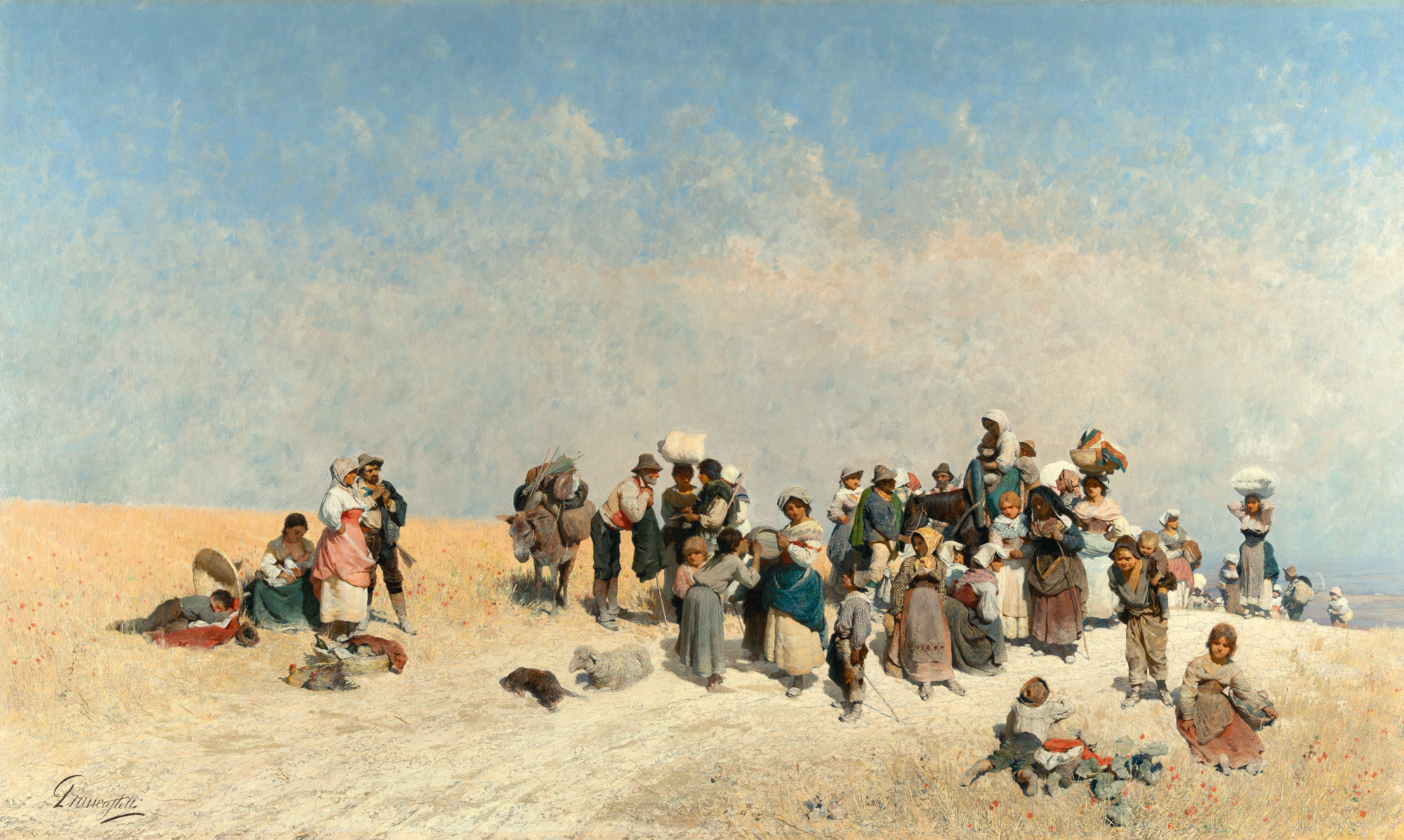
The Roman Countryside Emigration – Returning

Giovanni Piancastelli (September 14, 1845 – September 23, 1926) was an Italian painter and architect.

== Biography ==
He was born to a family of little resources in Castel Bolognese. His initial lessons were under a Cappucini priest at a local convent. By virtue of the patronage of Counts Giuseppe Rossi and Domenico Zauli Naldi, by 1860, he had enrolled at the Scuola di Disegno in Faenza, where his teacher was Achille Farina. In 1862, through the patronage of Duke Camillo Zacchia, he then traveled to Rome where he apprenticed under Guido Guidi. By 1864, he enrolled in the Accademia di San Luca, where he had among teachers: Francesco Podesti, Alessandro Capalti, Vincenzo Pasqualoni, Annibale Angelini, Francesco Coghetti, and Antonio Sarti.

He painted Genre painting and landscapes early in his career, while later he was employed in painting portraits and religious designs. Among his works are Campagna Romana; Emigrazione dall'Agro Romano ("Roman Countryside Emigration", displayed at the 1878 Paris Universal Exposition); Marina; Spiaggia al Tramonto; and the Moglie del Marinaio (Sailor's Wife exhibited at Turin). At Bologna in 1888, he exhibited a painting on wood entitled Atropo and a water color titled Charitas.

In 1866-1872, he enlisted in the infantry, serving in Siena in 1871, where he met Luigi Mussini. After his service, he is hired by Prince Marcantonio Borghese as a teacher of design and painting. In 1886, he was entrusted with reorganizing and transferring the dispersed Borghese collections, including works at the Villa Costaguti-Borghese at Nettuno to Villa Borghese on Pincian Hill. He became director of the Galleria Borghese in 1902.

In 1865, he won an architectural competition held by the Congregation of the Virtuosi. In 1875, he was awarded two silver medals at Faenza's Esposizione Romagnola. In 1889, he was named Academic of Honor by the Bolognese Royal Academy of Fine Arts. He painted La morte di San Giovanni Nepomuceno (Death of Saint John of Nepomuk) for Prince Giulio Torlonia in 1894. In 1896, the art critic Corrado Ricci commissioned from Piancastelli several drawings for the story of Il Passo della Badessa (The Passage of Badessa), published in the magazine "Emporium".

He became the curator of the Borghese art collection and aided Adolfo Venturi in completing his catalogue of the works in 1893. In 1902, when he was director, the Italian state acquired the villa and collections. He resigned in 1906 to live in Bologna. In 1906, he was nominated to become a Knight of the Order of Saints Maurice and Lazarus.

He died at Bologna in 1926.
