= Angelo Gottarelli =

Italian painter (1740–1813)

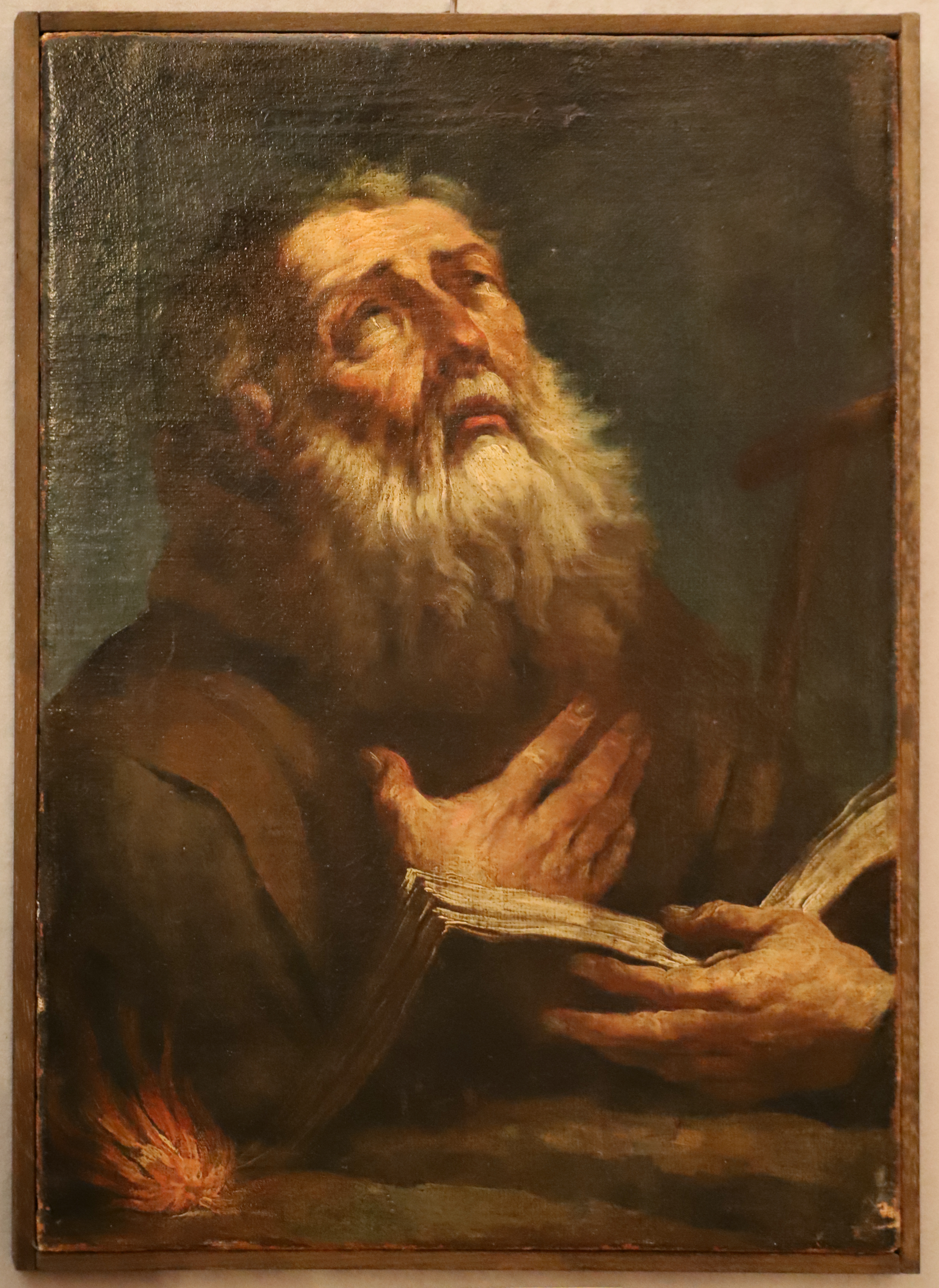

Angelo Gotarelli (1740–1813) was an Italian painter, active near Imola and in the Papal States.

He was born in Castel Bolognese, and as a young man entered a seminary in Imola. He abandoned the religious vocation, to study art under Andrea Valeriani. He then moved in 1763–1765 to study under Vittorio Maria Bigari at the Accademia Clementina in Bologna. He was awarded prizes for his work there.

He returned to Imola where he taught painting. His son Giuseppe was also a painter. Angelo collaborated with Alessandro Dalla Nave and Antonio Villa in many project decorations. Most of his paintings are found in churches of Imola, Castel Bolognese, Medicina and the surrounding area.
