= Santa Maria della Pace, Castelbolognese =

Church building in Castel Bolognese, Italy

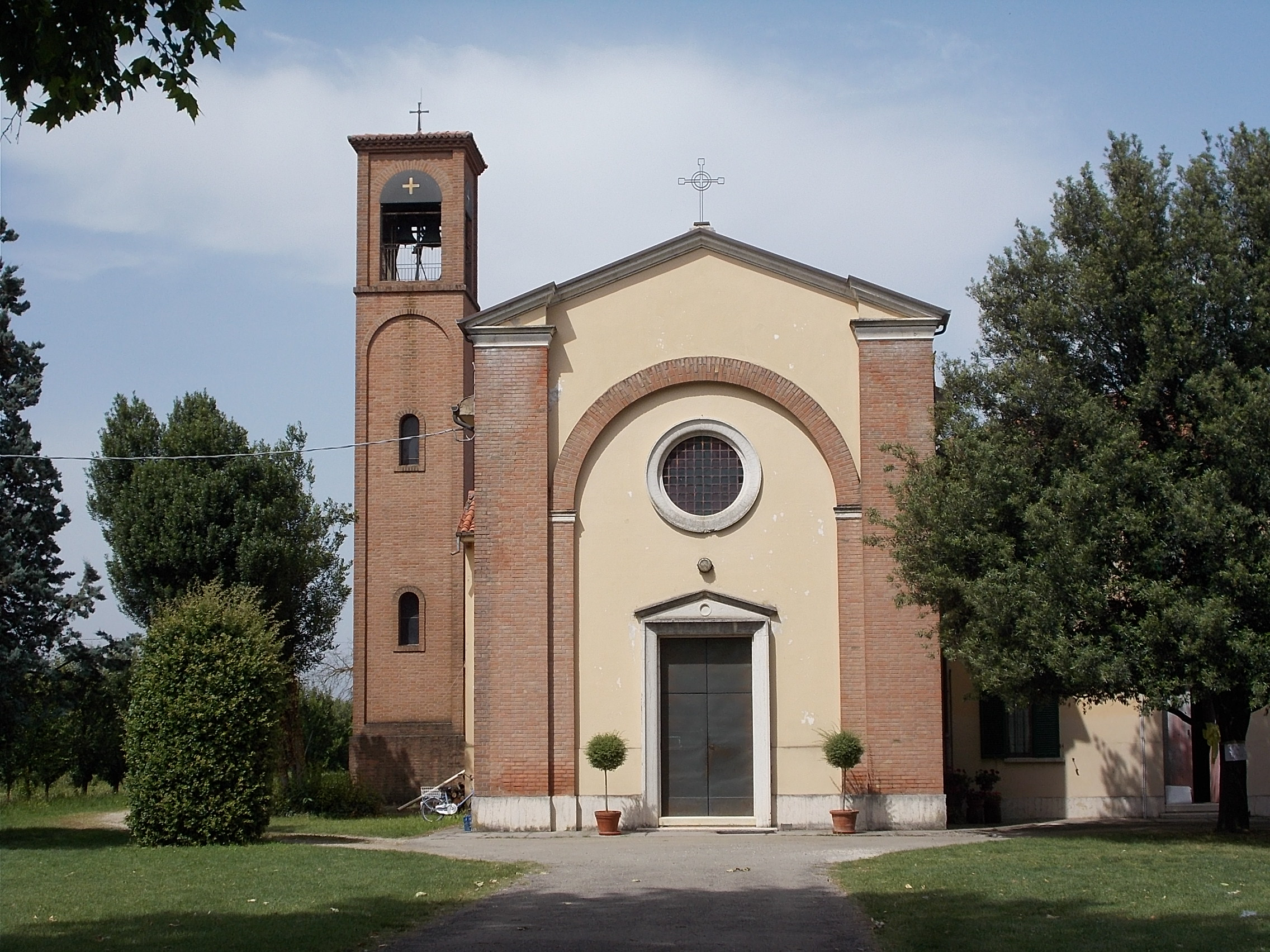

Santa Maria della Pace is a Roman Catholic church located on Via Emilia Levante #1300 in the town of Castelbolognese, in the region of Emilia Romagna, Italy.

== History ==
A church at the site was first built in 1171 to celebrate peace between the town and Bologna. In 1501, the church was assigned to the Camaldolese order. A flood of the River Senio in the late 1940s destroyed that church, and it was reconstituted after 1950. In 1983, it underwent a reconstruction in a modern style that recalls the Romanesque origins. The interiors have a fresco from the 16th century, and a 15th-century tabernacle. A marble plaque near the entrance recounts the founding of the church.
