= Santa Maria della Pace e Santa Rita, Benevento =

Roman Catholic parish church in Benevento, Campania, Italy

Santa Maria della Pace e Santa Rita is a Roman Catholic parish church located in piazza Federico Torre, along corso Garibaldi, in Benevento, region of Campania, Italy.

== History ==
The Augustinian order, which for centuries had officiated the church of Sant'Agostino in Benevento, was suppressed in Campania in 1860. The order returned in 1935 to officiate at the church of the Annunziata (which also was dedicated to Santa Rita), canonized in 1900. The order also ran an adjacent orphanage until 1980s.

With the support of the Archbishop Monsignor Carlo Minchiatti, they decided to form a new parish in the neighborhood of Pace Vecchia, with the aim of forming a sanctuary dedicated to Santa Rita. In 1996, they contracted with IACP, to build the present modern church, the architect was Benedetto Aloia. The church was consecrated in 2003. The building is postmodern with a tall iron façade, and flanked by two low slung tower chapels.
