= San Francesco, Castel Bolognese =

Roman Catholic church in Castelbolognese, Italy

Coordinates: 44.319554°N 11.799376°E

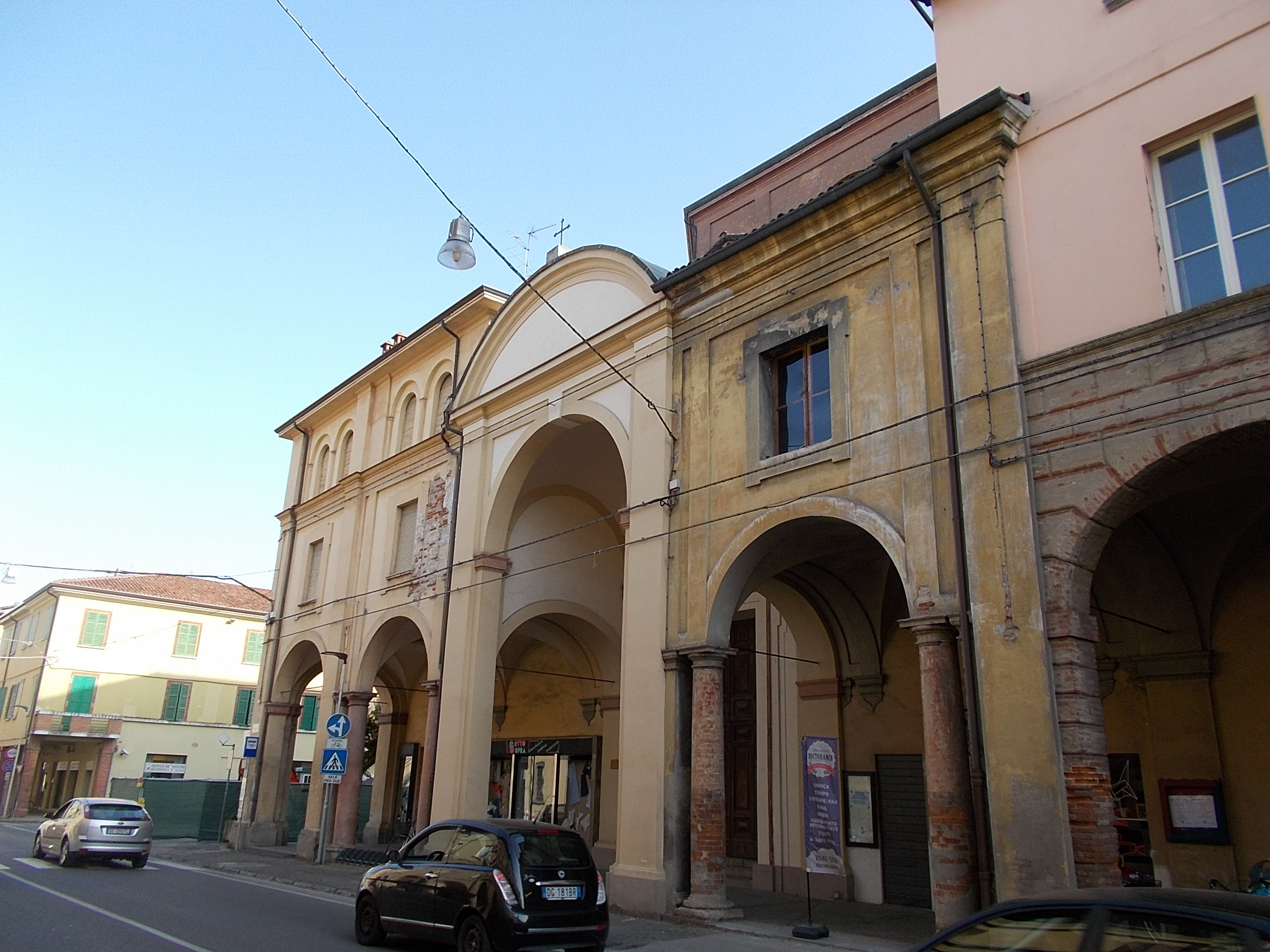

San Francesco is a Roman Catholic church located on Via Emilia in the town of Castelbolognese, in the region of Emilia Romagna, Italy.

== History ==
A church at the site, along with Franciscan convent, was first built in 1422, and dedicated to St Lucy (Lucia of Syracuse). The present church was designed and built in 1702 by Francesco Fontana. It survived the earthquake of 1781, but the cupola fell with the earthquake of 1854.

The monastery was suppressed by Napoleonic governments, and the convent became state property. In 1866, the church underwent restorations. The church suffered severe damage during the Second World War, destroying the bell-tower and the sacristy, and was only reopened to the public in 1965.

The first chapel to the right is dedicated to Blessed Crucifix, and houses a 15th-century painted crucifix. At the end of the transept is the Chapel of the Immaculate Conception, with a monumental altarpiece containing a sculpture of the Madonna attributed to the school of Jacopo della Quercia.

The main chapel still has its original altarpiece, but the altar is a modern, completed by Domenico Matteucci, with a painting by Ferraù Tenzoni. The left transept chapel is a treasury of hundreds of sacred relics. The last chapel in the church once dedicated to San Giuseppe da Copertino, but now dedicated to the Sacred Heart of Jesus, houses a painting depicting the Patron Saints of Castel Bolognese (1607) by the son of Giovanni Battista Bertucci. The church has a terracotta statue of the Virgin, venerated as the protector of the town.

The adjacent convent now houses the City Hall.
