= Castel Bolognese =

- Comune
- Comune di Castel Bolognese
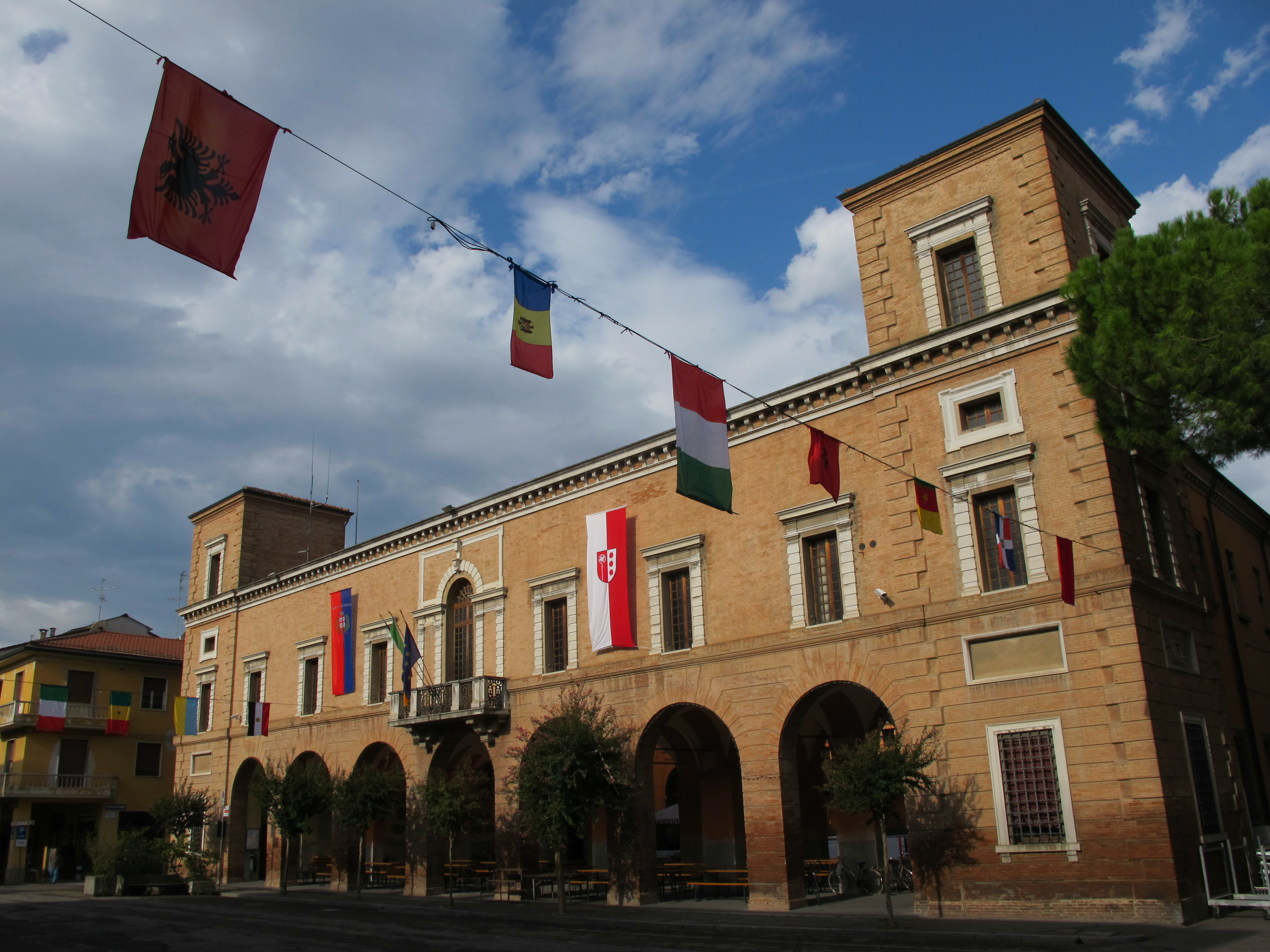

- Coat of arms

- Location within Italy Location within Emilia-Romagna
- Coordinates: 44°19′N 11°48′E
- Country: Italy
- Region: Emilia-Romagna
- Province: Ravenna (RA)
- Frazioni: Biancanigo, Borello, Campiano, Casalecchio, Pace, Serra

Area
  - Total: 32.3 km^{2} (12.5 sq mi)
- Elevation: 32 m (105 ft)

Population (31 December 2024)
  - Total: 9,507
  - Density: 294/km^{2} (762/sq mi)
- Demonym: Castellani
- Time zone: UTC+1 (CET)
  - Summer (DST): UTC+2 (CEST)
- Postal code: 48014
- Dialing code: 0546
- Patron saint: St. Petronio
- Saint day: Monday of Pentecost
- Website: Official website

Castel Bolognese (Romagnol: Castël Bulgnés) is a comune (municipality) in the Province of Ravenna in the Italian region Emilia-Romagna, located about 40 kilometres (25 mi) southeast of Bologna and about 35 kilometres (22 mi) southwest of Ravenna. As of 2006, it has a population of about 9,000 inhabitants.

Castel Bolognese borders the following municipalities: Faenza, Imola, Riolo Terme, Solarolo.

== Main sights ==
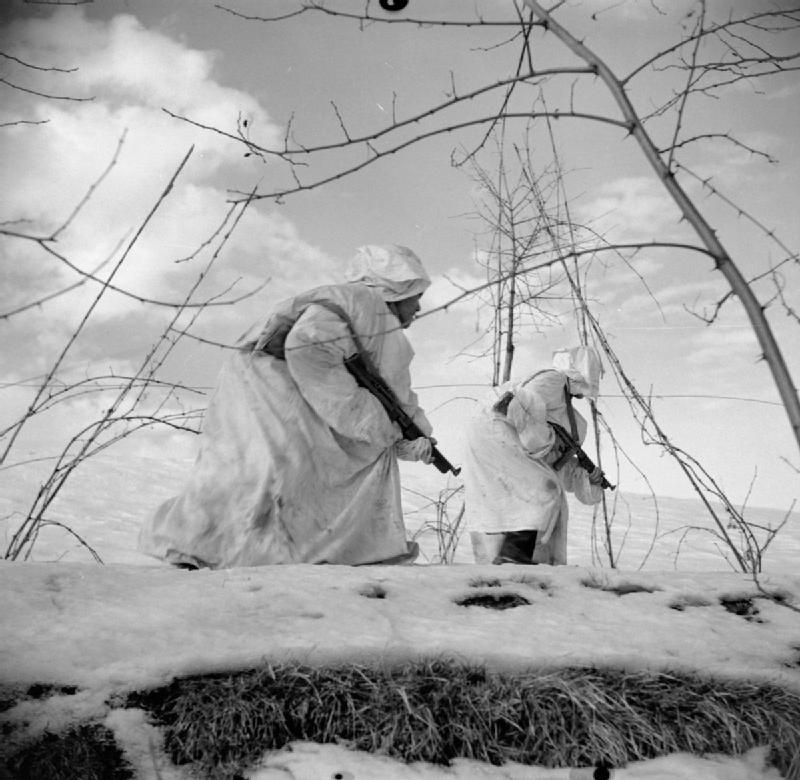
The British Army in Italy 1945 NA21748

- The Castle, built from 1389. It was destroyed in 1501 by duke Cesare Borgia, together with the walls. The latter were rebuilt by the Papal forces in 1504. Of the castle, today parts of the walls and a tower survive.
- Civic Museum
- Biblioteca Libertaria Armando Borghi
- Church of San Sebastiano (1506).
- Church of San Francesco (18th century), including a statue attributed to Jacopo della Quercia, a 15th-century wooden crucifix and paintings by Giovan Battista Bertucci il Giovane and Ferraù Fenzoni.
- Church of San Pietro Apostolo
- Church of San Petronio
- Church of Santa Maria della Pace

== Transport ==
=== Rail ===
The railway station is called Castel Bolognese–Riolo Terme. It is on the railway line connecting Bologna to Ancona.

=== Roads ===
Castel Bolognese can be reached through the A14 motorway which is the Italian part of the E45 European Route, by taking the exit Imola (coming from the North) or Faenza (coming from the South).

== Demographic evolution ==
Historical population

Year	Pop.	±%
1861	5,235	—
1871	5,695	+8.8%
1881	5,737	+0.7%
1901	5,741	+0.1%
1911	5,756	+0.3%

Year	Pop.	±%
1921	5,905	+2.6%
1931	5,999	+1.6%
1936	5,995	−0.1%
1951	5,913	−1.4%
1961	6,362	+7.6%

Year	Pop.	±%
1971	6,799	+6.9%
1981	7,716	+13.5%
1991	7,891	+2.3%
2001	8,212	+4.1%

Source: Data from ISTAT

== Twin towns ==
- Abtsgmünd, Germany
