= Violet Town railway station =

Railway station in Victoria, Australia

Violet Town
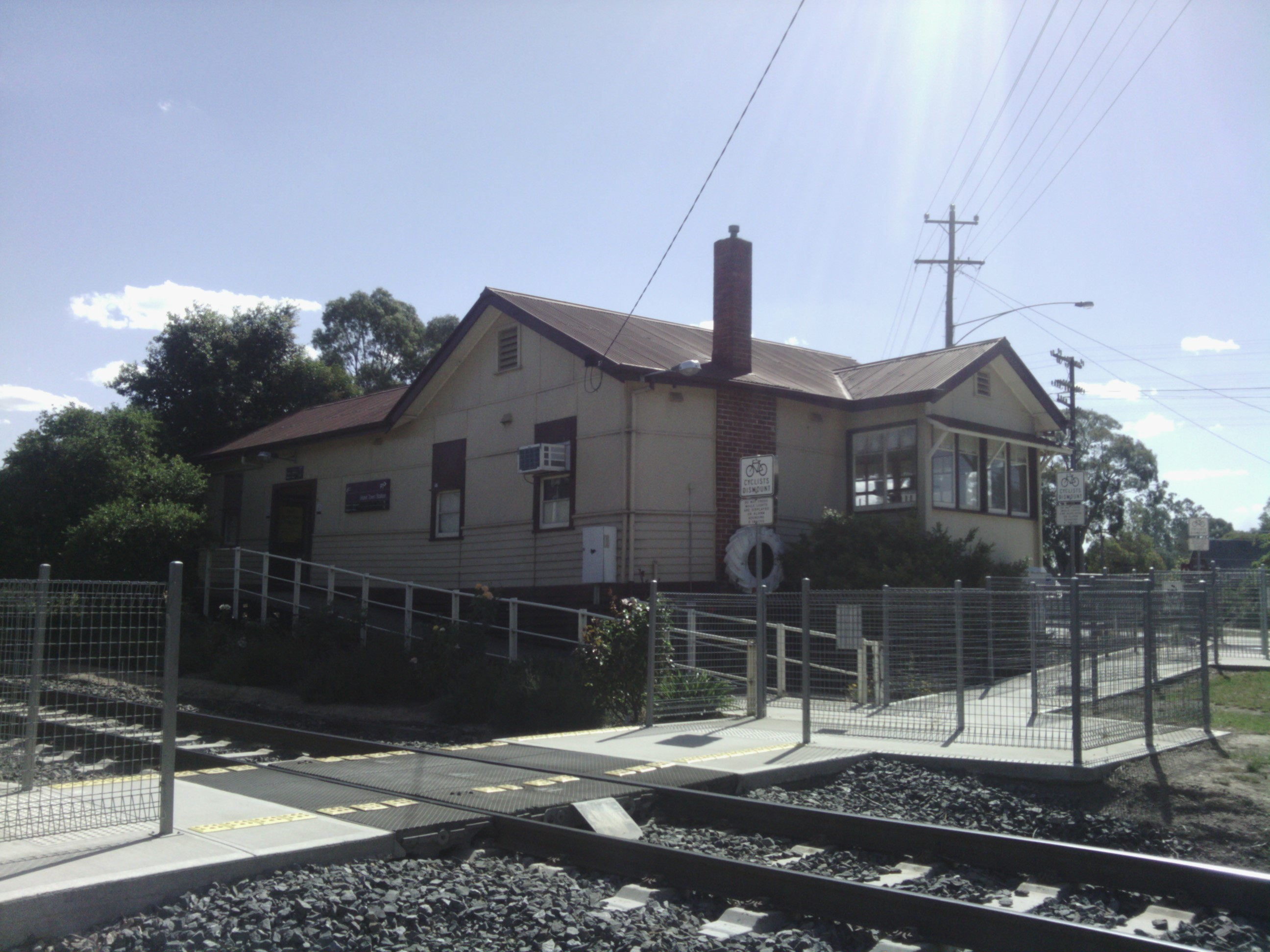
- Westbound view of the station building, March 2015

General information
- Location: Primrose Street, Violet Town, Victoria 3669; Shire of Strathbogie; Australia
- Coordinates: 36°38′16″S 145°43′08″E
- System: PTV regional rail station
- Owner: VicTrack
- Operator: V/Line
- Line: Albury (North East)
- Distance: 169.33 kilometres from Southern Cross
- Platforms: 2 side
- Tracks: 2

Construction
- Structure type: Ground
- Parking: Yes
- Cycle facilities: Yes
- Accessible: Yes

Other information
- Status: Operational, unstaffed
- Station code: VTN
- Fare zone: Myki zone 12/13
- Website: Public Transport Victoria

History
- Opened: 20 March 1873; 153 years ago
- Rebuilt: 2009; 17 years ago

Services
Preceding station	V/Line	Following station
Euroa towards Southern Cross	Albury line	Benalla towards Albury
Location
- Location within Victoria

Violet Town railway station is a regional railway station on the North East line. It serves the town of Violet Town, in Victoria, Australia. Violet Town is a ground level unstaffed station, featuring two side platforms. It opened on 20 March 1873, with the current station provided in 2009.

The station opened as the temporary terminus of the line from Longwood, before it was extended to Benalla on 18 August 1873.

== History ==
The station opened with the line in 1873, and was an important railhead before the opening of the Goulburn Valley line to the west. A temporary building was initially provided, and was replaced in 1876 by a weatherboard structure. The goods shed that was provided with the opening of the line was still in use in the 1970s.

In 1909, the goods yard was extended, and a new signal box provided, with the main line slewed to run through the platform, instead of No. 2 road as previously. In 1938, the yard was again altered, and the station building was moved to its current position, at the northern end of the platform.

Boom barriers replaced interlocked gates at the Cowslip Street level crossing, located at the Albury (down) end of the station, in 1961.

On 7 February 1969, the Violet Town rail accident occurred one kilometre south of the station, when the southbound Southern Aurora passenger train collided head on with a northbound freight train.

In 1979, a road leading to a former crane at the station was abolished.

On 5 January 1994, a number of track and signal alterations took place, including the abolition of No. 3 road, sidings "A" and "B", and a number of disc signals and points.

In 1999, the former crossing loop on the standard gauge line was extended at the down end.

As part of the North East Rail Revitalisation Project, a second platform was constructed on the 1960s built standard gauge line, in conjunction with the standard gauge conversion of the existing broad gauge track. Work began in December 2008, and was completed in late 2009.

Former station Balmattum was located between Violet Town and Euroa, while Baddaginnie was located between Violet Town and Benalla.

== Platforms and services ==
Violet Town has two side platforms. It is serviced by V/Line Albury line services.

Violet Town platform arrangement
Platform	Line	Destination
1	Albury line	Southern Cross
2	Albury line	Albury
