= Euroa railway station =

Railway station in Victoria, Australia

Euroa
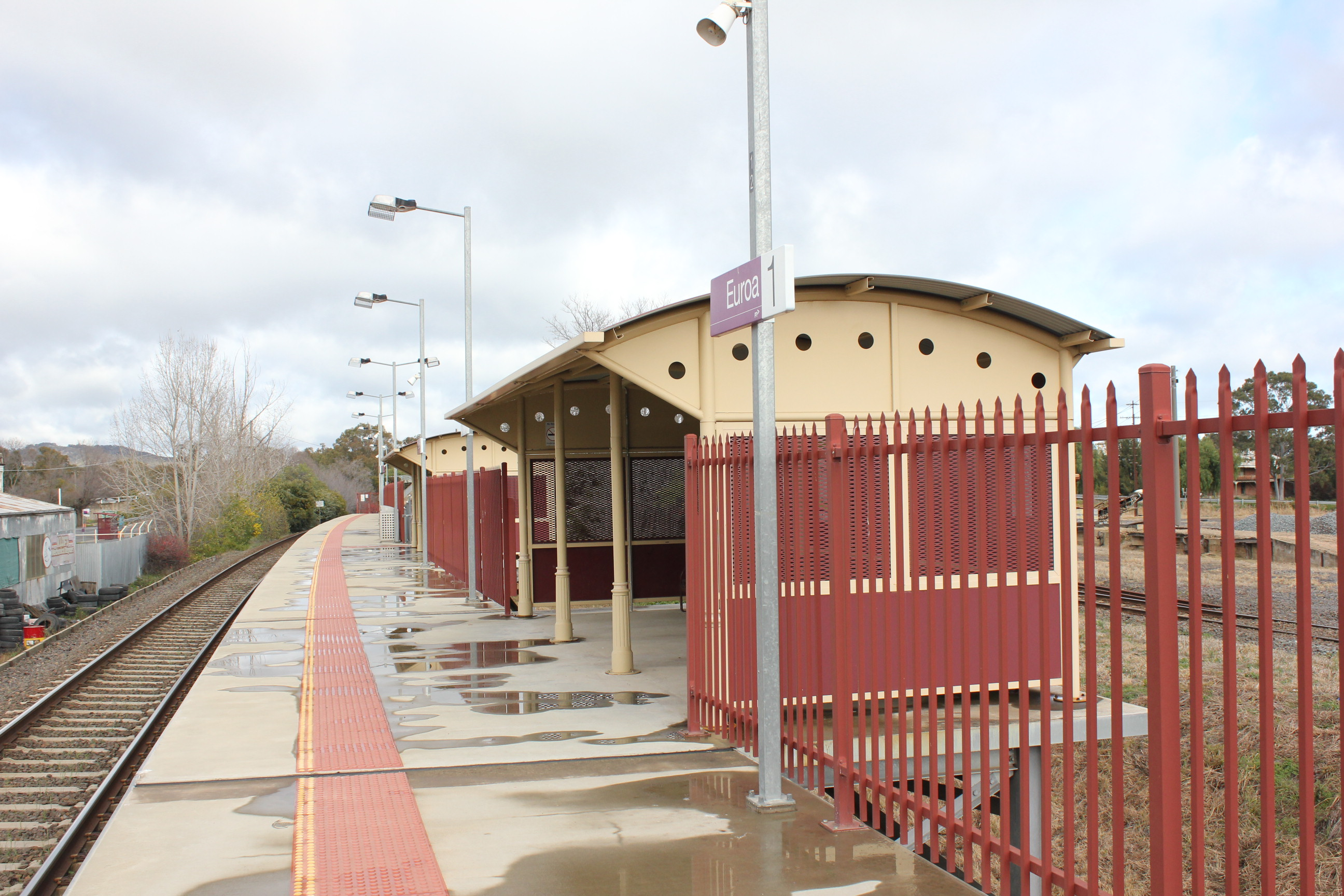
- Southbound view from Platform 1, July 2018

General information
- Location: Railway Street, Euroa, Victoria 3666; Shire of Strathbogie; Australia
- Coordinates: 36°44′57″S 145°34′05″E
- System: PTV regional rail station
- Owner: VicTrack
- Operator: V/Line
- Line: Albury (North East)
- Distance: 151.03 kilometres from Southern Cross
- Platforms: 2 side
- Tracks: 2
- Connections: Bus; Coach

Construction
- Structure type: Ground
- Parking: 40
- Cycle facilities: Yes
- Accessible: Yes

Other information
- Status: Operational, unstaffed
- Station code: EOA
- Fare zone: Myki zone 11
- Website: Public Transport Victoria

History
- Opened: 20 March 1873; 153 years ago
- Rebuilt: 2009; 17 years ago

Services
Preceding station	V/Line	Following station
Avenel towards Southern Cross	Albury line	Violet Town towards Albury
Location
- Location within Victoria

Euroa railway station is a regional railway station on the North East line. It serves the town of Euroa, in Victoria, Australia. Euroa is a ground level unstaffed station, featuring two side platforms, it opened on 20 March 1873, with the current station provided in 2009.

== History ==
Euroa station was opened with the line, and the first permanent station building was erected in 1878. The platform was initially 300 feet (91 m) long, and was extended to 400 feet (120 m) in 1900. A second platform, 300-foot (91 m)-long, once existed at Euroa, against the goods shed wall. It was in use between 1880 and 1904, and permitted the crossing of two passenger trains. An iron footbridge linked the two platforms between 1900 and 1904.

The first lever frame for signals was provided in 1885, and was made part of the station building in 1929. The track layout was altered in 1931, remaining in that state until the 1970s, when it was rationalised. Two pedestrian subways, as well as the road overpass at Anderson Street to the south, were provided as part of the construction of the Albury–Melbourne standard gauge line in 1960.

As part of the North East Rail Revitalisation Project, a second platform was constructed on the existing standard gauge line, in conjunction with the standard gauge conversion of the broad gauge track. Work began in December 2008, and was completed in late 2009.

As part of the Inland Rail project, the station is reconstructed to support double-stacked freight trains. Changes involve replacing the Anderson Street bridge with a vehicle underpass, relocating the eastern railway track to a new western track, a new western platform, and the construction of a new pedestrian underpass, station forecourt and car park. Construction commenced in March 2025 and is ongoing.

Now-closed stations at Creighton, Longwood, Locksley and Monea were located between Euroa and Avenel, while the former Balmattum station was located between Euroa and Violet Town.

== Platforms and services ==
Euroa has two side platforms and is served by V/Line Albury line trains.

Euroa platform arrangement
Platform	Line	Destination
1	Albury line	Southern Cross
2	Albury line	Albury

== Transport links ==
Benalla Bus Lines operates one route to and from Euroa station, under contract to Public Transport Victoria:

- to Shepparton

V/Line operates one road coach service via Euroa station:

- Seymour station – Albury station

== Gallery ==
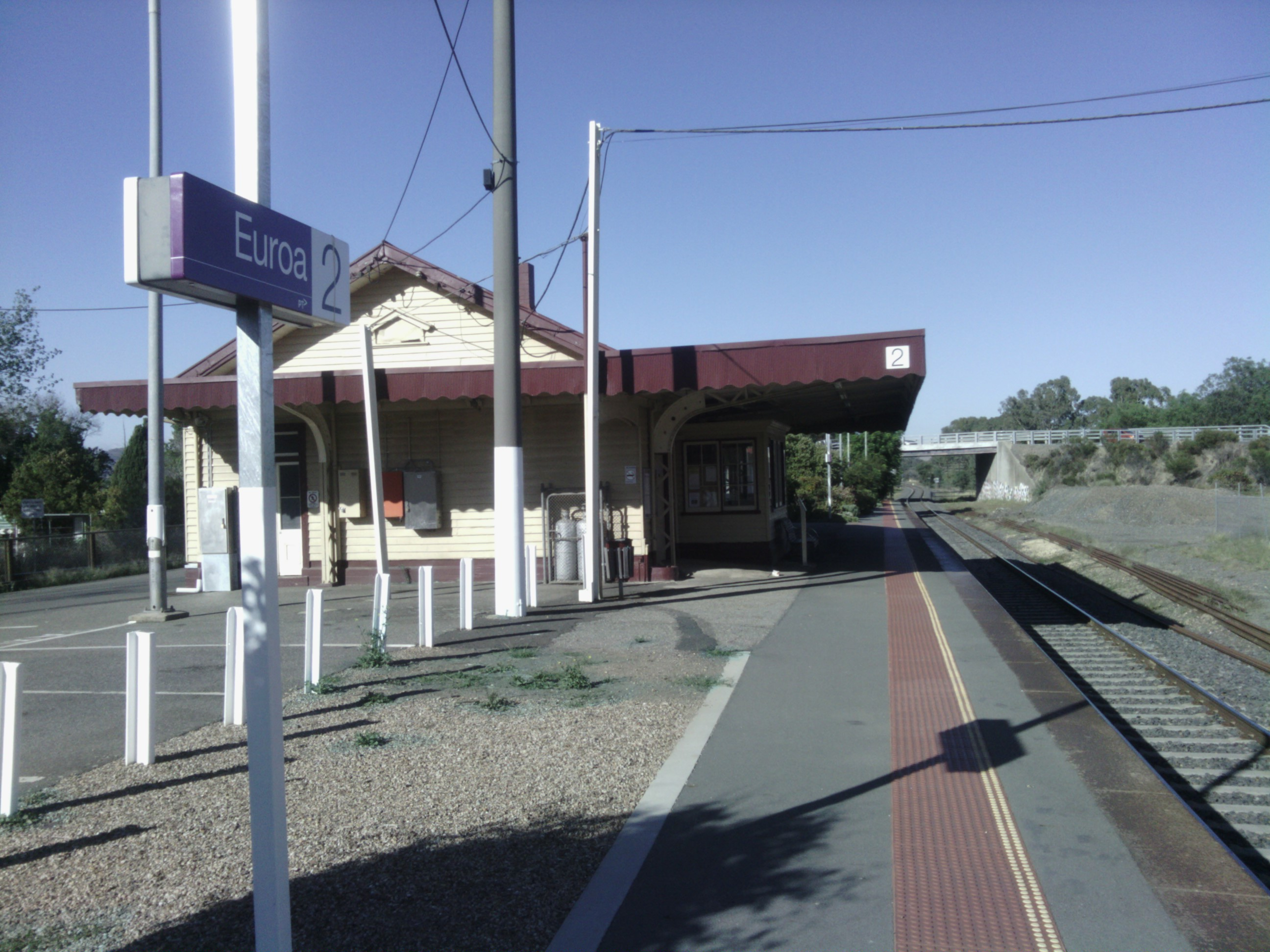
Southbound view of the Platform 2 station building, March 2015
