= Albury line (disambiguation) =

Albury line is a regional passenger rail service operated by V/Line in Victoria, Australia.

Albury line may also refer to:

- Main Southern railway line, New South Wales, Australia
- North East railway line in Victoria, Australia
