= North East railway line =

Railway line in Victoria, Australia

North East (SG)

Overview
- Status: Operational passenger services from Southern Cross to Albury and Sydney
- Owner: Victorian Railways (VR) (1959–1974); VR as VicRail (1974–1983); STA (V/Line) (1983–1989); PTC (V/Line) (1989–1995); PTC (V/Line Passenger) (1995–1997); VicTrack (1997–Current)
- Locale: Victoria, Australia
- Termini: Southern Cross; Albury
- Connecting lines: Albion–Jacana; Main Southern (NSW); Newport–Sunshine; Oaklands; South Kensington–West Footscray; Western standard gauge
- Former connections: Upfield—Somerton link
- Stations: 6 current stations

Service
- Type: Victorian railway line
- Services: Albury Southern; Spirit of Progress, Southern Aurora, Sydney–Melbourne Express, Intercapital Daylight; Shared tracks: South Kensington–West Footscray, Albion–Jacana, Albury
- Operators: Victorian Railways (VR) (1962–1974); Department of Railways New South Wales (1962–1972); Public Transport Commission (NSW) (1972–1980); VR as VicRail (1974–1983); State Rail Authority (NSW) (1980–1989); STA (V/Line) (1983–1989); PTC (V/Line) (1989–1995); CountryLink (1989–2013); PTC (V/Line Passenger) (1995–1998); V/Line Passenger (1998–2010); V/Line (2010–Current); NSW TrainLink (2013–Current)

History
- Work began: November 1959
- Opened: Southern Cross to Albury on 3 January 1962
- Completed: 3 January 1962
- Reopened: New Wodonga section on 23 July 2010
- Closed: Old Wodonga section on 9 November 2008

Technical
- Num of tracks: Double track: Southern Cross to Tottenham; Seymour to border; Single track: Tottenham to Seymour; border to Albury
- Track gauge: 4 ft 8 1/2 in (1,435 mm)

North East (original BG line)

Overview
- Other name: Albury
- Status: Operational with broad gauge passenger services from Flinders Street to Seymour; Gauge converted beyond Seymour
- Owner: M&ER (1860–1964); Victorian Railways (VR) (1867–1974); VR as VicRail (1974–1983); MTA (The Met) (1983–1989); STA (V/Line) (1983–1989); PTC (The Met) (1989–1997); PTC (V/Line) (1989–1995); PTC (V/Line Passenger) (1995–1997); VicTrack (1997–Current)
- Locale: Victoria, Australia
- Termini: Southern Cross; Albury
- Connecting lines: All metropolitan, regional, and interstate; Albion–Jacana; Oaklands; Tocumwal
- Former connections: Bright; Cudgewa; Heathcote; Mansfield; Peechelba East; Tatong; Upfield—Somerton link; Wahgunyah; Whitfield
- Stations: 38 current stations; 13 former stations; 2 current siding; 13 former sidings

Service
- Type: Victorian railway line
- Services: Albury Craigieburn Seymour Shepparton
- Operators: M&ER (1860–1964); Victorian Railways (VR) (1867–1974); VR as VicRail (1974–1983); MTA (The Met) (1983–1989); STA (V/Line) (1983–1989); PTC (The Met) (1989–1998); PTC (V/Line) (1989–1995); PTC (V/Line Passenger) (1995–1998); Bayside Trains (1998–2000); V/Line Passenger (1998–2010); M>Train (2000–2004); Connex Melbourne (2004–2009); Metro Trains (2009–Current); V/Line (2010–Current)

History
- Work began: 21 October 1860
- Opened: Southern Cross to North Melbourne on 17 January 1859; North Melbourne to Essendon on 21 October 1860; Essendon to Dysart on 18 April 1872; Dysart to Seymour on 26 August 1872; Seymour to Longwood on 20 November 1872; Longwood to Violet Town on 20 March 1873; Violet Town to Benalla on 18 August 1873; Benalla to Wangaratta on 28 October 1873; Wangaratta to Wodonga on 21 November 1873; Wodonga to Albury on 14 June 1883; Flinders Street to Southern Cross on 29 November 1891
- Completed: 14 June 1883
- Reopened: North Melbourne to Newmarket on 31 October 1867; Newmarket to Essendon on 9 January 1871
- Electrified: Flinders Street to Essendon on 28 May 1919; Essendon to Broadmeadows on 4 September 1921; Broadmeadows to Craigieburn on 22 July 2007
- Gauge converted: Seymour to Albury on 23 July 2010
- Closed: North Melbourne to Essendon on 1 July 1864; Seymour to Albury on 9 November 2008

Technical
- Line length: 307.812 km (191.27 mi)
- Num of tracks: Broad gauge: Six tracks: Flinders Street to North Melbourne; Four tracks: North Melbourne to Kensington; Double track: Kensington to Dysart; Single track: Dysart to Seymour; Standard gauge Double track: Seymour to border; Single track: Broadmeadows to Seymour; border to Albury
- Track gauge: 5 ft 3 in (1,600 mm); 4 ft 8 1/2 in (1,435 mm)
- Electrification: Flinders Street to Craigieburn: 1500 V DC overhead
- Operating speed: 130 km/h (81 mph) – Passenger; 115 km/h (71 mph) – Freight
- Signalling: BG to Craigieburn: Automatic block signalling; BG to Seymour: Double Line Block; SG to Albury: Centralised Traffic Control
- Maximum incline: 1 in 50 (2%)

The North East railway line is a railway line in Victoria, Australia. The line runs from Southern Cross railway station on the western edge of the Melbourne central business district to Albury railway station in the border settlement of Albury-Wodonga, serving the cities of Wangaratta and Seymour, and smaller towns in northeastern Victoria.

The railway line is both standard gauge and broad gauge. It originally was built as broad gauge the entire length, but another track was built as standard gauge between Seymour and Albury, with construction of the standard gauge track commencing in November 1959 and completed in January 1962, completing the Sydney-Melbourne standard gauge railway. Between 2008 and 2010, the broad gauge track between Seymour and Albury was finally converted to be the line's second standard gauge track. The original section between Southern Cross and Jacana remains broad gauge, with the standard gauge joining and running parallel to the broad gauge between Jacana and Seymour, where the broad gauge branches off on the Tocumwal line, and finally continuing as standard gauge all the way to Albury.

The line is owned by VicTrack, but the standard gauge sections are leased to and maintained by the Australian Rail Track Corporation.

== History ==
=== Broad gauge via Essendon ===
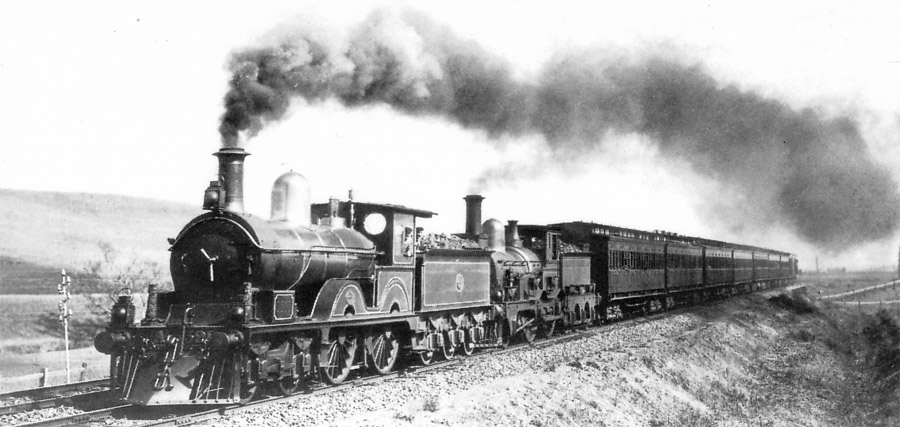
New A 398 leads a B class up Glenroy Bank on the Sydney Express, circa 1900

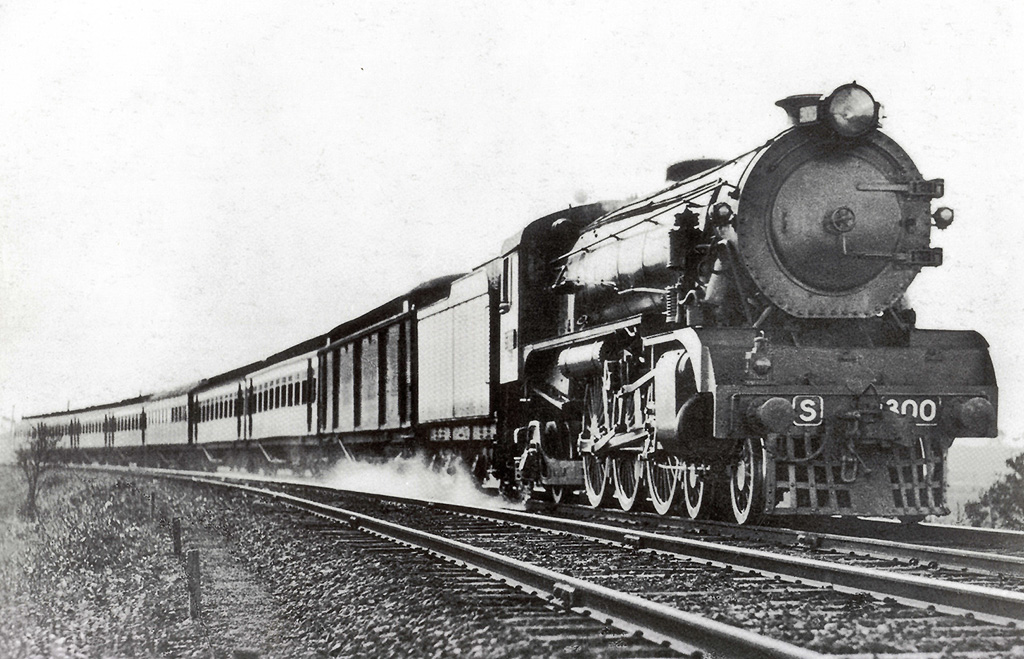
S class 4-6-2 leading the Sydney Limited between Seymour and Melbourne, circa 1928

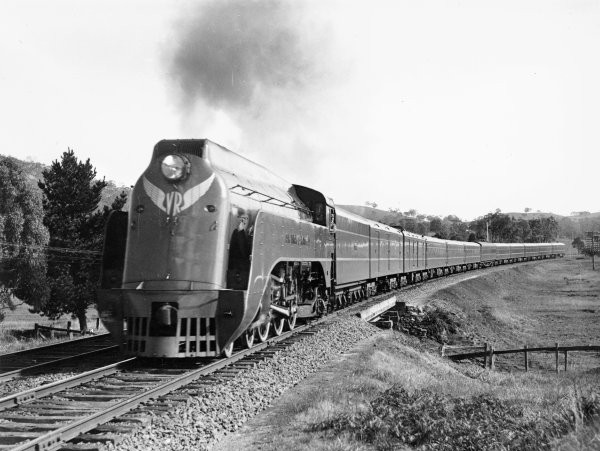
A streamlined S class locomotive hauling the Spirit of Progress near Kilmore East in 1937

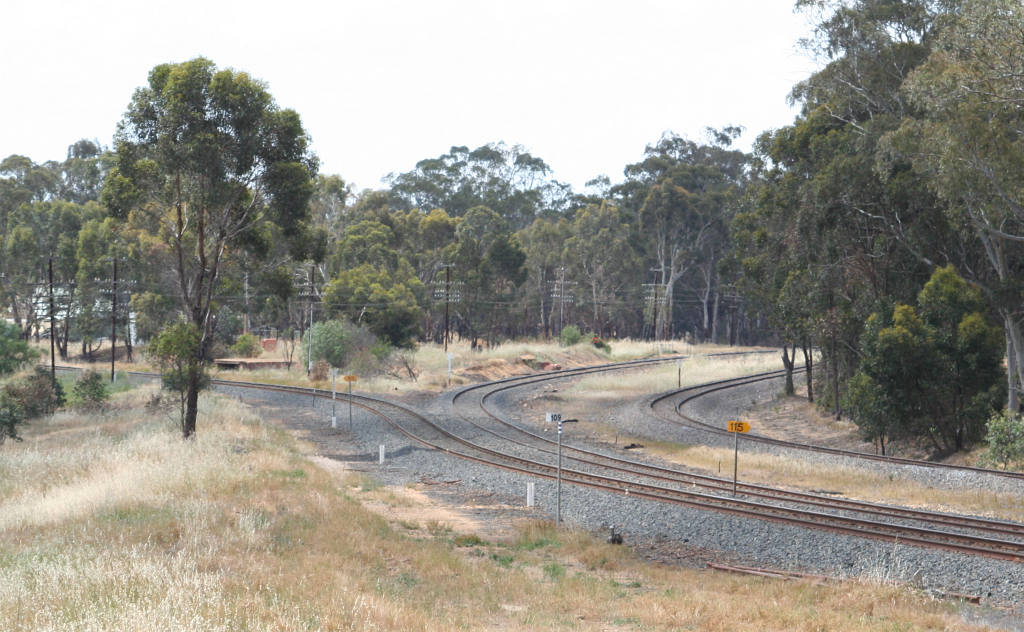
Junction of the North East and Shepparton lines at the site of Mangalore station

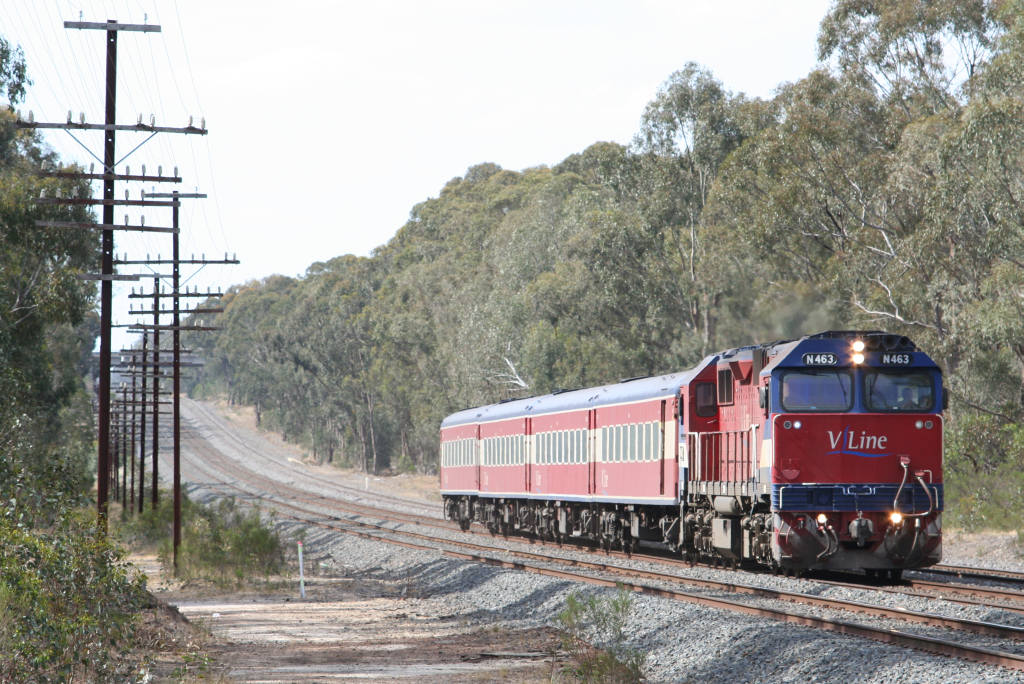
V/Line Albury line train

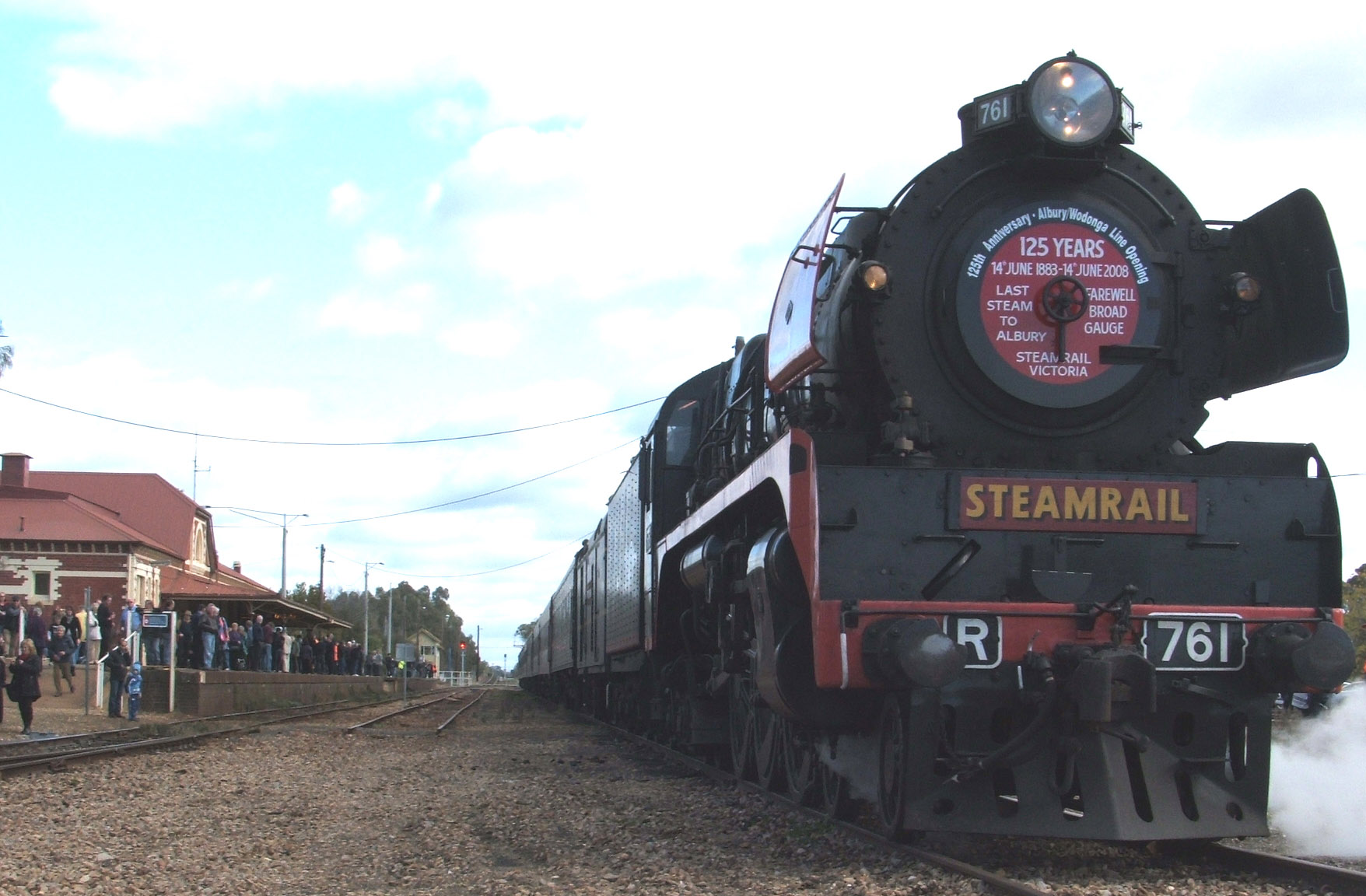
Steamrail "Farewell Broad Gauge" special, Benalla, 2008

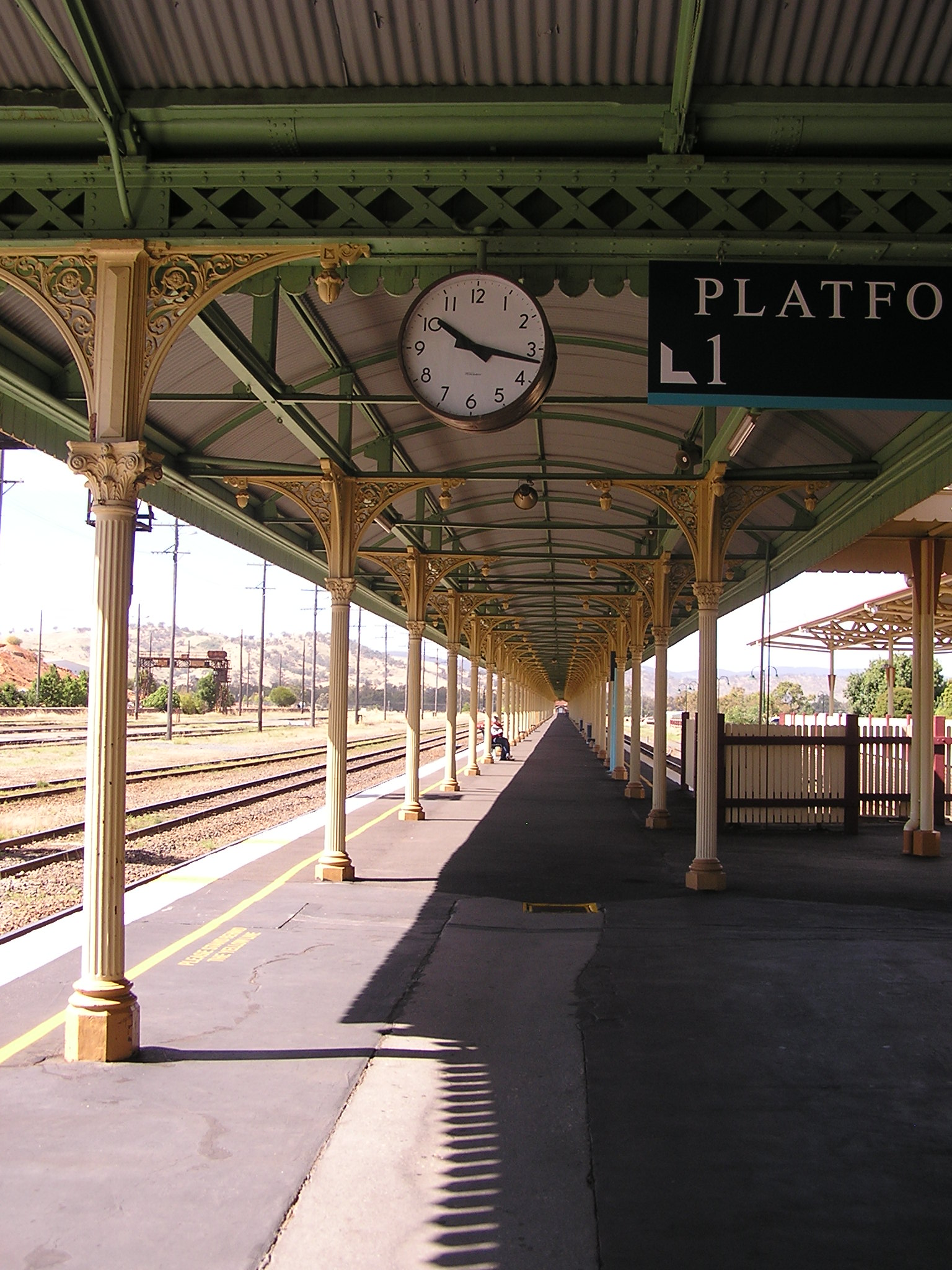
Former end of the broad gauge, the break-of-gauge platform at Albury

The Melbourne and Essendon Railway Company opened the first section of the Albury line, from North Melbourne to Essendon, in 1860. Following its takeover by the Victorian Government in 1867, the line was extended by 1872 to School House Lane on the south side of the Goulburn River near Seymour, and later that year to Seymour and then to Longwood. Violet Town, Benalla, Wangaratta, Springhurst and Wodonga were reached in 1873, connecting with the New South Wales Government Railways at Albury at a break of gauge in 1883. The design engineer was Robert Watson.

The section between Flinders Street and Essendon was used by suburban services and in May 1919, that section was part of the first lines to be electrified in Melbourne, apart from a test installation on the Flemington Racecourse line. In 1921, the line was electrified to Broadmeadows, where it remained till the extension of electrification in 2007.

Until 2008, the Albury V/line service continued to run via Essendon along the broad gauge tracks, together with the Seymour and Shepparton V/line services.

=== 1962 Standard gauge track ===
==== Construction ====
Preliminary work for construction of the standard gauge track began in November 1957 with the establishment of camps for the building gangs, with the first section being laid in November 1959. A special train had operated for journalists and railway officials along the broad gauge on 1 May 1961, to show the progress on the standard gauge alignment then under construction.

The first ballast train was operated by recently purchased W class engine W266, previously New South Wales' 7101, and five gauge-converted NN ballast hoppers. By this stage 41 miles (66 km) of track had been constructed from Wodonga heading south, and this was considered a "works siding" for operational purposes with two ballast trains per day, loaded from a temporary facility at the Melbourne end of Wodonga's new standard gauge crossing loop, followed by a Matisa tamping machine to lift the track and push the ballast sideways under the sleepers. By 7 October 1961 a second "works siding" was established from Wangaratta to Seymour, and the ballast train first arrived at the latter a week later, then proceeding further south on the 1942-built second bridge over the Goulburn River; this required reverting the broad gauge line into Seymour back to a single track connection.

After Seymour the ballast train used material quarried from a siding at Broadford, with road deliveries from the quarry to the track. On 26 November 1960 one of the two tracks of the Albion–Jacana railway line was converted from broad to standard gauge, and resignalling of the other track for bidirectional movements, and on 29 November 1961 the track reached West Footscray Junction, only a short distance from Melbourne. By this stage engine W266 and its ballast wagons had moved on to working the Seymour-Melbourne section of line, supplemented by a few QN low-sided ballast wagons, with newly delivered mainline locomotive S316 being used to consolidate the track from Wodonga.

Track sections that were to be gauge-converted, such as at Seymour and between Albion and Jacana, were managed by an almost entirely automated system. One rail was left in place, but the dogspikes for the other were lifted, followed by a specially fitted tractor that lifted the rail over to the centreline of the alignment. The sleeper plates were then moved over and refixed manually, and a second tractor lifted the rail into its new position. Finally, a mechanical spike driver installed the dogspikes in their final positions.

On 3 December 1961 a special inspection train for journalists ran on the parallel broad gauge, worked by engines S315 and S314 with a consist of AC-BS-Wimmera-Avoca-BZ-BZ-AZ-Norman (8 cars, 430 long tons (440 t)), with live commentary by the Victorian Railways' Chief Civil Engineer, Mr. L. Reynolds.

The first train to run from Wodonga into Melbourne was worked by engines S316 and S317 on 6 December 1961, hauling the Victorian Railways' ballast wagons (four QN's, four NN's), a pair of New South Wales Railways MBC bogie box vans, and the NSW Track Inspection Car No.AK417, which was fitted with a Hallade track recorder. The train ran to the end of the standard gauge track at West Footscray Junction, then propelled back to Sunshine Loop to reverse the order of the carriages and return northbound.

Spencer Street station in Melbourne was extensively rebuilt and reorganised with two dual-gauge tracks and three longer interstate platforms, opening on 18 December 1961, to accommodate the new standard gauge service as well as the anticipated increased patronage on The Overland to Adelaide.

On 2 January 1962 five tandem S Class locomotives departed Melbourne for Albury, in order to be available to bring the first few trains into Melbourne that evening and the following day. The first through interstate goods train left Alexandra Interstate Goods Terminal at 3:25 pm on 2 January 1962, arriving at North Dynon in Melbourne at 11 am the following morning worked by engines S315 (leading) and S314, which had taken over at Albury, departing at 3:47 am. The load was 22 wagons for 898 t (884 long tons; 990 short tons) tons, consisting of three FME flat wagons, one BD open wagons, seventeen LLV louvre vans and a TAM sleeping carriage conveying journalists to record the arrival. The train actually arrived at West Footscray around 9:30 am, but was held outside the terminus to the scheduled arrival time. Shortly thereafter, S316 arrived with a second train, 19 bogie vehicles and a PHG guard's van for 902 t (888 long tons; 994 short tons).

At 11:45 am, engines S314 and S315 took the first northbound goods train towards Sydney, hauling 34 wagons and a PHG guard's van for a total 35/1,742 t (1,714 long tons; 1,920 short tons). Other than the brake van, this train was composed entirely of Victorian rolling stock, with fifteen VP louvre vans, one FVF flexi-van flatcar, four BLF boxvans, three ELF open wagons and ten QCF container flatcars. This train was split at Albury into two portions due to gradients between there and Sydney. The third arrival into North Dynon at 12:20 pm was worked by S317 with about nineteen TLV vans and a PHG guard's van for 1,161 t (1,143 long tons; 1,280 short tons), on the Tinplate Express from Unanderra, New South Wales, and the fourth was S313 at 3:55 pm with 1,154 t (1,136 long tons; 1,272 short tons) of open wagons and van. At 10 pm S316 and S317 took the second northbound train, with 27/1,127 t (1,109 long tons; 1,242 short tons) of the Tinplate wagons, four ELFs, two PHG vans, the three FME flats, and the TAM sleeping car.

On Sunday 1 April, eight Victorian Railways passenger cars were sighted parked in South Dynon, having been converted to standard gauge. These cars were 1 and 2VFS, 1 and 2VHN, 1VFX, 5 and 6 VFK and 1VRS; with a ninth car of the VBK class awaiting conversion. Changes included fitting of Bradford Kendall "Commonwealth" roller bearing bogies with asbestos brake pads, modified end gangways for compatibility with New South Wales' rolling stock, and replacement of the axle-driven generator systems with 415 volt a.c. head end power electricals. The re-gauging was achieved by moving the wheels (and brake equipment) closer together on the axles, with no change to the bogie frames. Additionally, the two VHN guard's vans had their tail and side lights modified to match the arrangements of the Southern Aurora coaches. These carriages were going to be used on the newly standardised Spirit of Progress service, extended to Sydney.

The final section of track into Melbourne city opened on 5 April 1962, and the first through passenger service left Sydney on the evening of Thursday 12 April 1962. Both sets of Southern Aurora carriages were used to convey 400 passengers through to Melbourne, one set returning the next morning. Passenger services officially began on Monday 16 April 1962.

==== First days ====
In the original timetable, no trains were scheduled to pass in opposite directions at the crossing loop facilities of Somerton, Wallan, Glenrowan or Violet Town. These would have allowed for recovery from late running, as well as slots for the passenger trains that would shortly be introduced. Train numbers were copied from the New South Wales system, with a suffix "1" for northbound or "2" for southbound trains. With the line opened a new fee of £5/- per ton to or from Dynon was added, with £1/8d to the Victorian Railways and £3/4d to the New South Wales Railways. Transhipment fees were paid only if required at Albury, Wodonga or Dynon, rather than every single item having to be transhipped at Albury.

The nine intermediate crossing loops along the line were each 2,900 feet (880 m) clear of fouling points, with a generally standardised track layout which would later allow one control panel to work any of the locations remotely, first by selecting the site to be worked and then the relevant signal, point or other function. However, for the first few years the line was worked with manual controls for the turnouts, with mechanical semaphore signals on the arrival side of each Loop, and Miniature Electric Staff with Automatic Exchangers for the sections between West Footscray, Somerton, Donnybrook, Broadford and Seymour, then Train Staff and Ticket for sections between Seymour, Longwood, Benalla, Alumatta, Chiltern and Wodonga, then finally Large Electric Staff for Wodonga to Albury. The Centralised Traffic Control (C.T.C.) system was activated from Seymour to Wodonga at 10 am on Tuesday 5 February 1963, with the section from Seymour to West Footscray following within the fortnight.

The standard gauge mainline was intersected by broad gauge sidings at Tottenham, Sunshine, Albistore, Broadstore, Somerton, Tallarook (yard and Mansfield branch line), Seymour (for the locomotive depot), Mangalore, Benalla, Alumatta (for Wangaratta Cattle Siding), Bowser (for the Everton line), and Wodonga (for the Cudgewa line). Each of these crossings was controlled by an interlocked connection from the nearest signal box, though on opening of the new line some sidings were temporarily locked out of use.

The line speed was lifted from 60 mph (97 km/h) to 70 mph (110 km/h) on 1 July 1963; though in the months leading up to that observations were made that the original timetables had apparently been written with average (not maximum) speeds as high as 73.5 mph (118.3 km/h) between Chiltern and Alumatta loops (20 minutes for 24.5 mi (39.4 km)), but 25 minutes had been allowed for Melbourne-bound trains between West Footscray and Spencer Street (about 7 mi (11 km)) to counter any delays encountered on the route from Sydney.

=== Operations ===
==== Passenger services ====
The line was used by prestige passenger services between the state capitals of Melbourne and Sydney, including the Spirit of Progress, Southern Aurora, and Intercapital Daylight, each operated jointly by the Victorian and New South Wales Railways. The Southern Aurora was the new premier sleeping service, with the Spirit of Progress mostly using Victorian sitting cars running as a second division, with limited sleeping capacity that would detach at Goulburn for Canberra, while the Intercapital Daylight ran between Melbourne and Sydney during the day and stabled overnight. Each train set had two complete consists, with a handful of spare carriages available at each end for extra capacity or emergency replacements if required.

In January 1963, a standard gauge platform (the first in Victoria other than at Spencer Street) was provided adjacent to the Melbourne – Sydney standard gauge line, to enable passengers to transfer between the interstate Sydney and Adelaide expresses. The platform was constructed with steel framing and timber decking, and was 270 ft (82 m) long, sufficient for four interstate passenger carriages. It was only 7 ft 6 in (2.29 m) wide, and about 3 ft (0.91 m) lower than the adjacent broad gauge platforms but connected to the rear of Platform 1 by a 15 ft (4.6 m) wide ramp. The schedules of various trains were tweaked to make use of the new facility, such as The Overland no longer stopping at Beaufort in western Victoria to make up just enough time for the connection to work. By February 1964 the platform had been doubled in length, widening of the base of the original ramp and provision of a second, parallel ramp.

Due to high costs and declining patronage the overnight passenger trains were replaced in the 1980s by the Sydney Limited or alternately the Sydney Express / Melbourne Express, and by the 1990s both the daytime and overnight sleeping trains were replaced by a twice-daily XPT service.

==== Freight services ====
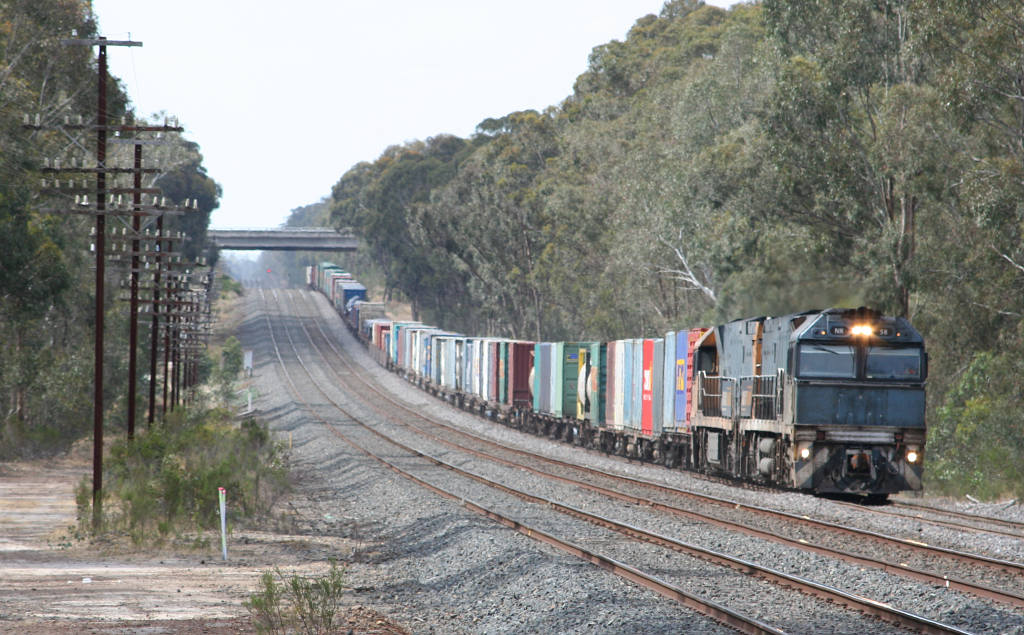
Standard-gauge Pacific National container freight train near Seymour

When the line opened there were two daily freight trains scheduled from North Dynon, a 2:50 pm express overnight freight to Sydney scheduled for one S Class locomotive hauling 700 long tons (710 t), and the second at 10:00 pm with an S and T Class locomotive to Seymour, then S Class beyond, scheduled for 1,200 long tons (1,200 t). Between these was a 5:10 pm train with a single S class and 900 long tons (910 t), to a slower schedule, which would only run if the 2:50 pm train was overloaded. Other optional trains included 1:30 am departures Thursdays and Saturdays, 9 am Mondays, Tuesdays, Wednesdays and Fridays, and 2:20 pm Saturdays; all these trains allowed time to detach the T Class engine at Seymour if it was included.

For trains towards Melbourne, there was a 3:25 pm overnight express goods from Sydney (2:12 am Albury, 8:20 am Melbourne), with a second division 5:36 am from Albury if required, at 700 long tons (710 t) and 900 long tons (910 t) respectively for single S Class engines. Additional trains from Albury were 6:19 am Thursdays if required, 11:50 am Tuesday to Saturday, 11:58 am and 1:30 pm Sundays if required, 1:32 pm Thursdays (Mondays optional), and 3:16 pm Sundays and Thursdays optional. Block trains of steel products or other dedicated traffic were scheduled from Albury as 7 pm and 11:50 pm departures, having run from Unanderra.

S Class engines were allowed 900 long tons (910 t) tons Seymour-Melbourne (or 1,200 long tons (1,200 t) with a T Class helper), 1,200 long tons (1,200 t) Seymour-Albury; permission could be given for an additional 50 long tons (51 t) in specific circumstances. No trains were scheduled to be worked solely by the T Class engine, but if they had been the limit would have been 550 long tons (560 t) northbound, or 520 long tons (530 t) southbound. The limit of 1,200 long tons (1,200 t) applied to all trains, and no train could be longer that 75 "units" (where bogie vehicles usually counted as two each, except New South Wales' TW and SL flat wagons with eight axles each, which counted as three "units"). Most trains on the standard gauge were entirely bogie stock, and in this case the limit was 40 "units".

By July 1962 the heaviest train on the line was recorded working steel from Unanderra to Melbourne, worked from Albury by two S Class and one T Class locomotive with a total weight of 2,284 long tons (2,321 t). At the time this was thought to be the heaviest train in Victoria, but subsequent reporting highlighted occasional grain trains of 2,400 long tons (2,400 t) or more.

On 11 January 1963 standard gauge sidings were extended south from Somerton, using gauntlet track to link to the Ford Australia car manufacturing plant in Upfield, Victoria. With this change additional trains were scheduled, running between Melbourne and Cook's River in Sydney, shunting at Somerton to collect wagons from Upfield northbound, and drop off empty wagons southbound. The train left Melbourne at 9 pm Mondays to Fridays (starting from 29 January 1963; the previously scheduled 8:45 pm train was moved to a 9:40 pm departure time), and the opposite train left Cook's River at 9:18 pm. The northbound train, 4141 forming 414 at Albury, arrived 2:51 pm the next day, while the southbound (407 forming 4072) arrived at 2:45 pm. These trains were restricted to a maximum load of 700 long tons (710 t). Passenger stock, of either gauge, was not permitted to operate on the Upfield-Somerton link.

By March 1963, station masters around the whole of Victoria were asked to report daily on the individual wagons of gauge convertible classes of wagons, due to "heavy increased demand" for interstate traffic. The classes listed were AF and ALF car-carrying wagons, BLF and BMF boxvans, EF and ELF open wagons, FVF, QCF, SF, SEF and TVF flat wagons, TP iced wagons, and UF, VF, VLF, VP and VHF louvre vans. By agreement with the South Australian Railways, the "F" suffix was replaced with "X" on vehicles fitted with roller bearings, marking wagons suited both for bogie exchange and operation at up to 60 mph (97 km/h). As a result, the then-under-construction Victorian extended louvre vans (VHF) and cement hoppers (CJF) were instead delivered with codes VHX and JX respectively.

=== Gauge transfer facilities ===
Initially, bogie exchange facilities were provided by crane at Bandiana, east of Wodonga, and on a section of three-rail track in Melbourne's North Dynon yard. The latter was a temporary facility pending completion of the dedicated site in South Dynon yard. North Dynon employed one gang seven days per week and another, if required, on Mondays to Fridays only, with capacity to change three bogies per hour and a maximum of 15 to 20 wagons per day (making use of spare bogies of each gauge), but this throughput was constrained by the three-rail arrangement. These spare bogies were transferred in sets of up to six between North Dynon and Newport Workshops on a specially-rebuilt, former suburban swing door carriage underframe recoded as HH158.

By December 1962 six South Australian Railways wagons had been equipped for gauge conversion in Melbourne, allowing through traffic from Adelaide to Port Kembla (scrap iron and steel northbound, tinplate southbound, in four open "O" class wagons), and from Adelaide to Sydney (two "RBX" wagons loaded with celery). Bogie exchange was facilitated at a temporary facility at North Dynon, pending provision of dedicated equipment at South Dynon. Aside from some new-build car-carrying BKX wagons, the first New South Wales wagon sighted in Victoria converted to broad gauge was open wagon BDL28385 on 15 July 1964, working empty return from Maffra; this class of wagon had not been listed in then-recent paperwork outlining which wagon classes were designated as gauge-convertible.

Some goods continued to be transferred between gauges at Albury, such as Chrysler cars built in Adelaide; these were railed through Melbourne in double-deck car carrying wagons (south Australian "OA" and Victorian "AF" class) with some continuing to Albury, where they would be transferred across to equivalent standard gauge wagons.

The South Dynon gauge transfer facility opened on Monday 8 April 1963, with room for two wagons to be bogie-exchanged simultaneously and a net capacity for 200 vehicles, or up to 7,000 long tons (7,100 t) of goods, per day.

=== Gauge conversion ===
Maintaining two parallel railways between Seymour and Albury drew criticism, noting inefficiencies in maintaining track, operating trains, and duplicated train control centres. By 2001, the State Government announced the conversion of the broad gauge line to standard, but action was stifled, due largely to complex leasing arrangements. Speed restrictions were eventually applied to the broad gauge line due to track deterioration.

In May 2008, it was announced that the tracks would be upgraded, including a 5 km (3.1 mi) bypass around Wodonga, the conversion of 200 kilometres (120 mi) of the North East railway line to standard gauge between Seymour and Albury as well as other upgrades to the North East line. Costing A$501.3 million, the Victorian Government was to contribute A$171.3 million, the Australian Government A$45 million for the Wodonga Rail Bypass, and the Australian Rail Track Corporation A$285 million and take responsibility for the standard-gauge line under a 45-year lease from Victoria. The project was due for completion by 2010, with passenger services to be disrupted for up to 12 months.

On 8 November 2008, broad gauge passenger trains ceased after the evening V/Line service from Melbourne to Albury and a special train operated by the Seymour Railway Heritage Centre, the final broad-gauge passenger train from Albury to Melbourne. In December 2008, standardisation works commenced, contracted by ARTC to the Southern Improvement Alliance. The first train on the Wodonga Rail Bypass was in March 2010.

In early August 2010, CountryLink decided to terminate all Sydney-Melbourne XPTs at Albury for an indefinite length of time, due to defects in the newly re-sleepered track. "Mud holes" resulted in speed restrictions on more than 200 kilometres (about 66 per cent) of the line, adding an extra 1.5 hours to the travelling time. Train drivers have blamed the ARTC's $285 million concrete sleeper project for the track issues, stating that the incorrect insertion of 300,000 new concrete sleepers is to blame. They have repeatedly reported freight trains breaking couplings due to the rough track. CountryLink trains resumed in mid September 2010, V/Line trains the following year.

== Derailments and Crashes ==
=== 1943 Wodonga level crossing accident ===
The Wodonga level crossing accident was a vehicle-train crash that occurred on 8 May 1943 when a passenger steam train collided with a bus carrying thirty-four Australian Army personnel at the Tallangatta Road level crossing on the Cudgewa railway line near Wodonga, Victoria, Australia. The crash resulted in 25 deaths and 9 injuries.

=== 1969 Violet Town rail accident ===
The Violet Town rail accident, also known as the Southern Aurora disaster, was a railway accident that occurred on 7 February 1969 following the incapacitation of the driver of one of the trains, near the McDiarmids Road crossing, approximately 1 km south of Violet Town, Victoria, Australia. The crash resulted in nine deaths and 117 injuries.

=== Wallan train derailment ===
On 20 February 2020, a NSW TrainLink XPT passenger train towards Sydney derailed at Wallan, resulting in suspension of freight, V/Line and NSW TrainLink services on the North East Line and the adjacent broad gauge Tocumwal railway line. V/Line services resumed on 1 and 2 March 2020.

=== Regional Rail Revival ===
The North East Line Upgrade (part of the Regional Rail Revival Program) was unveiled in mid 2018, with a series of upgrades announced to the line. Upgrades were delivered by different parties, including:

- The Australian Rail Track Corporation, which completed:
  - Track resurfacing
  - New ballast
  - New underground wires
  - Drainage improvements
  - Rail bridge upgrades
  - Mud-hole removal
  - Upgrades to 20 more rail bridges
  - The renewal of track turnouts at Violet Town and Seymour
- Rail Projects Victoria, which completed:
  - A number of level crossing closures and upgrades
  - Modifications to train stabling at South Dynon
  - Upgrades to train stabling and accessibility at Albury station

The upgrades were completed December 2020 and allowed the introduction of VLocity DMUs on the Albury V/Line rail service, replacing existing locomotive hauled train sets.

== Network and operations ==
=== Services ===
==== Seymour service ====
Seymour and Shepparton V/Line services continue to use the adjacent broad gauge tracks.

==== Albury service ====
Since 2010, the entire line is utilised by V/Line Albury trains, which stops at every station between Albury and Seymour. South of Seymour, all passenger trains heading to, and from, Melbourne (Southern Cross) only make a scheduled stop at Broadmeadows. The services are run using dedicated standard gauge VLocity DMUs.

==== Spirit of Progress ====
The Spirit of Progress was the premier express passenger train on the Victorian Railways in Australia.

From its introduction in November 1937 until April 1962 the train service ran on the broad gauge line from Spencer Street station to Albury, on the New South Wales / Victorian border, where passengers changed to a New South Wales Government Railways train (the Melbourne Limited Express), running on the standard gauge track to complete the journey to Sydney. Following the completion of the standard gauge line between Melbourne and Albury in April 1962 the Spirit of Progress was extended to Sydney. With declining passenger numbers it was decided to combine the Spirit of Progress and Southern Aurora into one train, the Sydney/Melbourne Express. The Spirit of Progress ran for the last time on 2 August 1986.

==== Intercapital Daylight ====
The Inter-Capital Daylight was a daytime express passenger train that operated between Australia's two largest cities, Sydney and Melbourne

On 26 March 1956, the New South Wales Government Railways and Victorian Railways introduced connecting daytime services named the Sydney–Melbourne (Melbourne–Sydney) Daylight Express. Following the completion of the standard gauge to Melbourne, the New South Wales train was extended to Melbourne from 16 April 1962 and named Inter-Capital Daylight. With deregulation of the Australian airline industry in the 1990s, patronage dropped to around 30%. A decision was made to cancel the service with the last service operating on 31 August 1991.

==== Southern Aurora ====
The Southern Aurora was an overnight express passenger train that operated between Australia's two largest cities, Sydney and Melbourne. First-class throughout, including the dining facilities, the Southern Aurora featured all-sleeper accommodation.

The train first ran on 13 April 1962 after the opening of the standard gauge line from Melbourne to Albury, eliminating the break-of-gauge between the capital cities. The Southern Aurora ran for the last time on 2 August 1986.

==== Sydney–Melbourne Express ====
The Sydney–Melbourne Express was an overnight intercapital passenger train service that operated between Australia's largest two cities, Sydney and Melbourne, the name depended on the direction of travel, with the train nicknamed the 'Sex' or 'Mex'.

The Sydney–Melbourne Express was formed to replace the Spirit of Progress and Southern Aurora to cut operating costs of the intercapital rail service with the first train operating on 2 August 1986. The last Melbourne Express ran on the night of 20 November 1993 ex Sydney, with the last Sydney Express running ex Melbourne on 21 November.

==== XPT ====
In November 1993, XPTs replaced locomotive hauled stock on the overnight Sydney/Melbourne Express. In December 1994 an XPT daylight service to Melbourne was introduced by extending the Riverina XPT from Albury.

The entire line is used by NSW TrainLink Southern services to, and from, Sydney (Central), which makes limited stops on this section. The services are run using New South Wales XPT diesel-powered passenger trains.

=== Operators ===
==== New South Wales operators ====
| Operator | Assumed operations | Ceased operations | Length of operations |
|---|---|---|---|
| Department of Railways New South Wales | 3 January 1962 | 19 October 1972 | 10 years |
| Public Transport Commission, NSW | 20 October 1972 | 30 June 1980 | 7 years |
| State Rail Authority, NSW | 1 July 1980 | 16 January 1989 | 8 years |
| State Rail Authority (as CountryLink) | 16 January 1989 | 31 December 2003 | 14 years |
| RailCorp (as CountryLink) | 1 January 2004 | 30 June 2013 | 9 years |
| NSW TrainLink | 30 June 2013 | incumbent | 13 years (ongoing) |

==== Victorian operators ====
| Operator | Assumed operations | Ceased operations | Length of operations |
|---|---|---|---|
| Melbourne and Essendon Railway Company | 21 October 1860 | 1 July 1864 | 3 years |
| Victorian Railways | 31 October 1867 | 30 June 1983 | 115 years |
| Metropolitan Transit Authority (The Met) | 1 July 1983 | 30 June 1989 | 5 years |
| State Transport Authority (V/Line) | 1 July 1983 | 30 June 1989 | 5 years |
| Public Transport Corporation (The Met) | 1 July 1989 | 30 June 1998 | 8 years |
| Public Transport Corporation (V/Line) | 1 July 1989 | 1995 | 6 years |
| Public Transport Corporation (V/Line Passenger) | 1995 | 30 June 1998 | 31 months |
| Bayside Trains | 1 July 1998 | 29 August 1999 | 13 months |
| V/Line Passenger | 1 July 1998 | 29 August 1999 | 13 months |
| National Express Group (as Bayside Trains) | 29 August 1999 | October 2000 | 13 months |
| National Express Group (as V/Line Passenger) | 29 August 1999 | 22 December 2002 | 3 years |
| National Express Group (as M>Train) | October 2000 | 22 December 2002 | 26 months |
| M>Train | 22 December 2002 | 18 April 2004 | 15 months |
| V/Line Passenger | 22 December 2002 | 1 July 2010 | 7 years |
| Connex Melbourne | 18 April 2004 | 29 November 2009 | 5 years |
| Metro Trains Melbourne | 30 November 2009 | incumbent | 16 years (ongoing) |
| V/Line | 1 July 2010 | incumbent | 16 years (ongoing) |

=== Stations ===
==== BG ====
Station Histories (broad gauge only)
| Station | Opened | Closed | Age | Notes |
|---|---|---|---|---|
| Flagstaff | 27 May 1985 | | 41 years | |
| Melbourne Central | 26 January 1981 | | 45 years | Formerly Museum |
| Parliament | 22 January 1983 | | 43 years | |
| Flinders Street | 12 September 1854 | | 172 years | Formerly Melbourne Terminus |
| Southern Cross (BG) | 17 January 1859 | | 167 years | Formerly Batman's Hill; Formerly Spencer Street |
| North Melbourne | 6 October 1859 | | 167 years | |
| Kensington | 1 November 1860 | 1 July 1864 | 3 years | Melbourne and Essendon Railway Company |
| Kensington | 9 October 1871 | | 155 years | |
| Newmarket | 1 November 1860 | 1 July 1864 | 3 years | Melbourne and Essendon Railway Company |
| Newmarket | 9 October 1871 | | 155 years | |
| Ascot Vale | 1 November 1860 | 1 July 1864 | 3 years | Melbourne and Essendon Railway Company |
| Ascot Vale | 9 October 1871 | | 155 years | |
| Moonee Ponds | 1 November 1860 | 1 July 1864 | 3 years | Melbourne and Essendon Railway Company |
| Moonee Ponds | 9 October 1871 | | 155 years | |
| Essendon | 1 November 1860 | 1 July 1864 | 3 years | Melbourne and Essendon Railway Company |
| Essendon | 9 October 1871 | | 155 years | |
| Glenbervie | 11 September 1922 | | 104 years | |
| Strathmore | 28 October 1890 | | 136 years | Formerly North Essendon |
| Pascoe Vale | 10 November 1885 | | 141 years | |
| Oak Park | 13 August 1956 | | 70 years | |
| Glenroy | 24 January 1887 | | 139 years | |
| Jacana | 15 February 1959 | | 67 years | |
| Broadmeadows (BG) | 1 February 1873 | | 153 years | |
| Broadstore Siding | 12 October 1942 | c. 1980's | Approx. 38 years | |
| Coolaroo | 6 June 2010 | | 16 years | |
| Roxburgh Park | 18 April 1872 | 24 September 1963 | 91 years | Was originally Somerton |
| Roxburgh Park | 1 October 2007 | | 19 years | Reopened as Roxburgh Park |
| Somerton Yard (BG) | 30 June 1889 | | 137 years | |
| Craigieburn | 18 April 1872 | | 154 years | |
| Donnybrook | 14 October 1872 | | 154 years | |
| Beveridge | 14 October 1872 | 2 April 1990 | 117 years | |
| Wallan | 18 April 1872 | | 154 years | |
| Lightwood | 1890 | 24 April 1941 | 50 years | Formerly Merri Merri Siding; Formerly Merri; Formerly Merri Siding |
| Heathcote Junction | 17 March 1890 | | 136 years | Formerly Kilmore Junction |
| Wandong | 11 April 1876 | | 150 years | Also known as Morpeth's Siding |
| Mathieson's Siding | 12 August 1885 | ? | | Was originally Wandong Ballast Pits Siding |
| Mathieson's Siding | 2 July 1888 | 26 February 1924 | 35 years | Reopened as Mathieson's Siding |
| Kilmore East | 18 April 1872 | | 154 years | Formerly Kilmore |
| Kilmore East Quarry Siding | 13 September 1976 | | 50 years | |
| Broadford | 18 April 1872 | | 154 years | |
| McDougall's Siding | 26 March 1890 | 13 January 1987 | 96 years | Formerly McDougall |
| Lowry's Siding | 19 November 1888 | c. 31 May 1909 | Approx. 20 years | |
| Tallarook | 18 April 1872 | | 154 years | |
| Dysart | 18 April 1872 | 20 August 1872 | 4 months | Was originally Schoolhouse Lane |
| Dysart | 1 June 1889 | 3 May 1987 | 97 years | Formerly Schoolhouse Lane; Also known as Dysart Military Siding |
| Seymour (BG) | 26 August 1872 | | 154 years | |
| Gravelside Siding | 24 June 1885 | c. 6 December 1890 | Approx. 5 years | Was originally Gravel Pit Sidings |
| Gravelside Siding | 7 August 1894 | 11 January 1938 | 43 years | Formerly Gravel Pit Sidings |
| Mangalore | 13 January 1880 | c. 5 October 1982 | Approx. 102 years | |
| Avenel (BG) | 20 November 1872 | 9 November 2008 | 135 years | |
| Monea | 27 February 1882 | 13 June 1960 | 78 years | |
| Locksley | 18 October 1882 | 1 April 1973 | 90 years | Formerly Burnt Creek Wood Siding; Formerly Burnt Creek |
| Longwood | 20 November 1872 | c. 5 October 1982 | Approx. 109 years | |
| Creighton | 9 February 1887 | 1 September 1970 | 83 years | Formerly Synon's Siding; Formerly Creighton's Creek |
| Euroa (BG) | 20 March 1873 | 9 November 2008 | 135 years | |
| Balmattum | 12 March 1889 | 24 July 1965 | 76 years | |
| Violet Town (BG) | 20 March 1873 | 9 November 2008 | 135 years | |
| Burkes Hill Siding | 25 April 1889 | 5 February 1892 | 33 months | |
| Burkes Hill Siding | 13 October 1899 | 14 July 1902 | 33 months | |
| Baddaginnie | 19 June 1882 | 7 May 1978 | 95 years | |
| Hanson's Siding | 3 May 1904 | c. 3 February 1925 | Approx. 20 years | Formerly Caelli's Siding |
| Benalla (BG) | 18 August 1873 | 9 November 2008 | 135 years | |
| Winton | 9 December 1877 | 1 May 1971 | 93 years | |
| Head's Siding | 9 September 1907 | c. 20 Oct 1942 | Approx. 35 years | Formerly Head and Green's Siding |
| Glenrowan | 2 November 1874 | c. 5 October 1982 | Approx. 107 years | |
| Alumatta Siding | 17 June 1882 | c. 1908 | Approx. 26 years | Was originally Wangaratta Meat Siding |
| Alumatta Siding | 16 April 1943 | 16 August 1989 | 46 years | Reopened as Alumatta Siding |
| Wangaratta (BG) | 28 October 1873 | 9 November 2008 | 135 years | |
| Bowser | 2 February 1891 | 1 October 1972 | 81 years | Formerly Beechworth Junction |
| Springhurst (BG) | 29 November 1873 | 9 November 2008 | 134 years | Formerly Springs; Also known as Bontherambo or Naringa |
| Barambogie Ballast Siding | 1874 | 1876 | 24 months | Was originally Doma Mungi Siding |
| Barambogie Ballast Siding | February 1922 | 7 April 1933 | 11 years | Reopened as State Rivers & Water Supply Commission's Siding |
| Barambogie Ballast Siding | 7 January 1935 | 14 September 1960 | 25 years | Reopened as Chiltern Valley Siding |
| Chiltern (BG) | c. 1873 | 9 November 2008 | Approx. 134 years | |
| Barnawartha | c. 1873 | 26 October 1986 | Approx. 112 years | |
| Wodonga West | ? | 1899 | | |
| Wodonga (BG) | 21 November 1873 | 9 November 2008 | 134 years | |
| Wodonga Coal Siding (BG) | 7 August 1916 | 9 November 2008 | 92 years | inc. Bogie exchange area |
| Albury (BG) | 14 June 1883 | 9 November 2008 | 125 years | |

==== SG ====
Station histories (standard gauge only)
| Station | Opened | Closed | Age | Notes |
|---|---|---|---|---|
| Southern Cross (SG) | 16 March 1962 | | 64 years | Formerly Spencer Street |
| Victoria Dock (Westgate) | ? | | | |
| Appleton Dock | ? | | | |
| Swanson Dock | c. 1969 | | Approx. 57 years | |
| Melbourne Yard | ? | | | |
| Melbourne Steel Terminal | 1995 | 2015 | 20 years | |
| South Dynon | 1964 | | 62 years | |
| North Dynon | ? | | | |
| Sunshine (SG) | January 1963 | 2004 | 41 years | |
| McIntyre Sidings | 12 May 1964 | | 62 years | Formerly Lysaght's Siding |
| Broadmeadows (SG) | 2009 | | 17 years | |
| Somerton Yard (SG) | 5 August 1962 | | 64 years | |
| Seymour (SG) | 1974 | | 52 years | |
| Avenel (SG) | August 2010 | | 16 years | |
| Euroa (SG) | August 2010 | | 16 years | |
| Violet Town (SG) | August 2010 | | 16 years | |
| Benalla (SG) | 10 March 1964 | | 62 years | |
| Wangaratta (SG) | 10 March 1964 | | 62 years | |
| Springhurst (SG) | August 2010 | | 16 years | |
| Chiltern (SG) | August 2010 | | 16 years | |
| SCT Barnawartha | October 2016 | | 10 years | |
| Wodonga (SG) | 25 June 2011 | | 15 years | |
| Wodonga Coal Siding (SG) | 7 August 1916 | 1 September 2009 | 93 years | inc. Bogie exchange area |
| Albury (SG) | 3 February 1881 | | 145 years | |

== Infrastructure ==
=== Branch lines ===
==== South of Craigieburn ====
In October 1889, the Upfield railway line was extended to Somerton, but closed in July 1903. In March 1928, despite strong resistance from the Railways Commissioners, the state government ordered the reopening of the section from Fawkner to near Somerton for passengers, although no actually connection was provided at this time.In May 1956, the line from Fawkner to Somerton was again closed, but only three years later, in July 1959, the Upfield to Somerton section reopened for goods trains. In January 1963, the line from Somerton to the Ford factory was re-laid as dual gauge gauntlet track, a year after the North East standard gauge line through Somerton opened.

A branch line was opened during the Second World War to Broadstore, designed to connect Broadmeadows station with the Maygar Barracks. The line opened on 12 October 1942 and remaining in operation until 1982, when usage of the base began to.

==== Between Craigieburn and Seymour ====
A branch line opened from Heathcote Junction (near Kilmore) to Kilmore in 1888 and to Tooborac in 1890, connecting with a line from Bendigo to Heathcote opened a little earlier. The Heathcote Junction – Heathcote line closed in 1968. A branch line from Kilmore to Lancefield opened in 1892, closed in 1904.

The Mansfield line opened from Tallarook to Yea in 1883, Molesworth in 1889, Cathkin and Merton in 1890 and Mansfield in 1891. It is now closed. A branch line was built from Cathkin to Koriella in 1890 and Alexandra in 1909. This line closed in 1978.

==== North of Seymour ====
The Tocumwal line opened from Mangalore to Toolamba, Shepparton and Tocumwal in 1880.

A branch line opened from Benalla to St James in 1883, Yarrawonga in 1886 and Oaklands in 1938, with a break of gauge there until the State Rail Authority line closed south of Boree Creek. A second 18 1/4-mile (29.4 km) branch line from Benalla to Tatong was opened in 1914 and closed in 1947. In 2008 with the gauge conversion the Albury line from broad gauge to standard gauge would have left the Oaklands branch as an isolated and useless spur. The local MP reported that the cost of converting this 125 km (77.7 mi) branch to standard gauge was just over $13m. In October 2008 the Victorian State Government announced that an upgrade would take place. The conversion was completed in December 2009.

The narrow-gauge Whitfield branch line opened from Wangaratta to Whitfield in 1899, closing in 1953.

A branch line opened from Bowser (north of Wangaratta) to Everton in 1875, which was extended to Beechworth in 1876 and Yackandandah in 1891. The line closed in 1954. Another branch line was built from Everton to Myrtleford in 1883 and Bright in 1890, now closed.

A short line to Peechelba East, which opened in 1928 and closed in 1986, also branched from Bowser.

A short branch line opened from Springhurst via Rutherglen to Wahgunyah in 1879. Services were suspended in 1995.

A branch line opened from Wodonga to Tallangatta between 1889 and 1891, Shelley in 1916, Beetoomba in 1919 and Cudgewa in 1921. A connection from Albury was added near Wodonga, creating a turning triangle to enable the Sydney Limited and its successor Spirit of Progress with their observation cars to be turned as complete trains. part of the line was converted to dual gauge in 1944 to serve freight depots around Bandiana. The line closed beyond Bandiana in 1981, and the connection to Wodonga later removed, with only standard gauge traffic continuing to use the line via Albury. The Wodonga-Bandiana section closed on 1 September 2009 as part of the Wodonga Rail Bypass project.

=== Maintenance ===
Alongside the passenger trains, North East line tracks and equipment are maintained by a fleet of engineering trains. The two types of engineering trains are: the shunting train, designed for moving trains along non-electrified corridors and for transporting other maintenance locomotives; and the infrastructure evaluation carriage designed for general infrastructure evaluation including track and electrical infrastructure (if travelling along electrified corridors). Most of these trains are repurposed locomotives previously used by V/Line, Metro Trains, and the Southern Shorthaul Railroad.
