= Barnawartha railway station =

Former railway station in Victoria, Australia

Coordinates: 36°06′11″S 146°40′45″E

Barnawartha
- Disused goods shed at Barnawartha in 2026

General information
- Line: North East
- Platforms: 1
- Tracks: 2

Other information
- Status: Closed

History
- Opened: 21 November 1873
- Closed: 1985

Services
| Preceding station | VicRail | Following station |
|---|---|---|
| Chiltern towards Spencer Street | Albury line | Wodonga towards Albury |
Location

Barnawartha is a closed station located in the town of Barnawartha, on the North East railway, in Victoria, Australia. The station building and platform lie between the Melbourne – Albury standard gauge line, opened in 1962, and the former broad gauge line, converted to standard gauge in 2010. There is a disused goods shed to the west of the tracks.

The station opened with the line in 1873, with a temporary passenger shelter and a large brick goods shed. In 1885, a signal cabin was provided, as well as platform extensions, and construction of a siding to a nearby flour mill. In 1889, the brick station building was erected and, in 1925, the signal frame was made part of the station building. At the same time, all tracks in the yard were lengthened to accommodate longer trains. Closed in 1985, the buildings remain largely intact, but the sidings have been removed and the west track realigned away from the platform.

Barnawartha was the site of a collision between a Melbourne-bound goods train and the Melbourne-bound Spirit of Progress on 17 June 1982. The collision, which happened north of the station, in heavy fog, occurred after the crew of the goods train ran past a red signal protecting the stationary Spirit of Progress, which had broken down due to a loss of power to the engine. The goods train ran into the back of the Spirit at a speed of 46 km/h, killing the two-man crew on board the goods train, and injuring nine other people. Train controllers in Melbourne could not warn the goods train crew of the danger due to the lack of two-way radio systems on board locomotives at the time.

A number of alterations took place at Barnawartha in 1987, including the abolition of four signal posts, a number of points, the former platform road (No. 1 track), and the dead end extension of No. 3 road.
