= Balmattum railway station =

Former railway station in Victoria, Australia

Coordinates: 36°41′48″S 145°37′44″E

Balmattum

General information
- Line: North East

Other information
- Status: Closed

History
- Opened: 12 March 1889
- Closed: 24 July 1965

Services
Preceding station	V/Line	Following station
Euroa towards Southern Cross	North East line	Violet Town towards Albury
List of closed railway stations in Victoria
Location

Balmattum is a closed station located in the township of Balmattum, on the North East railway in Victoria, Australia. It had a single platform on the eastern side of the broad gauge line, with the standard gauge running behind.

The station opened in 1889 for firewood traffic, with numerous sawmills located in the immediate area, with passenger facilities were first provided in 1890. In 1916 the yard was rebuilt with a new platform and signal box, three road yard, and a goods siding. The station was closed to all traffic except wagon loads in 1965, and today there is little left of the station.
