= Creighton railway station =

Former railway station in Victoria, Australia

Coordinates: 36°46′31″S 145°29′22″E

Creighton

General information
- Line: North East

Other information
- Status: Closed

History
- Opened: 9 February 1887
- Closed: 25 July 1965

Services
Preceding station	V/Line	Following station
Longwood towards Southern Cross	North East line	Euroa towards Albury
List of closed railway stations in Victoria
Location

Creighton is a closed station located in the township of Creighton, on the North East railway in Victoria, Australia. The station had a single platform on the east side of the broad gauge line, with the standard gauge line running behind. The station opened in 1887 as Synon's Siding, to serve a sawmill of the same name. In 1888 it was renamed Creighton's Creek which was then shortened to Creighton.

By 1901 the station was open only for firewood traffic, but reopened in 1908 with additional sidings. In 1911 the main line was slewed away from the platform along number 2 road, leaving it on a loop siding. This remained until 1916 when the station was again rebuilt, a new goods shed and sidings provided, in addition to a new station building and 30 lever signalling frame. The station was closed to all traffic except for truck loads of goods on 25 July 1965 and then removed in 1967. Today there is nothing left of the station.
