= Chiltern railway station =

Railway station in Victoria, Australia

Chiltern
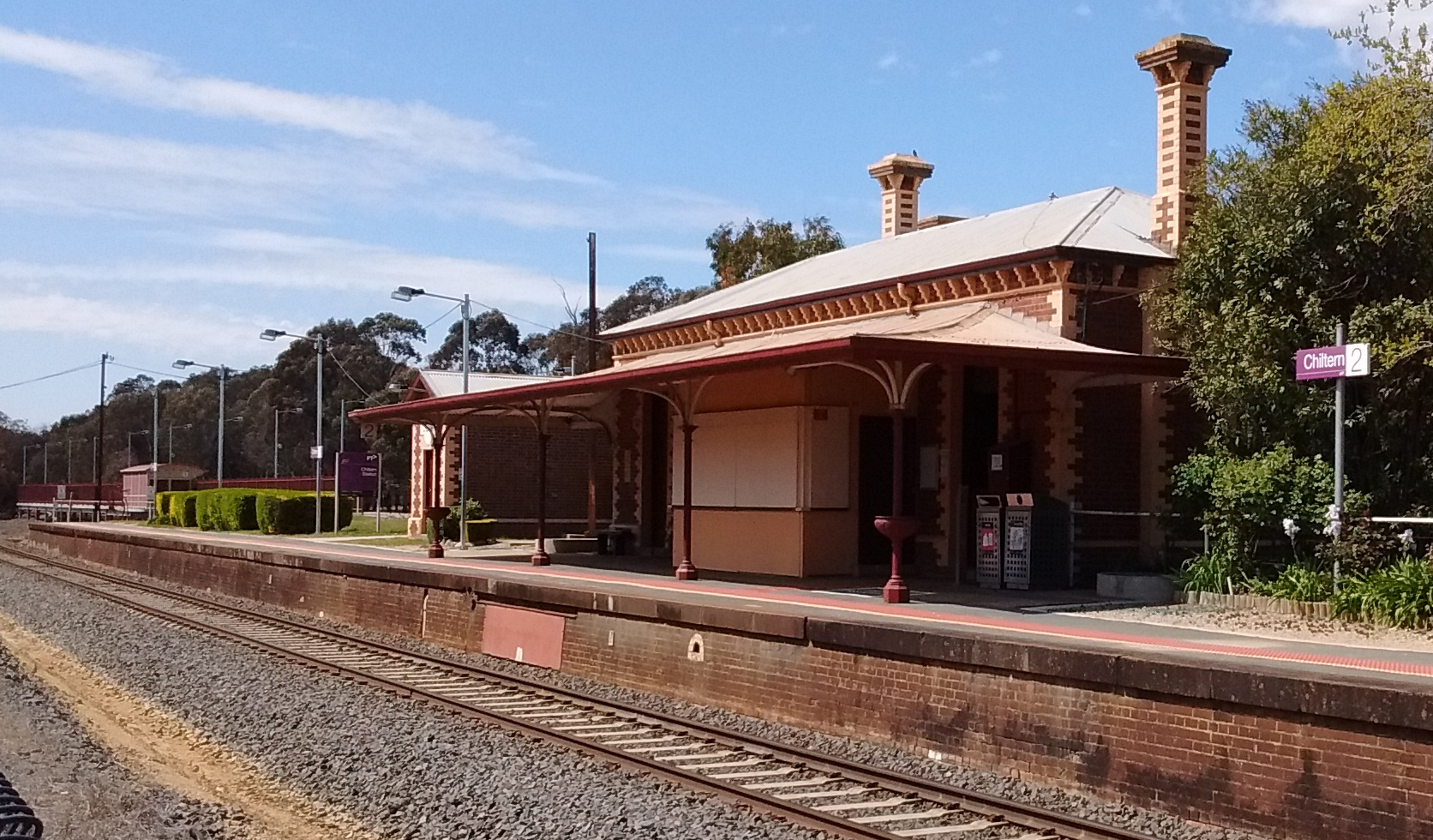
- Eastbound view of Platform 2 and station building, September 2015

General information
- Location: Victoria Street, Chiltern, Victoria 3683; Shire of Indigo; Australia
- Coordinates: 36°09′21″S 146°36′42″E
- System: PTV regional rail station
- Owner: VicTrack
- Operator: V/Line
- Line: Albury (North East)
- Distance: 271.32 kilometres from Southern Cross
- Platforms: 2 side
- Tracks: 2

Construction
- Structure type: Ground
- Parking: 10
- Cycle facilities: Yes
- Accessible: Yes

Other information
- Status: Operational, unstaffed
- Station code: CHI
- Fare zone: Myki zone 22/23
- Website: Public Transport Victoria

History
- Opened: 21 November 1873; 152 years ago
- Rebuilt: 2011; 15 years ago

Services
Preceding station	V/Line	Following station
Springhurst towards Southern Cross	Albury line	Wodonga towards Albury
Former services
Preceding station	VicRail	Following station
Springhurst towards Spencer Street	Albury line	Barnawartha towards Albury
Location
- Location within Victoria

Chiltern railway station is located on the North East line in Victoria, Australia. It serves the town of Chiltern, and it opened on 21 November 1873.

== Description ==
A disused goods shed is located at the station. The goods shed was converted into a community centre in 2011, and on 4 March 2021, ownership was transferred to the Chiltern Model Club.

Disused station Barnawartha is located between Chiltern and Wodonga stations.

== History ==
In 1978, No. 4 road and the goods platform was abolished.

It was closed as a staff station on 19 June 1987. Former No.2 and No.3 roads were removed by 10 July of the same year.

In 2000, the former crossing loop on the standard gauge line was extended by 670 metres at the down end.

The original platform was located on the broad gauge line. Between 2008 and 2011, this line was converted to standard gauge, and another platform was built on the existing 1962 built standard gauge line.

== Platforms and services ==
Chiltern has two side platforms. It is serviced by V/Line Albury line services.

Chiltern platform arrangement
Platform	Line	Destination
1	Albury line	Southern Cross
2	Albury line	Albury
