= Baddaginnie railway station =

Former railway station in Victoria, Australia

Baddaginnie
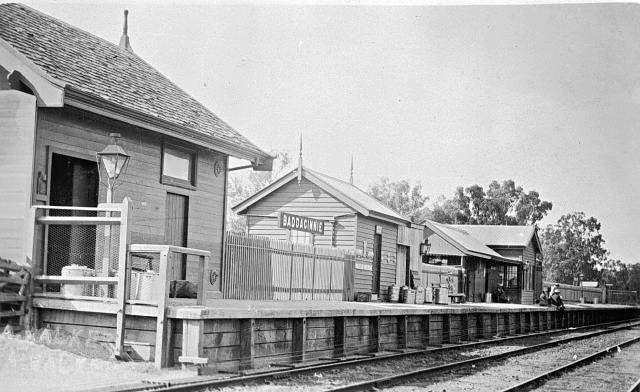
- The station c. 1905

General information
- Coordinates: 36°35′24″S 145°51′56″E
- Line: North East

Other information
- Status: Closed

History
- Opened: 19 June 1882
- Closed: 5 July 1978

Services
Preceding station	Disused railways	Following station
Violet Town	North East line	Benalla
	List of closed railway stations in Victoria	
Location

Baddaginnie is a closed station located in the township of Baddaginnie, on the North East railway in Victoria, Australia. The station had a single platform to the west of the broad gauge line, with the standard gauge line running parallel to it.

The station opened on 19 June 1882 for goods, and on 3 July of that year for passenger traffic. A new platform, station building and goods shed were provided in 1908, and these remained until the 1960s, when it was rebuilt to allow the standard gauge line to run through the goods shed. The broad gauge crossing loop was extended and a new signal box was provided, along with a replacement goods siding and shed behind the platform. The station remained open to passengers until 5 July 1978, when with the introduction of the Winter Timetable, it was closed completely. By the end of July 1979, the goods shed and the livestock yard were dismantled, with the station completely removed by October of that year. The goods platform was still visible in 2008.
