= Broadstore Siding =

Former railway siding in Australia

The Broadstore Siding was a 1.6-kilometre (1.0 mi) long railway siding in the suburb of Campbellfield, Melbourne, Australia, that served the Australian Army's Maygar Barracks. The siding branched from Broadmeadows station, on the Craigieburn line, and ran in an eastern direction, crossing (at grade) Blair Street and Railway Crescent.

A branch line was provided during the Second World War to Broadstore, commencing from north-east of Broadmeadows station, opening on 12 October 1942, and remaining in place until 1982; the tracks were not lifted until after 1991. The Broadstore Line was unelectrified, and extended in a directly easterly direction for approximately 1.6 km (0.99 mi) towards the Upfield Line terminating at the Maygar Barracks in Campbellfield. The Broadstore Line was marked on the 1980 map of Victorian Railways, with its closure taking place shortly afterwards. The line has now been turned into the Meadowlink rail-trail for the majority of its length. The City of Hume completed the project which involved converting the former railway line into a 4 ha (9.9-acre) community open space, naming it the Meadowlink Linear Park.
