= Longwood railway station =

Former railway station in Victoria, Australia

Coordinates: 36°48′08″S 145°25′06″E

Longwood

General information
- Line: North East
- Platforms: 1
- Tracks: 2

Other information
- Status: Closed

History
- Opened: 20 November 1872
- Closed: 4 October 1981

Services
Preceding station	V/Line	Following station
Locksley towards Southern Cross	North East line	Creighton towards Albury
List of closed railway stations in Victoria
Location

Longwood is a closed station located in the town of Longwood, on the North East line, in Victoria, Australia. The station had a single platform on the east side of the former broad gauge line, with the standard gauge line running behind, in a 19 feet (5.8 m) deep cutting, with a pedestrian overpass providing station access. A former passing loop, with the same name, was located nearby.

The station opened on 20 November 1872, as the temporary northern terminus of the line. A large goods shed was provided, with a station building erected in 1878. In 1885, a signal cabin was provided on the platform, being incorporated into the station building in 1916, and a crossing loop provided in 1926. The station was one of 35 closed to passenger traffic on 4 October 1981, as part of the New Deal for Country Passengers. In 1987, a number of points at the station were spiked normal, and later removed.
