= Longwood, Victoria =

Longwood
- Town
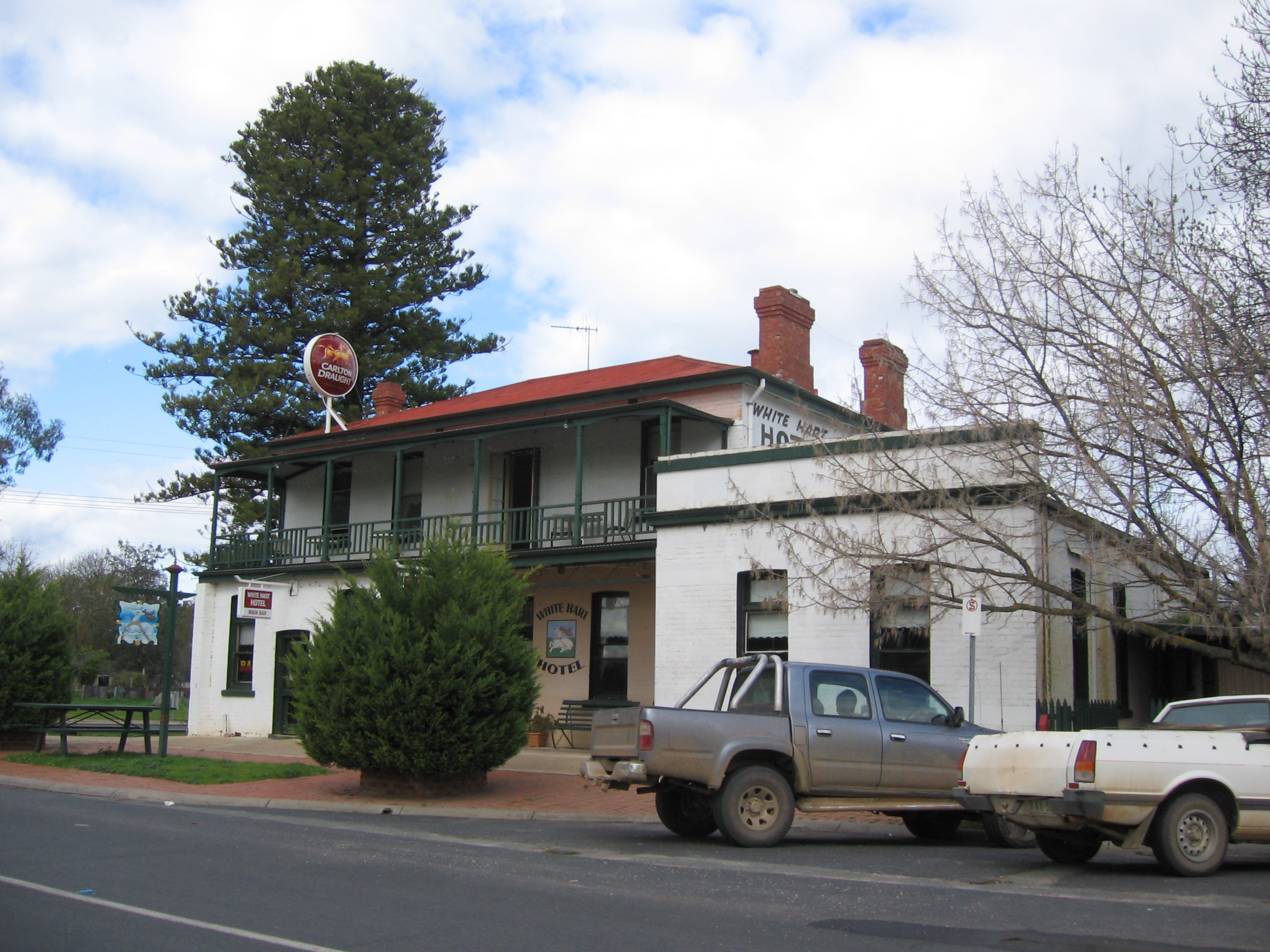
- White Hart Hotel

- Coordinates: 36°48′S 145°25′E
- Country: Australia
- State: Victoria
- Region: Hume
- LGA: Shire of Strathbogie
- Location: 149 km (93 mi) N of Melbourne; 54 km (34 mi) S of Shepparton; 15 km (9.3 mi) SW of Euroa

Government
  - State electorate: Euroa
  - Federal division: Nicholls

Population
  - Total: 263 (2021 census)
- Postcode: 3665

Longwood is a town in northern Victoria, Australia. The town is located in the Shire of Strathbogie local government area, 149 kilometres (93 mi) from the state capital, Melbourne. At the 2021 census, Longwood had a population of 263.

== History ==
Longwood was first located on the old Sydney to Melbourne Highway (in the paddocks at Fred Tubb's farm) serving as a staging post for the horse-drawn coaches. The town moved east by around 4 km when the railway was built and a station established at Longwood.

The Post Office opened on 1 July 1852 and the office named Longwood Railway Station opened in 1881. Longwood was later renamed Longwood East and Longwood Railway Station was renamed to Longwood. The town and surrounding countryside was the scene of a devastating bushfire on 17 January 1965. Seven people died fleeing the flames in a car.

The Longwood Football Club was formed in April 1888 and still operates to this day. The team once known as the Bullants is now known as the Redlegs, and have competed in the Kyabram District League since 2010. The club has had its share of success and also leaner times more recently.

== Today ==
The town has an Australian Rules football team competing in the Kyabram & District Football League.

There is one primary school, Longwood Primary School. It has a small student population but a large plantation area at the back where the students can build houses and explore nature. There are 2 teachers at the school and the current principal is Mr. Michael Greenaway.

The town is home to one hotel, The White Hart, moved to its current location on the corner of Down and Hill Streets when the Melbourne-Sydney train line was constructed around 1880.

== Notable people ==
The town was the birthplace of World War I veterans, Victoria Cross recipient Frederick Harold Tubb, Lieutenant-Colonel Aubrey Roy Liddon Wiltshire and Army Medical Officer, Sir Charles Ryan and his sister, botanical artist Ellis Rowan, both at "Killeen Station".
