= Albury line =

Passenger rail service in Victoria and New South Wales, Australia

Albury

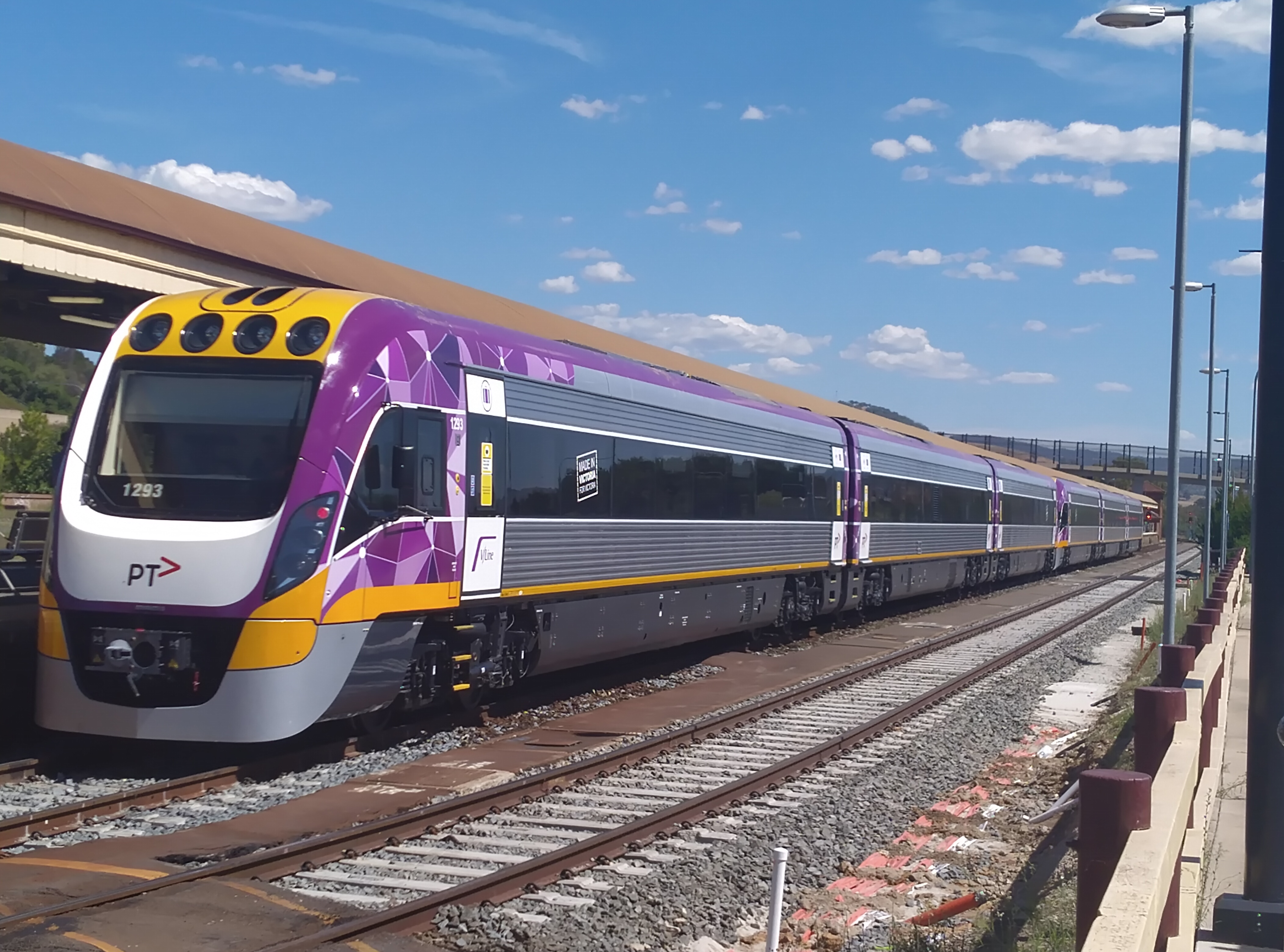
- V/Line VLocitys at Albury in December 2021

Overview
- Service type: Regional rail
- System: Victorian railway network
- Status: Operational
- Locale: Victoria, Australia
- Predecessor: Longwood (1872–1873); Wodonga (1873–1883); Spirit of Progress ^ (1937–1962); Intercapital Daylight ^ (1956–1962)^ broad gauge
- First service: 18 April 1872; 154 years ago
- Current operator: V/Line
- Former operators: Victorian Railways (1872–1983); STA (V/Line) (1983–1989); PTC (V/Line) (1989–1995); PTC (V/Line Passenger) (1995–1998); V/Line Passenger (1998–2010)
- Website: V/Line Seymour on X

Route
- Termini: Southern Cross; Albury
- Stops: 12
- Distance travelled: 315.935 km (196.313 mi)
- Service frequency: Three services daily each direction
- Lines used: South Kensington–West Footscray, Albion–Jacana, North East

On-board services
- Class: Economy
- Disabled access: Yes
- Catering facilities: Yes
- Baggage facilities: Yes

Technical
- Rolling stock: VLocity
- Track gauge: 1,435 mm (4 ft 8 1/2 in)
- Track owner: VicTrack

The Albury line is a regional passenger rail service operated by V/Line in Victoria, Australia. It serves passengers between the state capital of Melbourne and the regional cities of Benalla, Wangaratta, Wodonga, and the New South Wales border city of Albury.

The line forms part of V/Line's Canberra Link service, with passengers from Melbourne switching to a coach at Wodonga or Albury that travels to Jolimont Centre in Canberra.

== History ==
=== 21st century ===
==== Conversion to standard gauge ====
After February 2008, train services on the line terminated at Wangaratta station, with road coaches operating from Wangaratta to Albury. This was due to the deteriorating track conditions between Seymour and Albury which were resulting in train speeds being reduced from 115 to 80 km/h (71 to 50 mph), and trains not being able to make the return journey in the timetabled period.

On 30 May 2008, the then Premier of Victoria John Brumby announced the broad gauge track between Seymour and Albury would be converted to standard gauge, with the project to be combined with the Wodonga Rail Bypass away from the Wodonga CBD. Three V/Line passenger locomotives and 15 passenger carriages were also to be converted to standard gauge to operate the service. Although the project was planned for completion by 2010, it was not finished until the end of June 2011. While the gauge conversion program was being carried out, all Albury services operated as road coaches north of Seymour, connecting with trains operating between Seymour and Melbourne. 68 seats on the NSW TrainLink Melbourne-Sydney XPT service were also made available at V/Line ticket prices.

Rail services on standard gauge commenced on 26 June 2011 with one service each way each day between Albury and Melbourne. A second daily train service was added from 31 October, with a third daily service commencing operations 22 April 2012, marking the end of road coach replacements on the line. However, serious problems soon emerged with the condition of the standard gauge track north of Seymour, meaning that the new service became very unreliable due to speed restrictions, and trains were regularly replaced by buses.

==== Regional Rail Revival ====
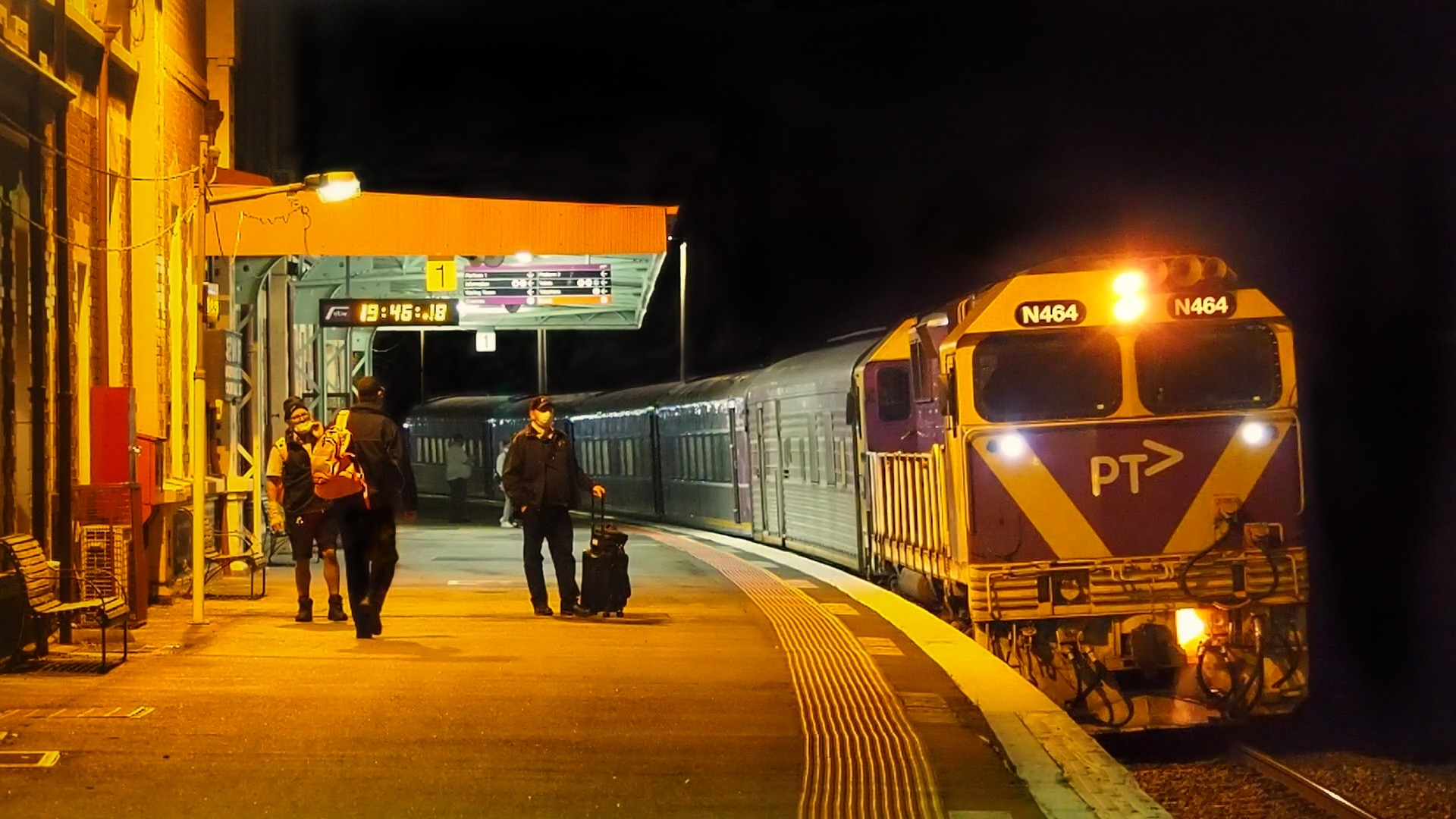
N464 at Seymour leading the last regular locomotive-hauled service from Albury on 30 July 2022.

The North East Line Upgrade was completed in December 2020 as part of the Regional Rail Revival Program. Upgrades included track resurfacing, rail bridge upgrades, renewal of track turnouts at Violet Town and Seymour, a number of level crossing closures and upgrades, and upgrades to train stabling and accessibility at Albury station etc. VLocity DMUs began running on the line on 30 December 2021. The final scheduled locomotive-hauled service on the Albury line ran on 30 July 2022, and was led by V/Lines N class locomotive N464. A new train timetable was introduced on 28 August 2022 with shorter journey times on all services.

== Network and operations ==
=== Routes ===
Interactive map of the Albury service in north eastern Victoria.

From Southern Cross railway station, the service runs through Melbourne Yard, then along the South Kensington–West Footscray railway line, the Albion–Jacana railway line, and then the North East line from Jacana station (where it does not stop) to Albury station. The entire route is along the Sydney–Melbourne rail corridor.

The line serves 12 stations across 304.9 kilometres (189.5 mi) of track. All stations are at ground level and within Victoria, with one station (Albury station) located in the neighbouring state of New South Wales.

Station	Accessibility	Opened	Terrain	Train connections	Other connections
Southern Cross	Yes—step free access	1859	Ground level	27 connections: Alamein line; Ararat line; Ballarat line; Belgrave line; Bendigo line; Craigieburn line; Cranbourne line; Echuca line; Flemington Racecourse line; Geelong line; Gippsland line; Glen Waverley line; Hurstbridge line; Lilydale line; Maryborough line; Mernda line; NSW TrainLink Southern; Pakenham line; Seymour line; Shepparton line; Sunbury line; Swan Hill line; The Overland; Upfield line; Warrnambool line; Werribee line; Williamstown line	Trams Buses Coaches SkyBus
Broadmeadows	Yes—step free access	1873	Ground level	4 connections: Craigieburn line; NSW TrainLink Southern; Seymour line; Shepparton line	Buses
Seymour	Yes—step free access	1872	Ground level	3 connections: NSW TrainLink Southern; Seymour line; Shepparton line	Buses Coaches
Avenel	No—steep ramp	1872	Ground level		
Euroa	Yes—step free access	1873	Ground level		Buses Coaches
Violet Town	Yes—step free access	1873	Ground level		
Benalla	Yes—step free access	1873	Ground level	1 connection: NSW TrainLink Southern	Buses Coaches
Wangaratta	No—steep ramp	1873	Ground level	1 connection: NSW TrainLink Southern	Buses Coaches
Springhurst	No—steep ramp	1873	Ground level		Coaches
Chiltern	No—steep ramp	1873	Ground level		Coaches
Wodonga	Yes—step free access	1873	Ground level		Coaches
Albury	No—steep ramp	1883	Ground level	1 connection: NSW TrainLink Southern	Coaches NSW buses

=== Services ===
V/Line operates three daily passenger trains in each direction on the full length from Southern Cross station in Melbourne to Albury station in New South Wales. Services run express and parallel to the Seymour and Shepparton V/Line services between Broadmeadows and Seymour stations. Services also do not stop between Southern Cross and Broadmeadows.

At other times, V/Line coaches also provide alternative connections between Seymour, Wangaratta and Albury.

=== On-board amenities ===
The Albury service is classified by V/Line as a long-distance service and is run by six dedicated standard gauge VLocity sets, built specifically for the Albury line service. Each VLocity set consist of three carriages and accommodates 164 seats in a 2+2 configuration, six accessible spaces and storage for up to six bicycles. Toilets and luggage racks are available in addition to other amenities. The middle carriage is a buffet car, meaning cafe facilities are also available on-board all Albury services.

The new VLocity sets had no first class cars when they were first introduced. The lack of first class became irrelevant with the introduction of daily fare caps in March 2023 which removed any differentiation between first class and economy class seating.

Before the VLocity sets were introduced, the service was locomotive hauled. Each individual carriage accommodated 74 seats in a 2+2 configuration, with each train set having two passenger cars and a cafe car.

=== Operators ===
Prior to V/Line taking back operation of the Albury service from National Express in 2002, there had been 5 previous operators. The majority of operations on the line have been government run, with these operators including the Victorian Railways, the State Transport Authority, and the Public Transport Corporation.

Operator	Assumed operations	Ceased operations	Length of operations
Victorian Railways	18 April 1872	30 June 1983	111 years
State Transport Authority (V/Line)	1 July 1983	30 June 1989	5 years
Public Transport Corporation (V/Line)	1 July 1989	1995	6 years
Public Transport Corporation (V/Line Passenger)	1995	30 June 1998	31 months
V/Line Passenger	1 July 1998	29 August 1999	13 months
National Express Group (as V/Line Passenger)	29 August 1999	22 December 2002	3 years
V/Line Passenger	22 December 2002	1 July 2010	7 years
V/Line	1 July 2010	incumbent	16 years (ongoing)

=== Accessibility ===
In compliance with the Disability Discrimination Act of 1992, all stations that are new-built or rebuilt are fully accessible and comply with these guidelines. The majority of stations on the corridor are fully accessible, however, there are some stations that haven't been upgraded to meet these guidelines. These stations do feature ramps, however, they have a gradient greater than 1 in 14. Stations that are fully accessible feature ramps that have a gradient less than 1 in 14, have at-grade paths, or feature lifts. These stations typically also feature tactile boarding indicators, independent boarding ramps, wheelchair accessible myki barriers, hearing loops, and widened paths.

Projects improving station accessibility have included the Regional Rail Revival (RRL) program, which involves station rebuilds and upgrades. These works have made significant strides in improving network accessibility, with more than 58% of the stations on the line classed as fully accessible. This number is expected to grow within the coming years as works progress on the RRL.
