= Albury railway station =

Railway station in New South Wales, Australia

Albury
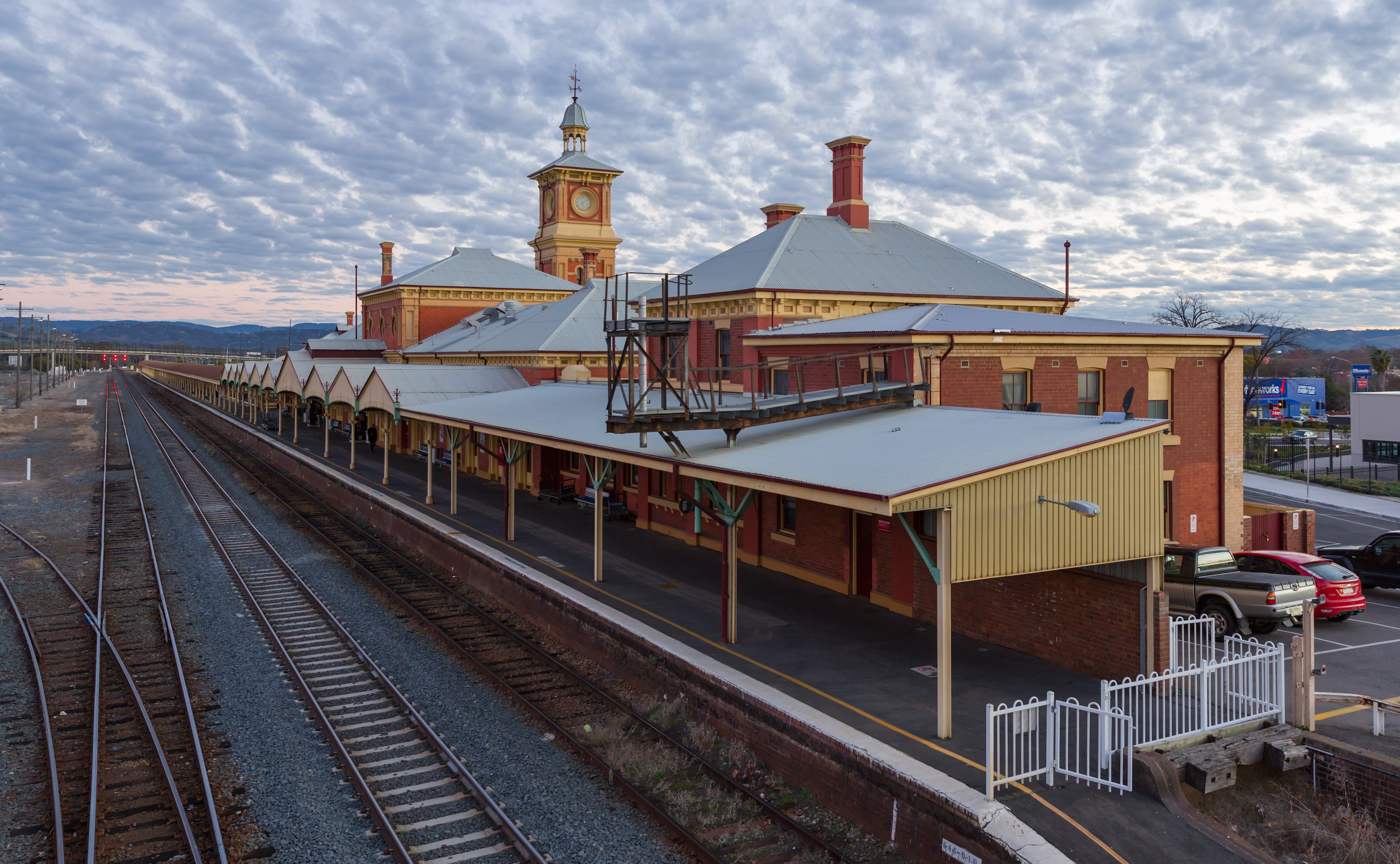
- Station building and platform, July 2015

General information
- Location: Railway Place, East Albury, New South Wales; Australia
- Coordinates: 36°05′02″S 146°55′28″E
- Elevation: 163 metres (534 ft)
- Owner: Transport Asset Manager of New South Wales
- Operator: NSW TrainLink; V/Line
- Lines: Albury (North East, Victoria); Southern (Main Southern, NSW)
- Distance: 642.40 km (399.17 mi) from Central; 304.90 km (189.46 mi) from Southern Cross
- Platforms: 2 (1 side, 1 dock)
- Tracks: 7
- Connections: Bus; Coach; V/Line Coach

Construction
- Structure type: Ground
- Accessible: Yes

Other information
- Status: Staffed
- Station code: NSW: ABX; Vic: ALY
- Fare zone: Myki zone 28
- Website: Transport for NSW; Public Transport Victoria

History
- Opened: 26 February 1882; 144 years ago

Services
Preceding station	NSW TrainLink	Following station
Wangaratta towards Melbourne	NSW TrainLink Southern Line Melbourne XPT	Culcairn towards Sydney
Preceding station	V/Line	Following station
Wodonga towards Southern Cross	Albury line	Terminus
Former services
Preceding station	Former services	Following station
Former NSW Main line service
Terminus	Main Southern Line	Albury Racecourse towards Sydney

Australian National Heritage List
- Official name: Albury Railway Station and Yard
- Type: Historic
- Criteria: a., d., f., h.
- Designated: c. 2012
- Reference no.: 105912

New South Wales Heritage Register
- Official name: Albury Railway Station and yard group
- Type: Complex / group
- Criteria: a., b., c., d., g.
- Designated: 2 April 1999
- Reference no.: 01073
Location
- Location within New South Wales

Albury railway station is a heritage-listed railway station at Railway Place, Albury, New South Wales, Australia, adjacent to the border with Victoria, in Australia. It was designed under the direction of John Whitton and built from 1880 to 1881. It was added to the New South Wales State Heritage Register in 1999.

== History ==
The railway precinct at Albury was the terminus for the Main Southern Line from 1881 until 1962. It remains as an operational railway yard and passenger station and is the last station before the NSW/Victoria border.

By the late 19th century, colonial rivalry between Victoria and NSW, particularly with regard to the competition for wool trade from the Riverina, was the catalyst for the rapid expansion of rail networks in both states in the direction of the Victoria/NSW border. In Victoria, a proposal for a line to Belvoir (Wodonga) was approved in 1869 and completed by 1873. In April 1873, John Sutherland, the Minister for Public Works, set out a policy to complete "the main trunk railways". The policy included the Great Southern Line and was in response to the threat that wool from the Riverina and the west would be diverted to Melbourne via river boats and the Victorian railway. By 1877, the Great Southern Railway extended from Sydney to as far as Cootamundra and rapidly continued on to Bethungra (1878), Junee (1878), Bomen (1878), Wagga Wagga (1879), and Gerogery (1880).

The construction contract for the Wagga Wagga to Albury section was awarded to George Cornwell & F. Mixner on 14 February 1878. The single line opened from Gerogery to Albury on 3 February 1881. The line finally reached the border with the extension across the Murray River on 14 June 1883 as a single track, the contract being awarded to Alex Frew on 1 May 1882.

The station and yard at Albury opened with a loop, stockyards, toilet, wool stage and a temporary platform on 1 March 1881. Albury and Wodonga were both used as change stations, with the interchange of passengers and goods to take place at Albury and livestock at Wodonga.

A contract for construction of a temporary station building, crew barracks, porters' cottages, Station Master's residence, and carriage shed at Albury was let to a J. Stevens in May 1880. In 1882, a 10 tonne crane and a cart weighbridge were installed, the temporary passenger platform converted to a loading stage, and the signal box moved from the temporary platform to a new location near the station.

On 26 February 1882, the new station building was opened. Designed in an Italianate style under the direction of John Whitton, the grandeur of the new building stood as a symbol of NSW's colonial pride. The premiers of both New South Wales and Victoria attended the official opening of the 1881 station, marking the first time in Australian history that two colonial premiers had appeared together publicly.

The New South Wales Government Railways were built to the standard gauge, which meant travellers in both directions had to change trains at Albury. This resulted in a 455-metre-long (1,493 ft) platform being built to accommodate that move, then the longest in Australia.

Early changes to the station precinct included construction of refreshment rooms, a goods shed and a temporary customs office in 1883, and an engine shed, new covered platform and new goods shed in 1884. In 1887, the station and southern end of the yard were interlocked and the southern yard remodelled. Other changes at Albury in the late 19th century included alterations to the barracks (1890), provision of a furnace for heating foot warmers (1890), provision of a special booking office on the platform for sleeping berth tickets for passengers from Victorian trains (1890), new drivers' barracks (1890), interlocking of the North Yard (1891), and the extension of the platform (1892 and 1902).

A contract for the construction of an engine shed, turntable pit, and coal stage was let to A. Frew in October 1880, with the original engine shed built as a two-track structure with the capacity to accommodate eight locomotives. The original 15.240m turntable was increased in size to 18.288m in 1904 and then to 22.860m in 1926. A coal stage was introduced in c. 1950.

Numerous changes were made to the station and yard in the 20th century, with some of the major alterations or additions including extension of the carriage shed (1905), extension of the platform and awning at the Country (southern) end (1907), erection of an additional carriage shed (1912), provision of an Institute building (1921), and extension of the awning (1944).

Major improvements were made to railway infrastructure at Albury and Wodonga during, and immediately prior to, World War II. The importance of improving railway links between states had been understood by military planners since Federation and became more acute after Japan entered World War II. The threat posed to coastal shipping by enemy ships and submarines, combined with restrictions on petrol and rubber, made rail transport increasingly important during the war. Rail traffic (for civilian and military purposes) increased significantly between Victoria and NSW during World War II with the number of passengers at Albury trebling from 1938 to 1941 and goods traffic increasing from 25,000 to 123,000 tonnes during the same period. The increased volume of traffic and the military presence at the border had significant implications for Albury with the Australian defence forces virtually commandeering the station for the duration of World War II.

Many changes were made to the station precinct and goods yard at Albury prior to and during World War II. Some of the major changes included the addition of a timber transhipment platform, lengthening of the station platform by 66m, and expansion of the goods yard on the western side of Parkinson Street. The railway transhipment platform remained in use after the war but activity within the Albury yard declined as road transport gradually displaced rail transport in the second half of the 20th century. Another important change was the introduction of standard gauge track between Wodonga and Melbourne in 1961, reducing the need for transhipment facilities at Albury, although not entirely as the transhipment platform remained in use after the introduction of standard gauge in Victoria. However, by the 1970s and 1980s some of the transhipment facilities at Albury were demolished (including the goods shed, wool depot and engine house) .

In April 1962, a new standard gauge line to Melbourne's Spencer Street station opened, and thus the Intercapital Daylight, Southern Aurora and Spirit of Progress began to operate without the need to change trains. However, the Riverina Express continued to terminate at Albury until November 1993, with passengers transferring to V/Line services to continue into Victoria.

The refreshment room closed in August 1975. The gatekeeper's residence was demolished in 1984 and the Institute building demolished in 1986. Railway residences at 528–538 Young Street and the railway barracks at 540 Young street were sold to private ownershipc. 1991 and are no longer heritage listed. Conservation works were undertaken to the main station building in 1995. The goods shed, tripod crane and various other buildings and structures in the northern yard were demolished prior to 2000

The construction of the Hume Highway bypass in 2005 and 2006 involved the demolition of the Wilson Street footbridge and Dean Street overbridge, and modifications to the eastern end of the footbridge at the station.

== Description ==
=== Station Building (1881) ===
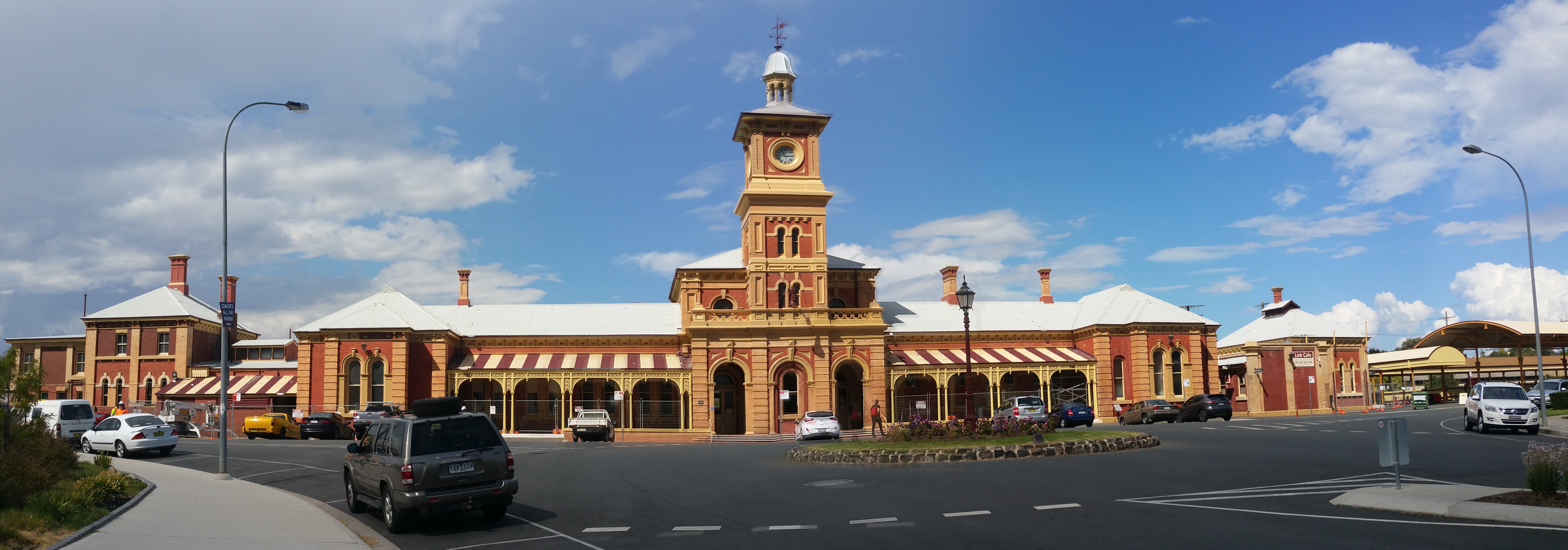
The station building

A grand symmetrical Victorian Italianate style station building with a tall central tower topped with a decorative cupola. The building features load bearing brickwork with face brick and stuccoed and painted detail for pilasters, arches, quoins, pediments, string courses and architraves. The building has a pitched roof with hipped ends and hipped transverse bays at the ends of the building. The roof over the booking hall is elevated. The road-side of the building features the clock tower and two verandahs between the projecting bays supported on double cast iron columns. The platform side has a series of gabled roofs running at right angles to the main building; all supported on trusses over cast iron, decorated, fluted columns. Timber valances are still intact on the exterior of the building. The awning over the platform extension at the south end is of later design than the station building awning. The platform is covered for its entire length (and with Flinders St, Melbourne is the longest platform in Australia) .

Internally the building is arranged along the platform with a central booking hall and ticket office which contains most of its original cedar detailing and panelling. Opening off this space are a number of offices. Along the platform there is access to the ladies waiting room (divided into first and second class sections), the parcels office (also accessed from the street), stores, porters room, lamp room and male toilets. The stores and toilets are separated from the main building by a passageway and are under separate hipped roofs with dormer gables.

A refreshment room was added to the station building in the 1880s at the Sydney end of the main building and in a similar style to the main building. It has a separate awning structure of later construction which extends beyond the station building. Also the north end of the building has been extended by the addition of a second storey to provide additional accommodation space for the refreshment rooms.

=== Station Master's Residence (1881) ===
A large two-storey brick residence with a slate gabled roof. The building has an asymmetrical design with a projecting bay at the front and a two-storey verandah with decorative cast iron railing and detail to posts. The verandah roof is reverse curve corrugated iron. The arrangement of the building includes a sitting room and dining room with staircase in the front part of the ground floor area with attached kitchen, scullery and pantry at the rear. Upstairs there are two large bedrooms, one with closet, two smaller bedrooms, all with fireplaces and one very small bedroom under a lower roof, probably for a servant or used as a study.

=== Other station infrastructure ===
Heritage-listed infrastructure at the station also includes:

- Signal Box – elevated brick and timber with gabled roof located opposite platform (1885)
- Signal Box – brick, located at southern end of platform (1962)
- Station Master's residence – two-storey located at Railway Place (1881)
- Barracks, brick engine drivers' barracks at 508 Young Street (c. 1890)
- Footbridge at northern end of platform
- Turntable
- Transhipment Shed (covered with central platform, c. 1920).
- Gantry cranes
- Broad gauge cripple sidings located in dock platform (interpretive display)

=== Condition ===
As at 19 July 2013, the station buildings are in very good condition. Other structures are generally in good condition with some repairs required to the signal box and transhipment shed.

The station buildings, signal box and Station Master's residence have a high level of integrity/intactness.

== Platforms and services ==
Albury is served by NSW TrainLink XPT services from Sydney Central to Melbourne Southern Cross services and terminating V/Line services to and from Melbourne Southern Cross.

Platform	Line	Stopping pattern	Notes
1	Southern Region	Services to Melbourne and Sydney	
2	V/Line Albury line	Services to & from Melbourne	

== Transport links ==
Greyhound Australia operates two services in both directions between Canberra and Melbourne, via Albury station.

NSW TrainLink operates road coach services from Albury station to Echuca.

V/Line operates road coach services from Albury station to Kerang, Adelaide, Canberra, Seymour and Wangaratta.

FlixBus operates road coach services from Albury station to Sydney and Melbourne.

== Heritage listings ==
The railway station, initially entered onto the now defunct Register of the National Estate on 21 March 1978, was transferred to the Australian National Heritage List on its establishment in 2012 and its scope widened to include the station and its associated yards with the following statement of significance:

Albury Railway Station and Yard was particularly important in the movement towards Federation and in the defence of the nation during the Second World War.

The built fabric at the site is an historical record of outstanding importance as a tangible expression of how the Australian nation was forged with the bringing together of sovereign colonies. It demonstrates the notions of colonial division and convergence that underlay, first, the negotiation and, then, the further working out of the federal compact. The connection of the New South Wales and Victorian railway systems at Albury-Wodonga gave a dramatic boost to the cause of Federation. The connection was a long-heralded and much-vaunted engineering achievement, which was crowned with the architectural triumph of Albury Railway Station Building. The connection was, above all else, a political accomplishment, and was perceived as marking a turning point in the movement towards Federation. It provided a tangible and inspirational expression of what might develop into a railwayed nation continent. Contemporaries hoped the connection would encourage the bond of commerce and lead to revision of ungainly trading arrangements. It would, they hoped, help overcome colonial rivalries and jealousies by increasing communication and understanding. It would assist the colonies to defend themselves. Historians have subsequently built on the rhetoric of the time to confirm the importance of establishing the rail link. It is still symbolic that the concepts of national unity in Australia did not receive any dramatic boost until the driving-in of the last spike in the Sydney Melbourne railway at Albury on the border of our two dominant colonies. The Station Building was, and is, interpreted as an expression of the sense of accomplishment felt by its designer, John Whitton, in having reached the southernmost point in the network of railways throughout New South Wales that he had established as railway Engineer-in-Chief. It was a monumental border marker: a palpable indicator that New South Wales, with this railway, was reclaiming the trade of the border district.

At the same time, the Yard was designed to facilitate the interchange of goods and passenger traffic arriving on different railway gauges. The sets of two-gauged railway lines in the Yard point to the competing interests of two most populous colonies. The persistence of the two gauges beyond Federation points to the difficulties sovereign colonies had in reconciling differences. Subsequent changes to the Yard illustrate shifts in interstate relations as well as improvements in transhipment processes, especially in times of war. They demonstrate the eventual emergence of a national economy with the introduction of standard gauge and, more recently, the development of a single national freight network. The break-of-gauge was a strategically important as an impediment when Japanese submarine activity virtually halted coastal shipping, and the nation prepared to resist a possible invasion during the Second World War. The people involved in transhipment activities related to moving munitions, goods and passengers at Albury Railway Station and Yard played an important part in fighting the home front Battle of Albury. Russell Drysdales pictures of the Albury Railway Station during the Second World War have entered the national imagination of home front perceptions of the menace of war in 1942 and 1943, just as surely as his pictures of the 1944 drought shaped the national imagination of the outback. Albury Railway Station and Yard developed as a significant punctuation point on a national route. There was no other transport connection like it in scale or character in regional Australia. The long passenger platform was familiar to generations of train travellers. Illustrative materials in addition to Drysdales works indicate a high level of regard for the site and rail connection as national cultural capital.

Albury Railway Station and Yard provides an exceptional explanation of the political character of Australia before and after Federation, and, through the artworks it inspired, provides a powerful evocation of the nature of the home front during the direst times of the Second World War.

— Statement of significance, Australian National Heritage List.

On 2 April 1999, the Victorian Italianate railway station, signal box and station master's residence were collectively listed on the New South Wales State Heritage Register with the following statement of significance:

The railway precinct at Albury is of state significance as one of the major railway precincts in NSW which includes one of the most prominent station buildings in NSW. The grandeur of the station building at Albury reflects the importance attributed to this location by the NSW government in the late 19th century and reflects important historical themes, particularly the rivalry between NSW and Victoria and the competition for trade between Australia's colonies in the 19th century. The station building, platform and former Station Master’s residence are prominent civic buildings in Albury which, along with less prominent structures (the former barracks building, signal box, transhipment shed and other items) are extant reminders of the important and continuing role of the railways in Albury since the 1880s.

The place is significant as the point at which there was a break-of-gauge between the different gauges used in Victoria and NSW and where, from 1881, the transfer of passengers and goods took place near the border between Victoria and NSW. The railway precinct at Albury was also a significant location during World War II when the transfer of freight and military personnel at Albury made an important contribution to the war effort, particularly through the operation of the transhipment area, where military supplies were loaded and unloaded.

The barracks building at Albury is an excellent, representative example of late 19th century accommodation for railway workers and is one of the oldest remaining railway barracks in NSW. It demonstrates standard late 19th century and 20th century railway practices, namely the accommodation of railway crews at strategic locations throughout the state, and reveals the use of a standard design for rest houses in the late 19th century.

— Statement of significance, New South Wales State Heritage Register.

== Gallery ==
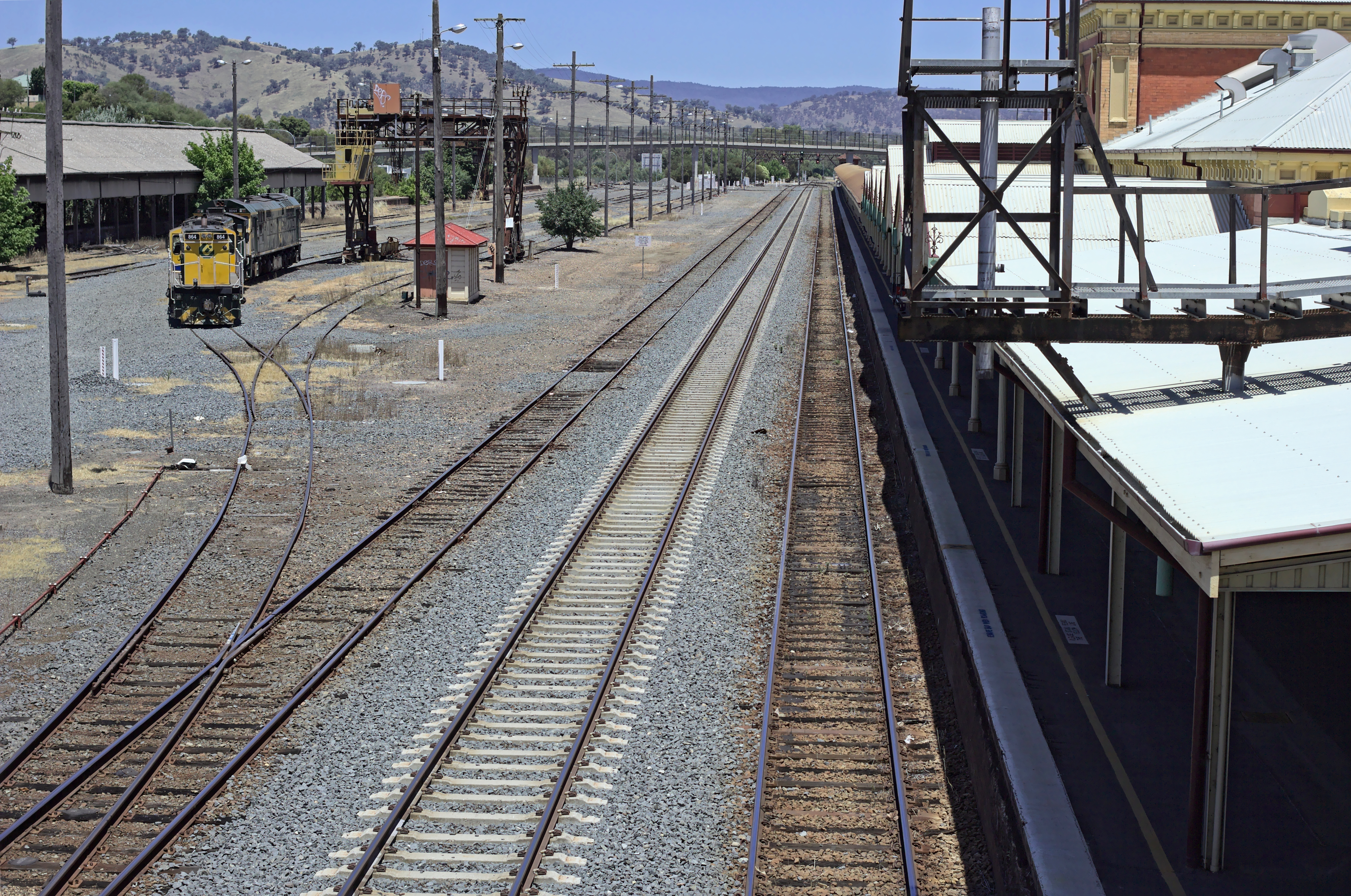
Tracks at Albury railway station, November 2015

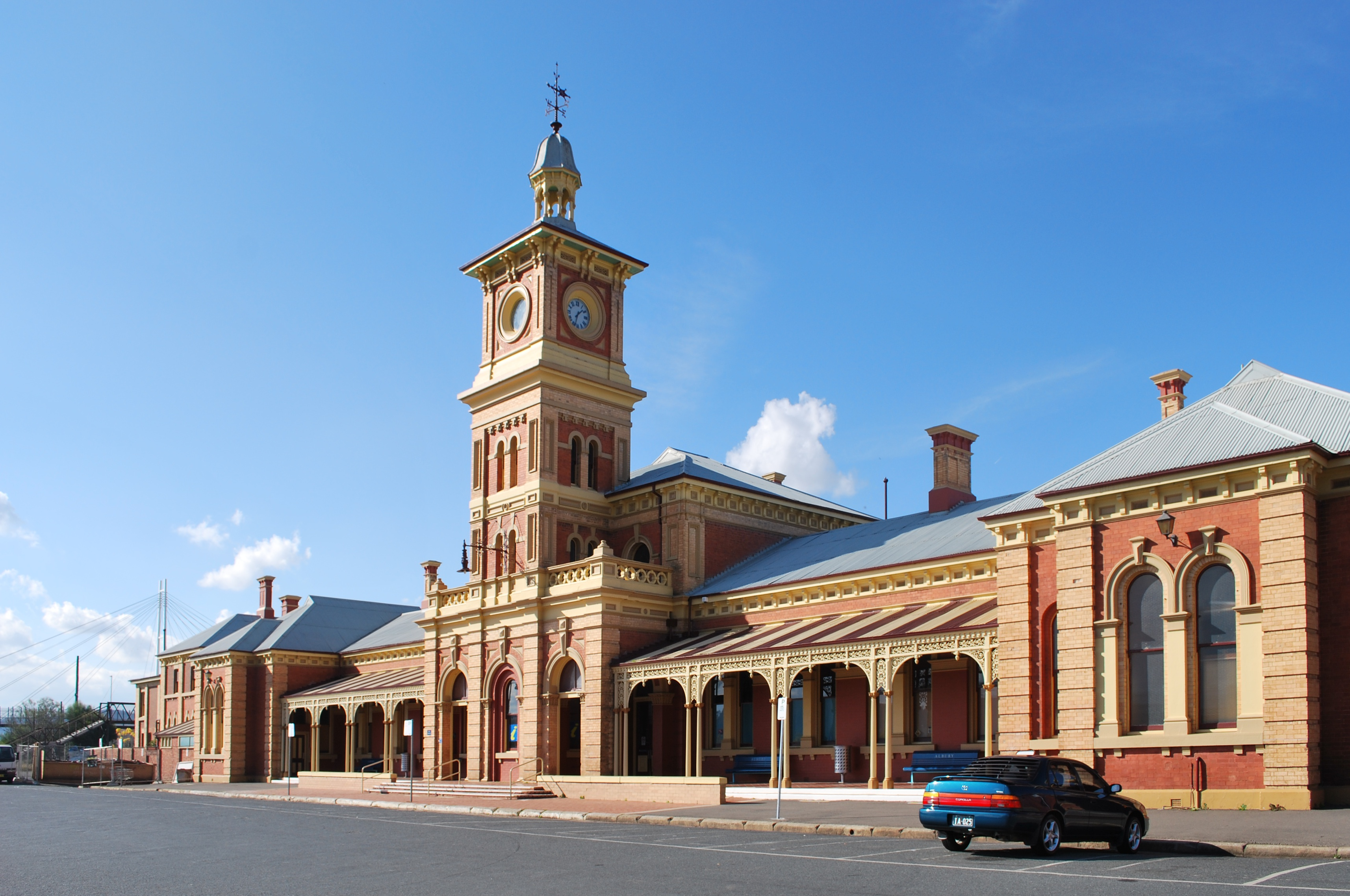
The Victorian Italianate Albury railway station,
May 2010

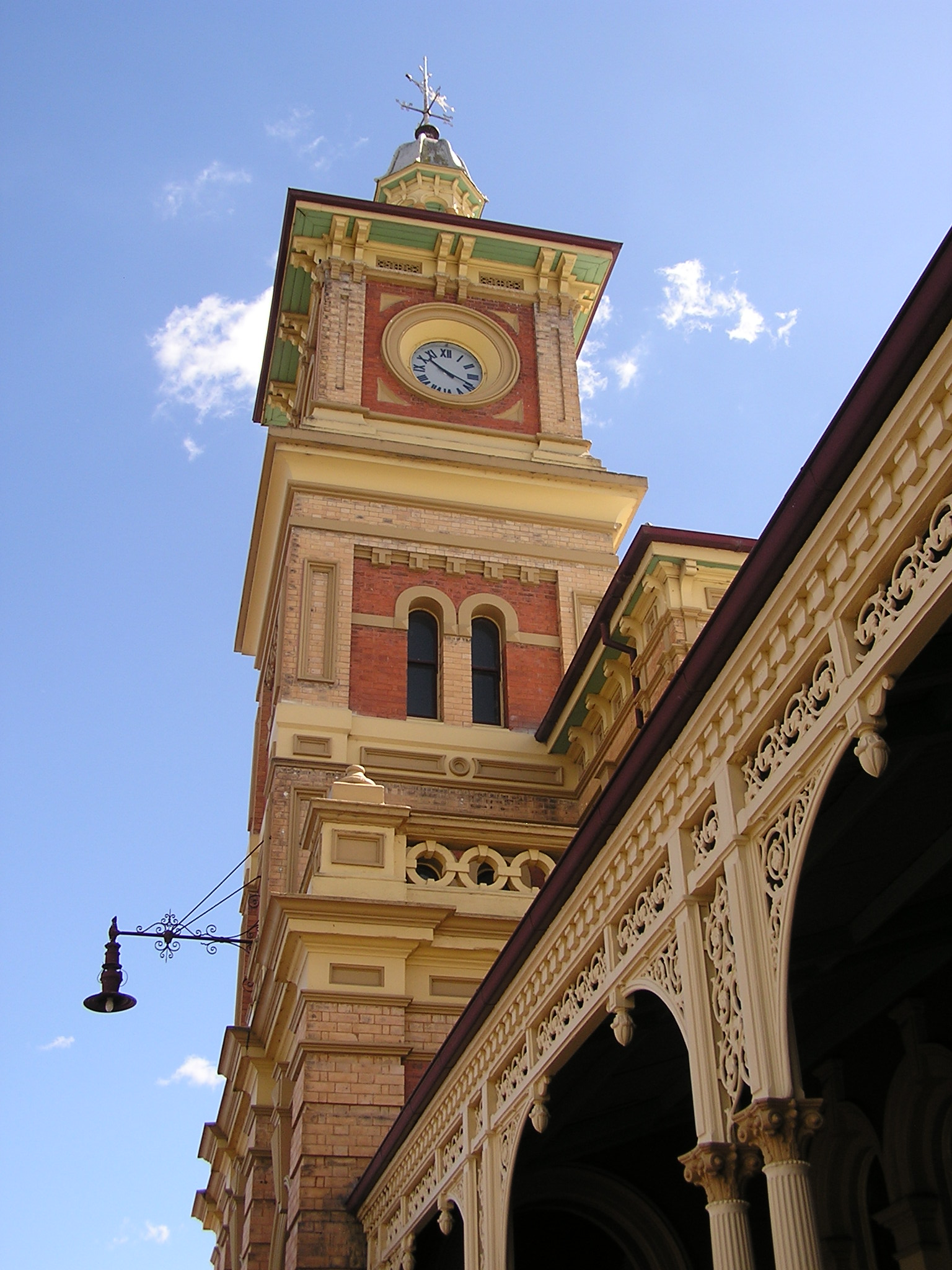
Detail of the station clocktower, 2005

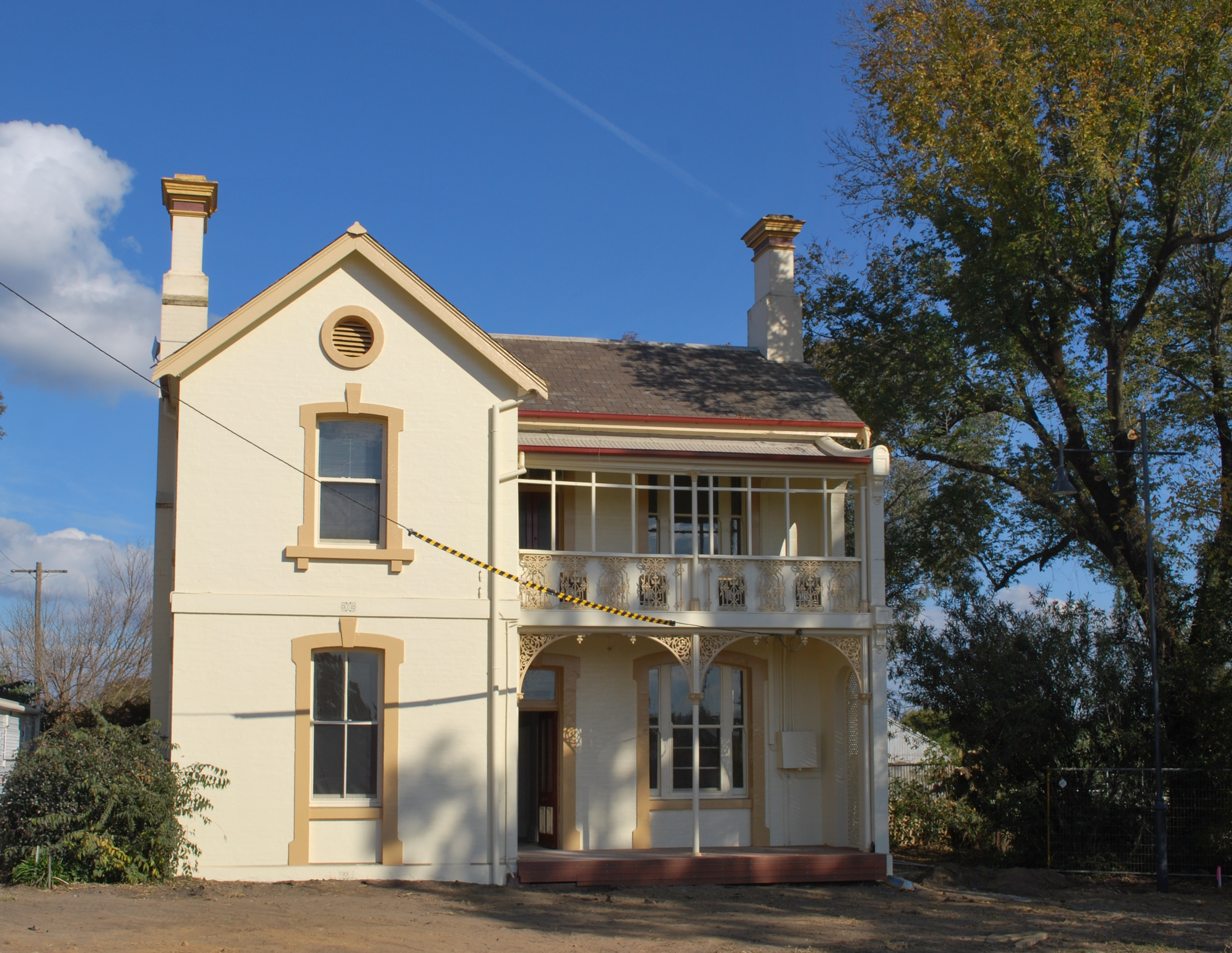
Station Master's Residence, May 2010

== See also ==
- List of regional railway stations in New South Wales
