= Locksley =

Locksley may refer to:

- Locksley, Nottinghamshire, fictional home of English folk hero Robin Hood
- Locksley (band), an American rock band
- Locksley, New South Wales, Australia
- Locksley, Victoria, Australia
- Locksley railway station, Victoria, a closed station in Locksley, Victoria, Australia
- Locksley station (Pennsylvania), a railroad station in Thornbury Township, Pennsylvania, USA
- Locksley Christian School, the former name of Regents Academy based in Lincolnshire, England
- Locksley Hall, an Alfred Lord Tennyson poem
- Mike Locksley (born 1969), American football coach

== See also ==
- Loxley (disambiguation)
