= V/Line N class =

Class of Australian diesel-electric locomotives

V/Line N Class
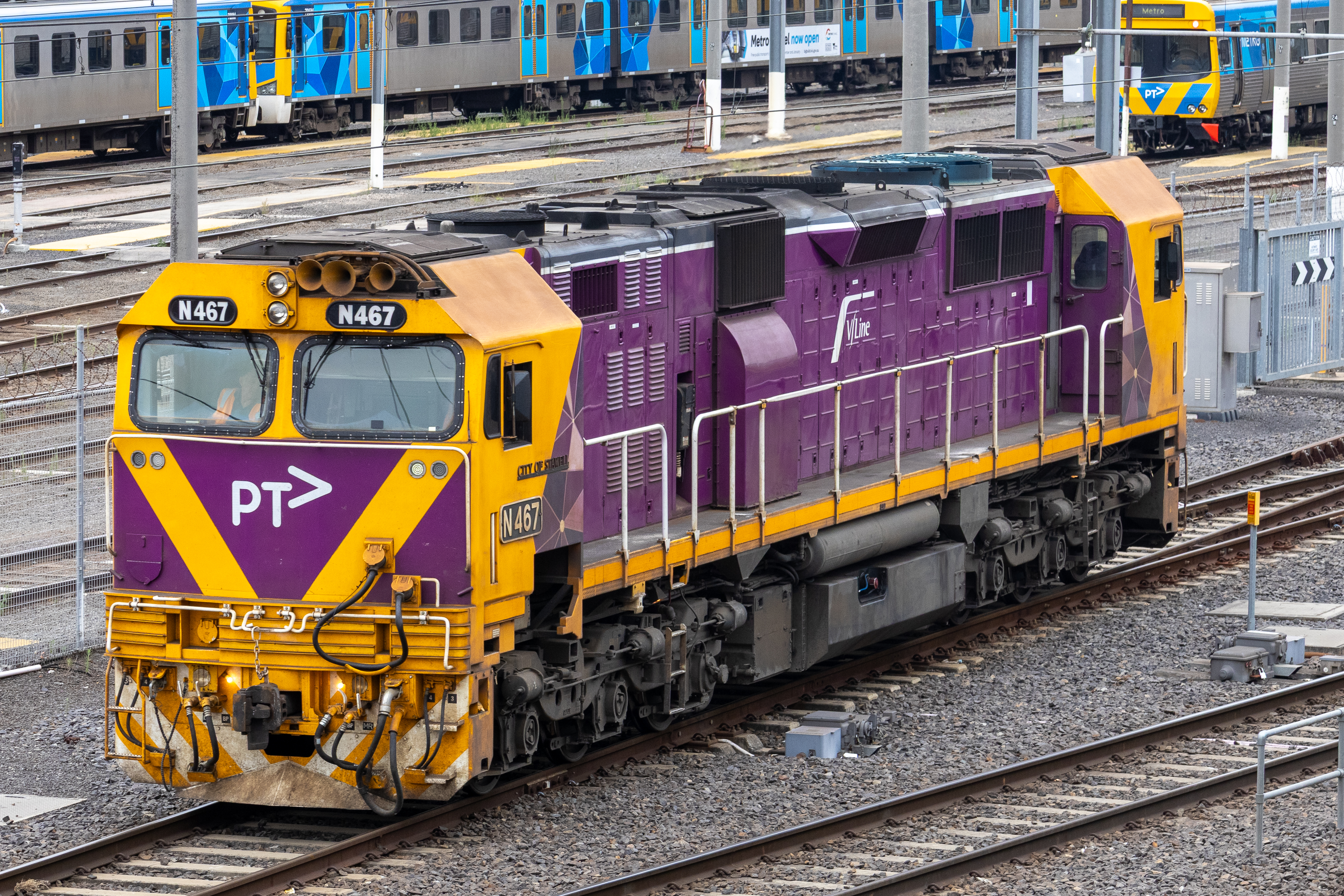
- N Class locomotive N467 near North Melbourne Station, January 2026
Type and origin
- Power type: Diesel-electric
- Builder: Clyde Engineering, Somerton
- Model: EMD JT22HC-2
- Build date: 1985–1987
- Total produced: 25
Specifications
- Configuration
  - UIC: Co-Co
- Gauge: 1,435 mm (4 ft 8 1/2 in), 1,600 mm (5 ft 3 in)
- Length: 18.87 m (61 ft 11 in)
- Loco weight: 123 tonnes (121 long tons; 136 short tons)
- Fuel type: Diesel
- Fuel capacity: 6,800 L (1,500 imp gal; 1,800 US gal)
- Lubricant cap.: 625 L (137 imp gal; 165 US gal)
- Coolant cap.: 882 L (194 imp gal; 233 US gal)
- Prime mover: Order 1: EMD 12-645E3C [N451–N460] Order 2: EMD 12-645E3B [N461–N475]
- RPM range: 300–904
- Engine type: Two-stroke diesel
- Generator: EMD AR10-JJD-D18; Some converted to AR10-CA5
- Traction motors: EMD D77 (Originally built with D43)
Performance figures
- Maximum speed: 130 km/h (81 mph)
- Power output: 1,846 kW (2,476 hp)
- Tractive effort: Starting: 289 kN (65,000 lb_{f}); Continuous: 260 kN (58,000 lb_{f}) at 21 km/h (13 mph)
Career
- Operators: V/Line; SSR
- Number in class: 25
- Numbers: N451–N475
- Nicknames: Dog bones
- First run: 1985
- Current owner: V/Line; SSR
- Disposition: 25 in service

The N Class are a class of diesel locomotives built by Clyde Engineering in Somerton for V/Line in the state of Victoria between 1985 and 1987. Built as a part of the New Deal, the class was meant to replace the ageing B class locomotives.

== History ==
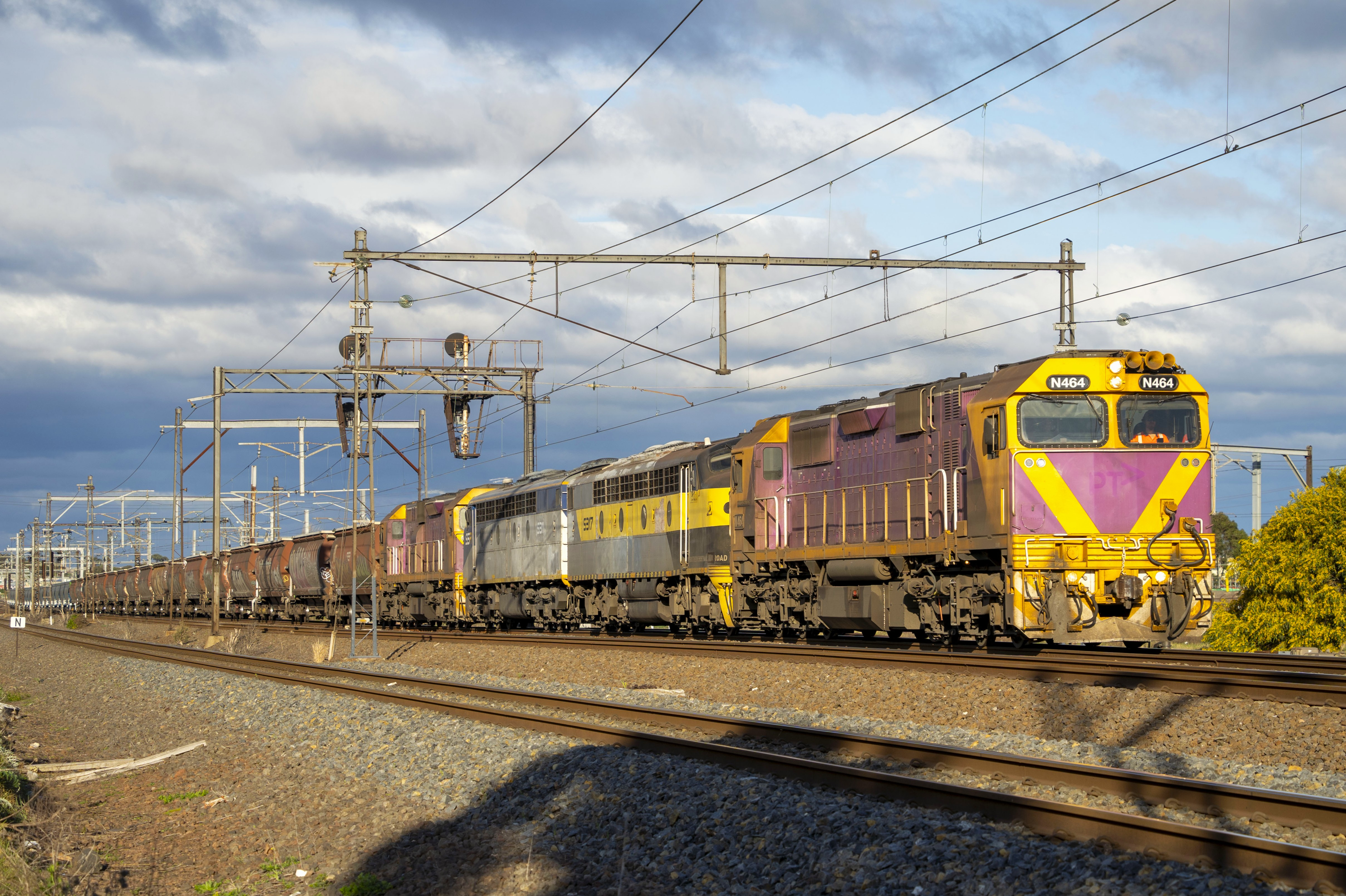
Southern Shorthaul Railroad leased N464 leads an empty grain through Altona Junction in September 2024

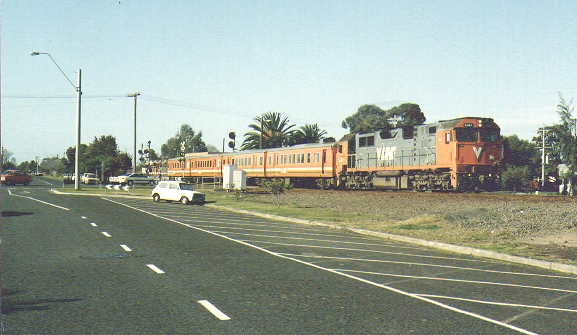
N class in the original orange and grey livery hauling H type carriages at Geelong, 1993

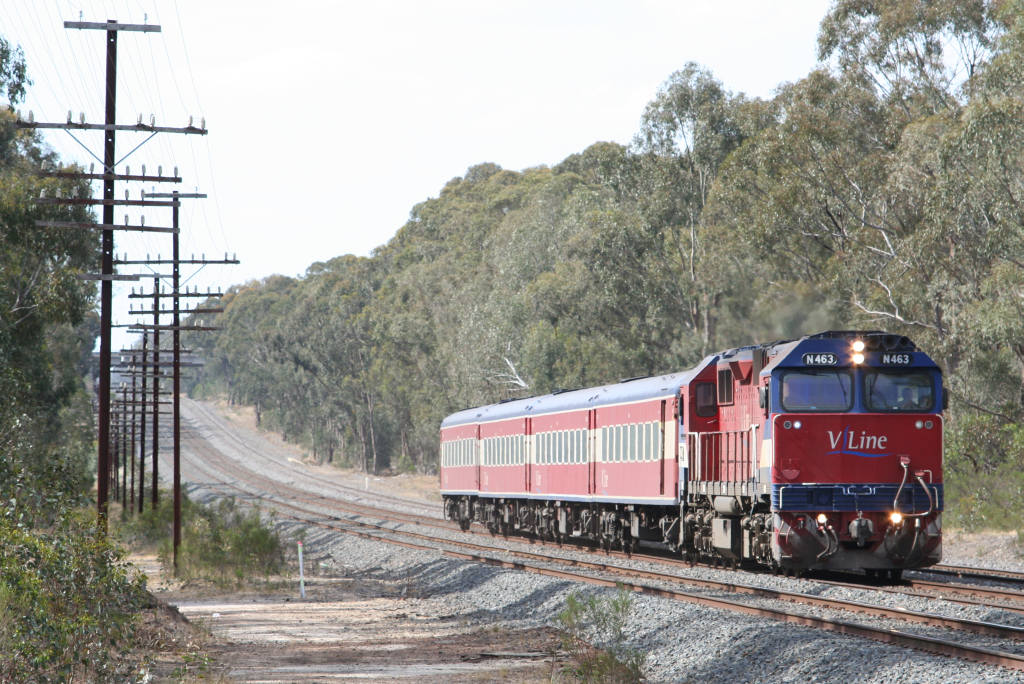
N463 in the 1995 livery hauling N type carriages on the North East line, October 2007

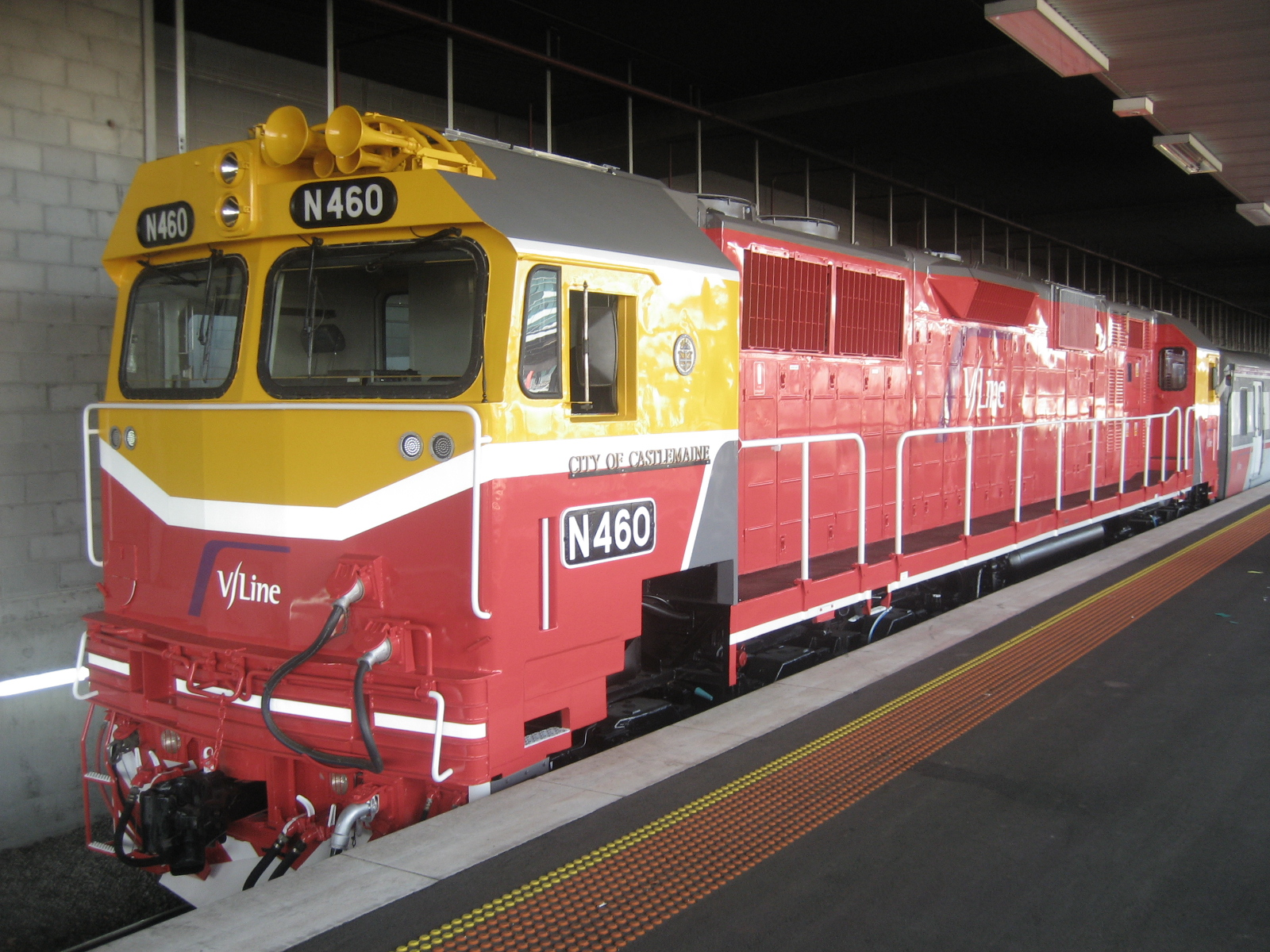
N460 in the 2008 Mk3 livery at Southern Cross, September 2008

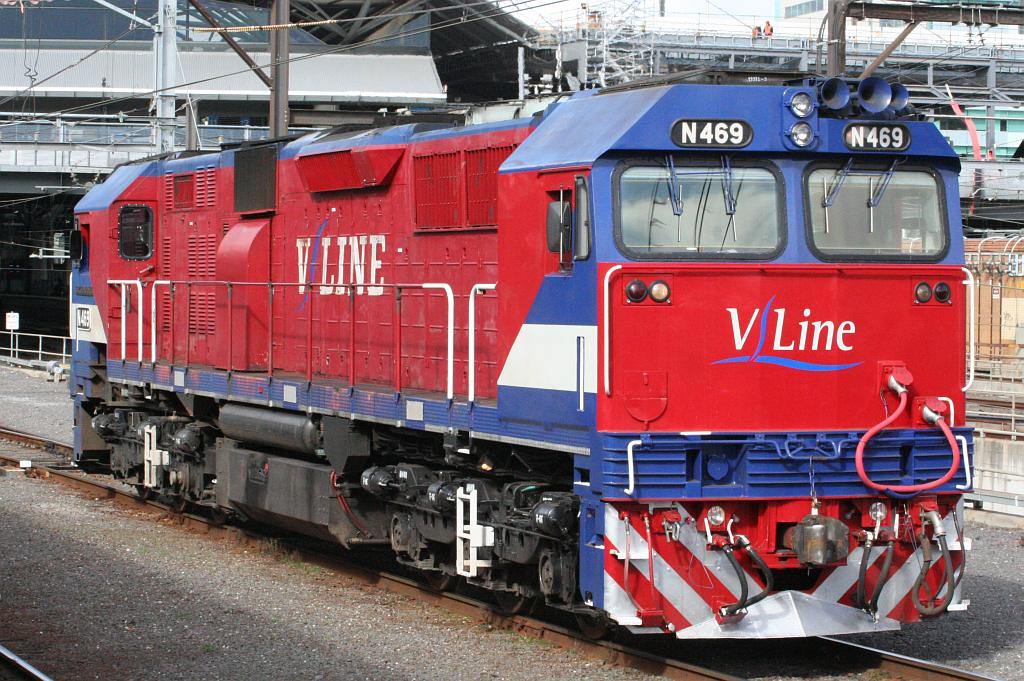
N469 in the 1995 Mk2 livery at Southern Cross, August 2006

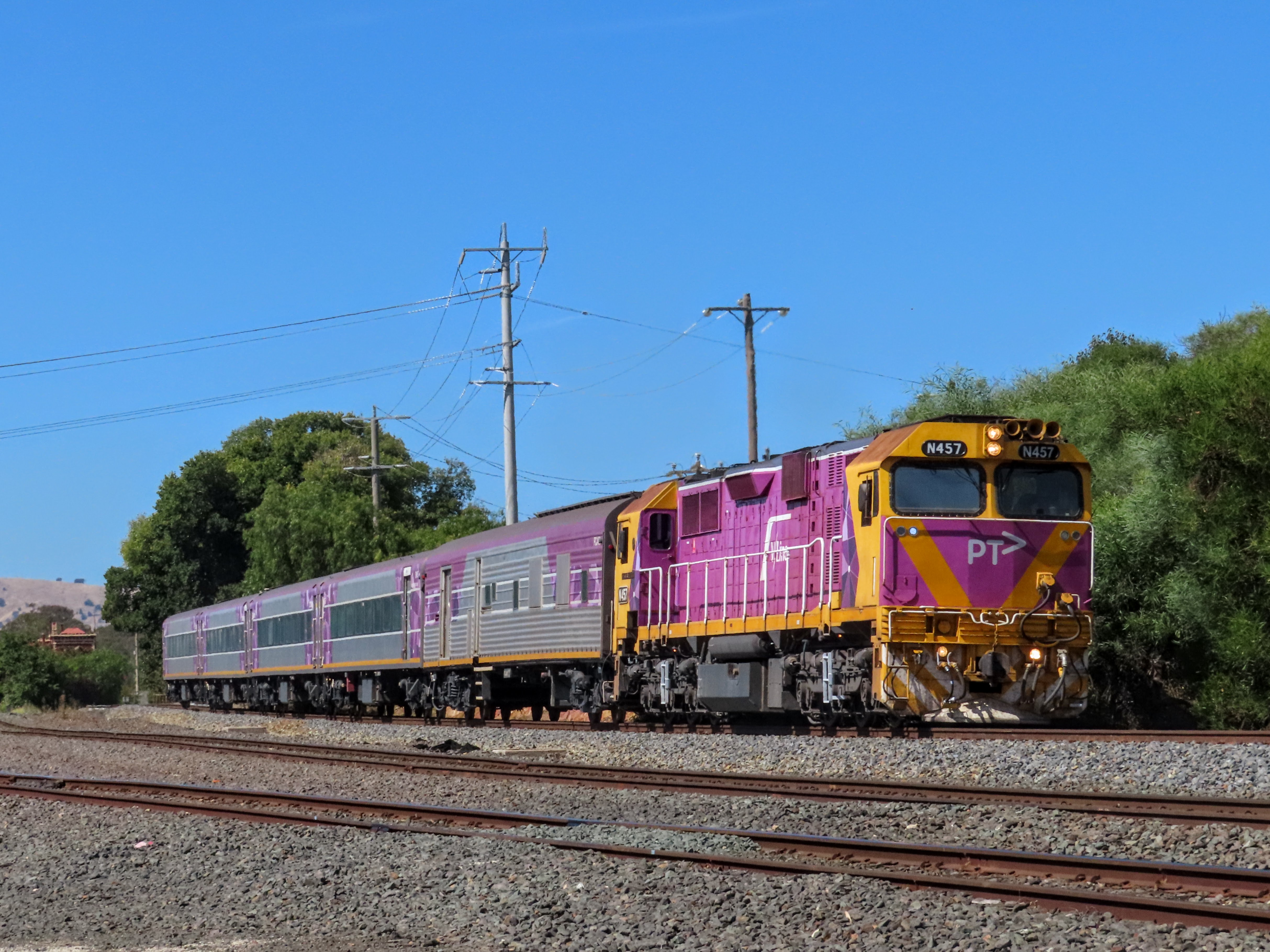
N457 on up Albury Service in the current livery, March 2021

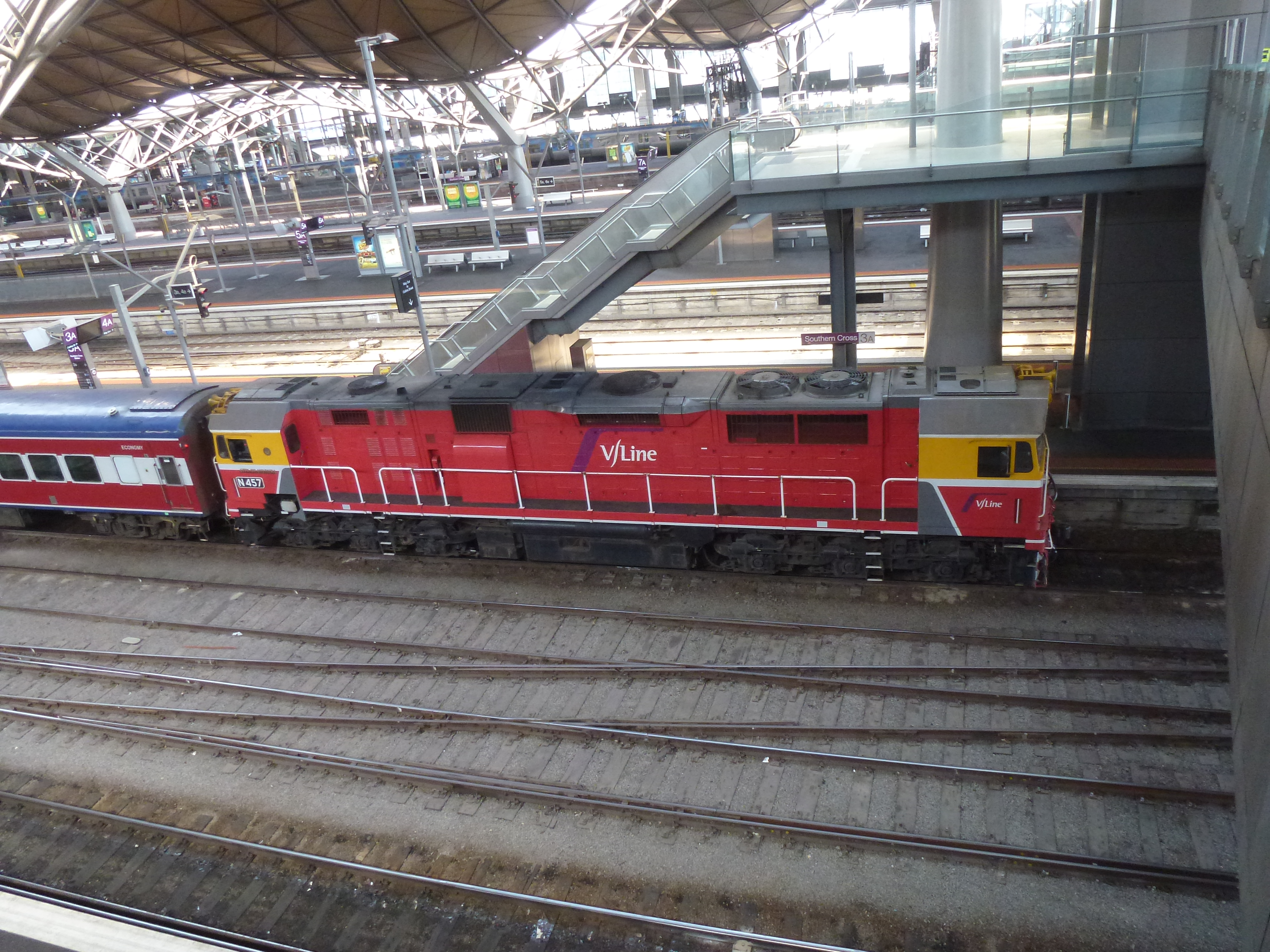
N457, one of the few in the series converted to standard gauge, at Southern Cross, January 2012

By the start of the 1980s, Victorian Railways passenger numbers had fallen to around 3 million per year, due to ageing rolling stock, stagnant timetables and competition from other forms of transport. The Lonie Report of 1980 recommended sweeping cuts to the network, but there was a strong push from the many quarters for the state government to maintain a viable rail network. The government response in February 1981 was the New Deal for Country Passengers, a $115 million commitment to recast country rail passenger services in Victoria.

As part of the New Deal, all B class locomotives were to be re-built as the A class for use on passenger services, and ten new locomotives were ordered. Tenders closed in 1983, with Clyde Engineering being awarded the contract. By mid-1985, the rising cost of the A class conversions led to the project being abandoned after 11 locomotives had been upgraded, and the N class order was increased to 25, using parts intended for the A class conversions.

The N class locomotives entered service on the 1,600 mm (5 ft 3 in) gauge and operated on main lines all over the state, with the exception of the Gippsland line beyond Traralgon, a restriction that was later lifted. The class also saw regular use on The Overland Melbourne to Adelaide overnight service until the train was withdrawn in March 1995 so that the track could be converted to 1,435 mm (4 ft 8 1/2 in) standard gauge. As well as being operated by V/Line, N class locomotives were hired to the Warrnambool line operator, West Coast Railway, from 1993 to 1995, after which its own locomotives became available, and, between 1993 and 2004, to Shepparton line operator Hoys Roadlines.

The first known working of an N class locomotive towards Traralgon was on the 28 June 1986 run of the 8:25 am Bairnsdale passenger service, with N455 leading east-facing S309. N465 was noted running to Leongatha on 16 May 1987; this may not have been the first such instance but it was considered noteworthy at the time.

In preparation for the privatisation of V/Line, the operations of V/Line Freight and V/Line Passenger were split in 1995, with the N class allocated to the passenger operator and included in the sale of V/Line Passenger to National Express in 1999. Before then, N class locomotives had been employed on freight services, restricted to a maximum speed of 90 km/h (56 mph).

During the Regional Fast Rail project, a number of shut-downs were affected passenger services, and N class locomotives were used to haul ballast trains on the Geelong line in 2003 and 2004, as well as being hired to Freight Australia in January 2004 to haul log and grain services. After 2007, class members were also been hired to heritage operator Seymour Railway Heritage Centre for use on its trains, because the provision of TPWS equipment on the locos allowed them to run at full line speed over the Regional Fast Rail network.

With the gradual introduction of VLocity diesel multiple unit trains, N class locomotives began to play a lesser role, their main use being to haul peak-time commuter services to Bacchus Marsh and Geelong, along with long-distance services beyond the Regional Fast Rail network, to Swan Hill, and previously also to Bairnsdale, Warrnambool, and on the standard gauge to Albury. The latter were entirely replaced by VLocity sets from 1 August 2022, the final run on the previous day having been worked by N464.

In March 2024, for the first time since 2004, four N class locomotives were hired to Southern Shorthaul Railroad to haul freight trains. In preparation for leasing to SSR, the PTV and V/Line logos were stripped out. The first freight train with an N Class locomotive was hauled on 16 March 2024 on a grain train. This was followed up in March 2025 by 6 more N class locomotives. It could be expected that the N Class locomotives could replace the aging B Class locomotives in the SSR fleet.

N class locomotives are authorised to operate at 115 km/h (71 mph), although some units have been upgraded with D77/78 traction motors and have a maximum speed of 130 km/h (80 mph). By June 2020, all locomotives had been fitted with the upgraded traction motors.

== Features ==
N class locomotives have a locally designed frame and body, fitted with imported Electro-Motive Division technology in the prime mover, generator and control unit, along with locally produced components such as the bogie frames, constructed by Bradken. The class was the first in the world to use the EMD D43 traction motor, similar to, but smaller than, that used in the C and G classes. Head end power is provided by a separate engine unit in a special compartment located at the number 1 end of the locomotive, behind the electrical cabinet. The 240 kW generator provides 415 V 3-phase AC power for train lighting, air conditioning and other carriage requirements.

Fitted with 6,800-litre fuel tanks, the class were capable of running from Melbourne to Adelaide without refuelling. Electrical and electronic components were modular, to minimise delays after failures, and a reactive muffler system reduced the exhaust noise level. While most of the locomotives have only been used on broad gauge, three were converted to 1,435 mm (4 ft 8 1/2 in) standard gauge by exchanging the wheelsets and repositioning the braking equipment.

The narrow car body provided for a catwalk along each side, between the cabs, with fold-back body panels for maintenance access. The cab is similar to that of the G class locomotives, with an anti-climber beam to prevent upward movement should a collision occur. Twin high-impact windscreens were provided, with dual blade wipers. Each cab had room for a two-person crew, as well as an instructor if required. Air conditioning was provided, as well as an air-operated retention toilet at one end, accessible from the catwalk.

The locos were initially provided with automatic staff exchange equipment which did not work correctly; trials were performed on 16 February 1987 with N470 at Mangalore and Avenel to rectify this. The equipment was removed in the 1990s, after the use of the electric staff ended, although the space remains in the cab side.

The car body design was the basis of one-off locomotive, GML10, built by Clyde Engineering in 1990 for the Goldsworthy railway.

== Livery ==
The N class locomotives were delivered in the V/Line tangerine orange and grey livery, and named after cities in Victoria, except for N453, which is named after the City of Albury in New South Wales. The N class is, therefore, one of only three Australian locomotive classes of which every class member is named. N465 carries the earlier spelling of Ballarat, originally Ballaarat. On 10 March 1987, locomotive N470 was returned to Clyde Engineering, Somerton for a ceremony, at which brass plaques were affixed at both ends under the builder's plates, reading "V/Line locomotive N470 completes 2-million horse-power of diesel electric locomotives built by Clyde Engineering in Australia 10 March 1987".

From 1995, the class members were repainted into the new V/Line red and blue livery, and the V/Line logo on the side was altered after the privatisation of V/Line in 1999. In a program started in 2007, N class locos received white stripes along the cab-fronts, and their cowcatchers were painted yellow, to increase visibility at level crossings.

In May 2008, locomotive N468 was repainted into the new V/Line livery of red with grey, white and yellow. Three of the repainted locos were converted to 1,435 mm (4 ft 8 1/2 in) standard gauge in 2011, following the conversion of the North East line.

On 8 April 2017, N457 made its first revenue run to Albury in the new PTV livery of purple and yellow. That followed the painting of carriage set SN 8 into the new livery to match the V/Locity fleet, and style of the wider fleet of Victorian trams and buses

== Locomotives ==
Locomotive	Name	Serial no.	Traction Motors	Max Speed Km/h	Entered service	Owner	Operator	Gauge	Livery	Notes
N451	City of Portland	85-1219	D77/78	130	20 September 1985	Southern Shorthaul Railroad	Southern Shorthaul Railroad	1,435 mm (4 ft 8½ in) standard gauge	Purple/Yellow 'PTV' with SSR logos	
N452	Rural City of Wodonga	85-1220	D77/78	115	10 October 1985	V/Line Passenger	V/Line Passenger	1,600 mm (5 ft 3 in) broad gauge	Purple/Yellow 'PTV'	
N453	City of Albury	85-1221	D77/78	130	1 November 1985	V/Line Passenger	V/Line Passenger	1,600 mm (5 ft 3 in) broad gauge	Purple/Yellow 'PTV'	
N454	City of Horsham	85-1222	D77/78	130	20 November 1985	V/Line Passenger	Southern Shorthaul Railroad	1,600 mm (5 ft 3 in) broad gauge	Purple/Yellow 'PTV' with SSR logos	
N455	City of Swan Hill	85-1223	D77/78	130	19 December 1985	V/Line Passenger	Southern Shorthaul Railroad	1,600 mm (5 ft 3 in) broad gauge	Purple/Yellow 'PTV'	
N456	City of Colac	85-1224	D77/78	115	29 January 1986	V/Line Passenger	V/Line Passenger	1,600 mm (5 ft 3 in) broad gauge	Purple/Yellow 'PTV'	Stored Geelong
N457	City of Mildura	85-1225	D77/78	130	27 February 1986	V/Line Passenger	Southern Shorthaul Railroad	1,435 mm (4 ft 8½ in) standard gauge	Purple/Yellow 'PTV'	
N458	City of Maryborough	85-1226	D77/78	130	17 March 1986	V/Line Passenger	V/Line Passenger	1,600 mm (5 ft 3 in) broad gauge	Purple/Yellow 'PTV'	
N459	City of Echuca	85-1227	D77/78	130	15 April 1986	V/Line Passenger	V/Line Passenger	1,600 mm (5 ft 3 in) broad gauge	Purple/Yellow 'PTV'	Stored Geelong
N460	City of Castlemaine	85-1228	D77/78	130	15 May 1986	V/Line Passenger	V/Line Passenger	1,600 mm (5 ft 3 in) broad gauge	Purple/Yellow 'PTV'	
N461	City of Ararat	85-1190	D77/78	115	25 July 1986	V/Line Passenger	Southern Shorthaul Railroad	1,600 mm (5 ft 3 in) broad gauge	Purple/Yellow 'PTV'	
N462	City of Shepparton	86-1191	D77/78	115	14 August 1986	V/Line Passenger	V/Line Passenger	1,600 mm (5 ft 3 in) broad gauge	Purple/Yellow 'PTV'	
N463	City of Bendigo	86-1192	D77/78	130	4 September 1986	V/Line Passenger	Southern Shorthaul Railroad	1,600 mm (5 ft 3 in) broad gauge	Purple/Yellow 'PTV'	The locomotive that the runaway Broadmeadows Train collided into and the impact resulted in a crumple near one of the cabs which it still has but this could pre-date the crash
N464	City of Geelong	86-1193	D77/78	130	29 September 1986	V/Line Passenger	Southern Shorthaul Railroad	1,600 mm (5 ft 3 in) broad gauge	Purple/Yellow 'PTV'	
N465	City of Ballaarat	86-1194	D77/78	130	20 October 1986	V/Line Passenger	V/Line Passenger	1,600 mm (5 ft 3 in) broad gauge	Purple/Yellow 'PTV'	Uses traditional spelling of Ballarat
N466	City of Warrnambool	86-1195	D77/78	115	31 October 1986	V/Line Passenger	Southern Shorthaul Railroad	1,600 mm (5 ft 3 in) broad gauge	Purple/Yellow 'PTV' with SSR Logos	
N467	City of Stawell	86-1196	D77/78	130	26 November 1986	V/Line Passenger	V/Line Passenger	1,600 mm (5 ft 3 in) broad gauge	Purple/Yellow 'PTV'	
N468	City of Bairnsdale	86-1197	D77/78	130	19 December 1986	V/Line Passenger	V/Line Passenger	1,600 mm (5 ft 3 in) broad gauge	Purple/Yellow 'PTV'	
N469	City of Morwell	86-1198	D77/78	130	29 January 1987	V/Line Passenger	Southern Shorthaul Railroad	1,435 mm (4 ft 8½ in) standard gauge	Purple/Yellow ‘PTV’	
N470	City of Wangaratta	86-1199	D77/78	130	17 February 1987	V/Line Passenger	Southern Shorthaul Railroad	1,600 mm (5 ft 3 in) broad gauge	Purple/Yellow 'PTV'	
N471	City of Benalla	87–1200	D77/78	130	28 February 1987	V/Line Passenger	Southern Shorthaul Railroad	1,600 mm (5 ft 3 in) broad gauge	Purple/Yellow 'PTV'	Operated the final Locomotive-hauled service on the Gippsland Line on September 14, 2024
N472	City of Sale	87-1201	D77/78	130	27 March 1987	V/Line Passenger	Southern Shorthaul Railroad	1,600 mm (5 ft 3 in) broad gauge	Purple/Yellow 'PTV' with SSR logos	
N473	City of Warragul	87-1202	D77/78	130	28 April 1987	V/Line Passenger	Southern Shorthaul Railroad	1,600 mm (5 ft 3 in) broad gauge	Purple/Yellow 'PTV'	Operated the final Locomotive-hauled service on the Warrnambool Line on March 30, 2025
N474	City of Traralgon	87-1203	D77/78	130	28 May 1987	V/Line Passenger	Southern Shorthaul Railroad	1,600 mm (5 ft 3 in) broad gauge	Purple/Yellow 'PTV'	
N475	City of Moe	87-1204	D77/78	130	6 July 1987	V/Line Passenger	Southern Shorthaul Railroad	1,600 mm (5 ft 3 in) broad gauge	Purple/Yellow 'PTV'	

== Gallery ==
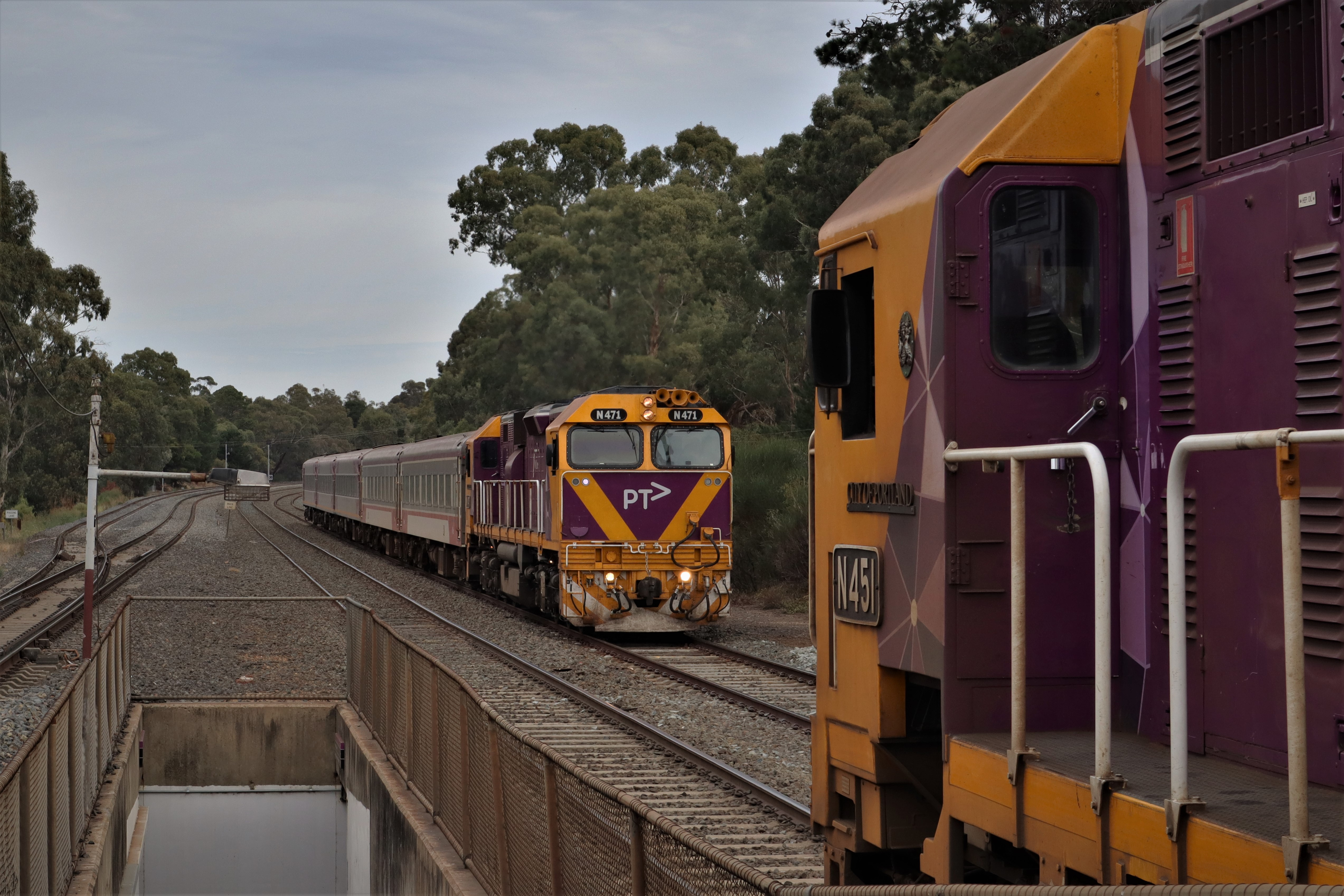
N451 "City of Portland" crossing N471 "City of Benalla" at Tallarook

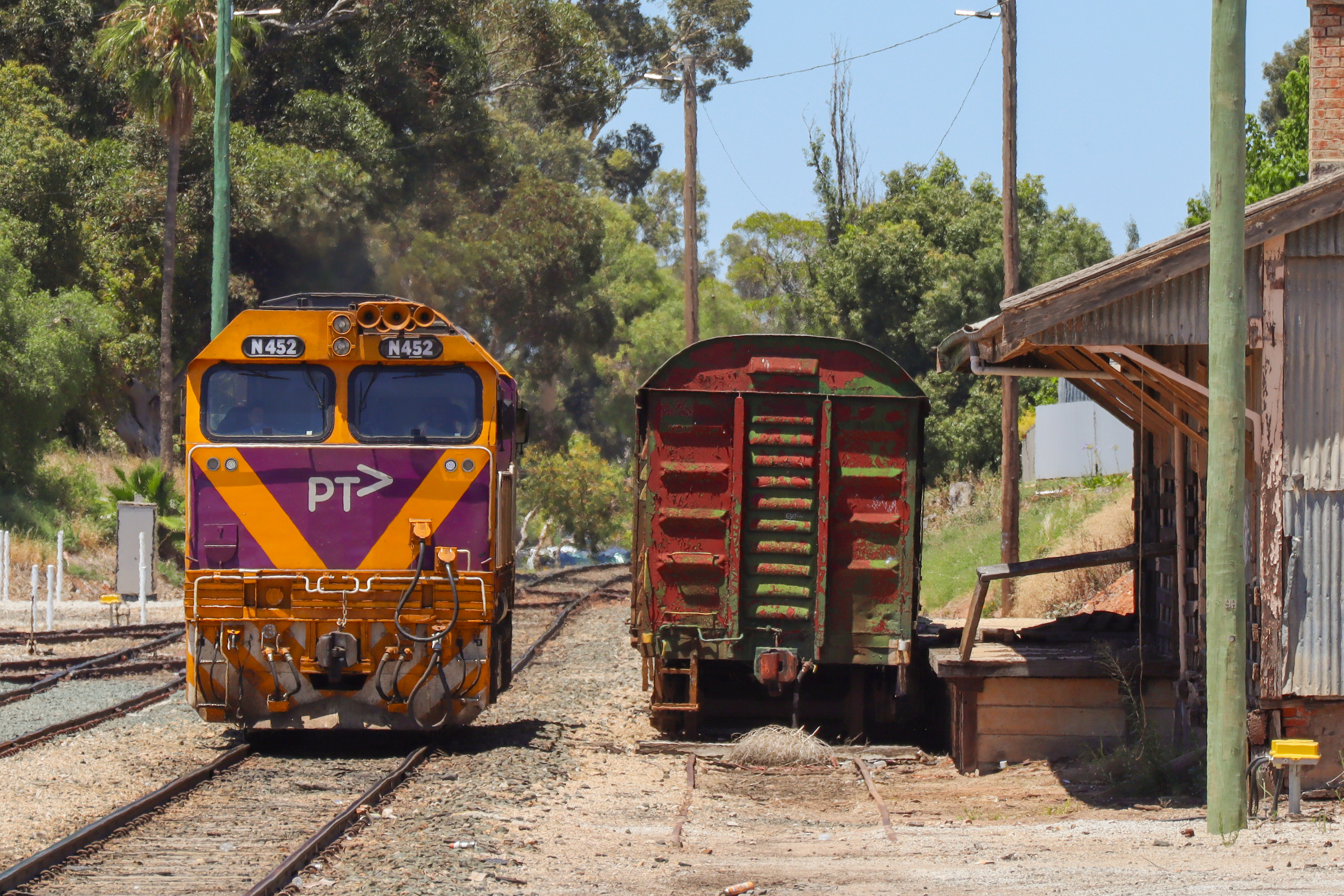
N452 "Rural City of Wodonga" runs around at Swan Hill

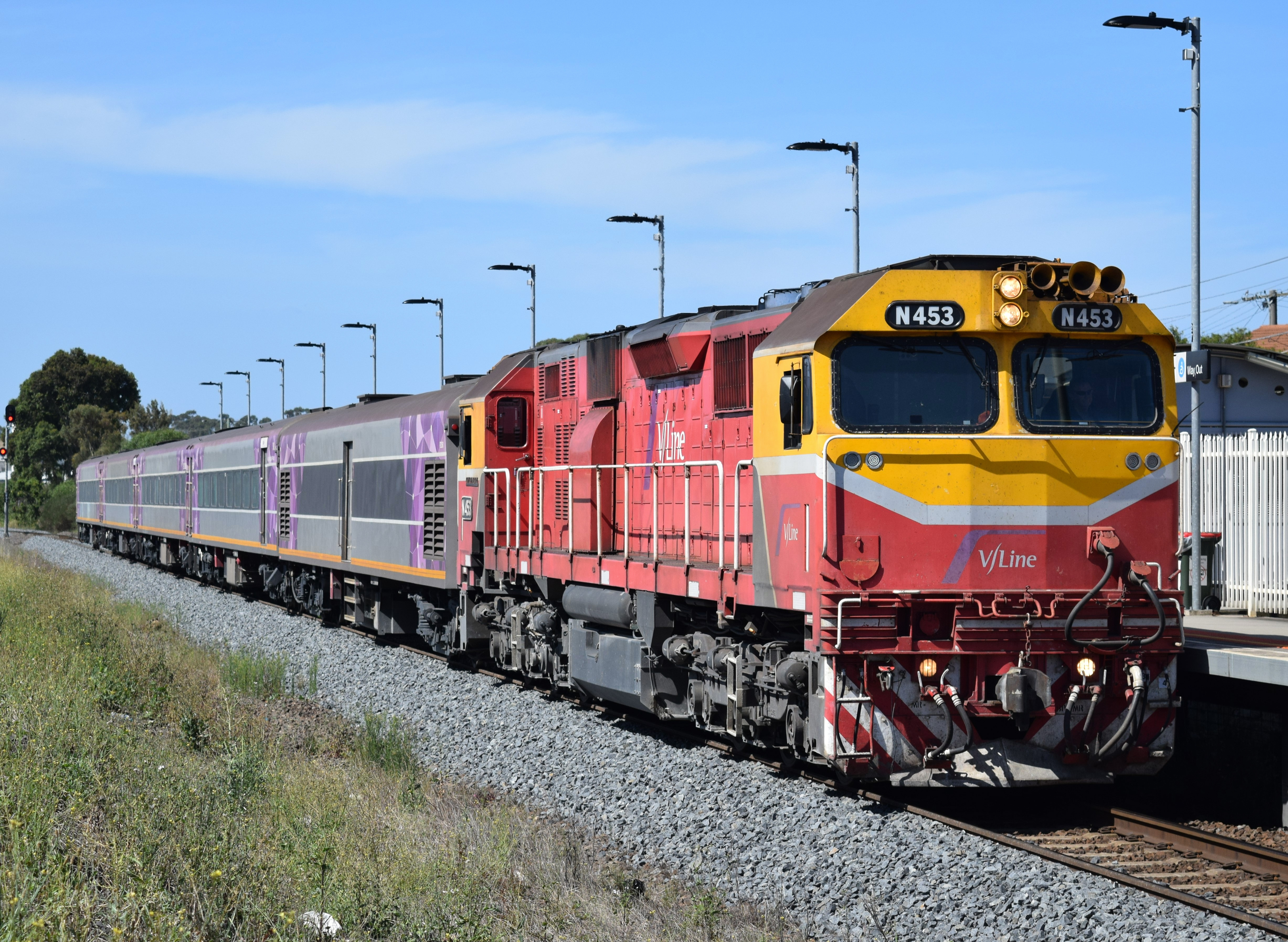
N453 "City of Albury" arrives into Broadmeadows on a service from Albury. 17 January 2021.

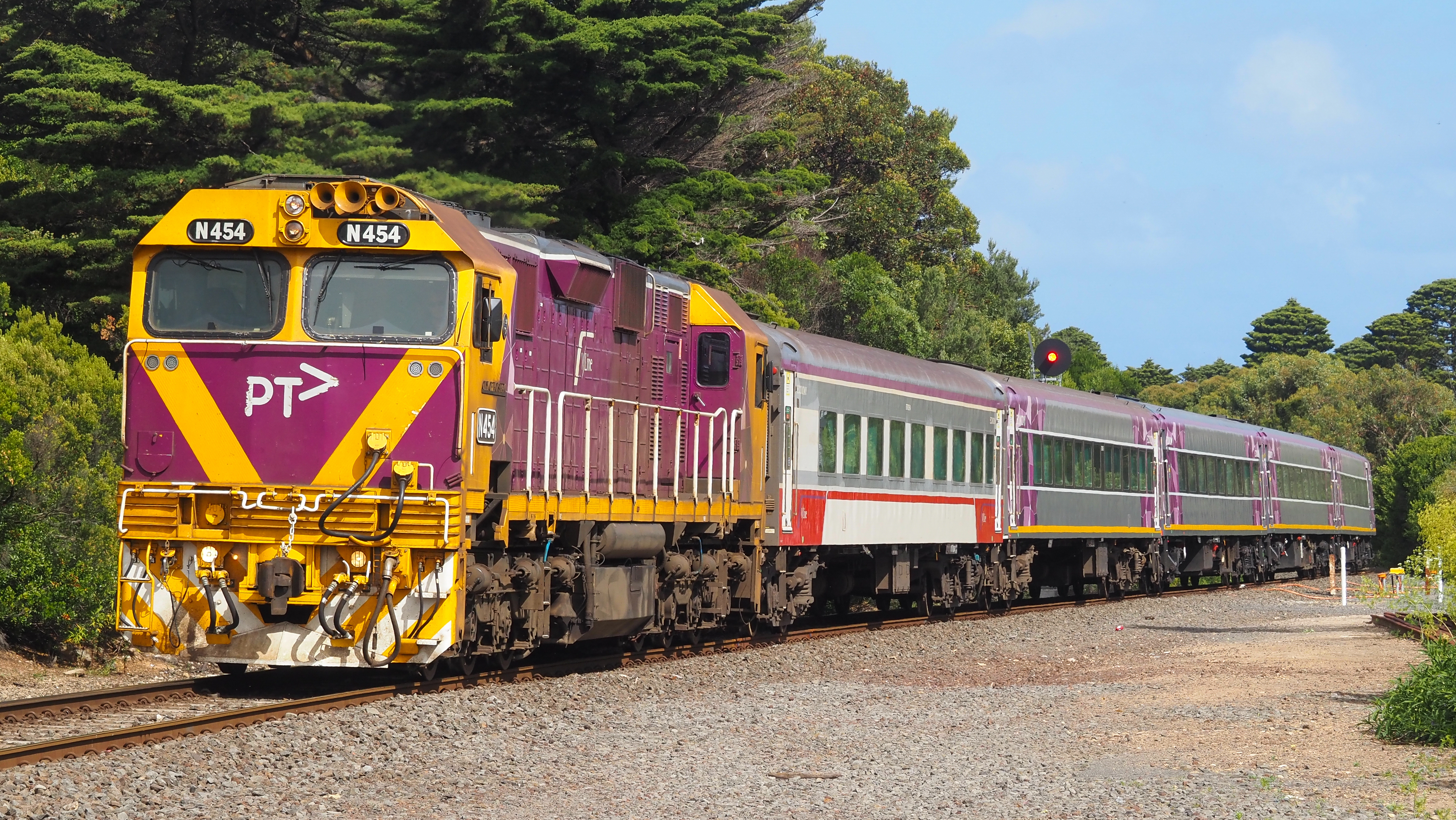
N454 "City of Horsham" arrives into Warrnambool

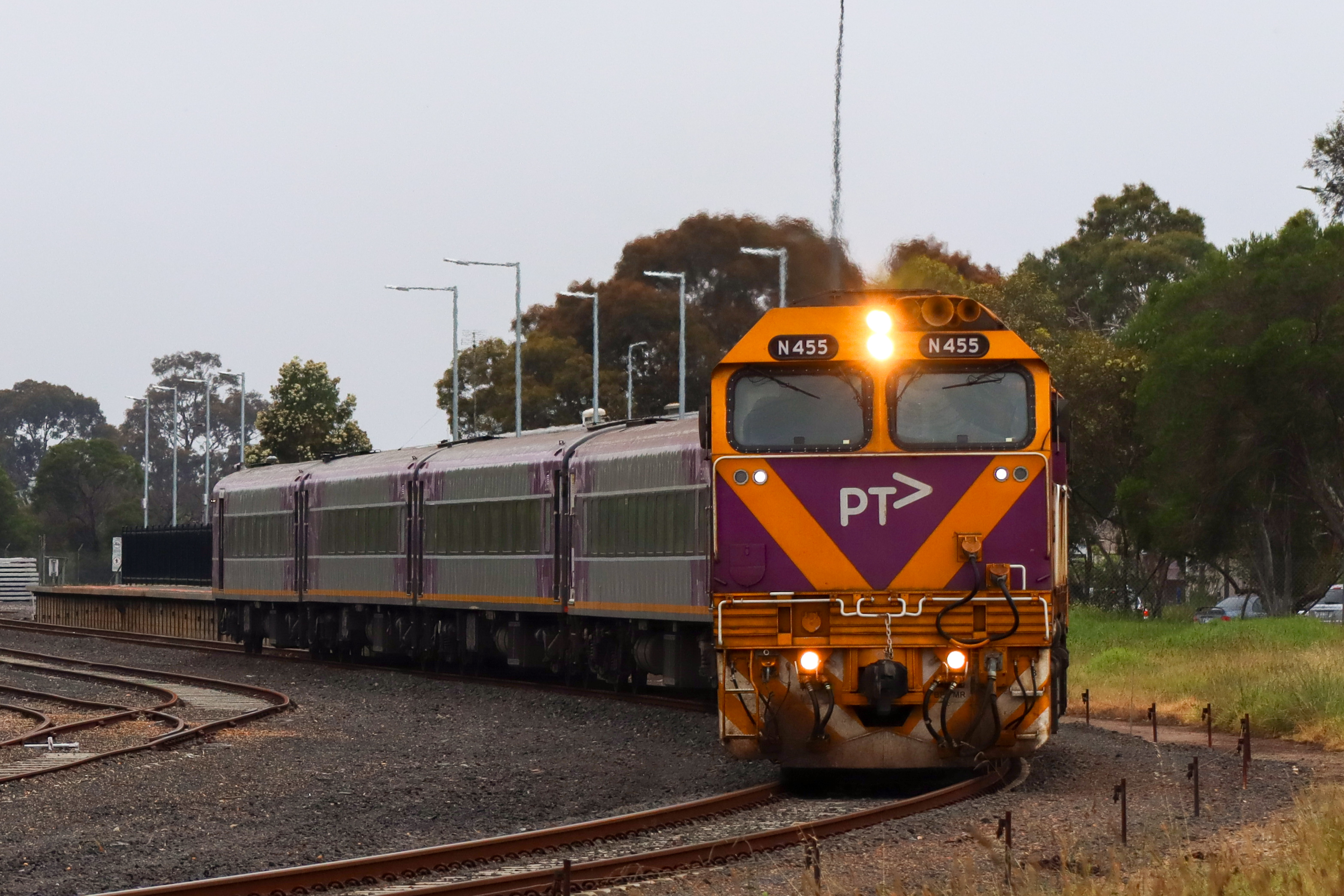
N455 “City of Swan hill” departs Sale

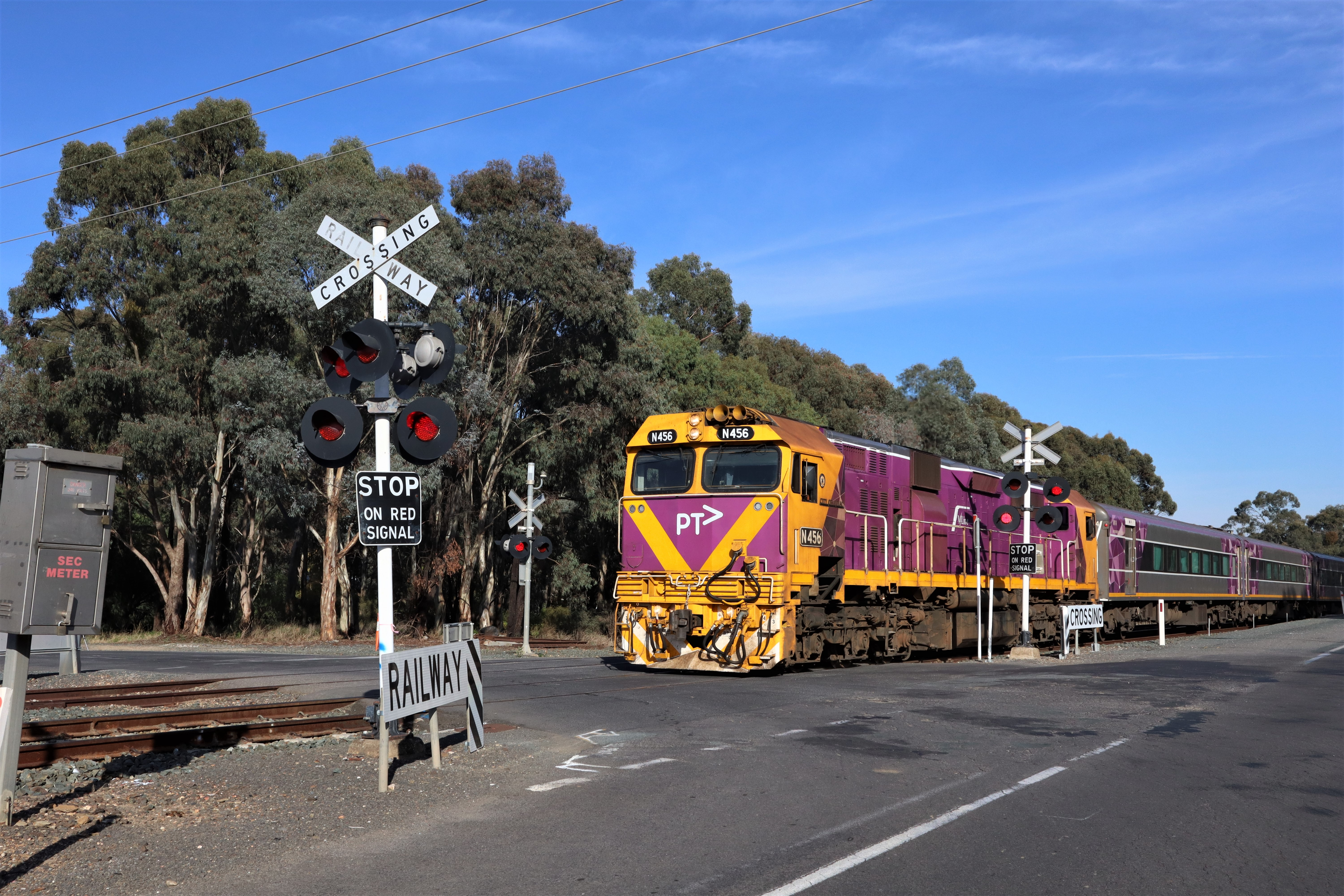
N456 "City of Colac" at Eaglehawke

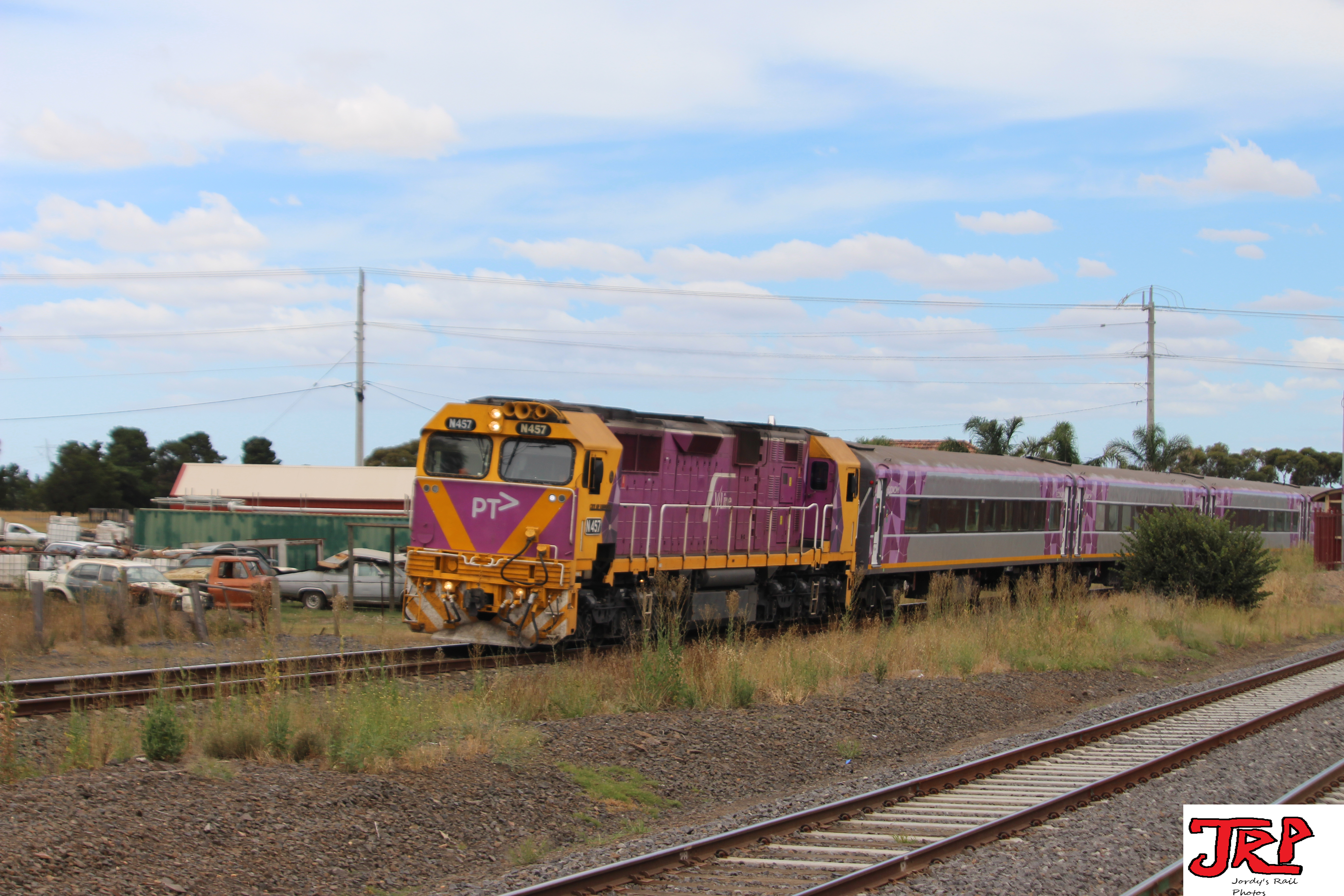
N457 "City of Mildura" at Donnybrook

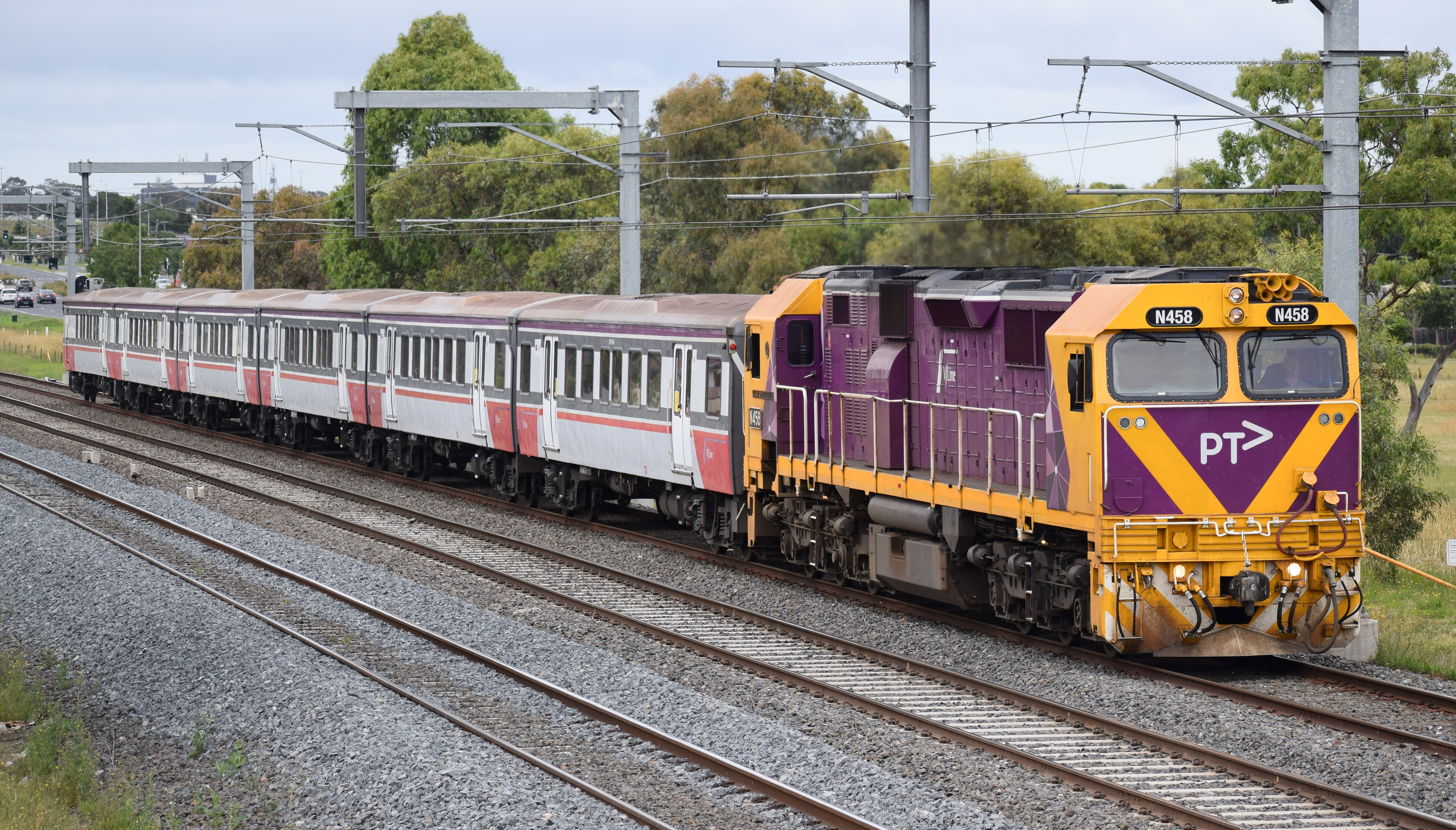
N458 on a Shepparton service passes Coolaroo. 18–1–21

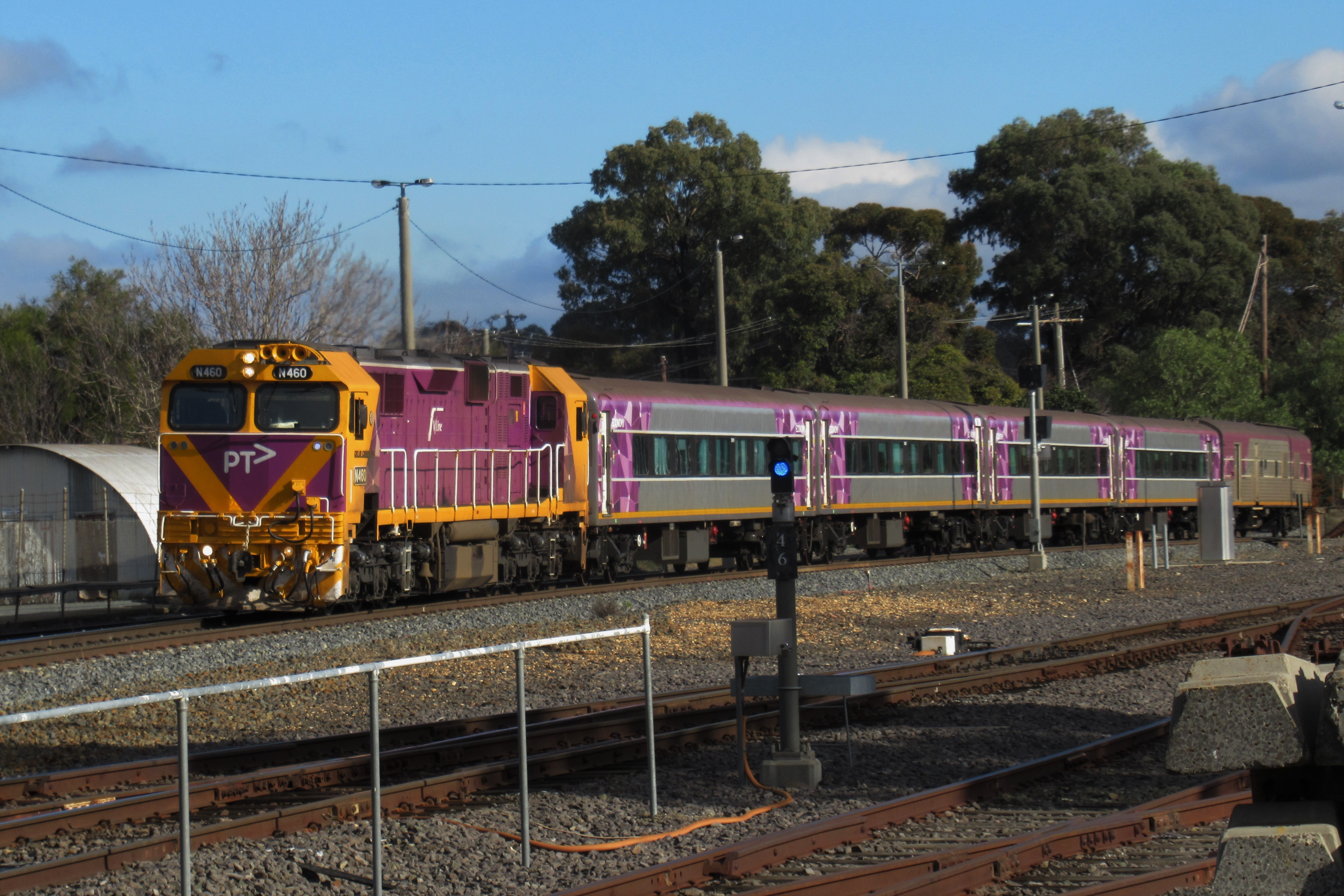
N460 "City of Castlemaine" at Seymour

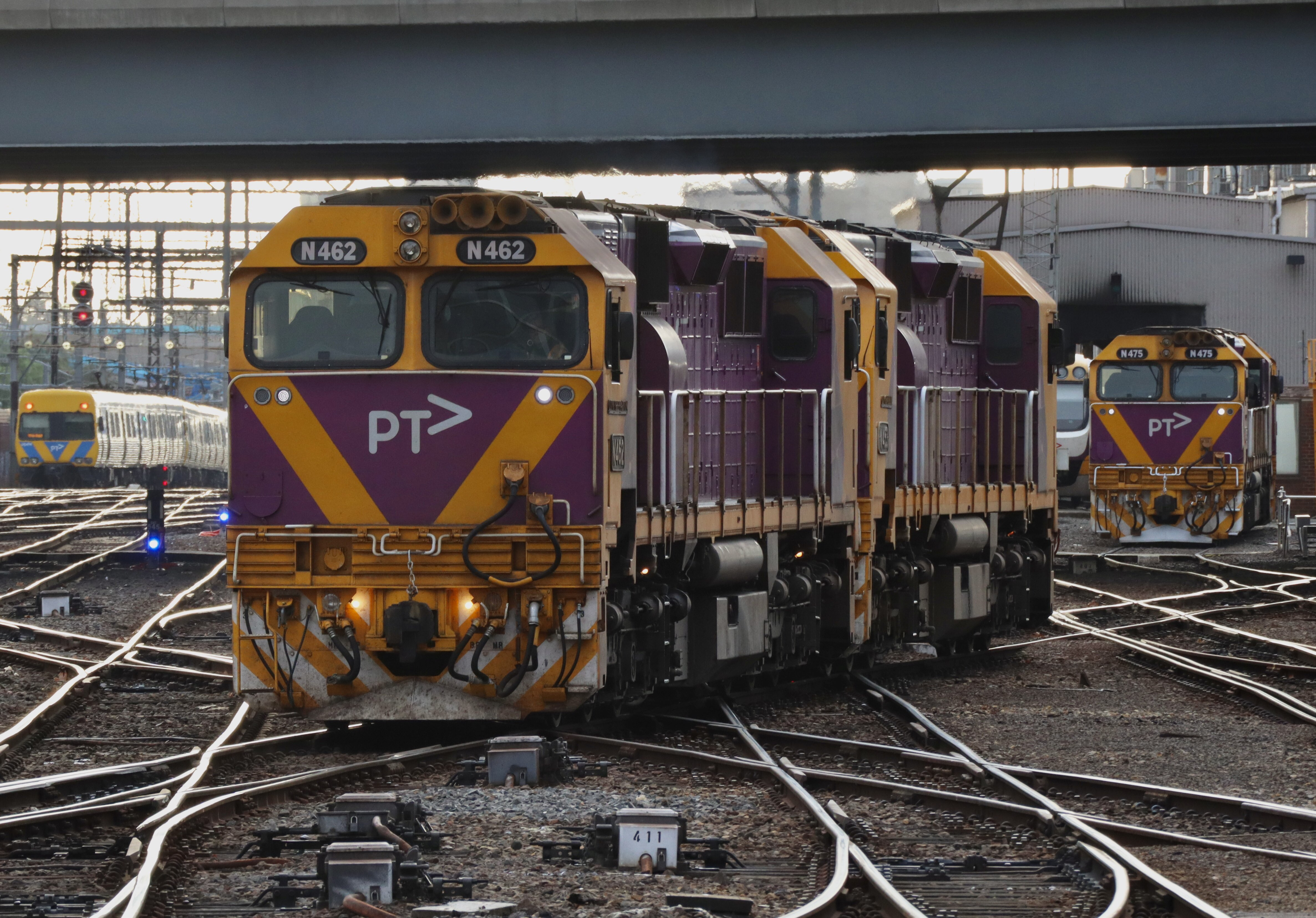
N462 "City of Shepparton" leads N453 "City of Albury" at Southern Cross, while 475 "City of Moe" looks on

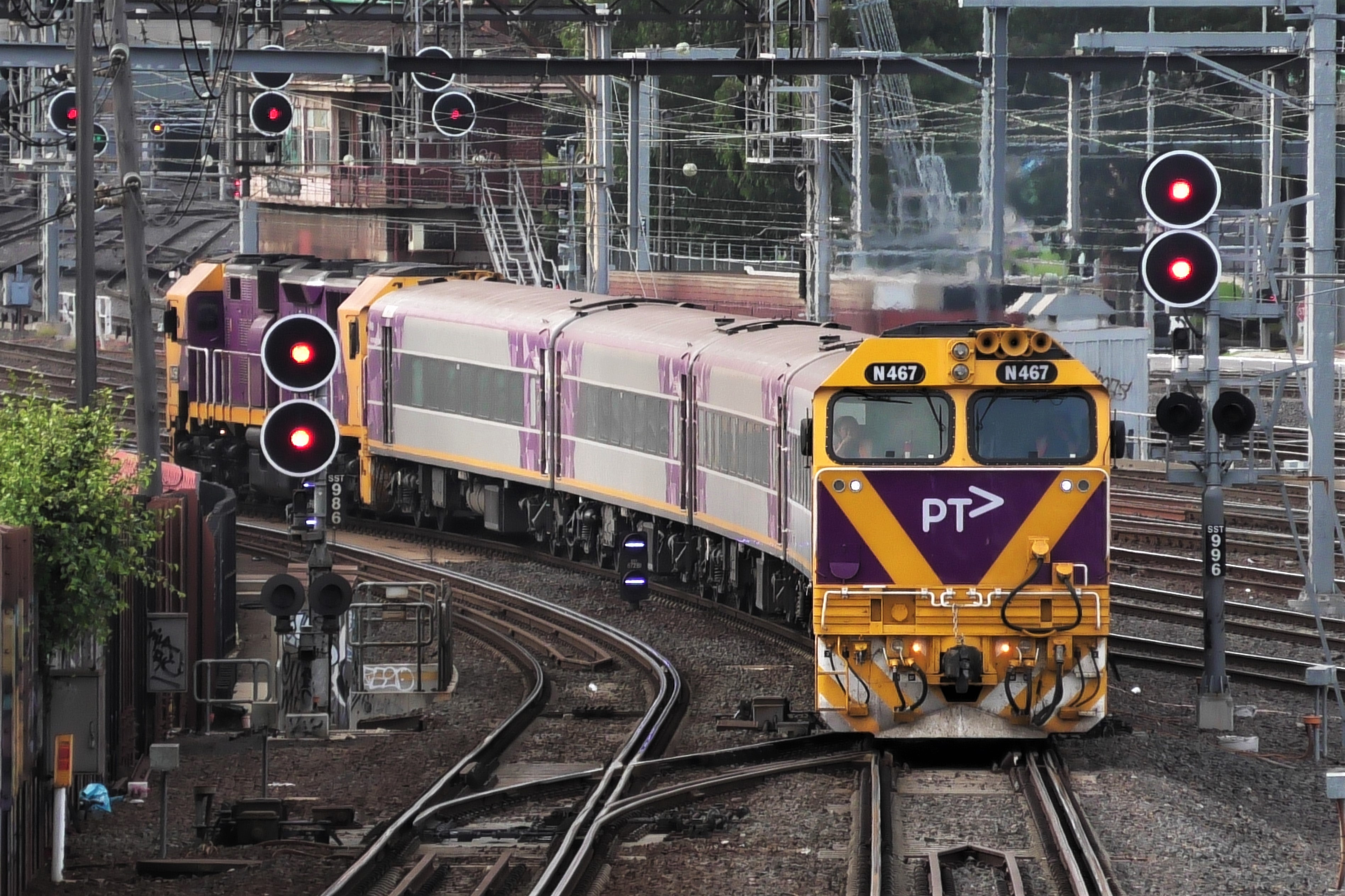
N467 "City of Stawell" & N458 "City of Bairnsdale" in push-pull formation at North Melbourne

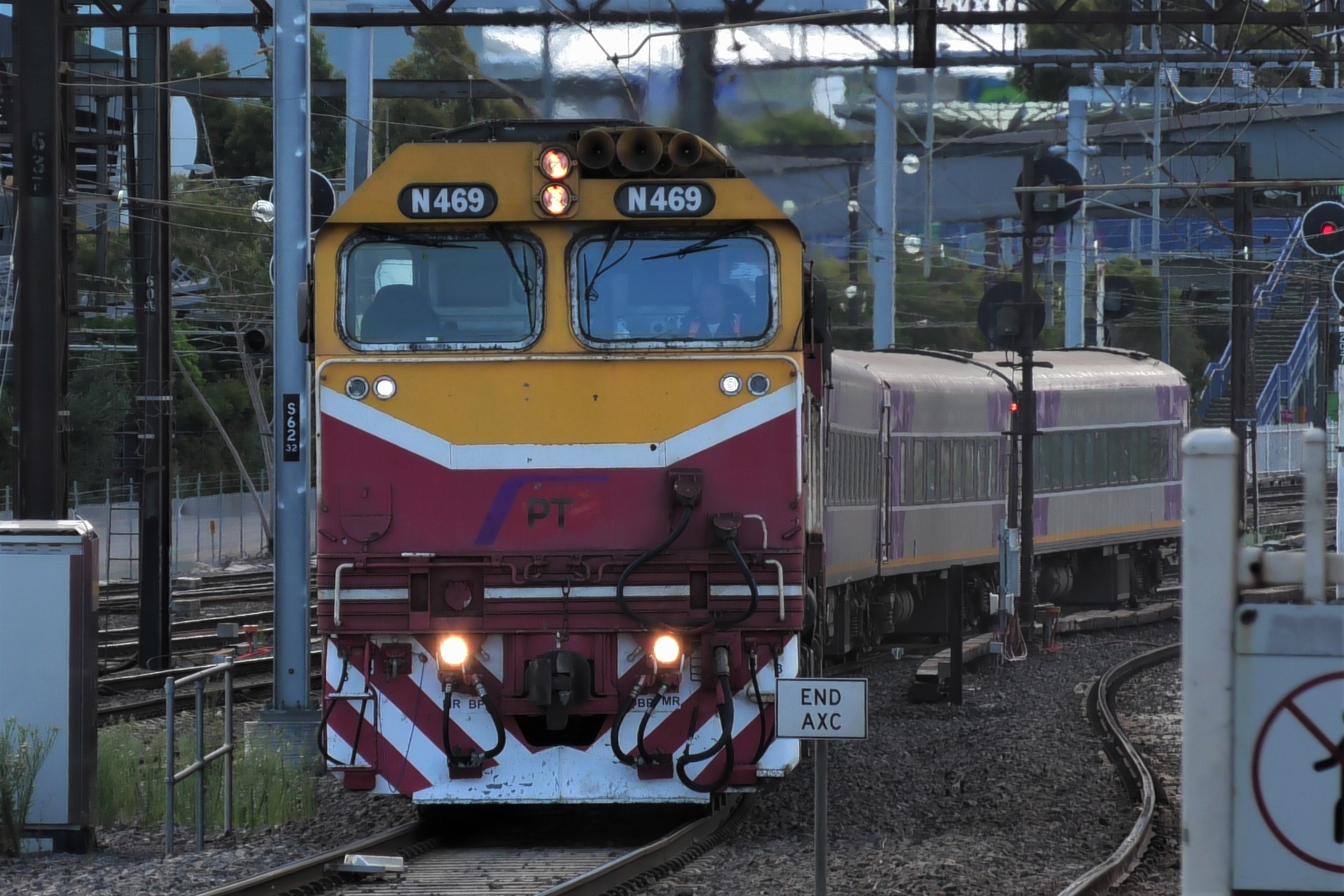
N469 "City of Morwell" at Richmond

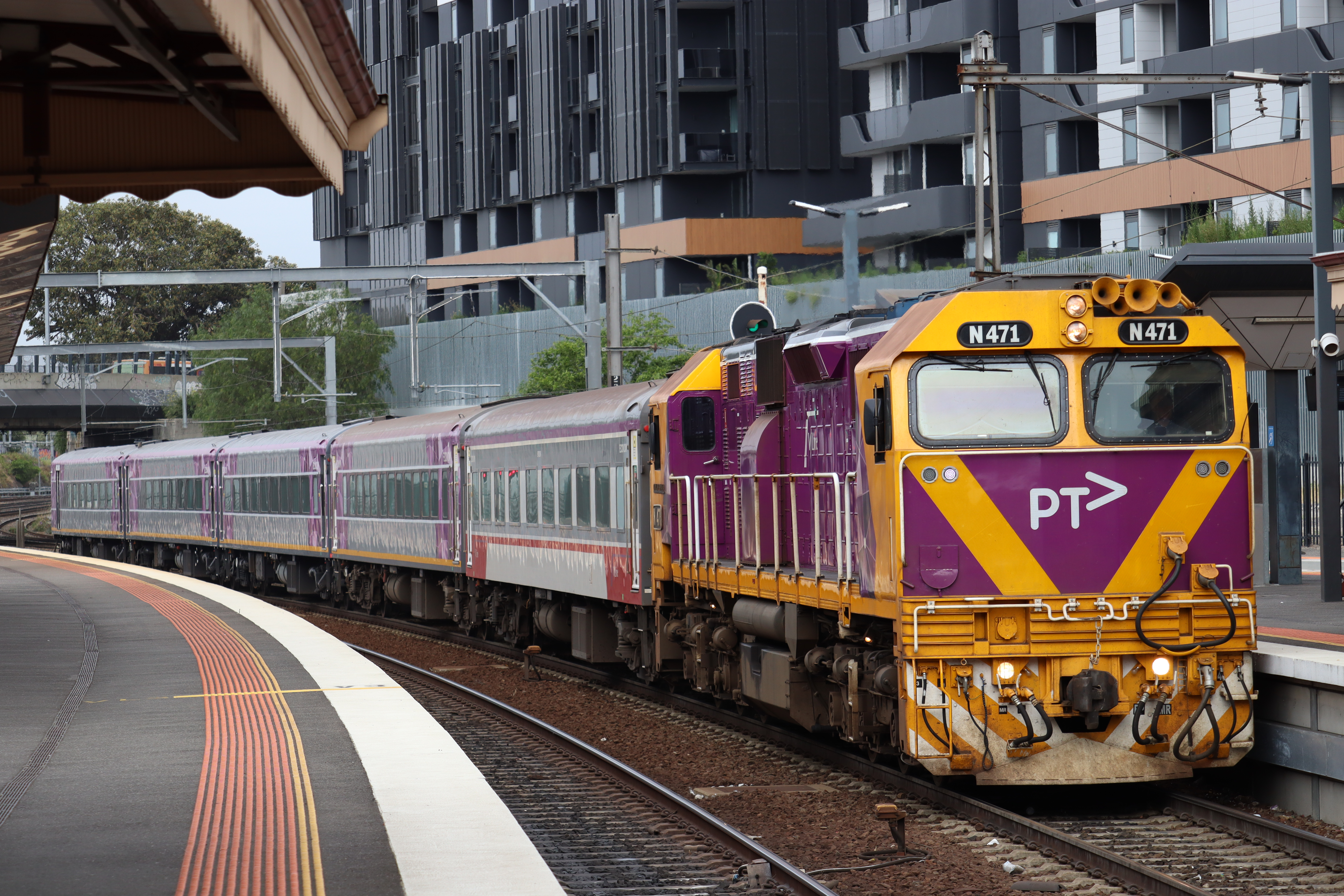
N471 "City of Benalla" at Footscray

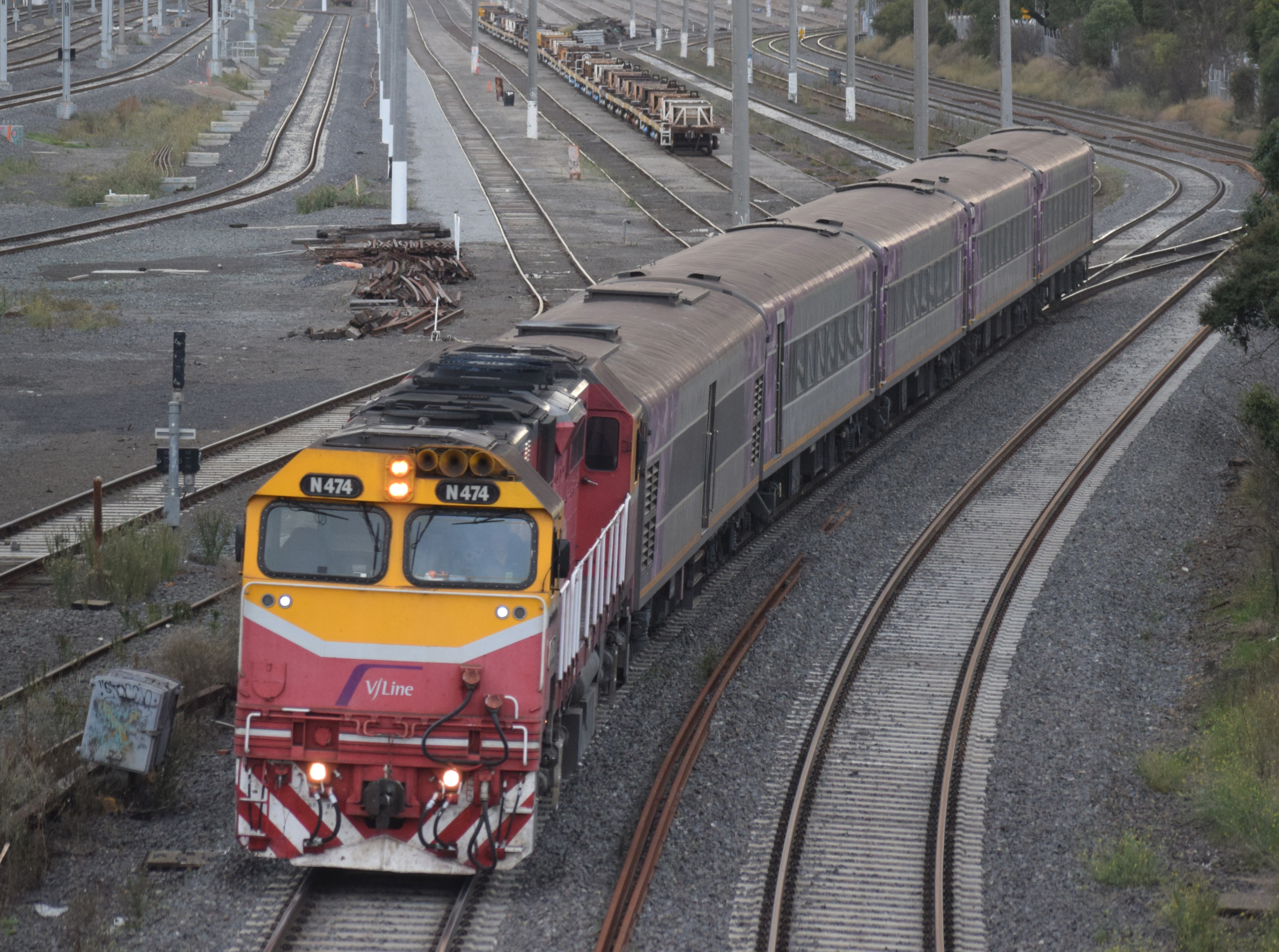
N474 on a service from Albury passes West Footscray. 9–4–21.

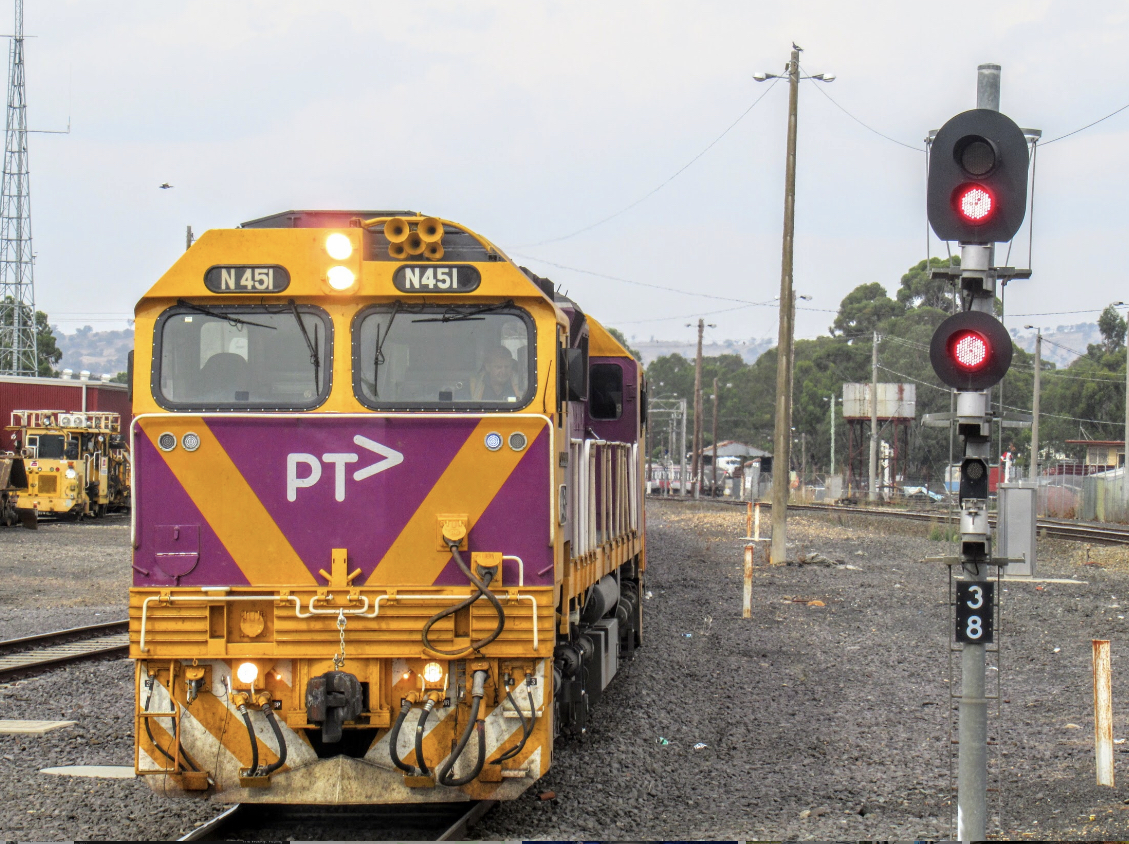
N451 "City of Portland" at Seymour

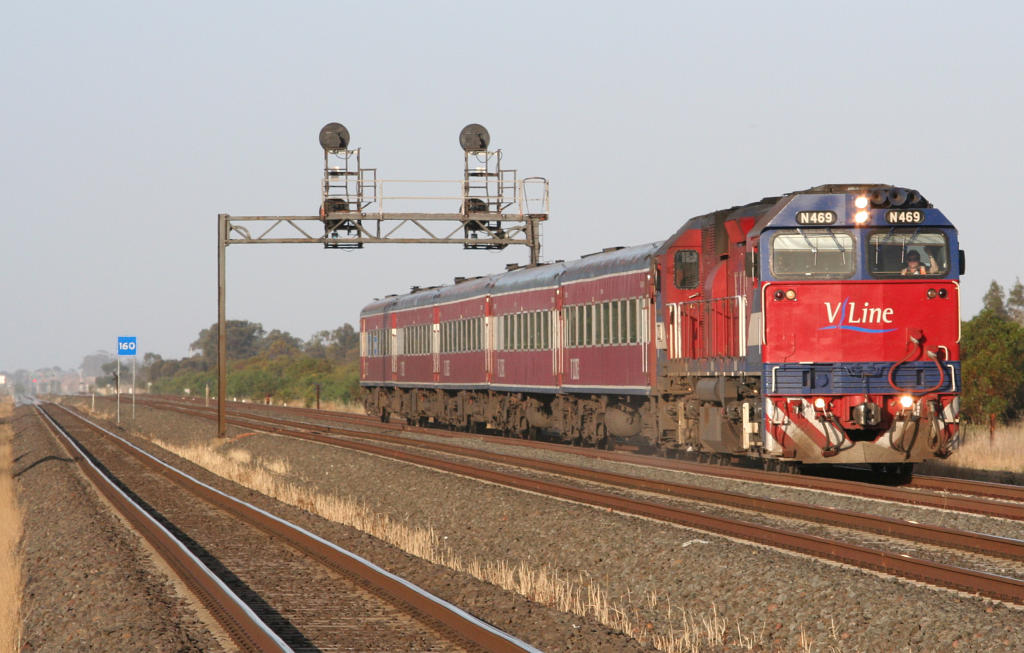
N469 "City of Morwell" at Lara

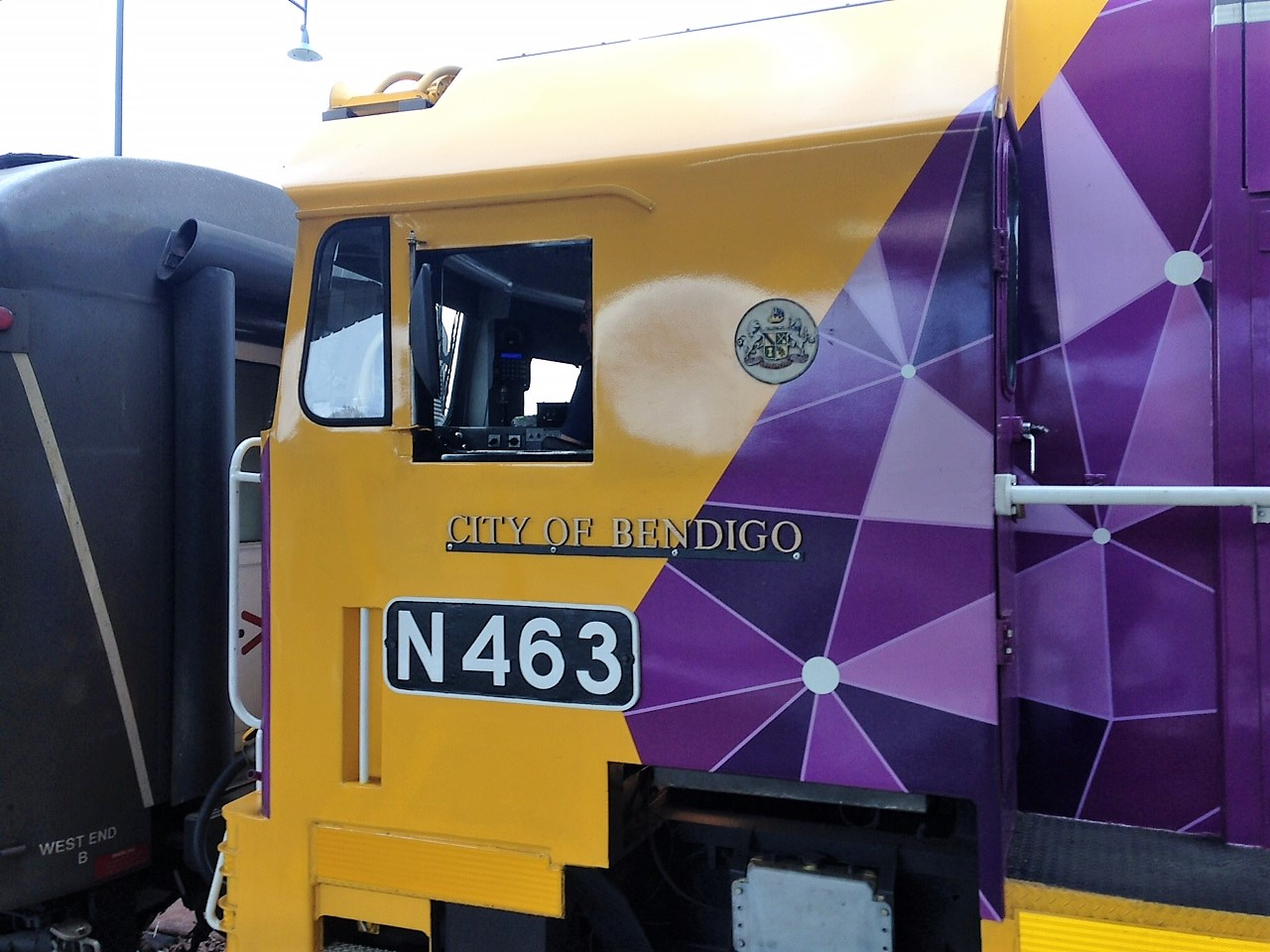
N463 "City of Bendigo" at Albury

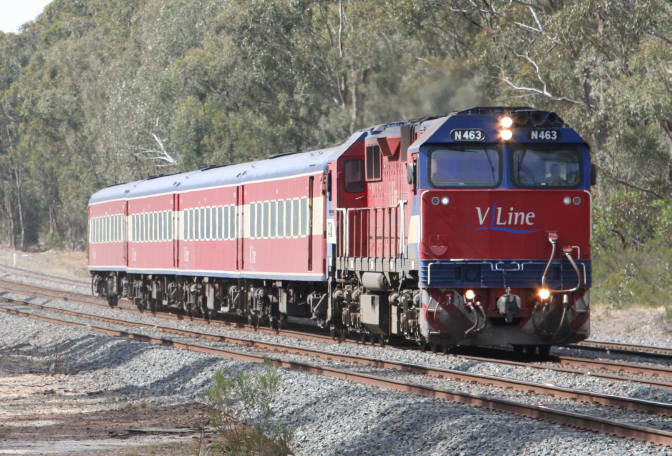
N463 "City of Bendigo" between Mangalore and Seymour
