= Avenel railway station =

Railway station in Victoria, Australia

Avenel
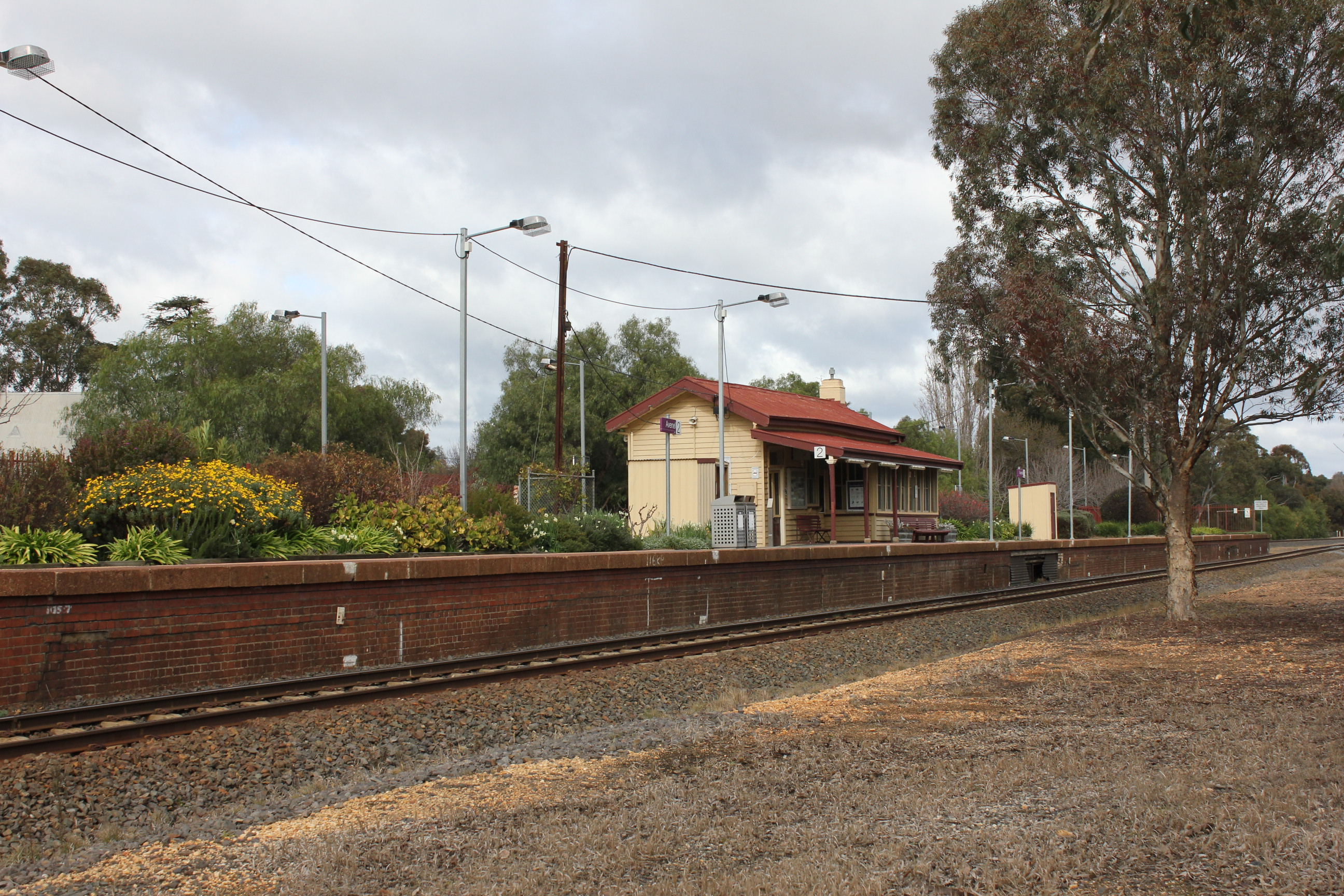
- Southbound view of the station platform and building, July 2018

General information
- Location: Queen Street, Avenel, Victoria 3664; Shire of Strathbogie; Australia
- Coordinates: 36°53′37″S 145°13′46″E
- System: PTV regional rail station
- Owner: VicTrack
- Operator: V/Line
- Line: Albury (North East)
- Distance: 115.96 kilometres from Southern Cross
- Platforms: 2 (1 island)
- Tracks: 2

Construction
- Structure type: Ground
- Parking: Yes
- Cycle facilities: Yes
- Accessible: Yes

Other information
- Status: Operational, unstaffed
- Station code: AVL
- Fare zone: Myki zone 7/8
- Website: Public Transport Victoria

History
- Opened: 20 November 1872; 153 years ago
- Rebuilt: August 2010; 16 years ago

Services
Preceding station	V/Line	Following station
Seymour towards Southern Cross	Albury line	Euroa towards Albury
Location
- Location within Victoria

Avenel railway station is a regional railway station on the North East line. It serves the town of Avenel, in Victoria, Australia. Avenel is a ground level unstaffed station, featuring two side platforms. It opened on 20 November 1872, with the current station provided in August 2010.

== History ==
Avenel station opened with the line, and had a 200-foot (61 m)-long platform, temporary station buildings and a large goods shed. In 1875, the goods shed was destroyed by fire, and was replaced in the following year. A permanent station building was provided in 1881, which had been replaced by the 1970s.

Platform 1, which faced the former broad gauge track on the eastern side, was originally on a loop siding off the main line, with the main line slewed to its present location during rationalisation of the yard.

In 1972, No. 4 road was abolished, with No. 5 road renumbered to No. 4. By December 1991, No. 4 road and siding "B" were abolished. Further sidings and roads were abolished in July 1997, as well as all signals, effectively leaving Avenel as a wayside station.

As part of the North East Rail Revitalisation Project, a second platform was constructed on the standard gauge line, in conjunction with the conversion of the broad gauge track to standard gauge. The work was completed in August 2010.

The station is now under the care of a group of local volunteers, the Stationeers, who meet every Friday morning to maintain the station and surrounding gardens. They have also restored the building, including the disused McKenzie & Holland lever frame.

Former station Mangalore was located between Avenel and Seymour, while Monea, Locksley, Longwood and Creighton stations were located between Avenel and Euroa.

== Platforms and services ==
Avenel has one island platform with two faces. It is served by V/Line Albury line trains.

Avenel platform arrangement
Platform	Line	Destination
1	Albury line	Southern Cross
2	Albury line	Albury

== Gallery ==
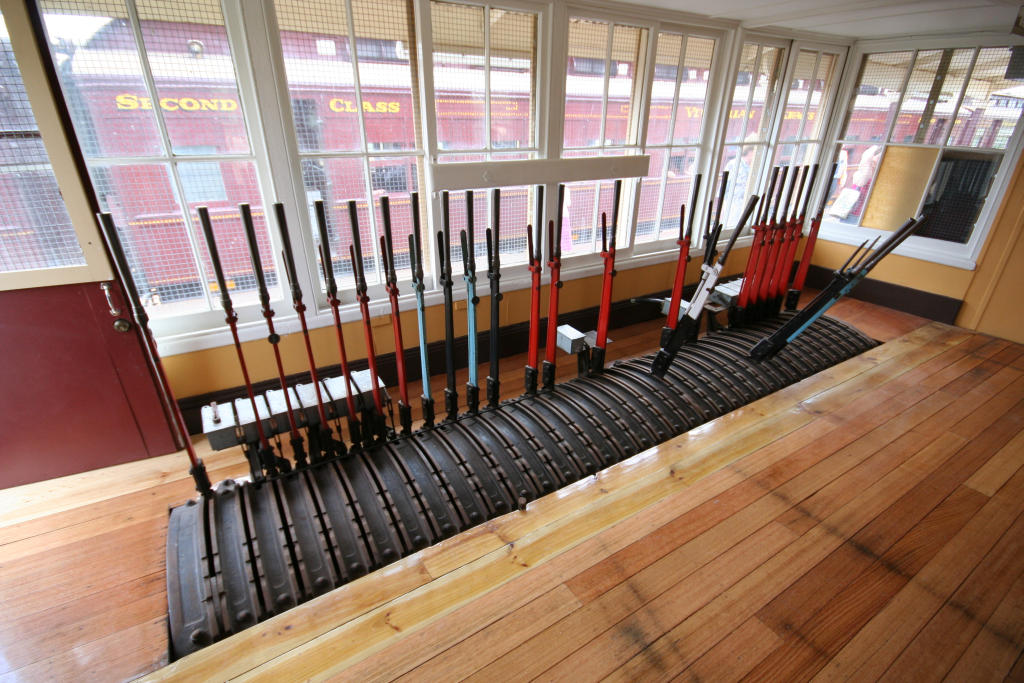
The disused McKenzie & Holland lever frame, October 2007

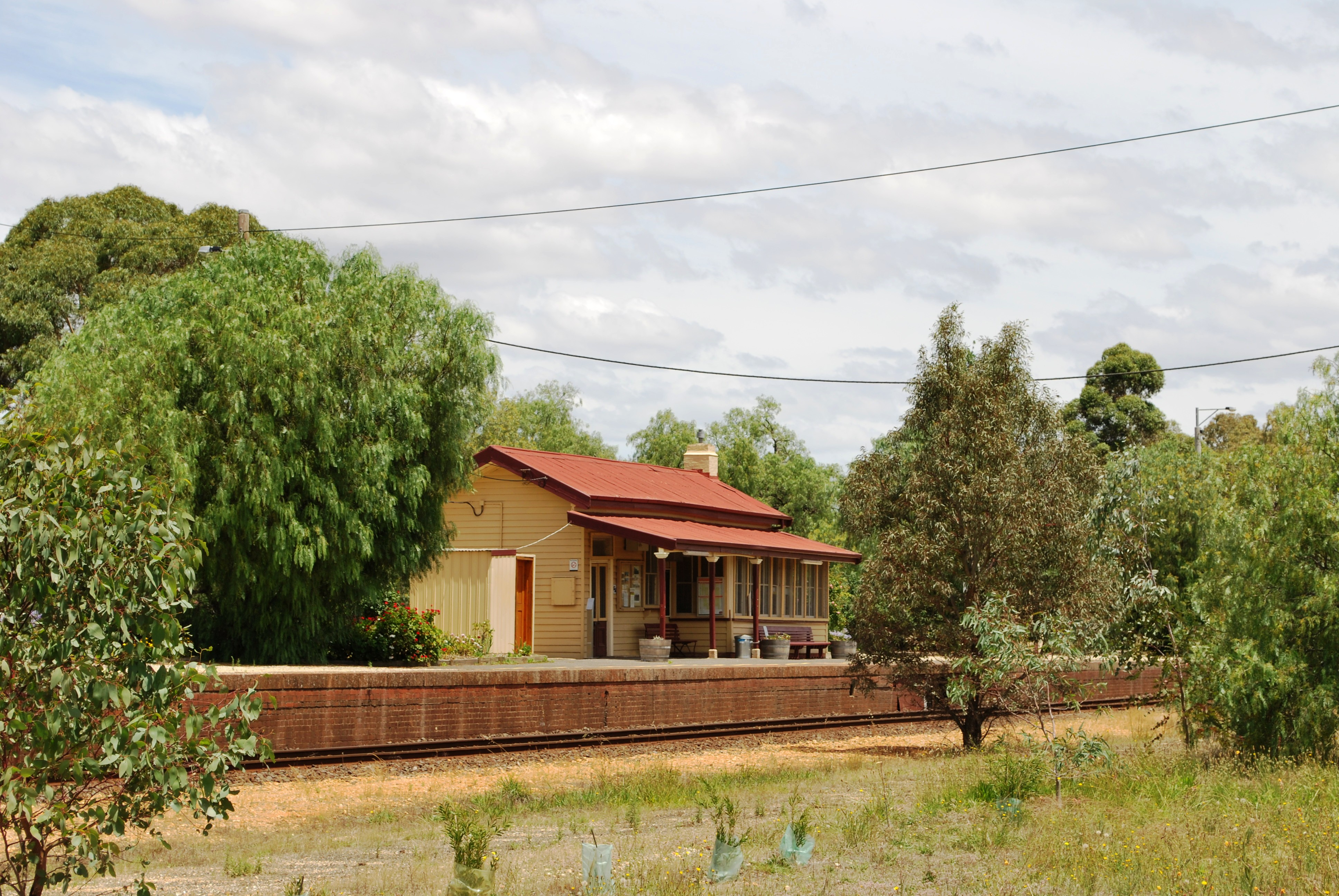
Southbound view of Platform 2, December 2008

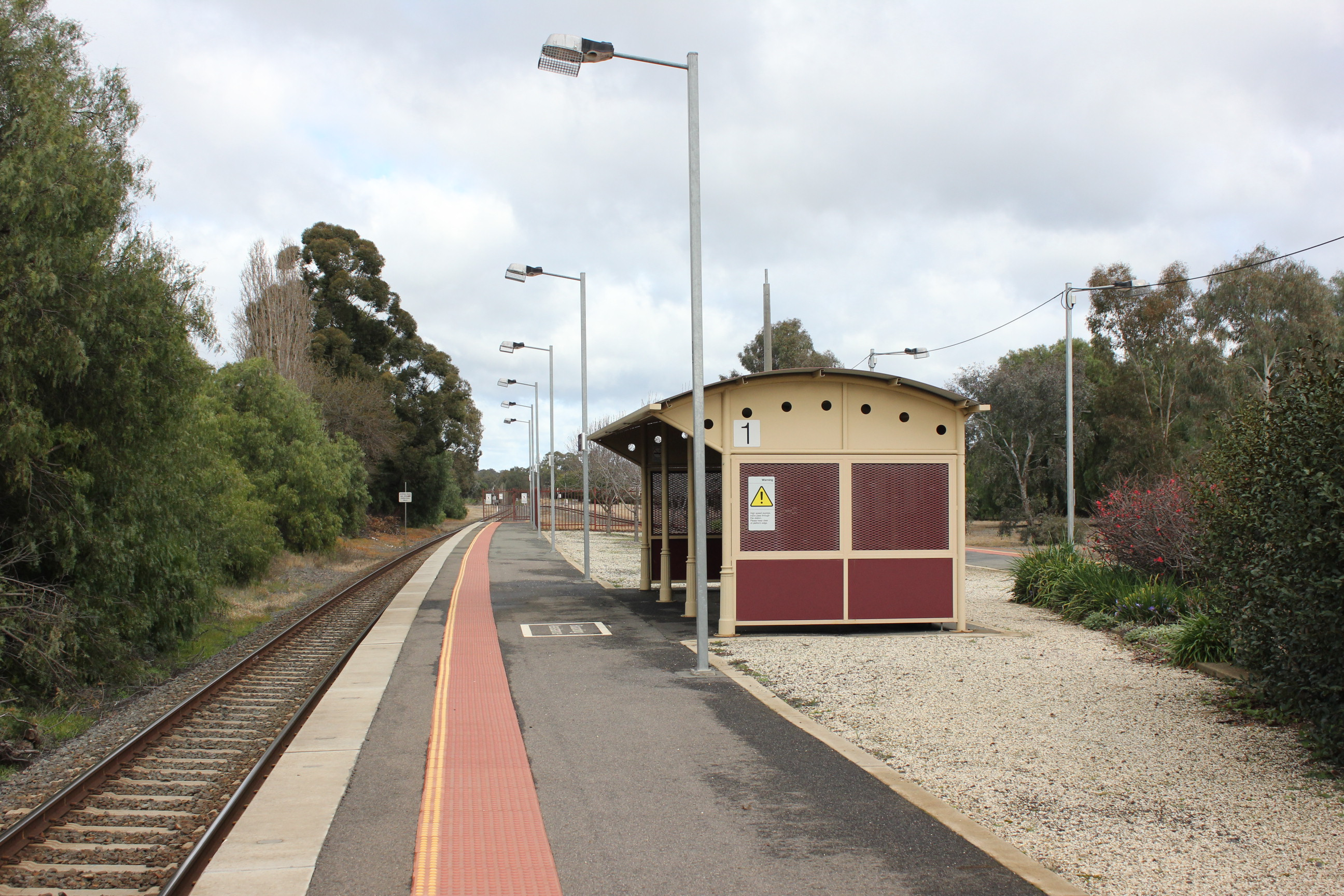
Southbound view from Platform 1, including waiting shelter, July 2018
