= Monea railway station =

Former railway station in Victoria, Australia

Coordinates: 36°51′36″S 145°16′58″E

Monea

General information
- Line: North East

Other information
- Status: Closed

History
- Opened: 27 February 1882
- Closed: 13 June 1960

Services
Preceding station	V/Line	Following station
Avenel towards Southern Cross	North East line	Locksley towards Albury
List of closed railway stations in Victoria
Location

Monea is a closed railway station located in the township of Monea, on the Albury-Wodonga railway line in Victoria, Australia.

The station was opened in February 1882 to serve firewood traffic from the surrounding area, and had only a loop siding and single platform. By 1887 there were three sawmills located on the siding, as well as two more nearby. The platform was initially 100 feet (30 m) long but was doubled in length by 1907. The station closed to all traffic in June 1960 and by the 1970s little trace remained.
