= Manby =

Village and civil parish in Lincolnshire, England

Coordinates: 53.3583°N 0.1002°E

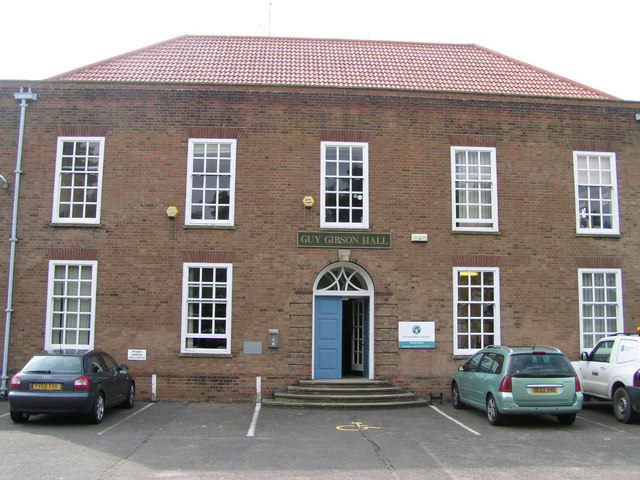
- Guy Gibson Hall, formerly the Station Headquarters, RAF Manby

- Location within Lincolnshire
- Population: 1,655 (2021)
- OS grid reference: TF398866
  - London: 125 mi (201 km) S
- District: East Lindsey
- Shire county: Lincolnshire
- Region: East Midlands
- Country: England
- Sovereign state: United Kingdom
- Post town: LOUTH
- Postcode district: LN11
- Dialling code: 01507
- Police: Lincolnshire
- Fire: Lincolnshire
- Ambulance: East Midlands
- UK Parliament: Louth and Horncastle

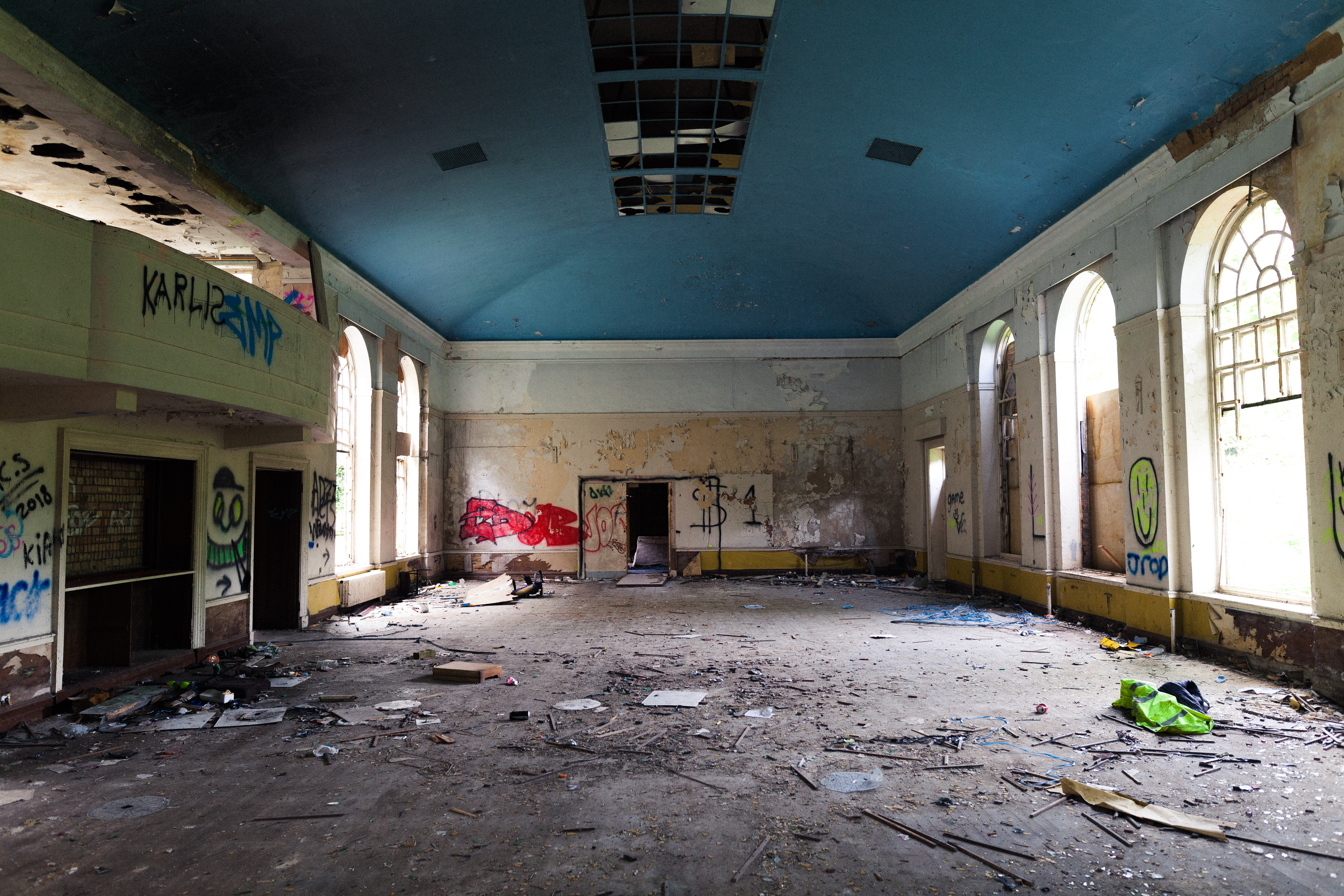
Inside the abandoned RAF Manby Officers' Mess building in 2016

Manby is a village and civil parish in the East Lindsey district of Lincolnshire, England, and lies approximately 5 miles (8 km) east from Louth. Manby contains a village post office. Other amenities, including a primary school, The Manby Arms public house, two village shops, and an Italian restaurant, are in the conjoined village of Grimoldby, separated from Manby by the B1200 road. The population was 1,655 at the 2021 census.

Manby scout group, the 1st Manby, has existed for 60 years. It is one of only two scout groups in the area to include all scouting sections: Beavers, aged 6–8; Cubs, aged 8–10; Scouts, aged 11½–14; and Explorers, aged 14–18. The other is the 6th Skegness.

== RAF Manby ==
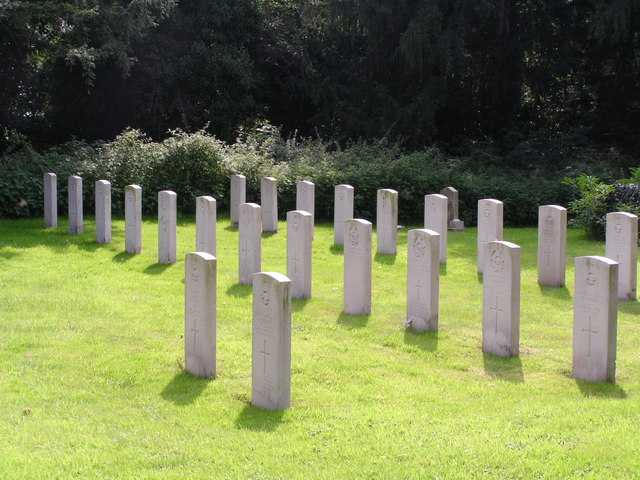
Forces Graveyard, St Mary's churchyard

RAF Manby was situated near the village between 1938 and 1974. Houses in Manby were built for RAF personnel, with village streets named after aeroplanes. In 1977 East Lindsey District Council bought the former RAF College of Air Warfare building, known as Tedder Hall, and converted it to become the council's headquarters. The council remained based at Manby until 2023 when it moved to Horncastle.

In the late 1980s the entire pre war Married Quarter estate Carlton Park was sold to a Roger Byron-Collins company. The airfield was sold for commercial use. It is now a business park, and the former airfield has been returned to agriculture with an intensive cattle fattening plant. Regents Academy was also based at the park until 2017.

In 2008 East Lindsey District Council proposed that the site be a possible location for an eco-town of 5,000 homes; it appeared on a government shortlist of ten such sites. After protests from residents the council voted to withdraw the plan.

The remaining Officers' Mess building has been the subject of many arson attacks over the years as it sits in a derelict state.

== Climate ==
Climate data for Manby 13m asl, 1991–2020
Month	Jan	Feb	Mar	Apr	May	Jun	Jul	Aug	Sep	Oct	Nov	Dec	Year
Mean daily maximum °C (°F)	7.1 (44.8)	8.1 (46.6)	10.5 (50.9)	13.1 (55.6)	15.9 (60.6)	18.8 (65.8)	21.6 (70.9)	21.0 (69.8)	18.5 (65.3)	14.5 (58.1)	10.4 (50.7)	7.5 (45.5)	13.9 (57.0)
Daily mean °C (°F)	4.3 (39.7)	4.9 (40.8)	6.7 (44.1)	8.8 (47.8)	11.4 (52.5)	14.4 (57.9)	16.8 (62.2)	16.6 (61.9)	14.4 (57.9)	11.0 (51.8)	7.3 (45.1)	4.6 (40.3)	10.1 (50.2)
Mean daily minimum °C (°F)	1.5 (34.7)	1.6 (34.9)	3.0 (37.4)	4.5 (40.1)	7.1 (44.8)	9.9 (49.8)	12.0 (53.6)	12.2 (54.0)	10.2 (50.4)	7.5 (45.5)	4.2 (39.6)	1.8 (35.2)	6.3 (43.3)
Average precipitation mm (inches)	54.3 (2.14)	43.3 (1.70)	36.4 (1.43)	40.3 (1.59)	45.9 (1.81)	62.2 (2.45)	55.0 (2.17)	59.1 (2.33)	53.6 (2.11)	62.9 (2.48)	63.8 (2.51)	57.9 (2.28)	634.5 (24.98)
Average precipitation days (≥ 1.0 mm)	11.2	9.9	8.6	8.6	8.3	9.8	9.5	9.2	8.8	11.1	12.7	11.6	119.3
Mean monthly sunshine hours	64.3	85.3	127.9	163.8	215.5	200.5	209.7	198.5	154.6	115.8	73.4	59.5	1,668.9
Source: Met Office
