= Loxley =

Loxley may refer to:

== Places ==
- Loxley, Alabama, a town in the United States
- Loxley, Michigan, an unincorporated community
- Loxley, South Yorkshire, a village and a suburb of the city of Sheffield, England, traditionally the birthplace of Robin Hood
  - River Loxley, a river in South Yorkshire
- Loxley, Warwickshire, a village in England

== Buildings ==
- Loxley Hall, an early-19th-century country house near Uttoxeter, Staffordshire, England
- Loxley House, a Georgian building in Sheffield, South Yorkshire, England
- Loxley House, Nottingham, the administrative home of Nottingham City Council

== Organisations ==
- Loxley PLC, a public company and one of largest trading conglomerates in Thailand

== People ==
- Alicia Loxley (born 1981), Australian journalist and news presenter
- Bert Loxley (1934–2008), English footballer and manager
- John Loxley (1942–2020), Canadian economist

== See also ==
- Lacksley Castell (1962–1984) (sometimes misspelled as Loxley Castell), Jamaican reggae singer
- Lower Loxley, a location in the fictional universe of The Archers, a long-running United Kingdom radio drama serial
- Robin of Loxley (disambiguation)
