= Locksley, Victoria =

Locksley
- Town
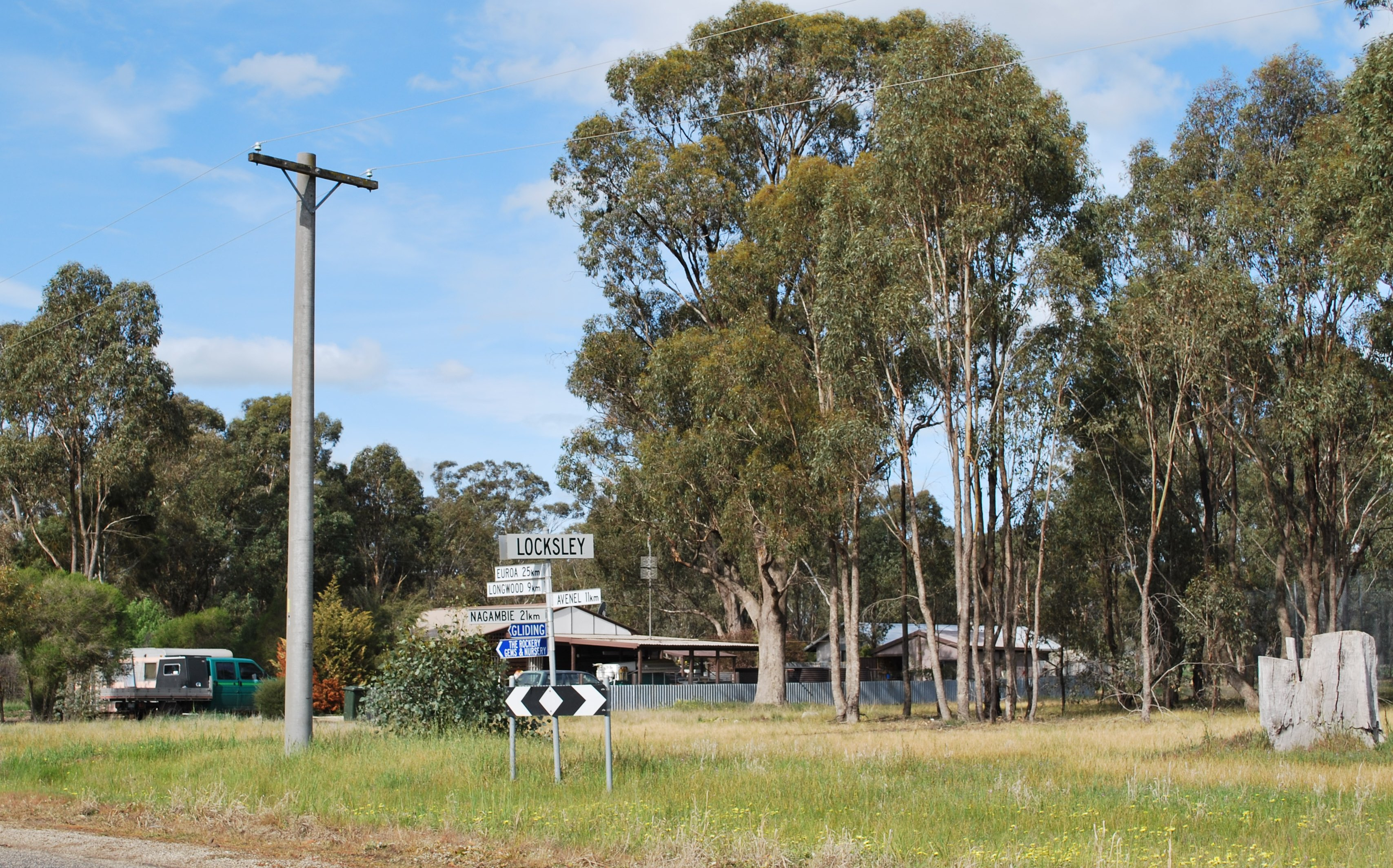
- Street sign at Locksley

- Coordinates: 36°50′S 145°19′E
- Country: Australia
- State: Victoria
- Region: Hume
- LGA: Shire of Strathbogie
- Location: 152 km (94 mi) N of Melbourne; 27 km (17 mi) NNW of Seymour; 23 km (14 mi) SW of Euroa

Government
  - State electorate: Euroa
  - Federal division: Nicholls

Population
  - Total: 131 (2021 census)
- Postcode: 3665

Locksley is a locality in northern Victoria, Australia. The locality is located on the Longwood - Avenel Road (former Hume Highway in the Shire of Strathbogie local government area, 152 kilometres (94 mi) from the state capital, Melbourne). Locksley and the surrounding area have a population of 131. Locksley was originally called Burnt Creek and takes its name from Tennyson's Poem 'Locksley Hall'.

== History ==
Locksley was initially part of Henry Kent Hughes' Avenel pastoral station, taken up in the 1830s and early settlement occurred along Burnt Creek and the hills of Teneriffe. A Cobb & Co coach service along the Sydney to Melbourne road was established with a horse changing station at Barlow's Lagoon, about a mile from Locksley. The Locksley railway station opened in 1882 as Burnt Creek, (changing its name the following year as there was another station of that name in Victoria), with sidings serving up to five sawmills, which were supplying fire wood to Melbourne, and a local hall was built in 1887. In the summer of 1901 a large bush fire started near Locksley which resulted in destruction of many properties and in the following autumn and winter, severe soil erosion was caused in many of the creeks. A post office opened on 1 May 1886, and briefly operated from the Railway station from 1910 to 1914, but closed on 29 September 1973. A butter factory operated for a short while but was closed down and finally sold for removal in 1899.

The Locksley School (No 2648) opened in 1884, originally known as Monea North. The school closed for three weeks in 1899 due to a measles epidemic. It also experienced tragedy in 1898, when the 6-year-old son of Mr. J. H. Sharp died following being struck in the head by a makeshift see-saw.

== Today ==
There are only a few buildings in Locksley today, with the station and school having closed in the 1970s. Locksley has a CFA rural Fire Brigade. Locksley Bushland Reserve has the southernmost occurrence of the rare plant Brachyscome muelleroides (Mueller Daisy).
