= Robin of Loxley =

Robin of Loxley may refer to:

- Robin Hood, a heroic outlaw in English folklore
- Joe Van Moyland (b. 1983), a British musician
