= Regents Academy =

Location
- Bilney Block; Manby Park; Manby; Louth, Lincolnshire, LN11 8UT; England; 53°21′43″N 0°05′38″E

Information
- Type: Private (non-boarding)
- Motto: Nostra Totalitus In Jesu Lacet (Our wholeness lies in Jesus)
- Established: 1992
- Closed: 2017
- Department for Education URN: 120744 Tables
- Ofsted: Reports
- Gender: Mixed
- Age: 3 to 19
- Houses: 4
- Website: http://www.regentsacademy.org.uk

Regents Academy was an independent school based in Manby, Lincolnshire, England. The school was founded in 1992 by Amanda Franklin and her husband, Stephen Franklin, a pastor in a local church. The school admitted both male and female pupils from ages 3 to 19. The school closed in 2017.

== History ==
The original site for the school was in the Franklins' home, Locksley Hall, North Somercotes, Lincolnshire. The school moved to new premises in Manby Park, Lincolnshire in 1995. Manby Park is a business park on the site of a former RAF base. In November 2004 the school expanded, opening a dedicated IT centre in Bowen house, a building next door to the main school. The School later changed name from Locksley Christian School.

Mandy Franklin and the staff of Locksley Christian School created an inclusive environment for staff, students and families in the East Lindsey District. Due to the area being predominantly filled with low-income households, Locksley Christian School was open to accept the typically impoverished and otherwise impecunious families. They went on to accept children of varying special needs to create a safe environment of learning for everyone, receiving local recognition for their service to this community.

== Education ==
Regents Academy used the Accelerated Christian Education curriculum rather than the UK's national curriculum. The qualification gained through this system is the 'International Certificate of Christian Education' which has been designated by the ICCE Board as equivalent to A-level, AS-level, GCSE higher tier and GCSE foundation. The school offered GCSEs in some circumstances. The curriculum used individual workbooks (called PACEs) for each unit of work. At the end of each unit the pupil took a test on which they had to achieve a score of 80% or higher in order to advance to the next unit.

The school was separated into two learning centres based on pupil age and ability. Each learning centre had a supervisor, who provided academic assistance and motivation for pupils, and a monitor who performed administration tasks. A core curriculum included mathematics, English, social studies, science and word building (etymology), provided through the ACE curriculum. Expanded curriculum lessons provide group-based activities in subject areas such as ICT, practical science, creative English, literature, history, art, music, devotions, drama, dance, and physical education.

Regents was affiliated with Christian Education Europe the central body for schools using the ACE curriculum in Europe, and achieved CEE model school status in July 2006. Older pupils competed in the European Student Convention, a yearly event organised by CEE and which featured events in categories including academics, art, drama, music and sport.

Regents provided education for those with special educational needs; a large minority of its pupils had Special Educational Needs statements.

The school had a sports field and a playground. Indoor sporting facilities were provided by a nearby gym hired by the school.

== Houses ==
Pupils were split into four houses named after significant scientists: Kepler (yellow), Faraday (blue), Newton (green), and Pascal (red). Houses competed for points, won through house members completing various achievements.

== Inspections ==
The school was last inspected by Ofsted in February 2011. Ofsted's rates areas of a school as inadequate, satisfactory, good or outstanding. The school achieved at least good in all areas and was rated outstanding in welfare and spiritual, moral, social and cultural development.
