= Locksley railway station, Victoria =

Former railway station in Victoria, Australia

Coordinates: 36°50′02″S 145°19′58″E

Locksley

General information
- Line: North East
- Tracks: 2

Other information
- Status: Closed

History
- Opened: 18 October 1882
- Closed: 1 April 1973
- Former names: Burnt Creek Wood Siding; Burnt Creek

Services
Preceding station	V/Line	Following station
Monea towards Southern Cross	North East line	Longwood towards Albury
List of closed railway stations in Victoria
Location

Locksley is a closed railway station on the North East railway that served the township of Locksley, Victoria, Australia. Opening on 18 October 1882 as Burnt Creek Wood Siding, it was renamed Burnt Creek in 1883, and Locksley in 1904.

Initially a siding surrounded by sawmills, it was not opened to public goods traffic until 1883, with a passenger platform also added. In 1885, a signal box was provided, in 1887 a new passenger platform was erected, and a goods shed was built in 1890, located on down side. In 1898, the station building was destroyed by fire, with a replacement building built within the following year. The station differed to others on the section of line, having the platform fronting onto the mainline, instead of being on a loop siding. In 1904, the mainline was modified to place it through number 2 road, which put the platform on a siding. The final layout was provided in 1916, with three roads and a goods siding. The station closed to passengers on 1 April 1973, and was closed to all traffic in 1977.
