= Whitfield railway line =

Former railway line in Victoria, Australia

Coordinates: 36°47′00″S 146°25′00″E

Whitfield railway
- A Victorian Railways narrow gauge NA Class steam locomotive near Wangaratta on the Whitfield Line.

Overview
- Status: Closed
- Former connections: Albury railway line, Victoria at Wangaratta railway station
- Stations: 17

Service
- Type: Mixed passenger/goods service

History
- Opened: 1899
- Closed: 1953

Technical
- Line length: 30.5 mi (49 km)
- Track gauge: 2 ft 6 in (762 mm)

The Whitfield railway line was a 2 ft 6 in (762 mm) narrow gauge railway located in north-eastern Victoria, Australia, branching from the main North East railway at Wangaratta to the terminus of Whitfield.

The line was the first of four narrow gauge lines of the Victorian Railways. Unlike the other three narrow gauge lines, it was built through mostly flat, open, agricultural country, following the King River. The 30.5-mile (49 km) line was built as a narrow gauge one because it was thought that it might be extended into the mountainous country to the south, although that never happened. One of the proposed extensions was to Tolmie.

The line relied mostly on local agricultural traffic, and opened with a daily mixed train. By the 1930s that had been reduced to a weekly goods service plus daily mail deliveries, and stayed at the reduced level until the railway closed in 1953. There was only one lineside industry, a dairy at Moyhu, and the majority of stations were nameboards at road crossings.

== History ==
=== Before the railway ===
From the 1870s there was a daily coach service between Wangaratta and Oxley, Moyhu and Edi (then known as Hedi), and a mail service to Whitfield (then Upper King River). Prior to the railway opening the entire Ovens Valley region had a population of about 2,000 residents.

In August 1895 a proposal was submitted for a 19.82-mile (32 km) mile long regular broad gauge railway from Glenrowan railway station to Edi, but this was rejected, along with a later proposal for a line from Benalla railway station. The Parliamentary Standing Committee of Railways noted that the Glenrowan proposal would have cost £3,143 per mile, and that the line would cover operating expenses but lose overall after taking into account interest payments on the loan to finance construction, to the tune of £1,830 per year. This report and rejection encouraged residents to consider the reduced cost of a narrow gauge line instead, and the Committee accepted that such a line as far as Edi would probably pay for itself. Additionally, it was argued that an extension to Whitfield would allow farmers from across the tributaries to the King River would bring their produce to Whitfield to enable sales through the northern market regions. Mention was also made of timber demand at the mines in Rutherglen and Chiltern. The Committee at the time noted the land was fairly easy to traverse as far as Edi, difficult beyond that point, and explicitly flagged that the line would eventually be extended to Mansfield but that the cost of a broad gauge railway from Whitfield to Mansfield would be "enormous". Advocacy for a line from Wangaratta started in mid-1896, with a private offer for a private narrow gauge railway following the roadway to Whitfield Post Office, with one intermediate siding at Edi. The line would have been constructed to a gauge of 2 ft (610 mm). Early 1897 saw a proper survey completed, and the line was authorised on 24 August 1897. A further survey in 1898 considered an extension from Whitfield towards Mansfield.

Nonetheless, petitions continued for a broad gauge railway citing the costs and risk of damage to livestock and fragile loads during transhipment at Wangaratta, and on 30 June 1898 the Minister of Railways paid a visit to the area to confirm for himself that the works were being progressed in line with the narrow gauge specifications.

=== Construction of the line ===
Construction started on 1 March 1898, following an instruction on 24 February that the line would be built to 2 ft 6 in (762 mm) gauge instead of 2 ft (610 mm).

Rails were recycled from the Melbourne to Adelaide line, which was then being upgraded for heavier express locomotives and carriages on the Intercolonial Express; construction progressed at a rate of about 30 ch (600 m) per day. The first Baldwin A Class locomotive and six QR open trucks were delivered from Newport Workshops in the last week of September 1899. By 1 October 1898, 2 miles 74 chains (4.7 km) of rails had been laid, and some of the line was ballasted. By 14 October six trucks were being used on construction trains, with another six expected shortly, although delays were feared because sleeper contractors had been late in deliveries. A further nine trucks were provided by the end of November and again by the end of December, for a total of thirty. In February 1899 the second A class locomotive, a U^{U} louvred van, and a paired B^{B} and BD^{BD} passenger and passenger/guards van set were also provided. (Note: Speed Limit 20 Plus notes that one M^{M} cattle van and one ^{N}T^{T} insulated van were also built for the Whitfield line, matching reporting from December 1899, but Vincent notes that 1^{N}M^{M} was partially built in 1899 and held to enter service in 1903; Speed Limit 20 Plus also says that 1^{N}T^{T} entered service on the Gembrook line.) All these vehicles were issued to service without the "N" prefix to indicate narrow gauge; this was appended later, probably around the time the line opened. (Note: In an incident report dated 24 December 1898 the narrow gauge open wagons were still being referred to as "QR" rather than ^{N}QR.)

==== Temporary ballast sidings ====
At least two ballast sidings were provided, likely used during construction and possibly for maintenance after opening.

The first was referred to as Laceby Ballast Pits and was probably somewhere near what would eventually be Docker station; it diverged from the mainline when facing Wangaratta, running north for a length of about 25 chains (503 m) at various downhill slopes before reaching the ballast pit loading sites. On 21 December 1898 during construction of the line, a collision occurred when one wagon, 24QR loaded with rails, escaped the shunter and ran into two others (28QR and 5QR). There was minor damage to both 24QR and 28QR, and they were returned to Newport Workshops for repair. Simpson described the siding as originally extended to Croppers Creek (now Factory Creek), running south-east on the creek side of the road and possibly crossing the creek by a small wooden trestle bridge to access gravel deposits on the far side, although this geometry does not match the orientation of the December 1898 derailment report.

The second ballast siding was about 41 chains (825 m) beyond Edi station; Speed Limit 20 Plus does not say when the siding was built or used, but describes it as running "some length" to the bank of the King River, for sand or gravel. This siding was described by Simpson as running south from the station towards the King River, which would put it in the vicinity of today's Edi Cutting camping ground.

Neither siding appears in the 1927 grades chart, the relevant track diagrams referenced below, or the Weekly Notice transcriptions 1894-1994. The latter source does include mention of eleven other ballast sidings around the state, usually only with reference to the siding being opened and an approximate chainage. Where a closure date is listed, the siding generally remained in use for less than half a year.

=== Line opening ===
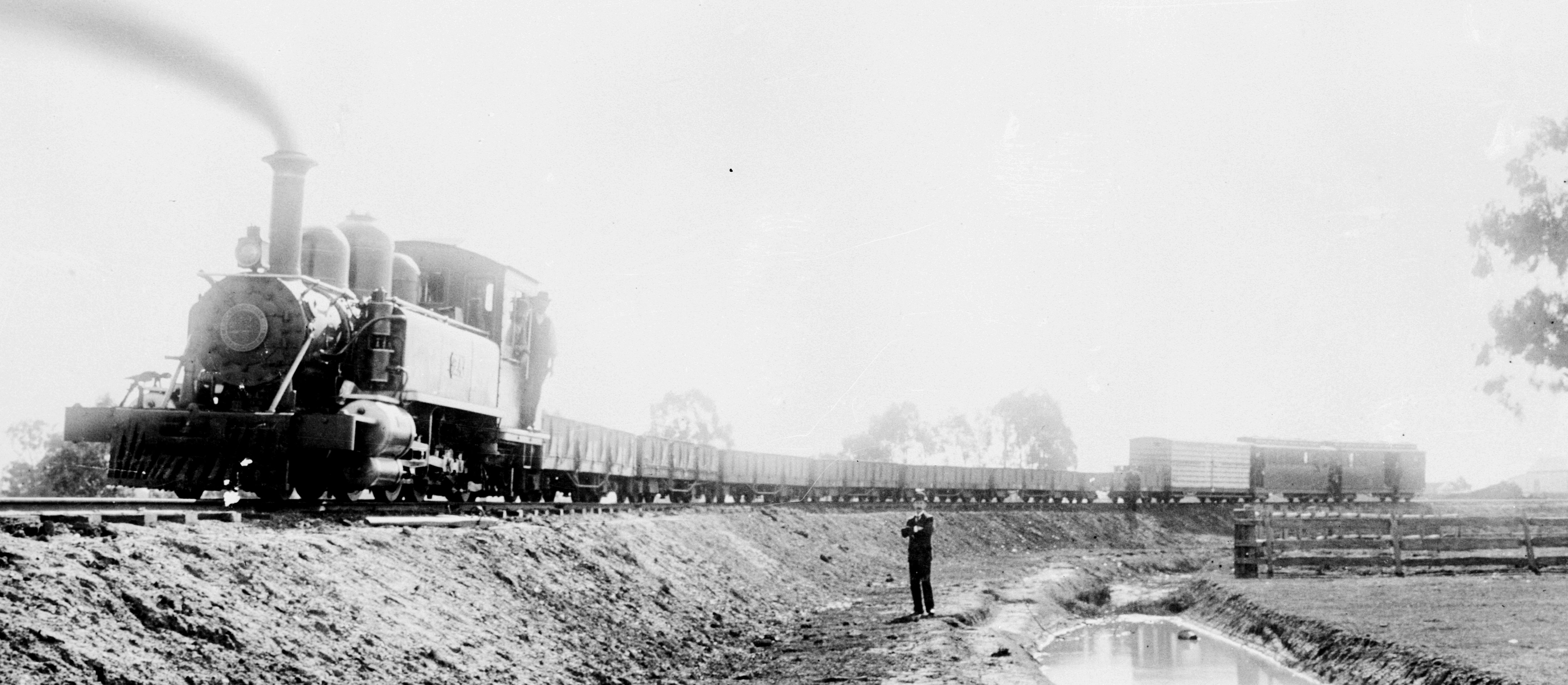
2A with a mixed train consisting of 8x^{N}QR-^{N}U^{U}-^{N}B^{B}-^{N}BD^{BD}, on the Wangaratta to Whitfield line.

The first train left Wangaratta for Moyhu on 11 March 1899, with a special train conveying 114 passengers. 114 tickets (of 300 printed) had been sold for £-/3/3 each at the annual race meeting the prior Wednesday, and the train departed Wangaratta at 12:45pm. The line was officially opened on 14 March 1899 with the first train leaving Whitfield at 8:45am for a three-hour trip each way, returning around 5:30pm. There was no opening event, though a banquet had been proposed.

== Route ==
The line started from the east side forecourt of Wangaratta station, with rails laid in the roadway and a long headshunt extending past the entrance to the main Wangaratta station building. A four-track yard was located to the south of the station, with the mainline down the middle, two sidings on the west for transhipment of goods to and from the rest of the Victorian Railways' network, and one on the east for local goods loading.

During World War II Wangaratta was used as a rest point for troop trains, and portable dining facilities were spread over the narrow gauge yard, with a shelter over the track provided in early 1942. It is not clear whether these troop trains were scheduled at times to avoid conflict with narrow gauge train operations. Beyond the goods yard and the Roy Street level crossing the narrow gauge line diverged for a south-east bearing, passing a siding towards the shared broad and narrow gauge turntable. Any goods between the Whitfield line and the rest of the Victorian Railways network had to be transhipped by hand at Wangaratta goods yard; there were no cranes or other equipment provided to make the task easier or faster, and this added to the operational cost of the line.

Most of the intermediate stations opened with the line, but only a handful had proper names for the first few years of operation.

| Station | Date opened | Original name | Date | Second name | By date | Final rename |
|---|---|---|---|---|---|---|
| Wangaratta | 28 October 1873 | - | - | - | - | - |
| Targoora | 14 March 1899 | Stopping Place No.1 | 14 March 1899 | Clarke | 9 May 1904 | 1 August 1899 |
| Laceby | December 1901 | Stopping Place No.2 | December 1901 | Laceby | 9 May 1904 | 9 May 1904 |
| Oxley | 14 March 1899 | - | - | - | - | - |
| Skehan | 14 March 1899 | Stopping Place No.3 | 14 March 1899 | Skehan | 9 May 1904 | 9 May 1904 |
| Docker | 14 March 1899 | Laceby | May 1899 | Dockers | 21 November 1904 | 21 November 1904 |
| Byrne | 14 March 1899 | Stopping Place No.4 | 14 March 1899 | Byrne | 9 May 1904 | 9 May 1904 |
| Moyhu | 14 March 1899 | - | - | - | - | - |
| Angleside | 14 March 1899 | Stopping Place No.5 | 14 March 1899 | Angleside | 9 May 1904 | 9 May 1904 |
| Claremont | 14 March 1899 | Stopping Place No.6 | 14 March 1899 | Claremont | 9 May 1904 | 9 May 1904 |
| Dwyer | 21 August 1905 | - | - | - | - | - |
| Edi | 14 March 1899 | - | - | - | - | - |
| Hyem | After December 1902 | Stopping Place No.8 | After December 1902 | Hyem | 9 May 1904 | 9 May 1904 |
| King Valley | 14 March 1899 | Stopping Place No.7 | 14 March 1899 | Milne | 14 March 1899 | 27 November 1909 |
| Jarrott | 21 August 1905 | - | - | - | - | - |
| Pieper | After December 1902 | Stopping Place No.9 | After December 1902 | Pieper | 9 May 1904 | 9 May 1904 |
| Whitfield | 14 March 1899 | - | - | - | - | - |

The line ran south-east from Wangaratta through multiple level crossings and beside One Mile Creek, then ran along the western edge of Wangaratta - Mansfield Road and later the King River. The route was relatively flat, with only brief instances of the ruling grade of 1-in-80. Stations along the line were generally either a simple nameboard in a clearing (Targoora, Laceby, Skehan, Byrne, Angleside, Claremont, Dwyer, Hyem, Jarrott and Pieper), or a passenger shelter with a telephone and limited goods facilities (Oxley, Docker, Moyhu, which gained a further siding for a butter factory in 1920, Edi with water tanks, and King Valley).

Byrne was the only intermediate stopping place on the railway, without a shelter shed, which was some distance away from the nearest cross-roads (since Hodges Lane didn't exist at the time). The reason for this was that, during construction, trains had been stopping at both Arklow and opposite the home of a Mr Andrew Byrne. The railway department refused to continue to serve both places, and the midpoint was the agreed compromise. Despite this, few passengers from the Moyhu side used the station. It is not clear where Arklow was, although the survey plans show an unidentified structure opposite the line at approximately 14 mi 3 ch (22.6 km) in John Byrne's land, and a church at approximately 14 mi 66 ch (23.9 km) in Andrew Byrne's land. The midpoint between these two sites is roughly where Byrne's station signboard was eventually built.

In March 1899 only Stopping Place No.1 and 3-7, Oxley, Laceby (later Docker/s), Moyhu, Edi and Whitfield had opened. By 1905 all stations had opened and all the Stopping Places had been given names. In May 1906 Milne (formerly Stopping Place No.7) had been moved about 0.25 miles (400 m) closer to Whitfield, and in August 1908 it was renamed King Valley.

The terminus of Whitfield was the only other substantial yard, with a three-track layout providing the ability to run around trains by the middle track, and locomotive facilities including a two-track timber-framed, iron-clad engine shed beyond the station, which was built in 1900. However, long before the railway closed, engines were habitually stabled outdoors with the shed being used as for parts storage and maintenance.

The Whitfield engine shed was last used to house locomotives in October 1930, after which trains started from and terminated at Wangaratta. The track was cut short from 175 mi 70.87 chains (283.061 km) to a chainage of 175 mi 69.14 chains (283.026 km), and in 1933 the building was leased as Whitfield's motor garage in 1933 and remained as such through the 1980s when it was sold privately.

=== Infrastructure ===
The 1927 grades chart indicates the line was fully fenced, though not in either the post-and-rail or dropper styles, and was provided with combined railway and postal wires along the south side of the line from Wangaratta to Oxley then railway telegraph poles and wires for the remainder of the route to Whitfield.

Maintenance of the line was divided among three crews: one each at Wangaratta, Moyhu and Edi, each provided with three men, three tricycles (two at Edi), and two trolleys, and responsible for a little under 11 mi (17.70 km) of track, including sidings. Tricycles resembled petrol motorbikes fitted with railway wheels in lieu of tyres and no steering mechanism, plus a third wheel on an extended leading axle for the left-hand rail when facing forwards. Trolleys were the same but with two axles and four wheels, and could be loaded with equipment or supplies.

There was a tool shed at Wangaratta and Edi, cattle yards at Moyhu and Whitfield and a combined sheep and cattle yard at Edi, one Departmental Residence (DR) (Note: Departmental Residences were houses owned by the Victorian Railways and allocated to railway employees. As of the early 1960s, they were provided without floor coverings but with blinds for all windows. Station Masters were allocated an annual supply of 6 LT (6.1 t) of firewood, plus either 150 kWh of electricity or 32 imp gal (150 L) of kerosene. The houses were referred to as rent-free, but an annual charge was deducted from the staff members' yearly salary and the rent valuation was included in tax returns.) each at Oxley and Moyhu, another at Edi reserved for a track repair member, and three at Whitfield. Water supplies at Edi and Whitfield were worked by hand pump, and Whitfield was listed as having a motor mail trolley in a shed. The Moyhu departmental residence had been leased to the police department from 1931, and sale to it was proposed in 1949 when the line was first seriously being considered for closure.

As with the other narrow gauge lines, the track was laid using second-hand rails that, when new, weighed 60 lb/yd (30 kg/m), and hardwood sleepers measuring 5 feet 6 inches by 8 inches by 4 inches (1.68 m × 0.20 m × 0.10 m), though by 1927 the sleepers were specified as 5 feet 6 inches by 10 inches by 5 inches (1.68 m × 0.25 m × 0.12 m). Ballast was gravel, to a depth of 4 in (0.10 m). All thirty-three level crossings were provided with cattle grids, to prevent cattle and other animals straying onto the line.

By the late 1940s, there was only one team of four gangers responsible for maintenance of the line. The team worked daily from 7:30am to 4pm, starting from Moyhu and proceeding towards Wangaratta then return. Most of the work was sleeper replacement, with occasional re-ballasting or clearing a landslip at Edi cutting, burning off lineside scrub to reduce fire risk, and annual weed spraying.

==== Siding lengths ====
Aside from the locomotives and compartment NB carriages, all stock on the line was a standardised 27 ft 4 in (8.33 m) over couplers. Siding lengths in this section are measured to ends of track or fouling points, i.e. the limit of where a wagon could be placed before blocking a movement on an adjacent or connecting track, and numbers of the Up and Down end limits of each siding are converted from pairs of miles-chains-links to feet.

During construction, the line had two engines and 30 wagons, and the latter increased shortly thereafter to around 35. The total fleet on the line probably never exceeded 40 vehicles, so a typical train could have comprised over sixty percent of the fleet.

| Mileage | Station | Facilities | Siding lengths | | | |
| Mileage | Station | Facilities | Track | ft | m | Trucks |
|---|---|---|---|---|---|---|
| 145 mi 31 ch 94 li (233.997 km) | Wangaratta | - | Turntable lead (Note: It is not clear from the diagram whether the listed Roy Street level crossing chainage of 145 mi 52 ch 60 li (234.413 km) was the north or south end boundary of the road. This calculation assumes the south boundary; otherwise the width of the road would need to be subtracted.) | 234 | 71 | 8 |
| 145 mi 31 ch 94 li (233.997 km) | Wangaratta | Ash pit | Coal stage (Note: The Wangaratta broad gauge line diagram indicates that some narrow gauge track remained opposite the coal stage until at least 1959. If this is not simply a lack of document revision, the remnants were likely cleared as part of construction of the standard gauge mainline shortly thereafter.) | 58 | 18 | 2 |
| 145 mi 31 ch 94 li (233.997 km) | Wangaratta | - | Transfer ramp | 36 | 11 | 1 |
| 145 mi 31 ch 94 li (233.997 km) | Wangaratta | - | Transfer (East track) | 427 | 130 | 15 |
| 145 mi 31 ch 94 li (233.997 km) | Wangaratta | - | Transfer (West track) | 308 | 94 | 11 |
| 145 mi 31 ch 94 li (233.997 km) | Wangaratta | - | Transfer (Stub siding) | 140 | 43 | 5 |
| 145 mi 31 ch 94 li (233.997 km) | Wangaratta | - | East side Loop | 477 | 145 | 17 |
| 145 mi 31 ch 94 li (233.997 km) | Wangaratta | Shelter over track | Station forecourt (Note: The mileage of the Whitfield line technically started in parallel with the midpoint of Wangaratta station, increasing towards Whitfield and also towards the north-east end of the narrow gauge in Wangaratta yard. This calculation takes the net distance on both sides.) | 490 | 150 | 17 |
| 152 mi 14 ch 46 li (244.911 km) | Oxley | - | Loop | 300 | 91 | 10 |
| 157 mi 61 ch 55 li (253.905 km) | Docker | G.I. Goods shed on platform | Loop | 437 | 133 | 15 |
| 161 mi 65 ch 32 li (260.418 km) | Moyhu | G.I. Goods shed on platform Cattle race | Loop | 513 | 156 | 18 |
| 161 mi 65 ch 32 li (260.418 km) | Moyhu | Platform, various sheds | Butter Siding | 347 | 106 | 12 |
| 167 mi 39 ch 97 li (269.565 km) | Edi | G.I. Goods shed on platform; Cattle race | Loop (Note: The lack of roll-out protection at the down end of Edi may have been because the siding was on a 1:300 slope uphill towards Whitfield, so the risk of a run-away at that end would be minimal.) | 420 | 130 | 15 |
| 171 mi 26 ch 69 li (275.735 km) | King Valley | Goods platform | Loop | 358 | 109 | 13 |
| 175 mi 58 ch 46 li (282.811 km) | Whitfield | G.I. Goods shed on platform; Cattle race | Eastern track | 559 | 170 | 20 |
| 175 mi 58 ch 46 li (282.811 km) | Whitfield | - | Low level platform | 252 | 77 | 9 |

=== Proposed extension to Tolmie ===
As noted above, one of the reasons that the Wangaratta to Whitfield line was built as narrow gauge was to enable a future extension into mountainous terrain, where a broad gauge railway with heavier engineering requirements would struggle. In 1898, after the original line had started construction, a survey was undertaken to extend the alignment from Whitfield to Mansfield, though nothing immediately came of that. In October 1899 the Tolmie Railway League stated that the lack of extension had meant 5,000 long tons (5,100 t) of potatoes could not be brought to market for sale.

The original proposal to extend the narrow gauge line from Whitfield to Tolmie was rejected in 1901, though it re-emerged several times through to a final report on the topic in 1923. According to Simpson (1999), the 1901 report recommended extension to Mahaikah but the Bill for construction was rejected by the Victorian Legislative Council. Had the route been constructed, the projected cost was £65,520 for 19 miles of track, plus land acquisition costs; this line would have used gradients of 1 in 25. It is not clear whether this cost included rolling stock, and it probably did not count operating expenses. The same proposal was rejected in 1903, and a parallel route was also rejected in 1906 because it would compete for traffic with the Whitfield line.

In 1905 the Victorian Railways' then-Acting Engineer in Chief, Mr M. E. Kernot, revived a proposal to extend the Whitfield line, south-west to Tolmie. The route from Whitfield would have continued along the Upper King River for 7 mi (11 km) to Glenmore, then ascended a further 8 mi (13 km) up a 1:25 gradient to McDonald's Gap, proceed to Mahaikah along the ridge of the mountains for 3 mi (5 km) and finally descend 258 ft (79 m) to Tolmie. The proposed line did not serve any major industries or population centres, and would have terminated within 15 mi (24 km) of Mansfield railway station.

In 1908 a new proposal was considered to extend from Whitfield only to Mahaikah, via intermediate parishes of Toombullup, Cambatong, Dueran, Dueran East, Whitfield, Whitfield South and Toombullup North. The projected loss on the line was £2,500 annually, and it would require Government sponsorship to offset the loss. Evidence at the time suggested that tramways were a better use of capital than a fully-fledged railway in districts where timber was the main export, and if that was to be the primary source of traffic on the line then the railway would not be worth building.

Proposals to build the line did occasionally resurface. The Victorian Railways Annual Report to June 1909 lists the 20 mi (32 km) Whitfield to Tolmie extension as being authorized [sic], but not yet having commenced construction. The same is said in the report of the following year, and there is no mention of the extension in the 1911 report.

The District Forester of Healesville found in 1911 that an estimated 25,000,000 board feet (59,000 m^{3}) (Note: Board Feet is the same unit as Super-feet, a volume of 12 by 1 by 1 inch (305 mm × 25 mm × 25 mm), but Wikipedia does not support the latter unit.) of timber could be extracted from the 7,200 acres (29 km^{2}) around a possible McDonald's Gap railway station. After residents rejected this estimate a second analysis, this time by the Chief Inspector of Forests, estimated 1,115,000,000 board feet (2,630,000 m^{3}) of timber from the wider area of 13,000 acres (53 km^{2}). The Conservator of Forests noted an average yield of 10,000 to 12,000 board feet (24 to 28 m^{3}) per acre ready for sawing, which would then be transported by tramway to the railhead; however, he did state that Tatong was a better railhead than McDonald's Gap. Later estimates were that an extended Whitfield to Mahaikah line could expect to convey 2,000,000 to 2,500,000 board feet (4,700 to 5,900 m^{3}) of timber or 6,000 to 7,000 LT (6,100 to 7,100 t) annually, but that this was not justification for the line's extension because the same timber was already being railed on the Tatong line, and the market for local timber had suffered due to reduced mining activity at Chiltern and Rutherglen. Additionally, competition would soon be felt from the New South Wales Government Railways' extension from Wagga Wagga to Tumbarumba; that line opened in stages between 1917 and 1921. The Victorian Railways Commissioners advised that the cost per ton of timber from Tumbarumba to Albury would be comparable to that from Mahaikah, but to Wagga Wagga the Mahaikah line would have to charge more than twice as much. Notably, timber traffic from Tumbarumba could be railed direct to parts of New South Wales, while an extended Whitfield line would have required transhipment at both Wangaratta (from narrow to broad gauge), and again at Albury (from broad to standard gauge).

By this point the Whitfield line was declared a financial failure, and the broad gauge Mansfield and Tatong lines were not significantly profitable either. As required by the Tolmie Railway Act of 1897, a permanent survey was made for a route from Whitfield to Mahaikah via Glenmore and McDonald's Gap in 1912-1913; this line would have been 20 mi (32 km) long, had curves of 2 ch (40 m) radius and grades of 1 in 30, putting it on par with the other narrow gauge lines around the state. The proposal was rejected in 1914, again due to the low revenue potential. Additionally, earlier proposals had assumed easier terrain, but this survey revealed a need for greater earthworks than anticipated, and through much harder stone, which would have required a network of temporary tracks to access construction sites. If built, the new estimate for the extension would have been £148,138, plus land and rolling stock; up from £85,000 in 1908. Aside from terrain, the other factor affecting the price was wage increases over the prior six years. Furthermore, Kernot noted that the original proposal with 1 in 25 gradients would limit haulage to such small tonnages that the line would never break even.

By 1914 the local population had already started to decline, and much of the land taken by "selectors" in 1886 had since been abandoned, with no potential locus of settlement that could be encouraged to grow. Some of the remaining settlers offered to give up their land to the Government to offset some of these costs, but the land offered was found to be useless for settlement purposes due to terrain or inferior soil quality. The Railway Commissioners were asked to re-evaluate the line's potential assuming that all freight traffic, a net of 14,000 LT (14,000 t) per year would be railed as far as Albury, and that Tolmie would support a local population of around 600 residents. The estimate generated was a construction cost of £151,283, with an annual bill across interest, staff, maintenance and other costs of a further £10,069/5/10.

Kernot had considered an alternate route via Hannan's Gap (along Fifteen Mile Creek) but found this to be even less practical, because the terrain was even steeper than the 1913 survey. He also rejected the notion of an extension from Whitfield only halfway up the hill, because the land there was too steep for a safe terminus station. Nor was it practical to extend the broad gauge lines from either Tatong or Mansfield. As such, the Parliamentary Committee recommended against extension of the Whitfield line.

== Rolling stock ==
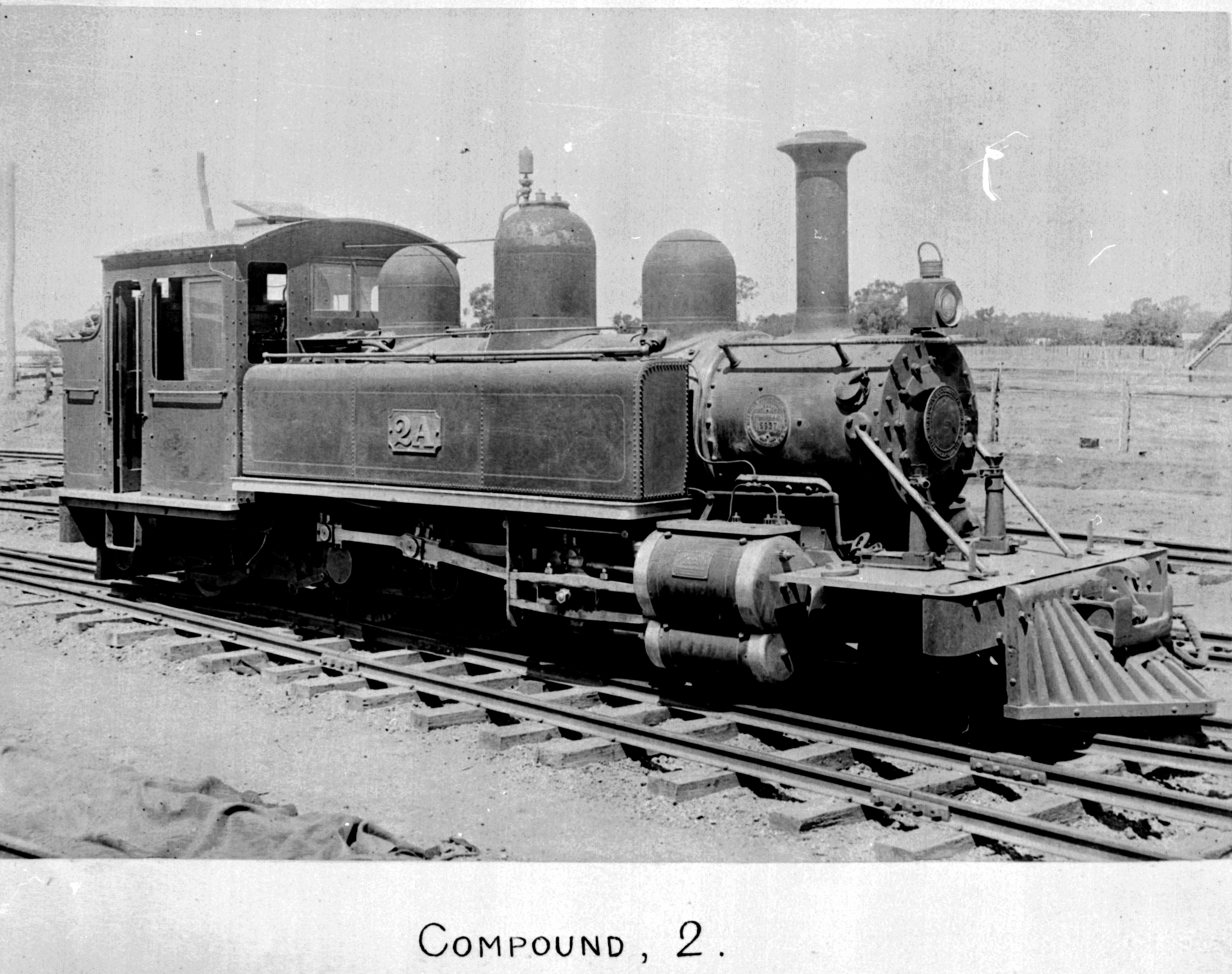
Victorian Railways locomotive 2A at Wangaratta in 1902. This engine worked exclusively on the Whitfield Line.

Engines and rolling stock would have been rotated on an as-required basis, largely to accommodate maintenance requirements that could not be handled on site. As noted above, the original vehicles were delivered with identifying codes equivalent to the broad gauge system, e.g. the open wagons were classed "QR" without distinguishing between those and the broad gauge QR trucks. The locomotives were originally classed "A", and referred to as, for example, "1A (narrow gauge)", though later documents used the class "^{N}A" to distinguish them from various classes of broad gauge "A" class engines. The passenger and goods fleets had an "N" prefix added around the time the line opened, usually but not always as a superscript and in various positions. In 1910 the passenger codes were simplified, e.g. ^{N}BD^{BD} became NBC, and in 1926 the goods fleet codes were similarly altered.

=== Locomotives ===
As noted above the line started with engines 1A and 2A, In December 1902 1A was returned to Newport Workshops for overhaul, then on its return 2A made the same trip, returning at the end of January 1903. During this period the line only had one engine available; on their return both engines had been repainted from the Baldwin green livery to that of the Victorian Railways. In February 1905 1A departed to be used for early construction of the Walhalla railway line, leaving 2A as the only motive power until 7A was delivered fresh from Newport Workshops in May 1905; on its arrival 2A went back to Newport for its second overhaul, returning at the end of August having been repainted again, this time to the Canadian Red livery. 2A and 7A then worked the line alternately.

In April 1906 the second compound engine, 4A, arrived, and about three months afterwards 7A departed. 6A replaced 4A from April 1909 to March 1910, in which time 4A had been working construction trains at the end of the Walhalla line. 6A returned again from May to July 1912 to cover for 4A's overhaul schedule; then in 1920 12A was present from February to July to cover first for 2A and then for 4A.

2A was stored pending scrapping from July 1926 and replaced immediately by 13A, 3A arrived in January 1930 and 4A was taken to Newport in April for an overhaul, but was stored from September 1930 to March 1932. 13A left the line at the end of February 1932 and 4A returned about three weeks later, but it only lasted to October 1933 before being withdrawn from service altogether.

After 4A left, 14A arrived to alternate work with 3A for about half a year, then 3A departed in June 1935 leaving 14A as the only locomotive on the line for nearly five years. 13A returned in June 1940, swapping for 14A, for four years, then it was replaced by 15A in November 1944. 15A worked the line exclusively through to the end of June 1953, when 13A returned for the final few months of the lioe's operation.

Photographs of engines 3A, 4A, 13A, 14A and 15A at Wangaratta and working various trains on the line have been published in Thompson (2002).

Thompson (2018) has reproduced locomotive maintenance data for Wangaratta between 1945 and 1954; this period includes repairs required for engines 13A and 15A. The book shows about one hundred and twenty repair entries for engine 15A between 20 November 1945 and 28 July 1953 (some consecutive), but only three entries for 13A dated 12 July, 4 August and 1 September 1953, with no further narrow gauge locomotive entries to 9 November 1954.

Notably, 2A only ever worked on the Whitfield line, and none of the other narrow gauge lines in the state. Locomotives 5A, 8A-11A, 16A, 17A and the two Garratt engines never worked on the line.

=== Carriages, Trucks and Vans ===
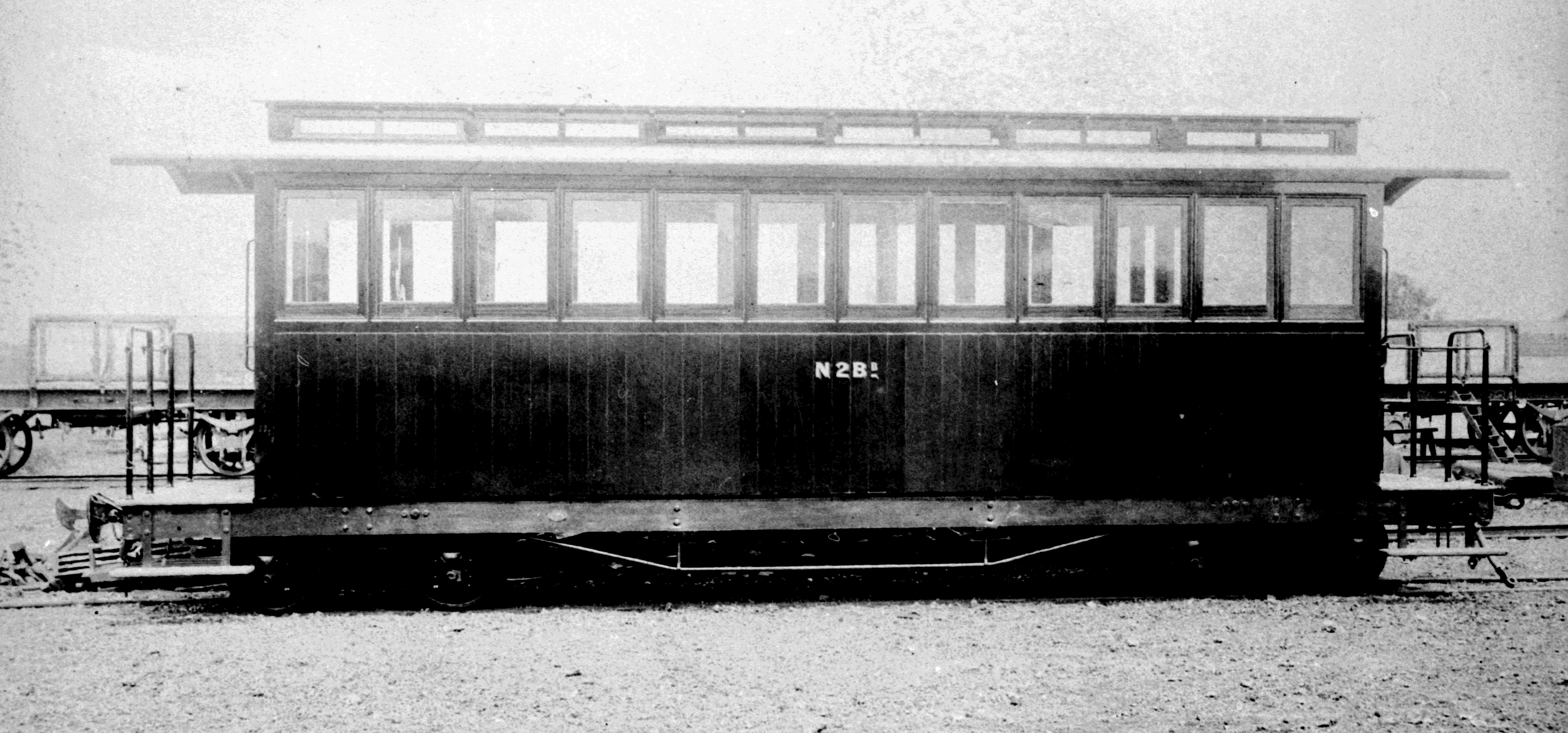
Saloon-type passenger carriage 2B^{B} with N prefix added; later reclassed 2NB.

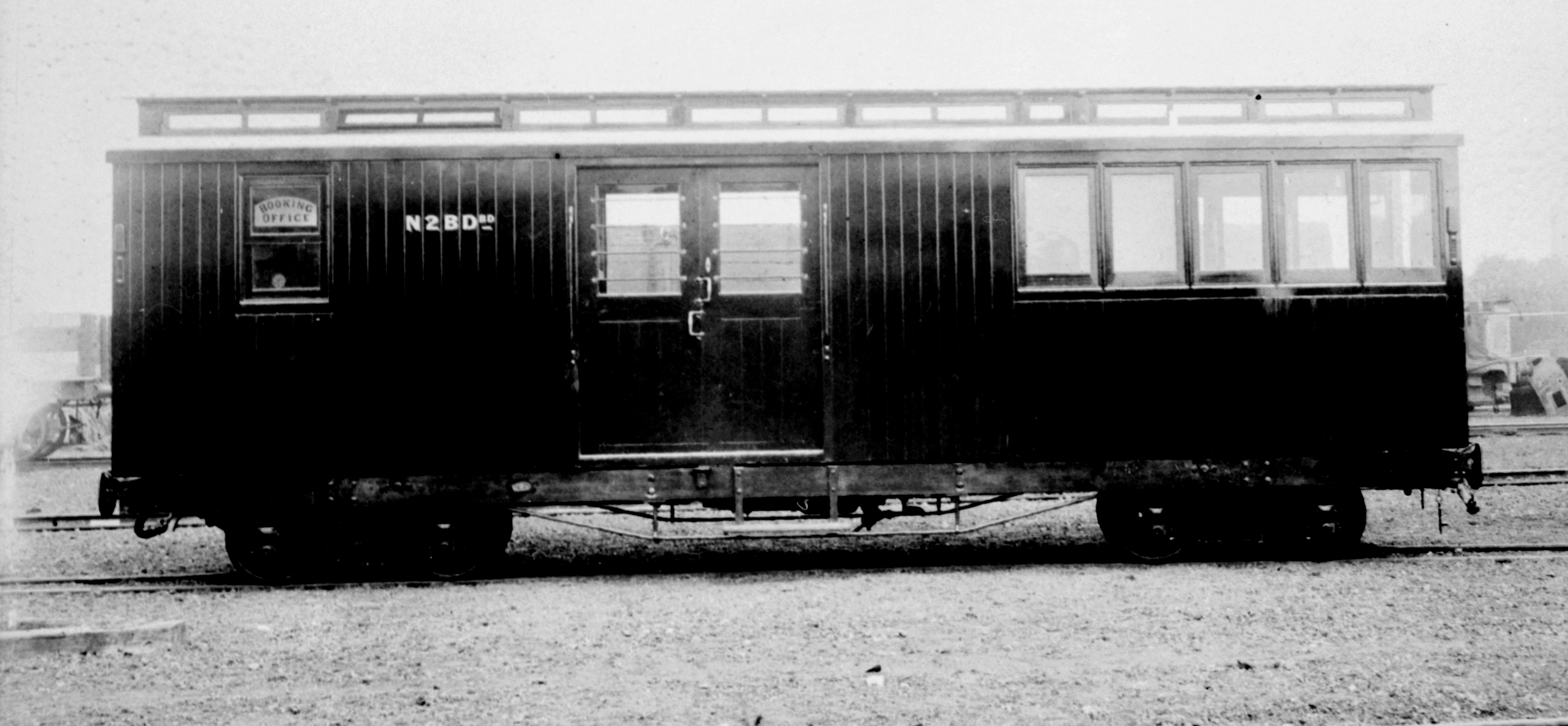
Combined passenger and guard's van 2BD^{BD} with N prefix added. Passengers entered from the ^{N}B^{B} platform through a door at the right end of this carriage. Later reclassed 2NBC.

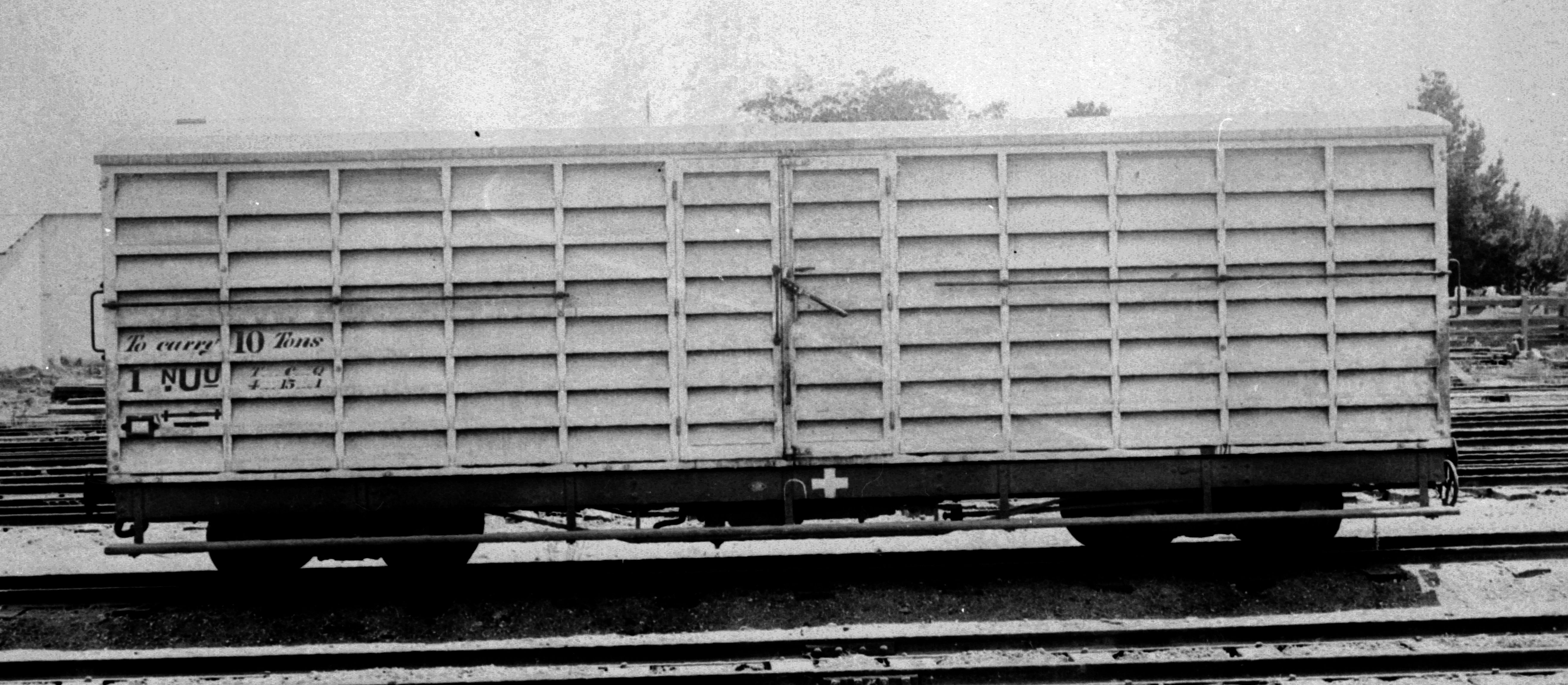
Louvre van 1^{N}U^{U}; later reclassed 1NU. Van 1NH was about the same size, but with smooth sides and two sets of louvred doors per side.

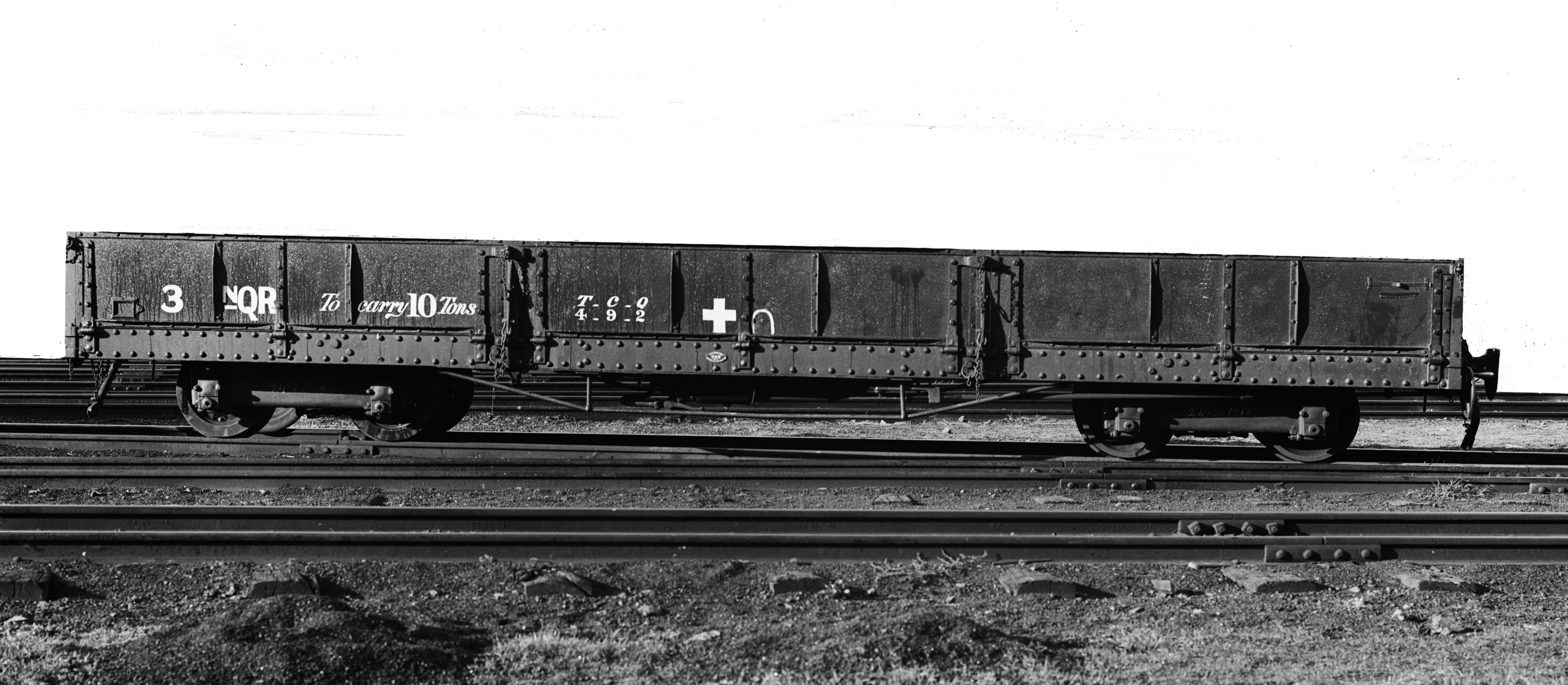
Narrow gauge open wagon 3^{N}QR. Later reclassed 3NQ. These vehicles sometimes ran as flat wagons with sides and/or ends removed.

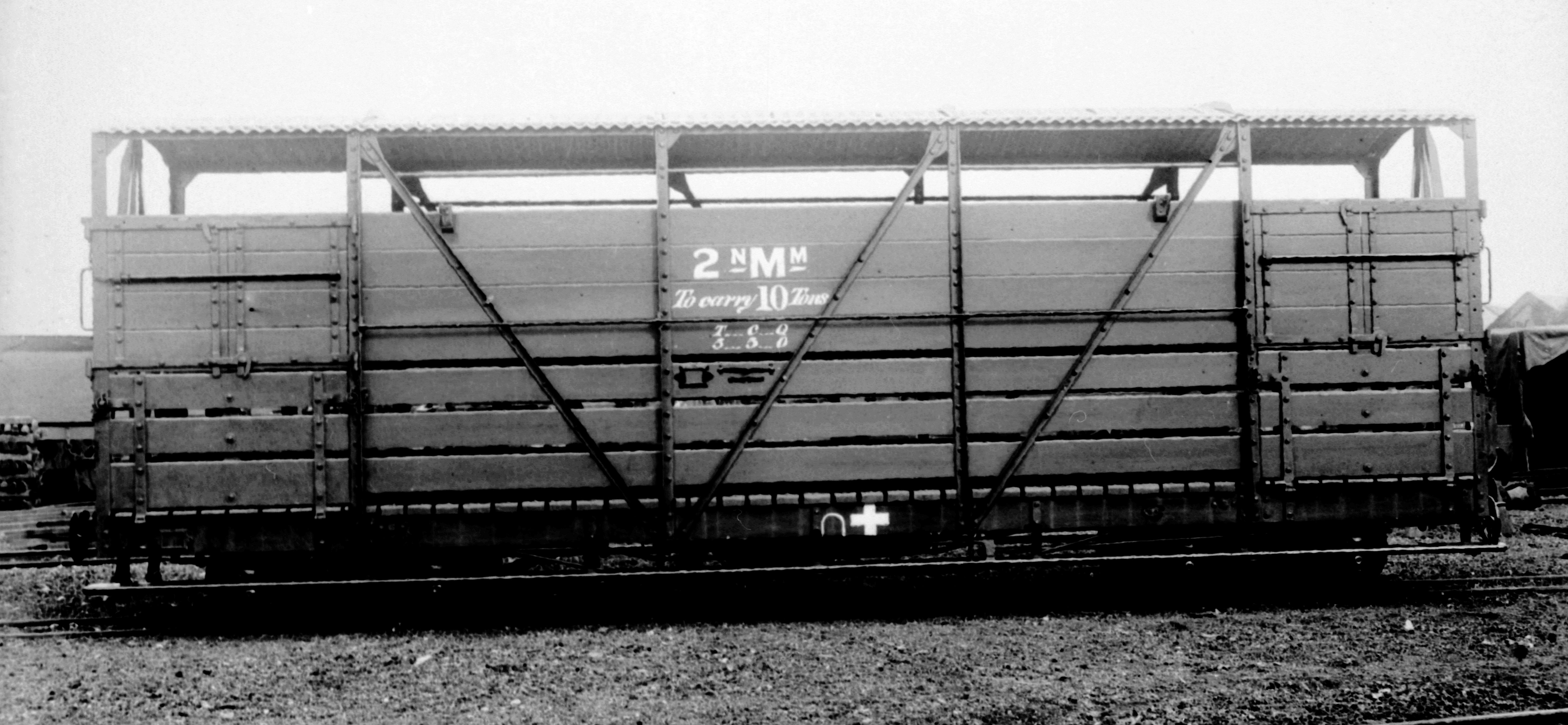
Cattle wagon 2^{N}M^{M}; later reclassed 2NM.

As above, the line opened with 30 open wagons, one louvred van, one passenger carriage and one combined passenger carriage/guard's van.

In 1906 there were at least two passenger cars present on the line; a photo at Edi shows a mixed train towards Wangaratta with engine 2A hauling 1 each ^{N}QR, ^{N}U^{U} and ^{N}M^{M}, followed by two ^{N}B^{B} saloon cars and an ^{N}BD^{BD} van. The latter vehicles were generally arranged in photographs with the passenger compartment at the Wangaratta end. The exception being the photograph thought to be of the first train from Whitfield; if the theory is correct then it shows the van end facing Wangaratta.

Valentine Postcard M 3733 shows one NC guard's van, one NB second-class compartment carriage, (Note: The composite first and second class NAB cars were allocated to the Gembrook and Walhalla lines, and recoded to NB second class by 1923.) and a set of NB-NBC cars parked at the north end of Wangaratta yard, along with at least one NU louvre van. Thompson theorises the photo to date from circa 1920.; it must be after 10 July 1916 and before 13 September 1936 based on the visible shunting signals from the northbound broad gauge dock platform Siding "A" (this signal was originally Post 6A, later Post 18).

Thompson (2018) shows an NB compartment-style carriage present at Wangaratta, but it is not clear when it was provided or how often it was used. Another photo, though undated and at an unidentified intermediate station, shows a train of 1NH, two cattle wagons, a saloon NB then a compartment NB, and an ND van at the rear.

During summer, the end-platform passenger cars often carried large canvas bags on the end handrails to provide drinking water.

A sample consist recorded on arrival at Whitfield on 22 November 1938 was locomotive 14A, 4x NM cattle wagons, 4x NQ open wagons, 1NH, a saloon NB, and an NC van.

In May 1945 one 3am departure from Wangaratta was engine 15A, 11 NQ open trucks, five NM cattle trucks, three NU louvre vans and the NC brakevan, which would have totalled 119 LT (121 t) of tare weight, plus up to 139 LT (141 t) loading. This trip was reported to have reduced the load to seven vehicles (including the guard's van) by arrival at Whitfield, collected one wagon there and another ten on the return journey. At the time, the entire fleet for the line was reported to be the single locomotive and guard's van, 1NH, six NM cattle trucks, 21 NQ open trucks and five NU vans.

When the line was closed a number of trucks were sold off; these included box van 1NH and a range of NU louvre vans; Speed Limit 20 Plus lists the latter as nos 2, 7, 8, 11 and 12NU, while Vincent shows three separate sale contracts, first for 8NU on 21 December 1953, then 2, 5, 7, 11 and 12NU on 18 January 1954, and 9NU also in January 1954 but undated. Speed Limit 20 Plus further notes that 1NH, 8NU and 11NU were sold to the Shire of Oxley as storage units in the council depot at Moyhu; 11NU was subsequently shifted to Wangaratta, and was destroyed by fire in 1978. 2NU was sold to the Whitfield General Store, and has since been preserved at Erica on the former Walhalla line. 1NH was donated to the Puffing Billy Railway in 1968 and 8NU to the predecessor of the Walhalla Goldfields Railway, though it, too, has since been forward to Puffing Billy. Speed Limit 20 Plus records 7NU and 11NU, circa 2017, being stored at Moyhu pending preservation; the latter is most likely 12NU, as Vincent notes 7NU and 12NU stored at Moyhu pending preservation in January 1994.

=== Mail Trolleys ===
While the railway saw reduced goods demand as early as the mid 1910s, the line was still a crucial part of the mail system through the King Valley with the expectation of daily deliveries (Sunday excluded). By 1916 the timetable had been reduced to only four trains per week, so on the off days mail deliveries were catered for by using the track repair tricycles. These would run to the same schedule that the train had previously operated.

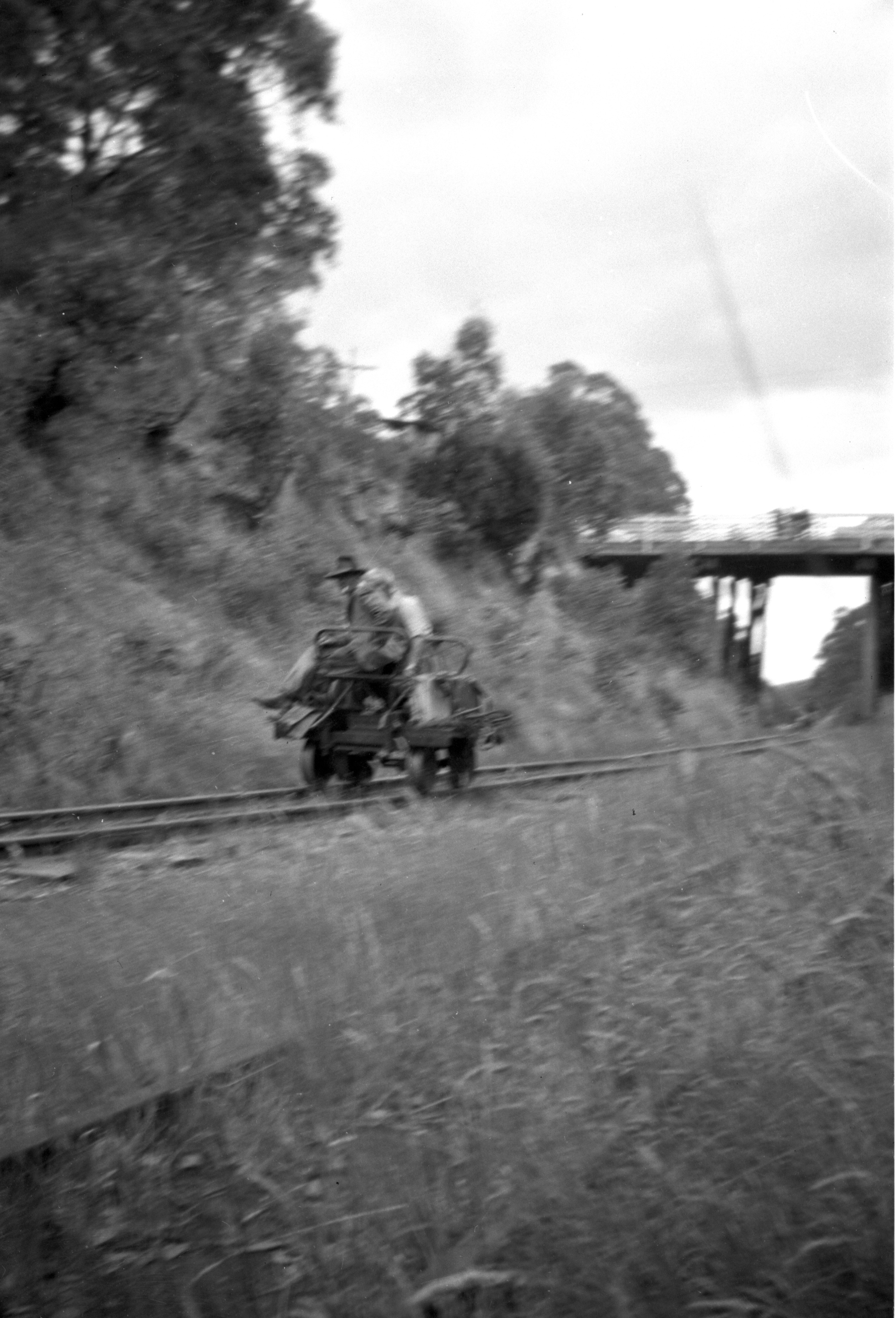
A four-wheel trolly at Upwey in 1955 (Frank Stamford)

When the train timetable was reduced even further, the mail services were upgraded to the use the NKS-class trolley, also known as the Casey Jones Trolley. This was a four-wheel vehicle with a wooden seat mounted over the engine and handrails at either end, with capacity for maybe six people, or 6 long hundredweight (300 kg) of total load, including the weight of the driver. In the event that the trolley service had insufficient capacity, priority was to be given to "Letter mails, parcel post mails, daily newspapeers, weekly papers" in that order; if any were left behind a telegraph had to be sent "promptly" to the Chief Traffic Manager. The trolley was based around a single cylinder, hand-cranked, water-cooled, two-stroke engine with drive to one of its two axles. It could be reversed by stopping the engine, adjusting the magneto and restarting, so it did not need a complicated gearbox or to be lifted from the rails. The service was paid for entirely by the Federal Postmaster-General's Department, and was dubbed the "Chinese Express". The service left Whitfield at 8am, loaded at Wangaratta from 11am to 2pm, then returned to Whitfield at 5pm. Passengers making use of the service had to sign an indemnity form, and would only be permitted if space was available after allowing for the mail and other goods loading. The trolley was limited to speed of 20 mph (32 km/h), although this had to be reduced over bridges and around curves, and to 6 mph (9.7 km/h) when passing over turnouts.

A deputation of residents from Edi requested provision of a railmotor service in July 1928, when the Railway Commissioners visited the region. Consideration was given to a bus replacement service in 1929, and a postal road service in 1932.

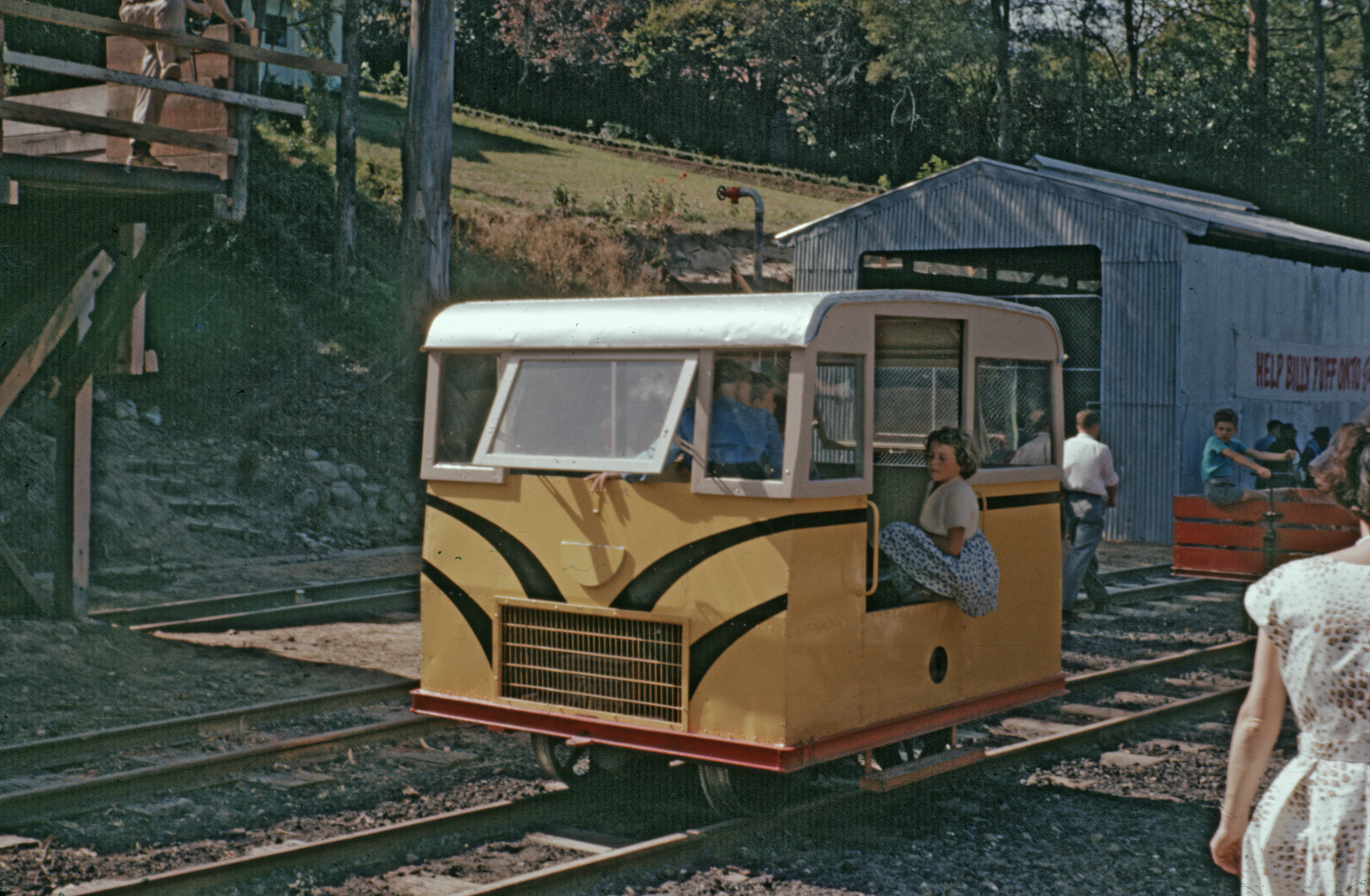
Trolly NK1 at Puffing Billy's new Belgrave station, Victoria, 18 February 1962, after restoration and repainting to yellow with black stripes. The red trailer in the background may also have come from the Whitfield line.

In February 1937 (Note: Thompson 2002 says NK1 was built in 1941, but photos of the final run show a banner indicating a first run in 1937.) a new, larger vehicle was constructed for the service. This may have been in response to a request from Oxley Shire in March 1936 for better passenger accommodation on non-train days, particularly during winter. The new trolley was classed NK1, painted red with white around the windows, and had room for "several" passengers while goods were carried in a trailer. Only the leading axle was sprung, and the drive train was monodirectional so the trolley had to be lifted from the rails on a custom turntable to be turned. This applied at Wangaratta, but also to stable the trolley at Whitfield where the shed was perpendicular to the track at the Up end of the platform. The trailer was stored opposite the shed, between the platform and middle tracks of the yard, also perpendicular to the tracks.

The original driver, Len Forge of Whitfield, suffered carbon monoxide poisoning after driving NK1 for many years, and he was replaced by George Stamp. The service was redubbed the "Spirit of Salts" in reference to the Spirit of Progress train that started operation in late 1937.

NK1 was modified sometime after 14 May 1942 to raise the body above the axles, though the floor height was remained the same.

== Operations ==
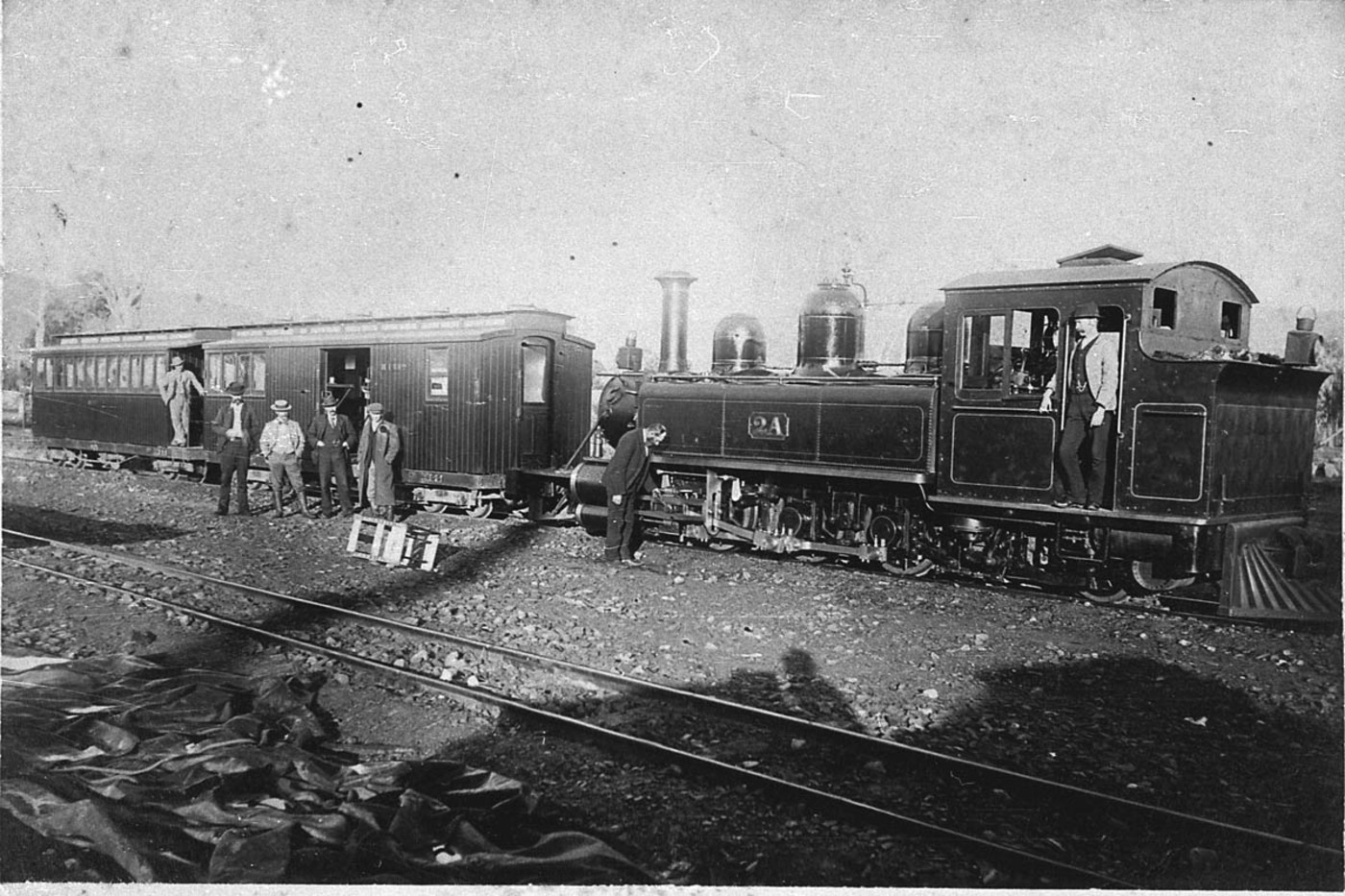
Locomotive 2A with passenger car N1B^{B} and combined car and van N1BD^{BD}.

=== Traffic ===
Inwards traffic to settlements along the line included stock feed, cement and construction materials, superphosphate, general goods, mail and perishables. Outward traffic was an assortment of farming produce including cereals, livestock, wool and dairy, along with firewood. Early traffic also included timber from the upper regions of the King Valley, to support the Rutherglen mines.

By Easter 1919 holiday traffic in the North-Eastern region of Victoria had dropped significantly; for Easter Monday that year 90 passengers were booked on the Beechworth train, 58 to Bright with six more to other stations, and only 22 to Whitfield.

In the mid 1930s there would typically be three vans to unload at Oxley and another three at Docker, and one to drop off in the Moyhu butter siding, as well as beer for the local hotel. Another wagon would be partially loaded at Moyhu then proceed to Docker, so the shunting had to line up the doors correctly. (Note: This was probably van 1NH, which had two compartments.) More empty wagons would be left at Edi and King Valley, then the train would terminate at Whitfield. While there, the crew would unload beer for Whitfield hotel, and collect up to four trucks loaded with timber. Then up to four NM cattle trucks would be placed at the Up end of the train, and cream from local farms would be collected in an NU van. On the return trip pigs were picked up from the intermediate level crossings (with the NM trucks positioned to make it easier for the locomotive driver to know where to stop), and assorted farming produce like linseed, millet and (in autumn) maize would be loaded. At Moyhu the return train would drop off the cream and pick up the freshly loaded butter wagon. Coming into Wangaratta the pigs were unloaded at what is now Hume Highway, then the train would continue into Wangaratta. There, the butter wagon's loading was immediately transhipped to pre-iced T vans on the broad gauge, and other goods for Melbourne would be placed in the transfer sidings, and the rest of the wagons would be distributed as required. Only one staff member at Wangaratta was employed specifically to help with the transhipment task, so other station staff members often had to help out. However, the narrow gauge line was laid such that the floor of its wagons was the same height as the adjacent broad gauge wagons, making the transhipment task somewhat easier; and each broad gauge four-wheel wagon had the same volume capacity as a bogie narrow gauge wagon. Example loads for manual transhipment included 76 bags of superphosphate per wagon, or up to 7 LT (7.1 t) of timber which had to be moved across "stick by stick".

Cattle from the line was railed to Newmarket Saleyards in Flemington, while sheep and pigs were sent to the Wangaratta markets in Ovens Street. Animals were unloaded at Wangaratta in the station yard or the Roy Street level crossing, and had to be shepherded either to the saleyards or to broad gauge wagons. For the latter, Wangaratta's original broad gauge cattle sidings had been situated opposite the railway station and west of the former station footbridge; in 1923 a new set of broad gauge cattle sidings were provided about half a mile south of the station, but the narrow gauge line was never given a direct connection. Most of the other traffic was superphosphate, drums of fuel, wire and other farming supplies.

By the 1940s the traffic was mostly limited to heavy, bulky items that could not easily be transported by truck and trailer, such as timber, grain and large fuel drums. Loads like bagged superphosphate would be delivered to stations en route, then collected by farmers using horses and carts. This proved particularly challenging if the steam locomotive was working hard, as the black smoke clouds would terrify the animals. Farmers from as far afield as Bobinawarrah and Carboor would use the train for deliveries.

The maximum load for a steam-hauled train was 265 LT (269 t); this would give a maximum loaded train length of about sixteen vehicles, or perhaps 25 empty wagons, depending on the specific consist. The maximum train length was defined as 25 vehicles.

Edi was the only intermediate location where engines' water tanks could be refilled. "Many a time", a train would be abandoned without notice between Moyhu and Edi so the locomotive crew could sprint to Edi to refill the water, then come back and recover the train. The four water tanks at Edi each had a capacity of 600 imp gal (2,700 L), but they had to be refilled by manual pump from bore water and during summer that would only work for half an hour at a time, so the local crew members had to time their activities such that enough water was available for the engine on the return trip as well. Water at Whitfield was supplied by gravity, so pumping was not necessary.

The line was colloquially referred to as "The Whitty", and as the engines were given the moniker "Pollys", Wangaratta Yard became "Polly's Yard".

=== Services ===
==== Opening timetable ====
Trains were originally considered to start and end at Whitfield, with Wangaratta as the distant terminus. The original timetable showed a mixed train running from Whitfield to Wangaratta and return daily except Sunday, departing 8:45am and leaving Wangaratta at 2:30pm.

The schedule was varied occasionally; for example on 26 December 1902 and 1 January 1903, the Dpwn train from Wangaratta (by then a 4:30pm departure) was held until 6:30pm to cater for event traffic.

The Up train was No.1 on Thursdays or No.2 on other days, and the Down was No.1 all days.

Passengers on these mixed trains would generally ride in either an NBC combined van and passenger carriage, or a saloon-type NB carriage coupled to an NC guard's van, until the passenger service ceased on 21 October 1930. After this date passengers, if any, were generally accommodated in the guard's van or the passenger compartment of an NBC van if available; this arrangement was known as a "Car Goods". Photos after this date do occasionally show an NB carriage at Wangaratta or on trains, but it would only have been used if required and was not advertised.

Early in the line's operation some special excursion trains had run to Edi, using open wagons temporarily converted to carry passengers as regularly happened on other lines.

==== Thursday Sales ====
By 1 May 1906 the to-Wangaratta schedule was permanently altered, with the Thursday train moved to a 7:30am departure from Whitfield for arrival at Wangaratta at 10am, while Monday, Tuesday, Wednesday, Friday and Saturday trains retained the 8:45am–11:15am run, in response to complaints from locals that the regular timetable gave insufficient time at the Thursday market sales in Wangaratta. The schedule for the Thursday train would be made earlier again by 1910, to a 6:50am–9:20am trip.

The Thursday afternoon train was altered from the 3pm Wangaratta departure to 4:40pm from 29 June 1911, on the suggestion of the Wangaratta station master.

==== Service cuts ====
In May 1913 the service was reduced to only four return trips per week. On Mondays, Tuesdays and Saturdays the 6:50am train from Whitfield arrived at Wangaratta at 9:20am, turned then departed 3pm for 5:30pm return, while on Thursdays the schedule was 8:45am–11:15am, then 4:40pm–7:10pm.

In 1916 the Thursday morning train to Wangaratta had shifted to the 6:50am–9:20am slot, while the Monday, Tuesday and Saturday trains had been moved to 8:15am–10:45am. The return Thursday schedule was still in place, but the other three days had been pushed half an hour later to 3:30pm-6pm. Additionally, Wednesday and Friday services had been reinstated by provision of a Postal Motor service using track maintenance trolleys or tricycles, leaving Whitfield 6:10am for arrival 9:10am, and returning 1:20pm–4:20pm.

The Saturday Mixed train was cancelled in January 1918, and the postal motor changed to run on Tuesday and Thursday in lieu of Wednesday and Saturday.

By March 1928 a policy change had all Up trains given even numbers, and all Down trains odd numbers. Therefore, the Postal Motor was now No.2 Up and No.1 Down, and the steam trains were No.3 Down and No.4 or No.6 Up. At this point the steam trains were only operating on Thursday and Saturday, with postal motors covering the rest of the week. The Thursday train (No.4) left Whitfield at 8am for a 10:45 arrival, while the Saturday train ran from 6:40am to 9:20am.

New timetables issued in July 1929 showed the Postal Motor No.4 on Mondays, Wednesdays, Fridays and Saturdays with times 7:45am–10:45am then 1:20pm–4:20pm, with the steam train as No.2 on Thursdays 6:35am–9:25am or No.6 on Tuesdays 8am-10:45am, both returning as No.3 Mixed 4:40pm–7:30pm. By March 1931 the Tuesday train had been cancelled, and the Thursday train reclassed as a Goods service as passenger accommodation had officially been withdrawn on 21 October 1930. The goods train from Wangaratta on Thursdays had been rescheduled to depart 40 minutes earlier, at 4pm.

Residents of the King Valley region continued to write to the Railways Commissioners asking for their daily service to be restored, and cancellation of the Saturday Mixed train was a topic of complaint from early 1928 through to 1929.

Later in 1931 the goods train schedule changed from Thursday to Tuesday, and rescheduled to start from Wangaratta at 3:30am, shunt at Whitfield from 4:20am to 7:15am then return at noon. The mail trolley service ran daily except Tuesdays, leaving Whitfield 8am and Wangaratta 1:30pm daily except Tuesdays.

In October 1931 a dedicated milk train to Moyhu was introduced on Thursdays, with a guarantee from Hansen Dairy Company and Holdensen & Neilson for a proportional share of £45 per trip. This service was cancelled four months later, restored September 1932 to February 1933, and again for the summers of 1933-1934 and 1934-1935. It did not operate again until the summers of 1939-1940 and 1940-1941. When it operated the Thursday postal motor service times were adjusted to suit

Around 1939 the Postal Motor service was increased to six days per week, Sunday excluded.

==== Coal shortages ====
The working time table for March 1940 shows Tuesday (Whitfield, No.1 and No.6) and Thursday (Moyhu, No.3 and No.4) goods trains, with the Postal motor (No.2 and No.5) operating six days per week (excluding Sundays). Both the postal motor and goods train were scheduled to depart Whitfield at 8am, with a note that the goods train would follow the postal motor "at a suitable interval as locally arranged". Similarly, on Thursdays the postal motor was not to depart Moyhu until after the goods train had left. This was short-lived however, as a coal shortage from 1 April 1940 forced cancellation of the Whitfield goods service leaving only the weekly Moyhu trains. Another cut two weeks later saw the postal motor deleted from Tuesday, Thursday and Saturday schedules until 22 May 1940, when those trips were restored.

During the coal shortage period the Whitfield trains were sometimes reduced to operating fortnightly, in addition to the weekly Moyhu goods.

A motor bus service was provided along the main road in the late 1940s.

The Spirit of Salts rail trolley service carried 5 to 6 passengers daily, plus 30 to 40 packages of mail and papers, fresh produce for the Whitfield store, and charged sixpence for meat deliveries. Most traffic was to and from any point along the line, rather than specific stations, and tickets were generally not bothered with. Occasionally pregnant women would use the service to travel to Wangaratta hospital to give birth, as there was no other facility in the region.

==== Winding down ====
On 10 November 1947 the Working Time Table showed a return to Tuesday Whitfield, Thursday Moyhu goods trains, and the Postal motor was to run all days except Tuesdays. On Thursdays passengers and mail from the Up Postal service would transfer to the train at Moyhu. There was an attempt to cancel the Postal service in October 1949, but the Chairman of the Victorian Railways Commissioners cancelled the order before it could be implemented. The 1950 service was the Tuesday goods and the Tuesday-excluded Postal motor.

A bushfire started at a sawmill in Benalla on 5 February 1952 and spread to a significant portion of the King Valley region, stopping just short of Oxley. The bridges beyond Moyhu were damaged, and the bridge at Angleside was completely destroyed and required replacement before the Spirit of Salts could resume running. Trains could not proceed past that point and the Tuesday goods service was truncated. Complaints were made to the Department by the Australian Primary Producers Union and the Whitfield Ratepayers Association. (Note: Simpson says the postal service from Moyhu to Whitfield was reinstated from 17 March 1953; this was most likely 1952, given the schedule published in July 1952 below.)

A schedule published 28 July 1952 (and preserved until 1965 in the Wangaratta locomotive depot) showed a Tuesday-only goods service, leaving Wangaratta 7am for Moyhu 9am then returning 10am-12pm, plus the postal motor departing Whitfield 9:15am, arriving Wangaratta 12:15pm for 2pm departure using a Train Staff Ticket, and 5pm return, except on Tuesdays. On Tuesdays the arrangement was for the postal motor to leave Whitfield at 8:30am, travelling without the Train Staff or a Train Staff Ticket, and terminate at Moyhu at 9:50am. The driver of the postal motor was to communicate with the Signalman at Wangaratta, who would also advise the train crew of the potential conflict, but at Moyhu the onus was on the postal motor driver to not enter the yard until given authority by the guard of the steam train. Mail and passengers would be transferred between the two at Moyhu. The postal motor was then instructed to proceed from Moyhu to Wangaratta under the standard rules for track machines, in order to return by the normal schedule.

Despite advocacy from residents to Oxley Shire and agitation for a full restroation of the Goods trains to Whitfield, the line was closed on Monday 12 October 1953, with the last goods train on 6 October and the last postal motor on 10 October. A eulogy was read for the line prior to the final departure of the Spirit of Salts from Whitfield.

=== Safeworking ===
The line was always operated under the Train Staff and Ticket safeworking system as one block, meaning only one train was ever allowed to run on the line at any given time. In April 1899 this was made more restrictive with the Tickets withdrawn, therefore trains had to complete return trips without the possibility of a following train. Wangaratta and Whitfield were provided with arrival Home signals on 29 September and 13 November 1913 respectively, and the intermediate stations' turnouts were upgraded from hand locking bars and padlocks to staff locks by 28 August 1916. A Master Key was provided for the line in March 1926, which may indicate the reintroduction of Train Staff Tickets as trains operating on Tickets would otherwise have no ability to shunt at intermediate sidings.

The maximum track speed was 20 mph (32 km/h), increased from the design speed (on curves at least) of 15 mph (24 km/h), Unofficial reports recorded higher speeds, particularly on the long straight sections of track.

=== Incidents ===
Aside from the abovementioned derailment at Laceby ballast siding, mention is also made early in the line's operation of a truck escaping Whitfield yard during shunting. The line is mostly downhill from there to Wangaratta, and the engine crew gave chase but did not catch up to the wagon until Claremont - a distance of about 11 miles (18 km). Apparently the event was observed by the Edi schoolteacher, who raised an alarm.

On 7 May 1908 locomotive 4A, operating its last trip to Wangaratta before a scheduled trip to Newport Workshops for maintenance, lost a bolt near Lake Como (about 1.25 miles (2.01 km) from Wangaratta station). A phone call was placed from the local church to Wangaratta station, and cabs were organised to transport passengers for the final length in order to connect with a broad gauge express train. The engine was repaired and continued its trip, arriving nearly an hour late. It was forwarded to Newport the following day. A similar failure occurred on 13 February 1911, when the train to Wangaratta, with 35 passengers on board, developed a fault at Edi and became disabled at Claremont. In this case the engine was patched with a bar of iron and arrived at Wangaratta an hour late, then a spare part was taken from the other engine there to make good for the return trip (which ran two hours behind schedule).

On 20 June 1911 the train from Wangaratta was delayed due to an employee switching the points under the locomotive, such that the leading bogie was on one track and the rest of the engine on another. A crew was sent from Benalla to help lift and re-rail the locomotive, and the 30 passengers were accommodated by the Wangaratta station master in the interim.

Another locomotive failure was reported on 4 February 1916, when the engine developed an unspecified mechanical fault near Dockers and could not be repaired. The crew ended up taking a cab back to Wangaratta, having called ahead and organised for the Beechworth train's fireman to light up the second narrow gauge locomotive so that they could perform a rescue. The train with passengers continued to Whitfield, arriving four hours late.

Flooding on 10 May 1918 washed out 10 ch (660 ft; 200 m) of line near Moyhu and washed out 20 ft (6.1 m) of the Edi Cutting to a depth of 10 ft (3.0 m), causing cancellation of that Tuesday's train.

A derailed truck at Oxley on 17 April 1919 caused passengers to miss their connection to the broad gauge express train from Wangaratta to Melbourne by over an hour; it is possible that this incident influenced the later decision to carry rerailing gear on the buffer beams of the NA Class locomotives.

== Closure and legacy ==
February 1952 saw significant bushfires that damaged the line and forced the service to truncate at Moyhu, with NK1 and its trailer being used to take any traffic beyond that point. This required replacement of the two burned bridge, which was accomplished with a skeletal trestle style in lieu of the normal timber deck for ballasted track that the Victorian Railways generally used. The Whitfield line was the first of the narrow gauge lines to close, with the last train from Wangaratta to Moyhu and return on 6 October 1953 and the last postal motor running on 10 October. The line was officially closed on 12 October 1953. The Victorian Railways cited the reasoning as motor traffic and the growth of Wangaratta as a trading centre for farmers, leading to decreasing traffic on the line. The line never made a profit; its best year was 1924 with a loss of only £3,990.

=== Remaining elements ===
Tenders for the removal of rails were invited in 1956, and the following year the rails had been extracted and shipped overseas. In the early 1960s the former facilities at Wangaratta were demolished to make way for the Standard Gauge route from Albury to Melbourne, although some track in the station forecourt was simply paved over. That track was revealed and excavated in April 2010 when the roadway was reconstructed. The shelter appended to the front of Wangaratta station, which coincidentally covered the narrow gauge track, was still in place as late as 1961 even as construction progressed on the standard gauge cutting.

Most of the line's mileposts survived after closure, although many have been shifted over time to make room for road widening. The station signboard for Oxley was recovered and reinstated in 1968, and Whitfield's sign was relocated to Puffing Billy's Menzies Creek museum. Replica nameboards have since been provided at or near most other locations. As of 2017, three Departmental Residences (one each at Oxley, Moyhu and Whitfield) remained standing, having been sold privately in the early 1970s. The Whitfield engine shed was leased to a car garage business and remained standing, though derelict, in 2017.

The Spirit of Salts trolley had been sold to the Puffing Billy Preservation Society, being delivered in May 1961. It was renovated and painted bright yellow with black stripes, and later fitted with a new engine to allow it to haul loaded trailers on the much steeper gradients of that line. It was used as a track inspection vehicle, until it collided with locomotive 6A hauling the 12:10pm train from Emerald, on 10 January 1970 near the School Road level crossing. The locomotive derailed but the trolley was written off.

=== Whitfield to Wangaratta Rail Heritage Trail ===
In the 2000s a Whitfield to Wangaratta Rail Heritage Trail was proposed, which would have followed some of the former railway route, but it never developed beyond an on-road trail which roughly paralleled the route. The path opened between Wangaratta and Oxley in 2010. The Wangaratta Walking and Cycling Strategy for 2020-2030 included funding to investigate the extension of the rail trail from Oxley to Cheshunt with intermediate stages to Moyhu (high priority), Edi, King Valley and Whitfield (all medium priority).

== See also ==
- Narrow gauge lines of the Victorian Railways
