= Wangaratta railway station =

Railway station in Victoria, Australia

Wangaratta
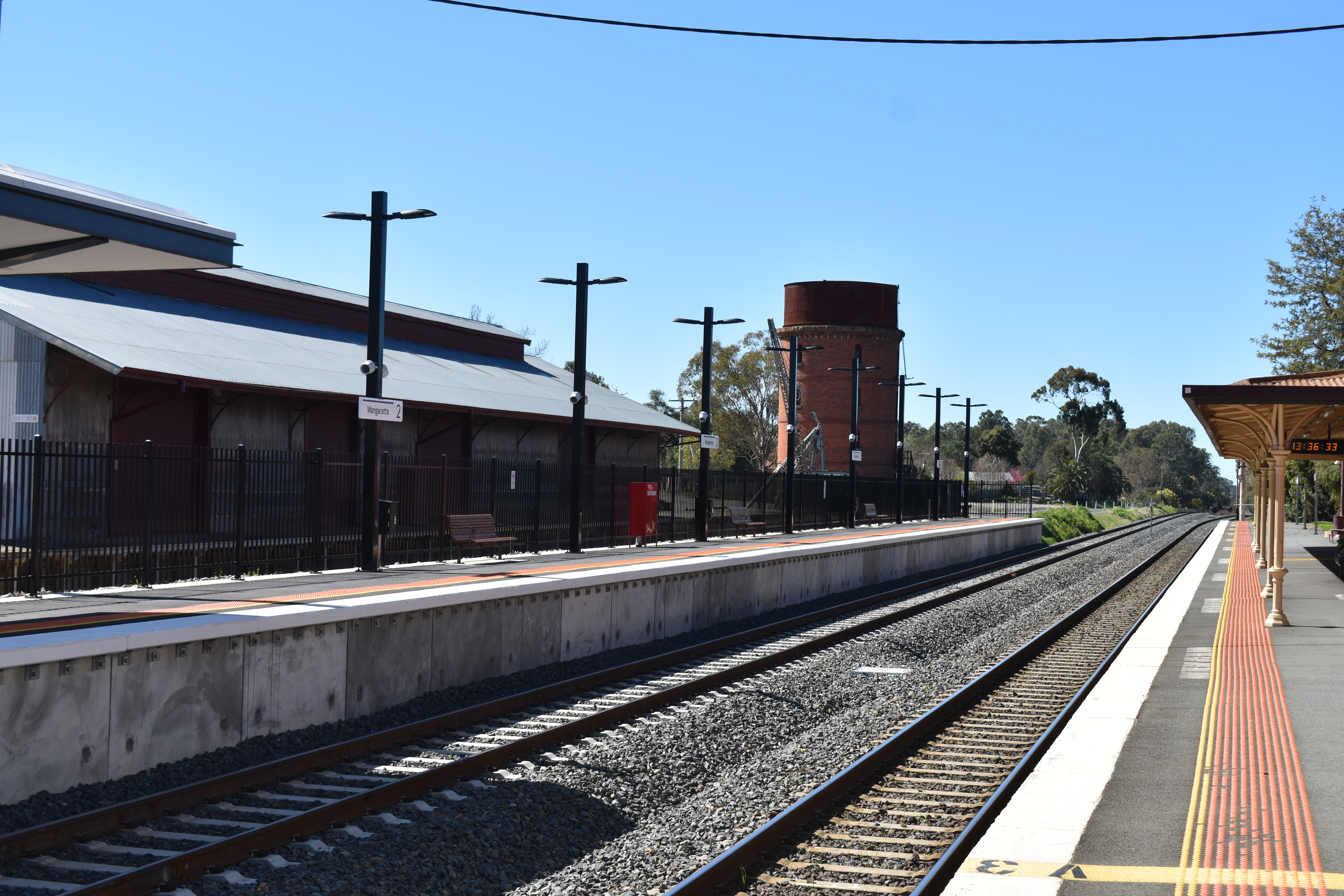
- Northbound view from Platform 1, September 2025

General information
- Location: Spearing Street, Wangaratta, Victoria 3677; Rural City of Wangaratta; Australia
- Coordinates: 36°21′18″S 146°19′01″E
- System: PTV regional and NSW TrainLink inter-city rail station
- Owner: VicTrack
- Operator: V/Line
- Line: Albury Southern (North East)
- Distance: 234.00 kilometres (145.40 mi) from Southern Cross
- Platforms: 2 side
- Tracks: 2
- Connections: Bus; Coach

Construction
- Structure type: Ground
- Parking: Yes
- Cycle facilities: Yes
- Accessible: Yes

Other information
- Status: Operational, staffed
- Station code: WAG
- Fare zone: Myki zone 19/20
- Website: Public Transport Victoria

History
- Opened: 28 October 1873; 152 years ago
- Rebuilt: 27 May 2025; 14 months ago

Services
Preceding station	V/Line	Following station
Benalla towards Southern Cross	Albury line	Springhurst towards Albury
Preceding station	NSW TrainLink	Following station
Benalla towards Melbourne	NSW TrainLink Southern Line Melbourne XPT	Albury towards Sydney
Former service
Preceding station	Disused railways	Following station
Junction	Whitfield line	Towards Whitfield
Location
- Location within Victoria

Wangaratta railway station is a regional railway station on the North East line, it serves the town of Wangaratta, in Victoria, Australia. Wangaratta is a ground level staffed station, featuring two side platforms. It opened on 28 October 1873, with the current station provided in May 2025.

== History ==
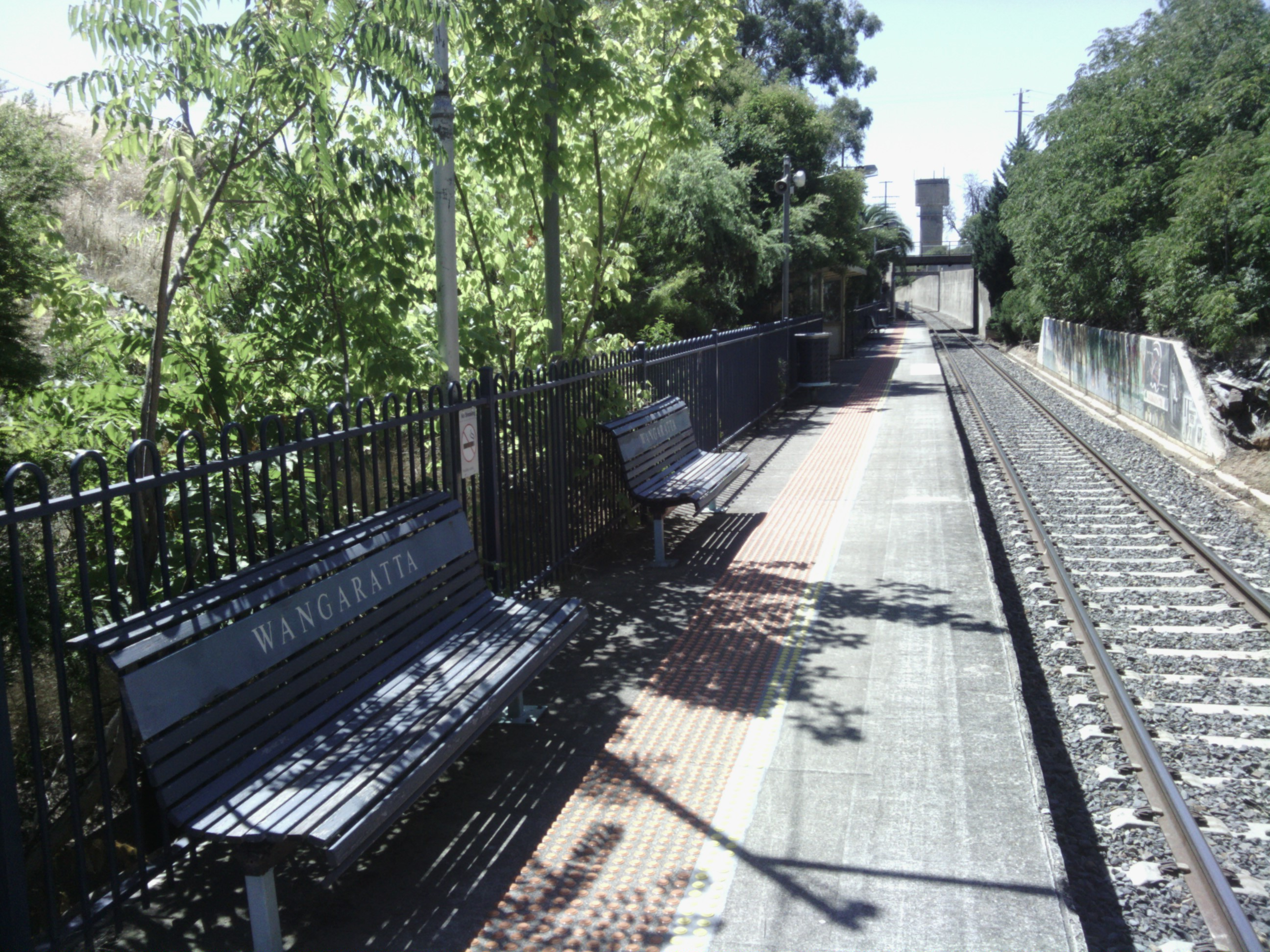
Northbound view of the eastern platform, March 2015. Built to serve Sydney-Melbourne passenger trains on the original standard gauge line, the platform was demolished and replaced by a new platform to the west of the existing station as a part of Inland Rail works

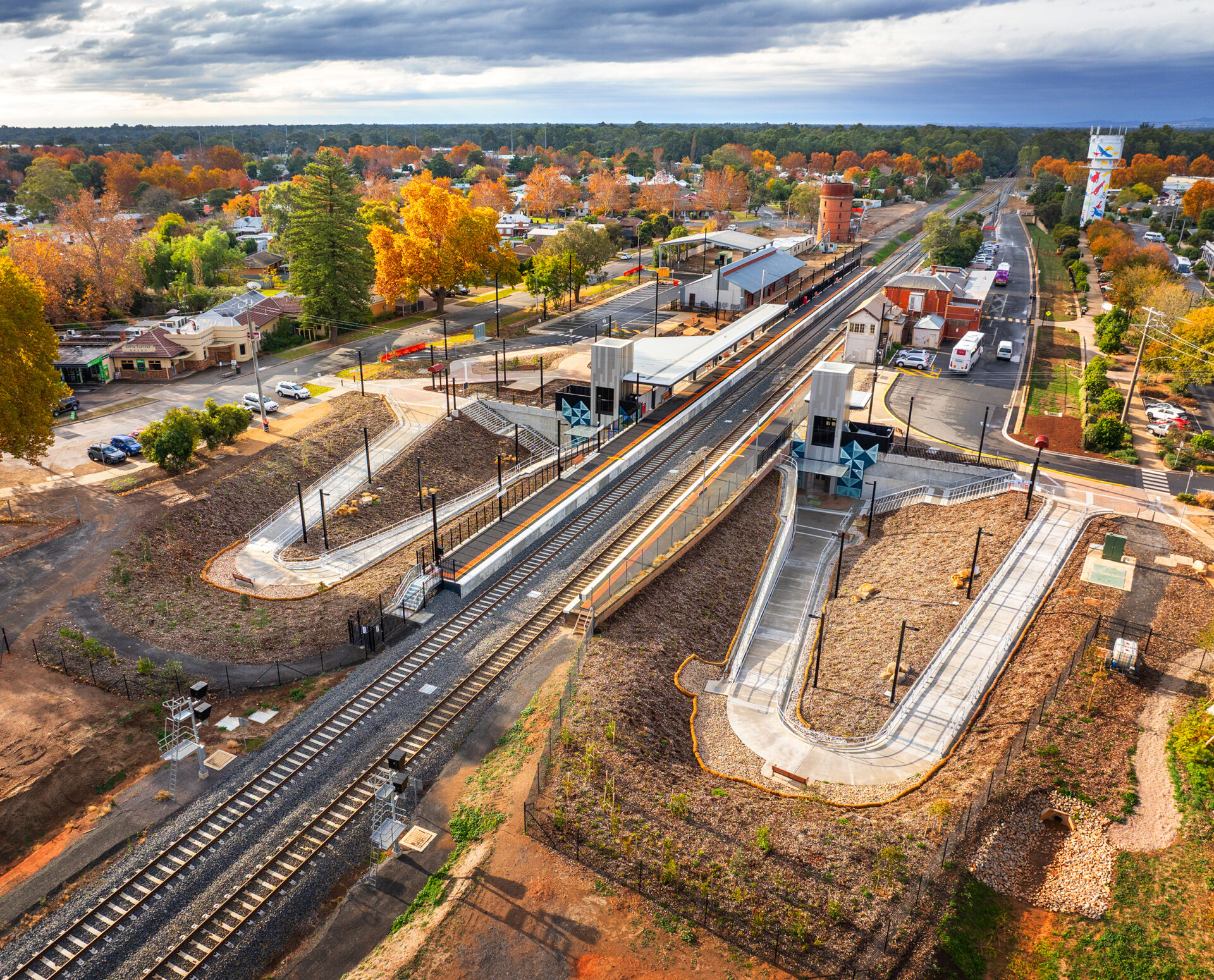
Wangaratta Station Precinct, May 2025, taken on behalf of Inland Rail Pty Ltd (used with permission).

When Wangaratta opened, it was the temporary terminus of the line from Benalla, before it was extended to Wodonga on 21 November 1873.

A goods shed is located across from the main platform, but has no siding, and the goods shed office was demolished in 1978. Dock platforms were once located at both ends of the station. There are footbridges at both the south end of the platform and over the northern end of the yard.

The main platform and station building is located to the east of the standard gauge "West" line. The original standard gauge line runs in a concrete walled cutting, located between the station and adjoining street, with a number of bridges crossing this cutting to provide station access (this cutting was completed by mid-1960). The platform on the standard gauge "east" line runs through a cutting at the Melbourne end of the station. Alumatta Loop, on the original standard gauge line, used to be to the south of the station, past the Sisely Avenue level crossing, but it was booked out of use in February 2011, and was removed shortly afterwards.

Initial facilities at the station included a goods shed and a temporary station building. A brick station building, identical to that at Benalla, was opened in 1874, with a two-storey brick tower added at the Melbourne end in 1897. A large signal box was provided in 1887, and extended in 1908, when the goods yard was expanded and the current goods shed provided.

A small locomotive depot was provided in 1882, with a dual gauge 50-foot (15 m) long turntable provided in 1898. Wangaratta was the junction for the Whitfield 2 ft 6 in (762 mm) narrow gauge railway line, which opened in 1899, branching from the main line at the southern end of the station. That line was closed in 1953.

When the Albury - Melbourne standard gauge line was constructed to the east of the station in the early 1960s, extensive works were required to thread it through the former narrow railway reserve. The locomotive depot and turntable were relocated from the east side to the west side of the line, and new grade separations were provided at Rowan Street to the north, and Roy Street to the south.

In 1962 requests were made to the Victorian Railways for provision of a new standard gauge siding; the Railways responded that they were willing to provide one, but it had to provide at least two bogie wagons with 14 long tons (14 t) of loading each, per day. The siding was never built.

In 1965, siding "D" was abolished.

In 1973, minor modifications were made to the station building. In 1977, the oil siding at the station was abolished.

During 1984, the passenger facilities in the main station building were refurbished, and were re-opened on 9 November of the same year.

In 1989, the cattle siding and siding "F" were abolished. Further sidings were abolished in 1992, including sidings "C" and "J", as well as a number of dead-end extensions and points.

During June/July 1997, the Wangaratta signal box was abolished. Signalling and interlocked points were also abolished at that time.

In 1998, former New South Wales regional passenger operator, CountryLink, rebuilt the standard gauge platform. The works included replacing the original deck with a steel one, covered with a concrete surface, refurbishing the platform shelters, and installing new lighting, fencing, seating and bins.

During the 2011, as part of the conversion of the broad gauge line to standard gauge, all remaining sidings were disconnected. The station now has no loop or non-platform tracks, and is essentially only a "through" station.

Former stations at Winton and Glenrowan were situated between Wangaratta and Benalla, while the former station at Bowser was between Wangaratta and Springhurst.

== Platforms and services ==
Wangaratta has two side platforms, with platform 2 being opened in April 2025 as part of Inland Rail works.

It is served by V/Line Albury line trains, and NSW TrainLink XPT Sydney to Melbourne services.

Wangaratta platform arrangement
Platform	Line	Destination
1	Albury line NSW TrainLink Southern	Southern Cross
2	Albury line NSW TrainLink Southern	Albury, Sydney

== Transport links ==
Fallons Wangaratta operates two bus routes via Wangaratta station, under contract to Public Transport Victoria:

- 401 : Wangaratta – West End
- 403 : Wangaratta – Yarrawonga Road

V/Line operates road coach services from Wangaratta station to Bendigo, Corowa, Bright and Beechworth.
