= Tatong railway line =

Former railway line in Victoria, Australia

Tatong

Overview
- Status: closed, track removed
- Owner: VicTrack
- Termini: Benalla; Tatong
- Connecting lines: North East
- Stations: 5

History
- Opened: June 30, 1914
- Closed: April 27, 1988

The Tatong railway line was a railway line in North Eastern Victoria, Australia, branching off of the North East railway line at Benalla railway station. It was opened on June 30, 1914 and was fully closed on April 27, 1988.

== History ==
The line was opened on June 30, 1914 primarily to bring farm produce and logs from the Tatong sawmill to Melbourne. By 1920, a horse drawn tramway was constructed in Tatong to transport wood from the two sawmills located in Tatong to the station however, in January 1938 the horse tramway was removed and by March 1943 the turntable and siding were both abolished as well. The line beyond the Vacuum Oil siding was closed in 1947 however the line remained open for freight to the Vacuum Oil siding until 1988 when the entire line was closed to all traffic.

== Line Guide ==
Branched from the North East railway line at Benalla Station

- Vacuum Oil Benalla siding
- Karn
- Lima
- Mallum
- Tatong
