= Yackandandah railway station =

Former railway station in Victoria, Australia

Yackandandah

General information
- Coordinates: 36°18′32″S 146°50′34″E
- Line: Yackandandah
- Platforms: 2
- Tracks: 2

Other information
- Status: Closed

History
- Opened: 23 July 1891
- Closed: 2 July 1954

Services
Preceding station	Disused railways	Following station
Beechworth	Yackandandah line	Terminus
	List of closed railway stations in Victoria	
Location

Yackandandah railway station is the closed terminus station of the closed Yackandandah line located in the northeastern Victorian town of Yackandandah. The station has been completely demolished but the former station site at Yackandandah has been used as a Council depot. Remains of the former platforms can still be made out.
