= Londrigan railway station =

Former railway station in Victoria, Australia

Coordinates: 36°20′11″S 146°25′02″E

Londrigan

General information
- Line: Bright
- Platforms: 1
- Tracks: 1

Other information
- Status: Closed

History
- Opened: 7 July 1875
- Closed: 13 April 1987

Services
| Preceding station | Disused railways | Following station |
|---|---|---|
| Bowser | Bright line | Tarrawingee |
| | List of closed railway stations in Victoria | |
Location

Londrigan railway station was a railway station on the closed Bright railway line in Victoria, Australia. Although no trace of the former station exists, a signboard has been erected to mark the site of the station as part of a rail trail project.
