= Peechelba East railway line =

Former railway line in Victoria, Australia

Peechelba East

Overview
- Status: closed, track removed
- Owner: VicTrack
- Termini: Bowser; Peechelba East
- Connecting lines: North East
- Stations: 3

History
- Opened: October 31, 1927
- Closed: December 8, 1986

The Peechelba East railway line was a railway line in North Eastern Victoria, Australia, branching off of the North East railway line at Bowser railway station. It was opened on 31 October 1927 and closed on 8 December 1986.

== History ==
The line was opened on 31 October 1927, to serve soldier settlers in the area. Although it was about 5 miles (8 km) from Peechelba, on the other side of the Ovens River, the terminus was originally named Peechelba. The Country Roads Board and three local shires contributed to the cost of a bridge linking Peechelba with the new station, renamed Peechelba East in March 1948. The line was closed to all traffic in December 1986, along with many other lines elsewhere in the state.

== Line Guide ==
The line branched from the North East railway line at Bowser station. There were only two stations.

- Boorhaman
- Peechelba East
