= Yackandandah railway line =

Former railway line in Victoria, Australia

Overview
- Status: converted to Murray to the Mountains Rail Trail
- Owner: Victorian Railways
- Termini: Everton; Yackandandah
- Continues from: Bright line
- Stations: 4

Service
- Operator: Victorian Railways

History
- Opened: Everton-Beechworth: 30 September 1876; Beechworth-Yackandandah: 23 July 1891
- Closed: Yackandandah-Beechworth: 2 July 1954; Beechworth-Everton: 30 December 1976

Technical
- Line length: 37.1 kilometres
- Track gauge: 1,600 mm (5 ft 3 in)

The Yackandandah railway line was a railway line in Victoria, Australia, constructed by the Victorian Railways. It was one of the earliest branch lines constructed in Victoria. The line served the major regional town of Beechworth, which had been active in campaigning for the main rail route into New South Wales to run via the town.

That was not to be and the line to Beechworth was built as a branch from the North East line at Bowser, opening on 30 September 1876. An extension opened to Yackandandah on 23 July 1891. The line was already running at a loss six months after it opened. The extension to Yackandandah closed on 2 July 1954, and the section between Everton and Beechworth on 30 December 1976. The section between Bowser and Everton, which was also part of the Bright line, remained open until 13 April 1987.

In the 1990s, the route of line between Bowser and Beechworth became part of the Murray to the Mountains Rail Trail. In September 2018, work commenced on a $6.2 million project to extend the rail trail to Yackandandah.
