= Tarrawingee railway station =

Former railway station in Victoria, Australia

Coordinates: 36°22′26″S 146°29′54″E

Tarrawingee

General information
- Line: Bright
- Platforms: 1
- Tracks: 1

Other information
- Status: Closed

History
- Opened: 7 July 1875
- Closed: 31 July 1977

Services
| Preceding station | Disused railways | Following station |
|---|---|---|
| Londrigan | Bright line | Everton |
| | List of closed railway stations in Victoria | |
Location

Tarrawingee railway station is a closed railway station of the closed Bright railway line in Victoria, Australia, serving the town of Tarrawingee. The station closed to all traffic on 31 July 1977.

A station sign board and shelter have been erected at Tarrawingee as part of the rail trail project, as a reminder of the former station.
