= Everton railway station =

Former railway station in Victoria, Australia

Coordinates: 36°24′17″S 146°32′39″E

Everton

General information
- Line: Bright
- Platforms: 1
- Tracks: 1

Other information
- Status: Closed

History
- Opened: 7 July 1875
- Closed: 13 April 1987

Services
Preceding station	Disused railways	Following station
Tarrawingee	Bright line	Brookfield
Terminus	Yackandandah line	Beechworth
	List of closed railway stations in Victoria	
Location

Everton is a closed station of the closed Bright line which served the town of Everton, Victoria. Everton was the former junction station for the Yackandandah line. The station begain operating in the 1870s, and would close down 100 years later as the Yackandandah line and Bright line shut down. Only the platform remains at this station where a new shelter and toilets have been built as part of a rail trail project. A plaque and commemorative buffer stop have also been erected on the platform.
