= Bowser railway station =

Former railway station in Victoria, Australia

Bowser
- Former station site in September 2026

General information
- Coordinates: 36°19′06″S 146°21′51″E
- Line: North East

Other information
- Status: Closed

History
- Opened: 7 July 1875
- Closed: 13 April 1987

Services
Preceding station	VicRail	Following station
Wangaratta towards Spencer Street	Albury line	Springhurst towards Albury
Terminus	Bright line	Londrigan towards Myrtleford or Bright
Terminus	Peechelba East line	Boorhaman towards Peechelba East
Location

Bowser is a closed railway station located just north of the city of Wangaratta, on the North East line, in Victoria, Australia. It served as the junction for the Peechelba East and Bright branch lines. The location was finally abolished as a block point after the conversion of the broad gauge line to form a centralised traffic control double track railway in 2010.

== History ==
The railway through the station north to Wodonga opened in November 1873, but the station did not come into being until September 1875, when work began on the branch line to Beechworth. The station opened to traffic as Beechworth Junction on 7 July 1875, and was renamed Bowser in 1922, after John Bowser, a local politician and former Premier of Victoria.

The station buildings dated to 1890, but interchange of goods traffic between the branch and main line was handled at Wangaratta, six kilometres to the south. In 1927, the station became a three-way junction, when the line to Peechelba East was opened. Freight facilities included bulk grain storage, livestock loading ramps, and a fertiliser store. Passenger facilities were not provided until 2 February 1891, and the station was closed to passenger traffic on 1 October 1972.

Bowser closed entirely on 13 April 1987, when the line to Everton (the last section of the Beechworth line) closed. The signal box was abolished during the same year, along with all points and signals, the former grain storage, and the disestablishment of the station as a staff station. Despite the line to Everton officially closing on 13 April, the standard gauge crossing had been dismantled in February of that year. The Peechelba East line had closed a year earlier, in 1986.
