= Glenrowan railway station =

Defunct railway station in Victoria, Australia

Coordinates: 36°27′46″S 146°13′26″E

Glenrowan
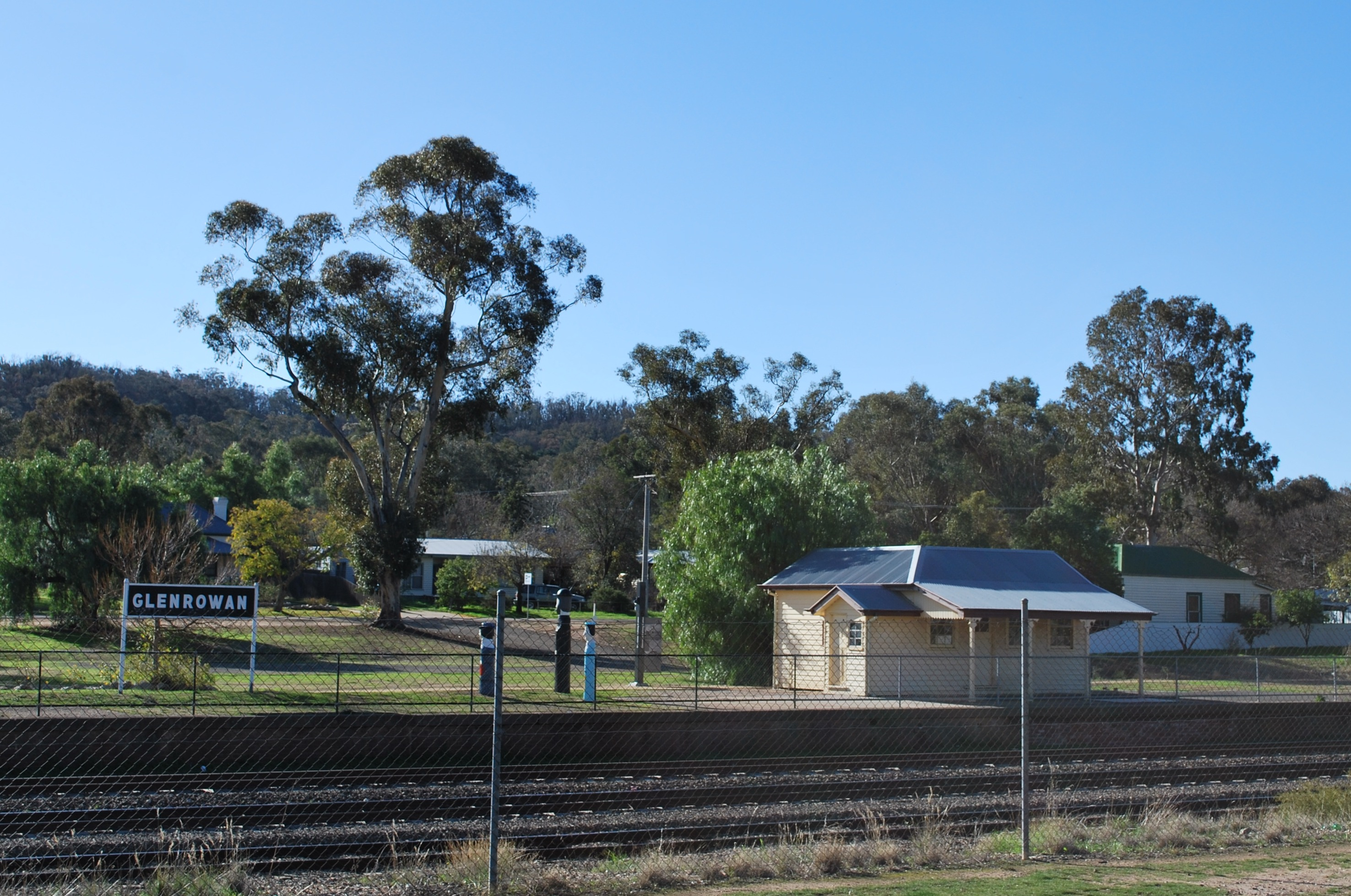
- Northbound view of the reconstructed station building in June 2009

General information
- Line: North East
- Platforms: 1
- Tracks: 3

Other information
- Status: Closed

History
- Opened: 2 November 1874
- Closed: 4 October 1981

Services
Preceding station	V/Line	Following station
Winton towards Southern Cross	North East line	Wangaratta towards Albury
List of closed railway stations in Victoria
Location

Glenrowan is a closed station located in the town of Glenrowan, on the North East line in Victoria, Australia. The station is located at the highest point of the line north of Seymour, with grades of 1 in 75 in both directions. In June 1880, the station was the site of what became the last stand of Ned Kelly and his gang, with a monument located at the station today.

== History ==
The station site was initially a ballast siding, but there were no plans to build a station at the site. However, an earth platform was provided for construction workers, and when this was removed by the contractors, several protest meetings were held by local residents. The petition was successful, and a station was opened on 2 November 1874, with a platform located on the western side of the line. A temporary station building was provided, with the sidings extended in 1901.

Permanent station buildings were provided in 1911, of Edwardian style, along with relocation of the signalling frame, and the platform was extended to 350 feet (110 m). In 1961, the yard was altered to permit the parallel standard gauge line to run through, with the broad gauge main line altered to run through No. 2 road, with the platform on a loop siding. The goods siding was relocated to the western side of the line, and a quarry siding running east from the station was converted to standard gauge. The Beaconsfield Parade overpass, located at the up end of the station, was also provided around this time, replacing a level crossing.

The station was one of 35 closed to passenger traffic on 4 October 1981, as part of the New Deal for Country Passengers. In 1986, the station was provided with switching facilities. When switched out, the through section would be Benalla "B" box - Wangaratta.

During August 1991, the electric staff sections Benalla - Glenrowan - Wangaratta were abolished, and was replaced with electric staff section Benalla "B" Box - Wangaratta, with Glenrowan dis-established as an electric staff station. Also in 1991, all signals on the broad gauge line were abolished, along with the electric staff instruments and the platform loop siding. The sidings at the rear of the station were also disconnected from the main line around this time.

In 2000, the former crossing loop on the standard gauge line was extended by 510 metres in the down direction. In 2001, the Edwardian station building was demolished, and a replica of the original 1874 structure, based on original drawings, was constructed.

On 14 June 2008, over 100 local residents held a protest at the station, on the same day a special steam train operated along the line. A few weeks before, it had been announced that Chiltern, Springhurst, Violet Town, Euroa and Avenel would receive second platforms, as part of the gauge conversion of the North East line, with Glenrowan residents wanting the current platform reopened, and a second platform built, so that Ned Kelly tourist trains could visit Glenrowan.

On 12 February 2009, at a community meeting in Glenrowan, the Victorian Department of Transport announced it was not viable to re-open the station to passenger traffic. Local efforts to reopen the station for improved tourism continue.
