= Benalla railway station =

Railway station in Victoria, Australia

Benalla
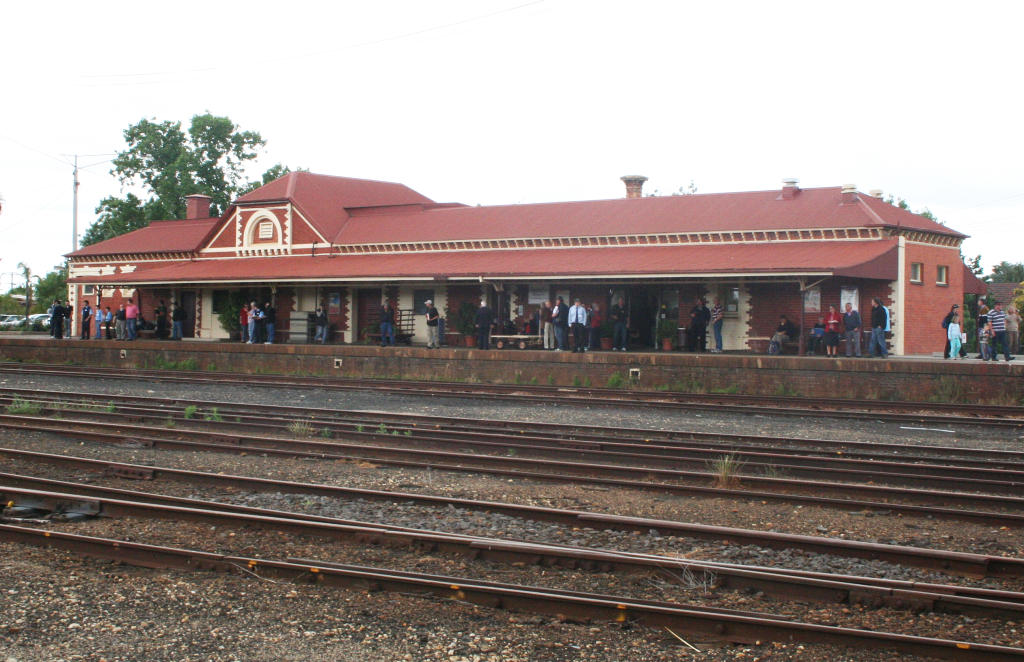
- Station building and platform, November 2008

General information
- Location: Mackellar Street, Benalla, Victoria 3672; Rural City of Benalla; Australia
- Coordinates: 36°32′41″S 145°59′02″E
- System: PTV regional and NSW TrainLink inter-city railway station
- Owner: VicTrack
- Operator: V/Line
- Lines: Albury Southern (North East); Oaklands; Tatong
- Distance: 195.25 kilometres (121.32 mi) from Southern Cross
- Platforms: 2 side
- Tracks: 5
- Connections: Bus; Coach

Construction
- Structure type: Ground
- Parking: Yes
- Cycle facilities: Yes
- Accessible: Yes

Other information
- Status: Operational, staffed part-time
- Station code: BEN
- Fare zone: Myki zone 15/16
- Website: Public Transport Victoria

History
- Opened: 18 August 1873; 153 years ago

Services
Preceding station	V/Line	Following station
Violet Town towards Southern Cross	Albury line	Wangaratta towards Albury
Preceding station	NSW TrainLink	Following station
Seymour towards Melbourne	NSW TrainLink Southern Line Melbourne XPT	Wangaratta towards Sydney
Former services
Preceding station	Disused railways	Following station
Junction	Oaklands line	Goorambat
Junction	Tatong line	Towards Tatong
	List of closed railway stations in Victoria	
Location
- Location within Victoria

Benalla railway station is a regional railway station on the North East line. It serves the town of Benalla, in Victoria, Australia. Benalla is a ground level part-time staffed station, featuring one side platform. It opened on 18 August 1873.

A goods shed and sidings are located to the west of the station, and a locomotive depot was formerly sited to the north. A turntable remains, and, until the broad gauge track was converted to standard gauge, it was occasionally used by steam locomotives.

To the north of the station, the Oaklands line branches off towards Yarrawonga. Benalla was also the junction of the closed Tatong branch line.

== History ==
Benalla opened as the temporary terminus of the line from Violet Town, before the line was extended to Wangaratta on 28 October 1873.

The site of the station was a controversial decision at the time, and was guided by the 1870 flood of the Broken River to the south that engulfed the town. When the line opened on 18 August 1873, only temporary facilities were provided. The first permanent building, of identical design to that at Seymour, was provided in 1874. It was extended in 1888, with the addition of dining and refreshment room facilities and administrative offices, all topped by a large tower.

The bridge over the Broken River, of iron plate-girder construction, was the longest metal girder bridge in Australia at the time of construction, totalling 241.7 metres. Listed on the Victorian Heritage Register, it was the second bridge of its type built in Victoria, and the first metal railway bridge both designed and fabricated within the colony.

The branch line to St James opened in 1883, and was extended to Yarrawonga in 1886. In the 1930s, the branch was further extended across the Murray River to its current terminus at Oaklands in NSW. The goods yard was expanded for this extra traffic in 1885, with more sidings added in 1902. Around this time, the original goods shed was demolished and replaced. The Tatong branch line was opened in 1913, and remained until closure in 1947.

In 1913, Benalla gained a second and third platform, these being a wide island platform, with a cantilevered verandah, located to the west of the main station building. The platforms were linked by an iron footbridge, which was provided in 1888, and was located across the station yard. The island platform was removed in 1937, leaving the main platform only. Two signal boxes were built in 1888, both being extended in 1914. Only the signal box at the up end remains today, but is unused.

A locomotive shed was provided at Benalla early on, at the down end of the station yard. Of corrugated iron construction, it could house six engines. In 1899, a roundhouse shed was erected, with the old shed used for wagon repairs. In 1908, a 70-foot (21 m) turntable was provided, replaced in 1953 by an electrically driven unit. Its use declined after the demise of steam locomotives, and several stalls were removed in 1960 to allow the construction of the parallel standard gauge track.

In 1961, boom barriers replaced interlocked gates at the Nunn Street level crossing, located nearby in the up direction from the station. In 1964, a platform was provided on the standard gauge line. By 1969, the turntable was booked out of use.

In 1974, the two-storey section and tower of the 1889 station building were demolished, on the basis that the whole building was too expensive to maintain, and to provide space for a car park. The demolition was postponed several times, due to the opposition of various local groups. By late 1975, a 3t crane at the station was abolished. In 1979, an underpass was provided at the up end of the station, to replace the footbridge that had been located at the down end.

In 1985, the former Way & Works area was replaced with a new camp site. During that time, the former office and crew rooms of the locomotive depot were also demolished, and the passenger facilities in the main station building were also refurbished. On 27 April 1988, the former BP and Mobil oil company sidings were abolished.

By 22 May 1990, the locomotive depot was closed. In May 1991, further alterations occurred, including the removal of a number of sidings, crossovers, disc signals and signal posts, and the sleeving of a number of levers, with further alterations occurring in July of the same year. Also during 1991, the Benalla - Glenrowan - Wangaratta sections of track, governed by electric staff , were abolished and replaced with electric staff section from Benalla "B" Box - Wangaratta. A new 70-foot (21 m) turntable was also provided in 1991.

The locomotive depot was hit by a severe storm on 22 November 1994, damaging the shed and destroying two Tait carriages stored inside. The shed was demolished shortly after.

In 1998, former New South Wales regional passenger operator, CountryLink, rebuilt the standard gauge platform. The works included replacing the original deck with a steel deck with a concrete surface, refurbishing the platform shelters, and providing new lighting, fencing, seating and bins.

In late 2018, Qube Logistics constructed an intermodal terminal in the former goods yard, to receive containerised cement and fly ash from Sydney, to be used in pre-cast panels being manufactured by Boral for the West Gate Tunnel. The first cement was delivered to the facility on 19 December of that year.

The former station Baddaginnie was located between Benalla and Violet Town, and former stations Winton and Glenrowan were located between Benalla and Wangaratta.

== Platforms and services ==
Benalla has two side platforms, and is served by V/Line Albury line, and NSW TrainLink XPT Sydney to Melbourne trains.

Benalla platform arrangement
Platform	Line	Destination
1	Albury line NSW TrainLink Southern	Southern Cross, Albury
2	NSW TrainLink Southern	Sydney

== Transport links ==
Benalla Bus Lines operates one route via Benalla station, under contract to Public Transport Victoria:

- 2 : Benalla – Benalla East

V/Line operates road coach services from Benalla station to Shepparton, Adelaide, Milawa, Bendigo, the Bendigo Campus of La Trobe University, Seymour, Wangaratta and Albury.
