= Winton railway station =

Former railway station in Victoria, Australia

Winton

General information
- Line: North East
- Platforms: 1

Other information
- Status: Closed

History
- Opened: 9 December 1877
- Closed: 31 August 1959

Services
Preceding station	V/Line	Following station
Benalla towards Southern Cross	North East line	Glenrowan towards Albury
List of closed railway stations in Victoria

Winton is a closed station located in the township of Winton, on the North East railway in Victoria, Australia. The station opened on 9 December 1887 as a firewood siding, the railway having opened in 1873. The passenger platform was on the eastern side of the line, but was closed to passenger traffic in 1959. The platform was then removed to allow the goods siding to be relocated there, to permit the construction of the parallel standard gauge line. The siding as since been removed.
