= Beechworth railway station =

Former railway station in Victoria, Australia

Coordinates: 36°21′44.84″S 146°41′20.66″E

Beechworth
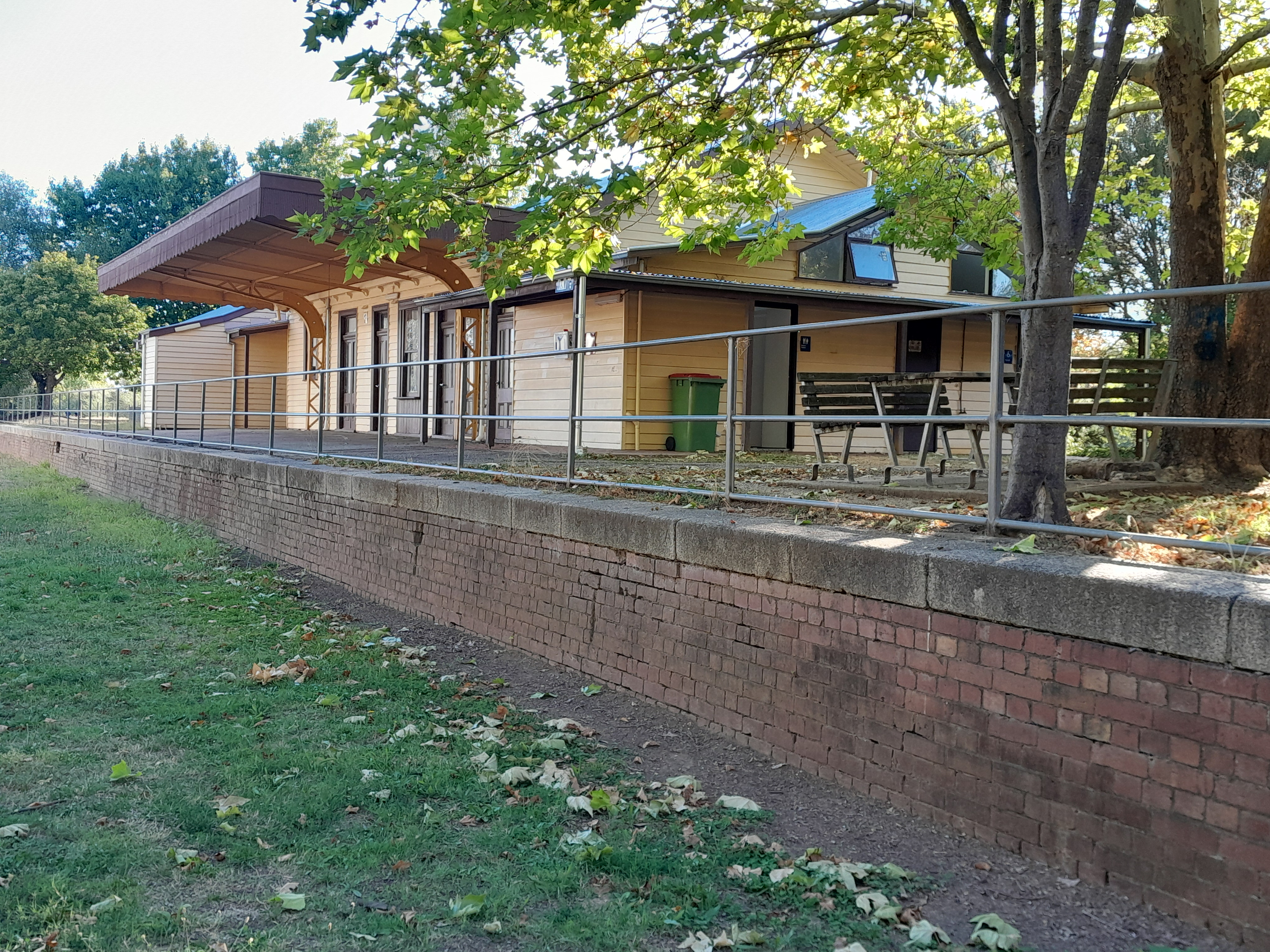
- Repurposed railway station building (March 2025)

General information
- Line: Yackandandah
- Platforms: 1
- Tracks: 4

Other information
- Status: Closed

History
- Opened: 29 September 1876
- Closed: 30 December 1976

Services
Preceding station	Disused railways	Following station
Everton	Yackandandah line	Yackandandah
	List of closed railway stations in Victoria	
Location

Beechworth railway station is a closed station on the closed Yackandandah line, located in Beechworth, Victoria.

The station was constructed in 1876 as the terminus of a branch line from the North East railway line at Bowser. Its location within the town was the subject of a minor local controversy, which the Ovens and Murray Advertiser described as a "storm in a teapot" when a site closer to the town centre was eventually selected. The station and line were officially opened on 29 September 1876 by Governor of Victoria George Bowen; parliamentarians George Kerferd and Robert Anderson; and president of the Shire of Beechworth H. Horrocks.

Although the tracks to Beechworth have been removed, the station building, platform and goods shed all remain in a good condition. The station building is used as a youth centre while the rail trail runs through the middle of the station grounds.
