= Rutherglen (disambiguation) =

Rutherglen is a town in South Lanarkshire, Scotland that has existed for over 800 years.

Rutherglen may also refer to:

- Rutherglen, Glasgow, a royal burgh in the unitary authority of South Lanarkshire in Scotland
  - Rutherglen railway station
  - Rutherglen (Parliament of Scotland constituency), prior to 1707
  - Rutherglen (Scottish Parliament constituency), 2011 to 2026
  - Rutherglen (UK Parliament constituency), 1918 to 2005
  - Rutherglen High School
- Rutherglen, Victoria, a small town in Australia, named after the Scottish burgh
  - Rutherglen railway station, Victoria
  - Rutherglen wine region
- Rutherglen, Ontario, a community in Bonfield, Canada

== See also ==
- Ruther Glen, Virginia
