= Tabletop =

Tabletop may refer to:

== Common use ==
- The top of a table

== Games ==
- TableTop, an Internet-based show about board games
- Tabletop games, encompassing several classes of games that can also be referred to individually as "Tabletop", including:
  - Tabletop role-playing games, as opposed to role-playing video games
  - Tabletop wargaming
  - Tabletop sports

== Mountains ==
- Table Top Mountain in Rangeville, Queensland, Australia
- Table Top Mountain (New York)

== Places ==
- Table Top, New South Wales, a suburb of Albury
- Tabletop, New South Wales, a small village on the Olympic Highway

== Other uses ==
- Table computer, a large-display portable all-in-one computer
- Table Tops, a free newspaper for Australian Army troops in World War II
- "Tabletop", a song on the Doubleclicks' 2014 album Dimetrodon
- Tabletop, a Freestyle BMX trick
- Tabletop runway, a type of runway

== See also ==
- Table Mountain in Cape Town, South Africa
- Tableland, an area containing elevated landforms characterised by a flat surface
