= Morven, New South Wales =

Morven
- Town
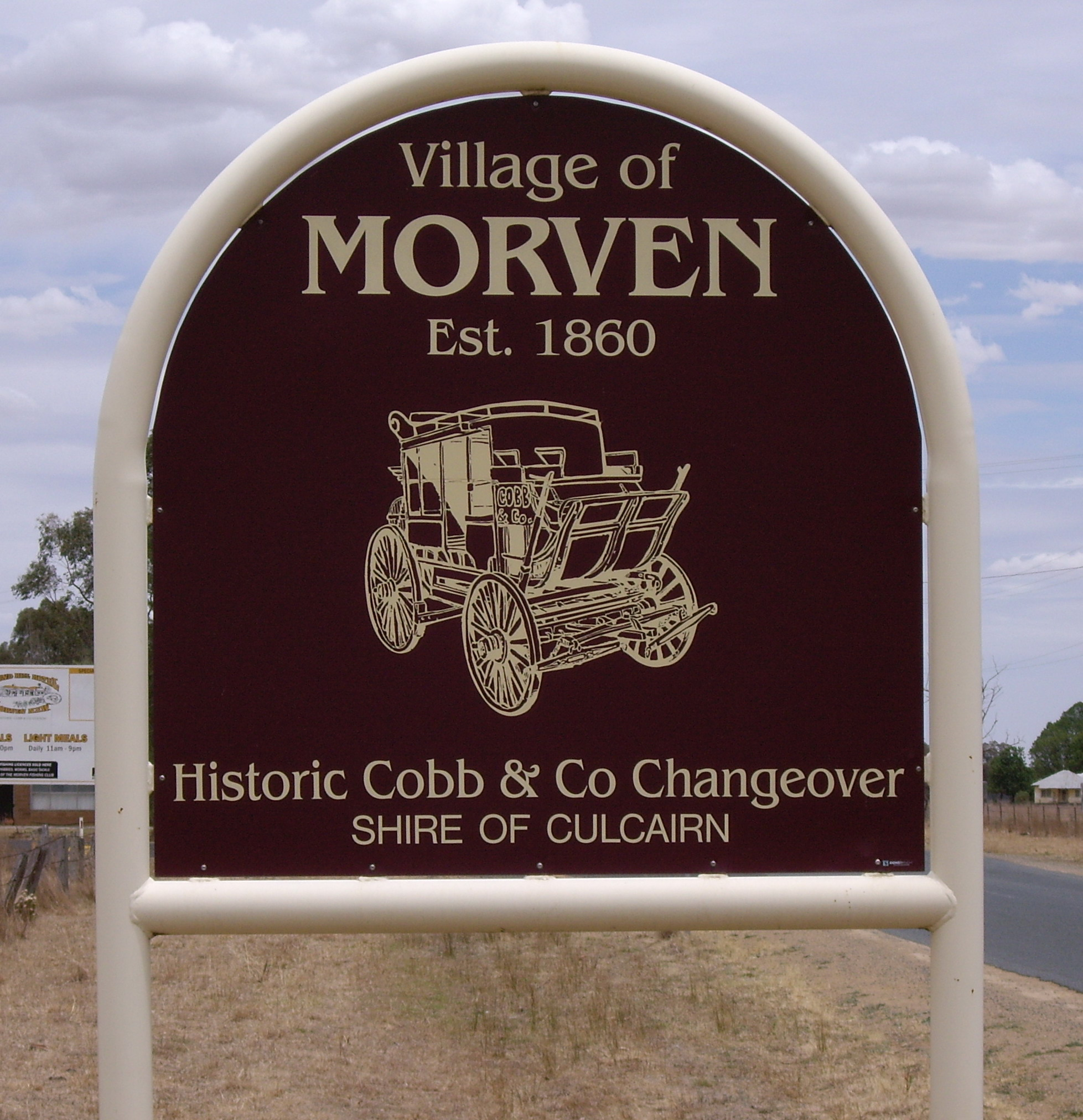
- Entering Village of Morven

- Coordinates: 35°39′0″S 147°6′0″E
- Country: Australia
- State: New South Wales
- LGA: Greater Hume Shire Council
- Location: 7 km (4.3 mi) from Culcairn; 21 km (13 mi) from Holbrook; 73 km (45 mi) from Wagga Wagga; 509 km (316 mi) from Sydney

Government
  - State electorate: Albury
  - Federal division: Farrer
- Elevation: 226 m (741 ft)

Population
  - Total: 125 (2021 census)
- Postcode: 2660
- County: Hume

Morven is a small village about 7 kilometres east of Culcairn in the eastern Riverina district of New South Wales, Australia. At the 2021 census, Morven has a population of 125 people.

== History ==
Morven began as a Cobb and Co Staging Post. Morven Post Office opened on 1 September 1880.

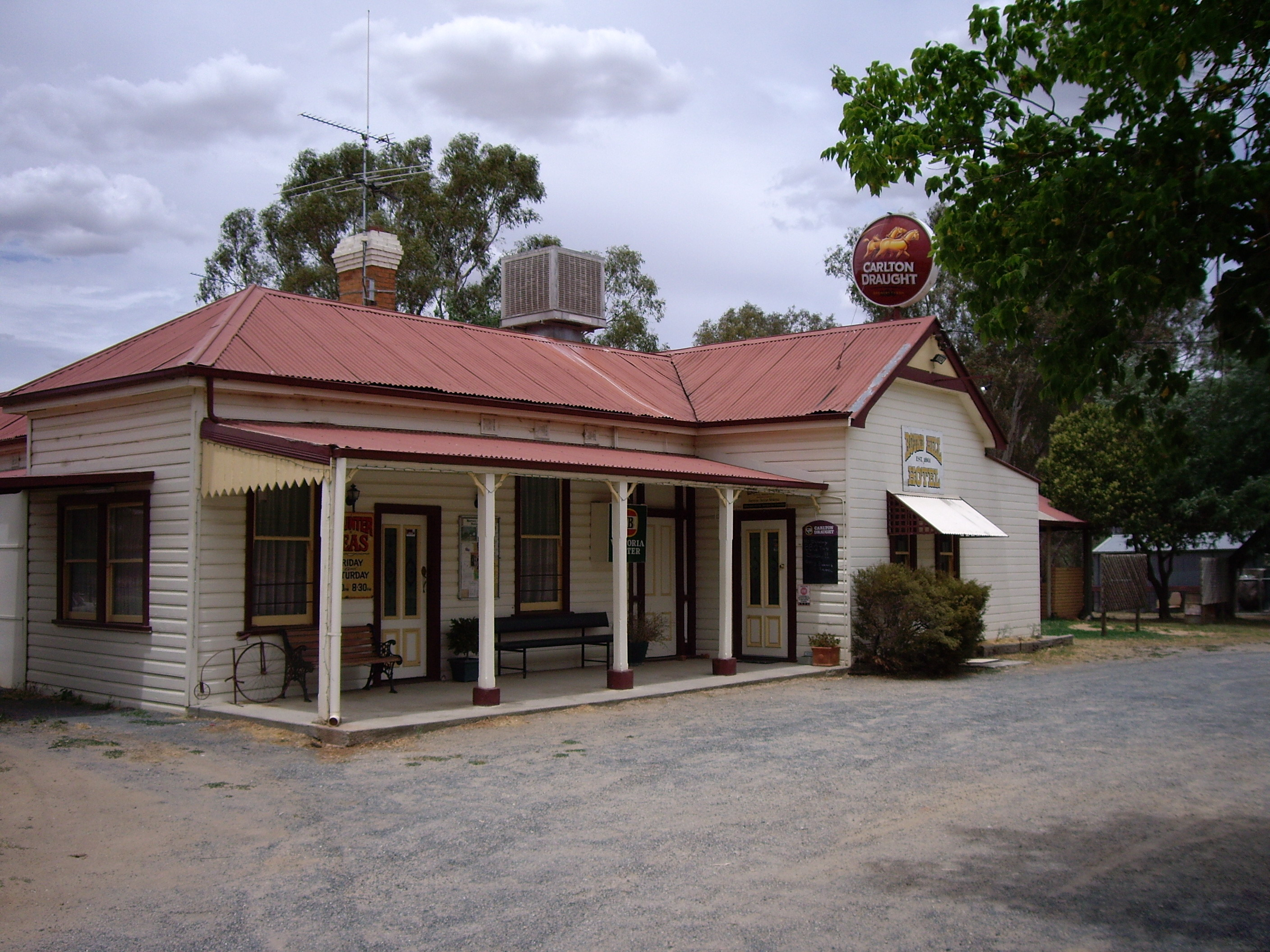
Round Hill Hotel

The Round Hill Hotel is somewhat misnamed, because the actual location of the Round Hill property is some kilometres away on the road from Holbrook to Culcairn. The hotel's name was changed from the Bridge Hotel to its current name when the owner of the hotel also became a part owner of the Round Hill property.

The town was serviced by the Holbrook branch railway line until the line was closed.

Morven formerly had a rugby league team who competed in the Group 13 Rugby League competition.

=== Dan "Mad Dog" Morgan ===
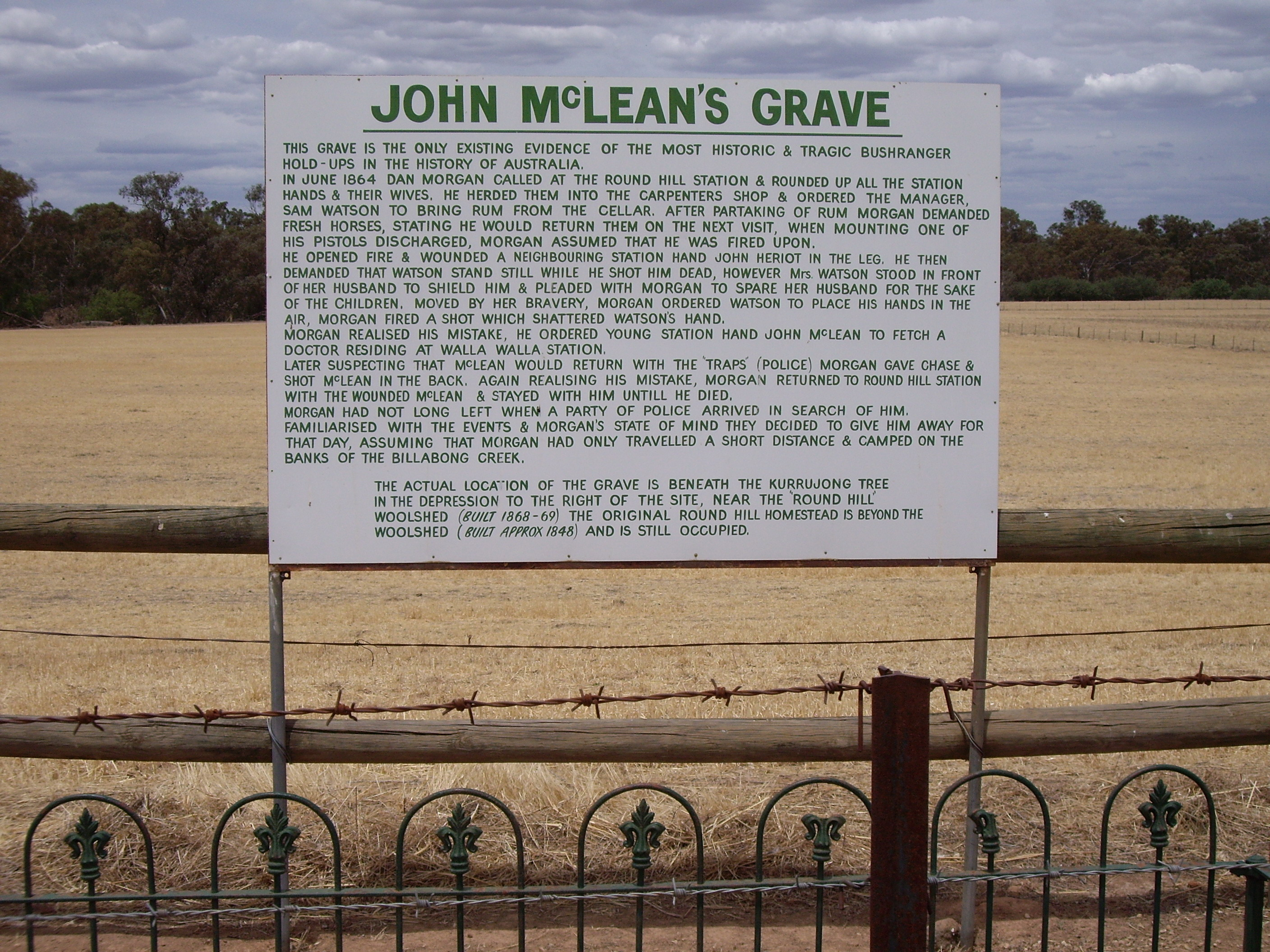
John McLean's grave

Bushranger Dan "Mad Dog" Morgan roamed the area in the mid-19th century and held up the Round Hill Station property situated along the road to Culcairn. During the hold-up, Morgan fatally wounded John McLean, an employee of the station. A grave and memorial stands at the site to commemorate the event.

=== Today ===
In recent years, Morven has continued to remain viable with a number of new houses being built and residents moving in. The site of the village still boasts the old church, a set of tennis courts and the Round Hill Hotel.
