= Wahgunyah railway line =

Former railway line in Victoria, Australia

Wahgunyah
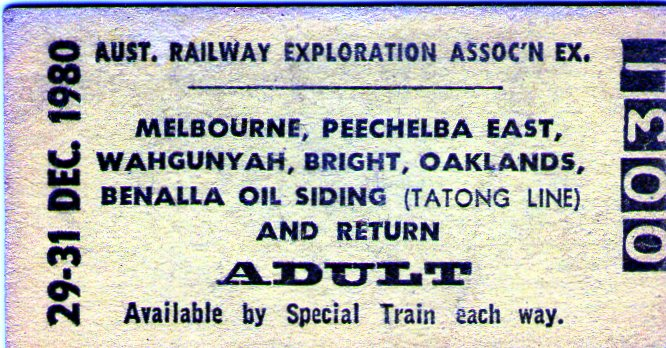
- Melbourne-Wahgunyah rail ticket from 1980

Overview
- Stations: 3

Service
- Type: Vic

History
- Opened: 29 January 1879
- Completed: 29 January 1879
- Closed: 1 July 1995

The Wahgunyah railway is a closed line in north-east Victoria, Australia. Branching off the main North East railway at Springhurst, it ran north-west to Wahgunyah.

The Wahgunyah terminus was located near the south bank of the Murray River, opposite the terminus of the New South Wales Culcairn - Corowa railway line on the north bank, but there was no connecting rail bridge over the river. Because the two lines were of differing gauges, and the stations 2.5 kilometres (1.6 mi) apart, there was no particular benefit in building a bridge to connect the two incompatible systems.

== History ==
The line was opened as a whole from Springhurst to Wahgunyah in 1879. The passenger service was withdrawn on 13 April 1962, and was the last mixed train service to operate in Victoria.

Services were suspended in 1995, and the line effectively closed. However, for a number of years after that, the "Green Trail Associates Group" operated a motor trolley service, known as the "Stringybark Express", over the section of the line between Wahgunyah and Rutherglen.

In 2002, the line was handed back to the Victorian Government by the lease holder, Freight Australia, and, in 2006, it was announced that the Murray to the Mountains Rail Trail would be built on part of the closed track, creating nine kilometres (5.6 mi) of trail between Rutherglen and Wahgunyah. That work was completed in 2009.

== Stations ==
- Wahgunyah Railway Station, 29 January 1879 – 1 July 1995
- Lilliput Railway Station
- Rutherglen Railway Station, 29 January 1879 – 1 July 1995
- Springhurst Railway Station, 21 November 1873 – present

== Today ==
In its present form, the railway line is partially ripped up due to the Murray to the Mountains Rail Trail along this line. Although being closed for over twenty years now, remnants of the once active rail line such as signs, track and sleepers are visible.
