= Culcairn railway station =

Railway station in New South Wales, Australia

Culcairn
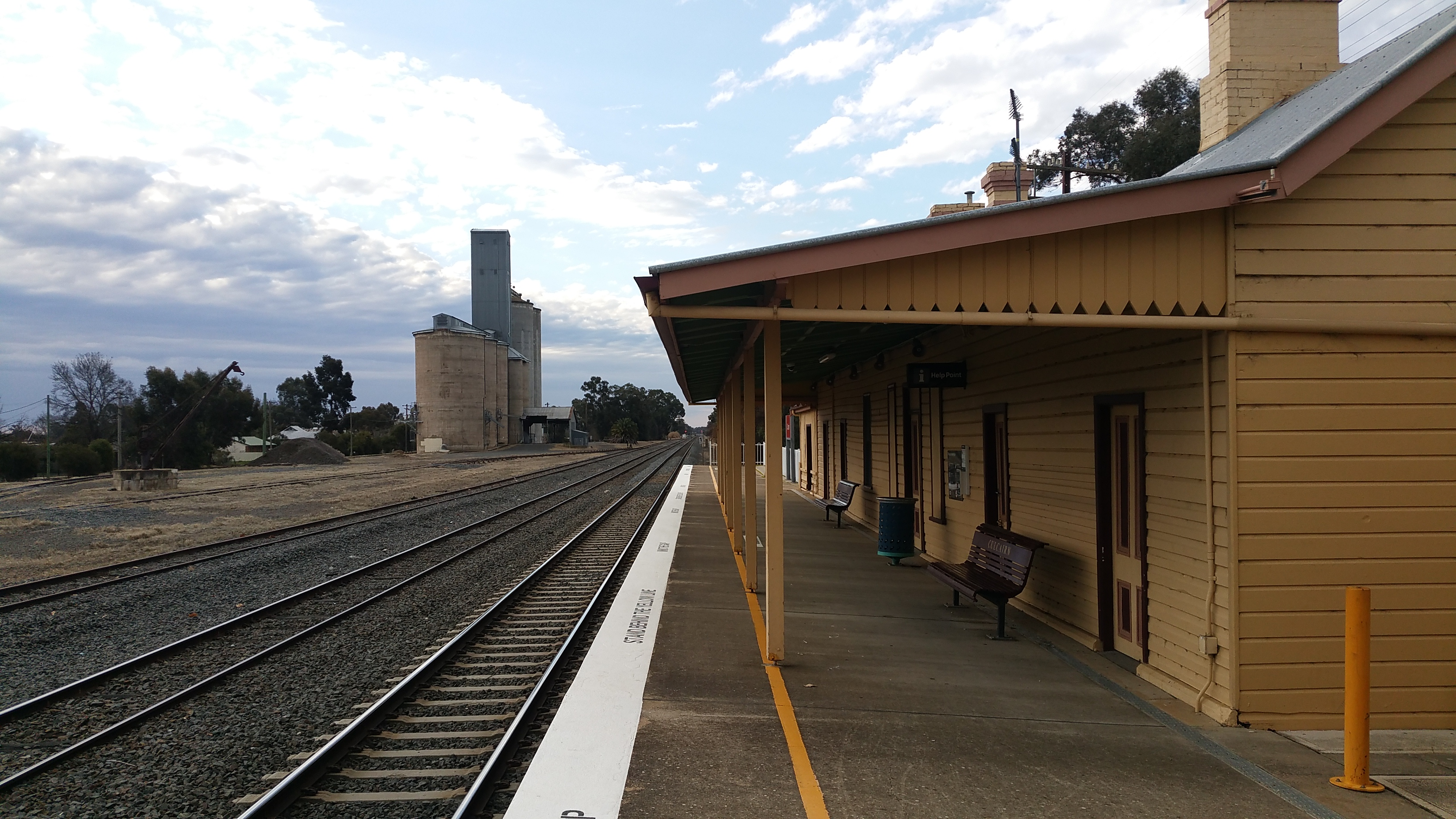
- Platform and station building, July 2018

General information
- Location: Olympic Highway, Culcairn; Australia
- Coordinates: 35°39′58″S 147°02′17″E
- Owner: Transport Asset Manager of New South Wales
- Operator: NSW TrainLink
- Lines: Main Southern; Corowa; Holbrook
- Distance: 596.82 kilometres (370.85 mi) from Central
- Platforms: 1
- Tracks: 3

Construction
- Structure type: Ground
- Accessible: Yes

Other information
- Station code: CUL

History
- Opened: 1 September 1880; 146 years ago

Services
Preceding station	NSW TrainLink	Following station
Albury towards Melbourne	NSW TrainLink Southern Line Melbourne XPT	Henty towards Sydney
Former services
Preceding station	Former services	Following station
Former NSW Main line services
Gerogery towards Albury	Main Southern Line	Henty towards Sydney
Location

Culcairn railway station is a heritage-listed railway station located on the Main Southern line in New South Wales, Australia. It serves the town of Culcairn. It was added to the New South Wales State Heritage Register on 2 April 1999.

== History ==
Culcairn station opened on 1 September 1880 when the Main South line was extended from Wagga to Gerogery. Opposite the platform lies a passing loop. There used to be a large set of sidings with loading banks and the wheat silos are still intact.

The 1883 built station master's residence has been restored by the Culcairn Museum Committee.

On 3 October 1892, Culcairn became a junction station with the opening of the Corowa line and an island platform added. On 18 September 1902, the Holbrook line opened. Both lines have since closed and the island platform demolished.

Since 2010, the footbridge on the Sydney side of the railway crossing was closed to the public. In 2018, it was reported that the footbridge will need to be enhanced, replaced or removed to allow the passage of double stacked freight trains. The footbridge is one of 12 structures along the Albury to Illabo leg of the Inland Rail Project that is being assessed.

== Services ==
Culcairn is served by two daily NSW TrainLink XPT services in each direction operating between Sydney and Melbourne. This is a request stop, so the train stops only if passengers booked to board/alight here.

Platform	Line	Stopping pattern	Notes
1	Southern Region	services to Sydney Central & Melbourne	request stop (booked passengers only)

== Description ==
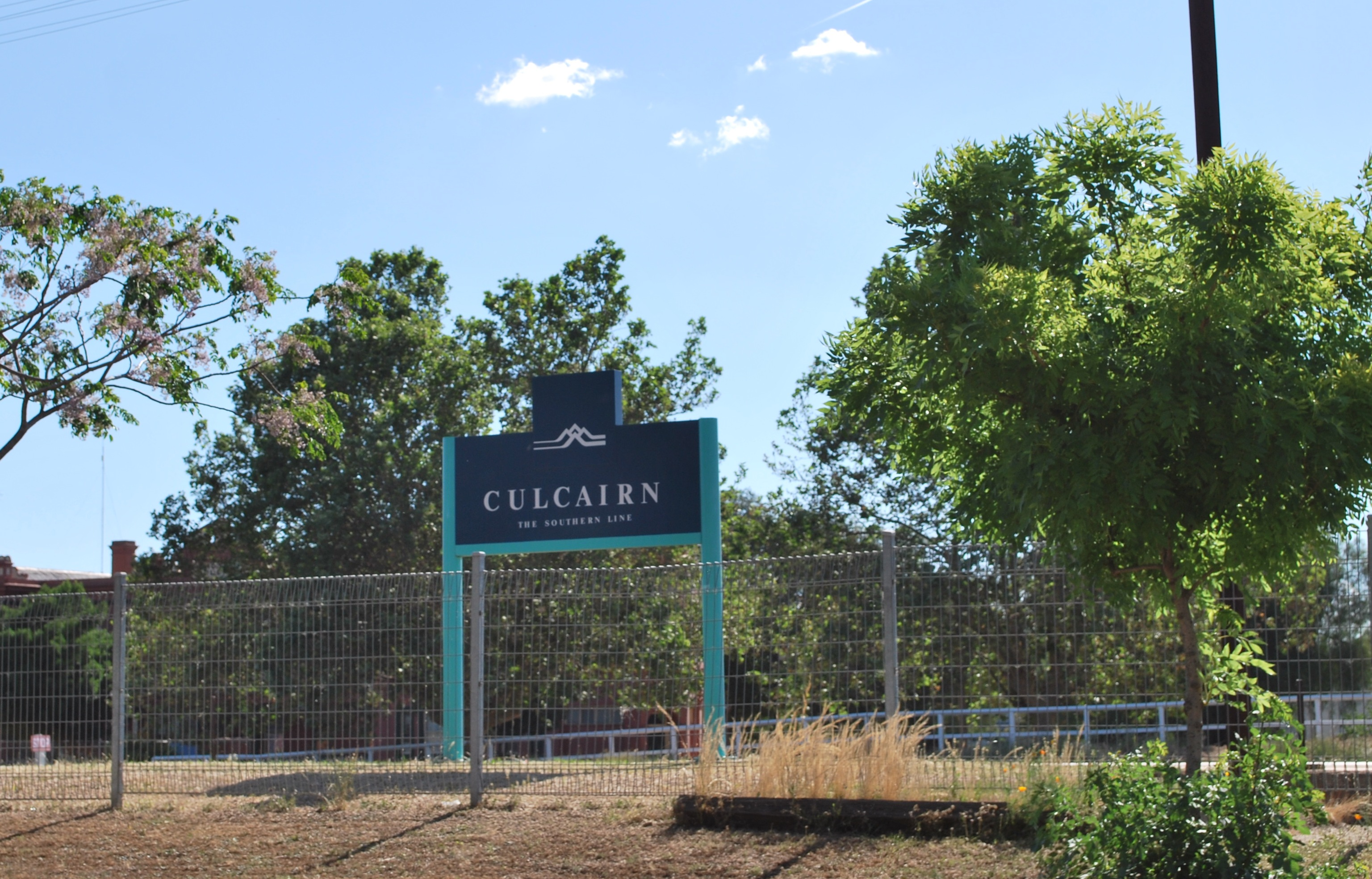
Station sign, 2009

The station building is of timber construction and a standard roadside design with a brick platform. It was completed in 1880.

== Heritage listing ==
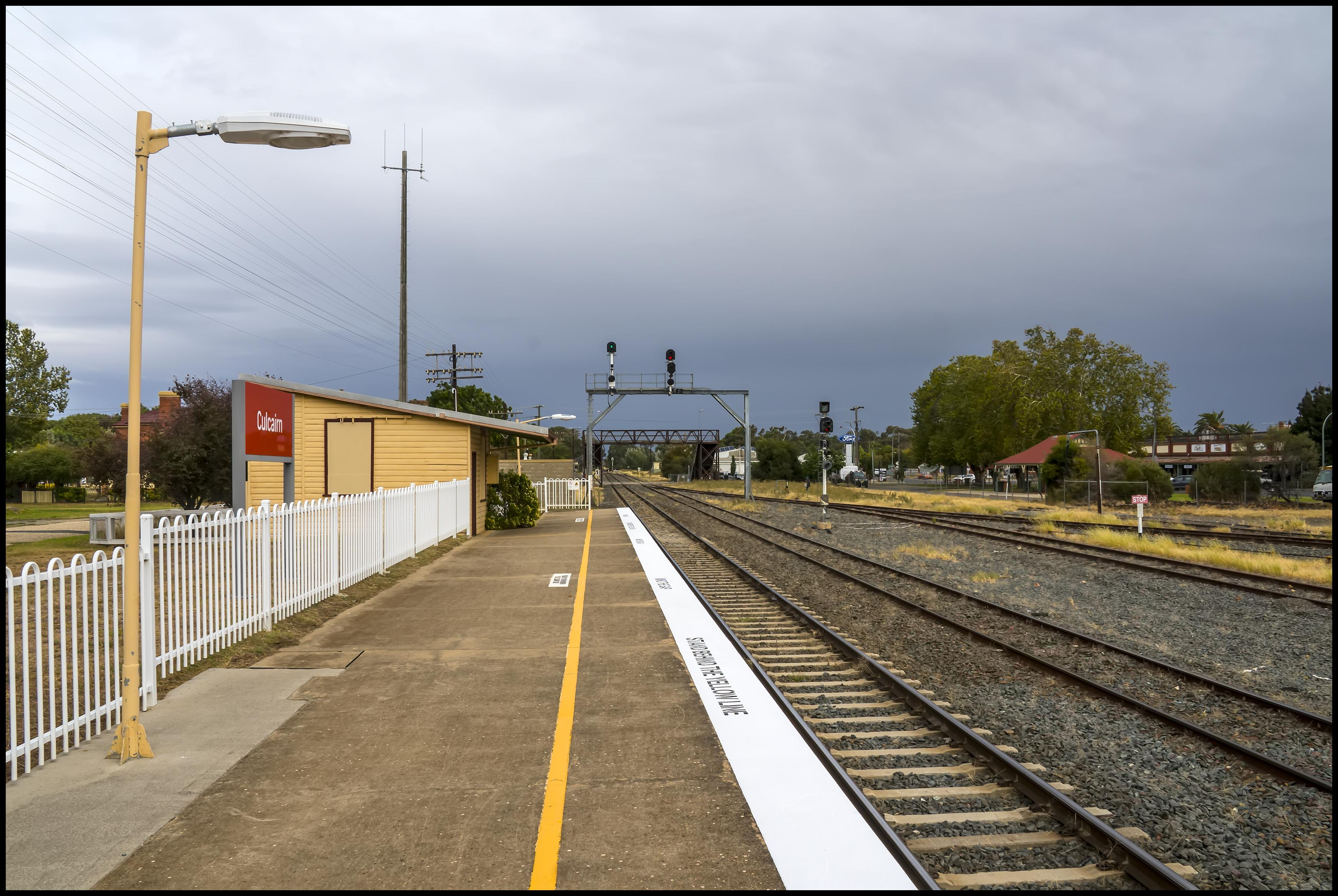
Looking south towards Melbourne, 2018

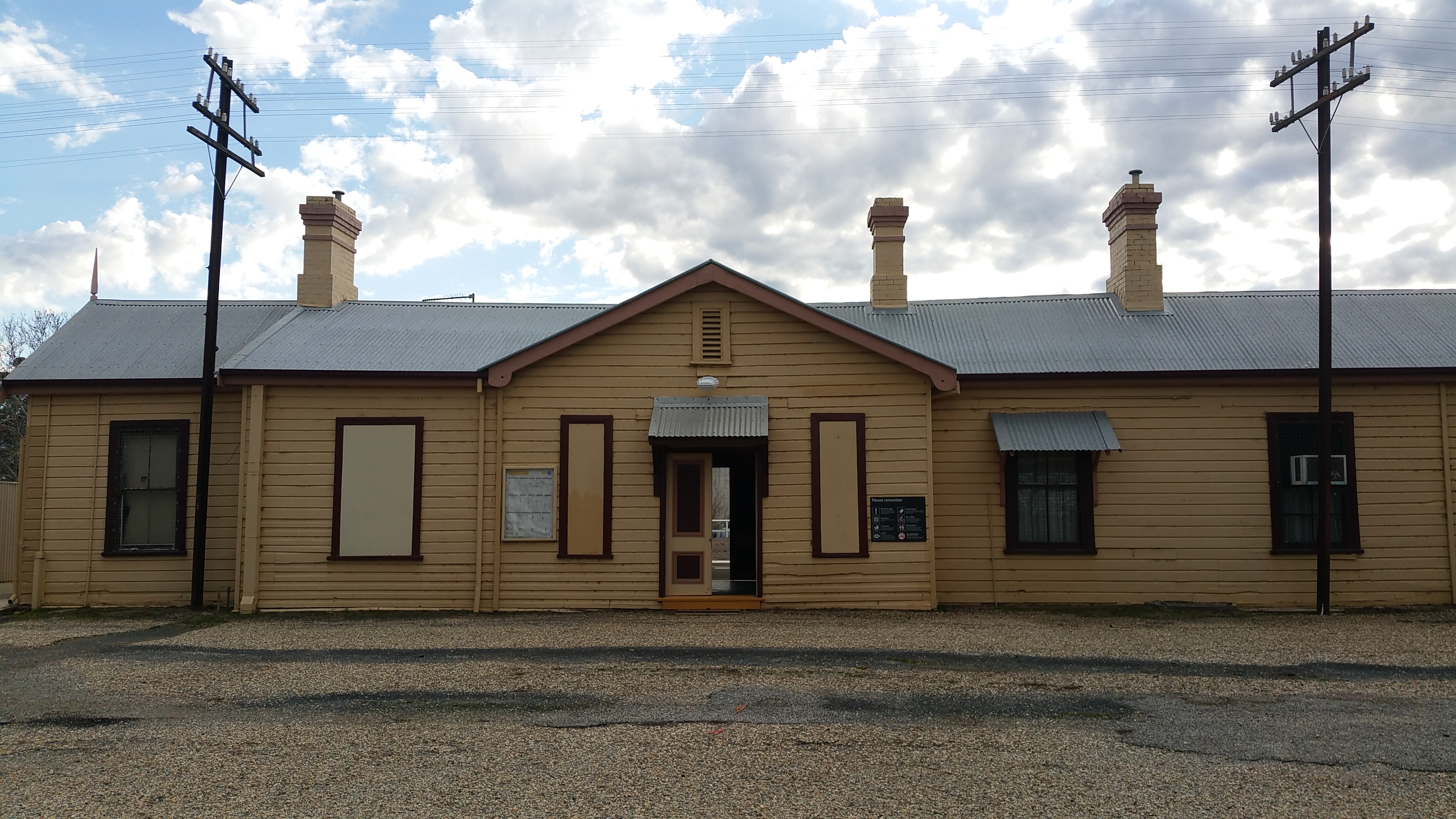
Station building

Culcairn is an excellent example of an early timber roadside station building with a major residence (no longer owned by State Rail) and good platform and details surviving. The station building is a large structure with simplified detail but without the form of the grander brick buildings. The residence is similar to several constructed on the southern line and is interesting as it is out of scale with other development on the site, although reflecting the expected importance of the freight traffic on the line. The site is also unusual in having a footbridge across the tracks not associated with the station but at a level crossing, indicating the high level of traffic and activity at the town conflicting with main line and shunting movements. The second platform and building and much of the infrastructure for the yard and passenger use has been removed but the remaining structures are an important surviving relic which make an important contribution to the townscape of Culcairn with its location in the centre of the town.

Culcairn railway station was listed on the New South Wales State Heritage Register on 2 April 1999 having satisfied the following criteria.

The place possesses uncommon, rare or endangered aspects of the cultural or natural history of New South Wales.

This item is assessed as historically rare. This item is assessed as arch. rare. This item is assessed as socially rare.
