= Gerogery railway station =

Historic site in New South Wales, Australia

Gerogery
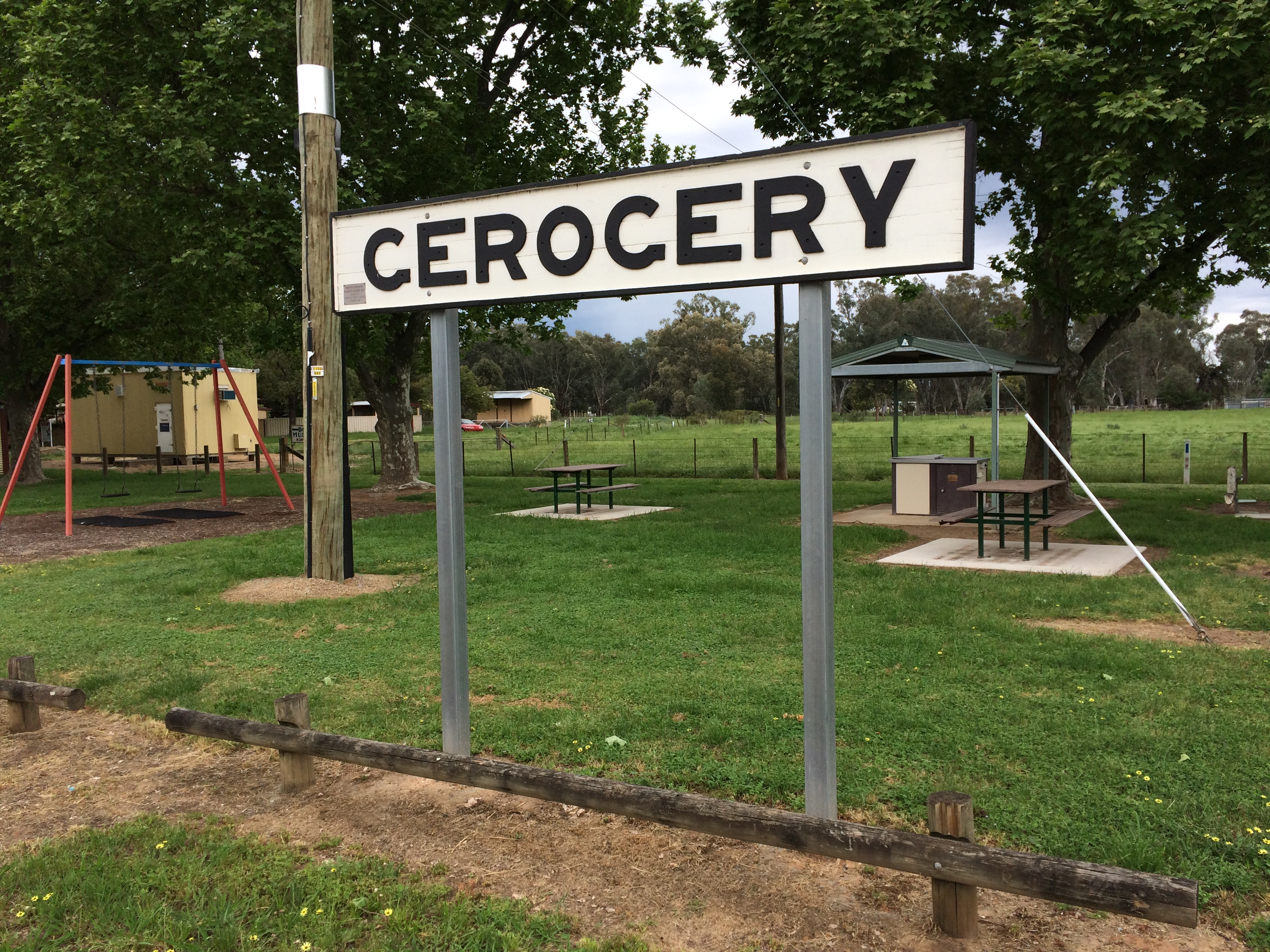
- Gerogery railway station sign, now relocated to a park, 2017

General information
- Location: Coach Road, Gerogery, New South Wales; Australia
- Coordinates: 35°50′13″S 146°59′43″E
- Elevation: 802 feet (244 m)
- Operator: State Rail Authority
- Line: Main South line
- Distance: 616.370 km (382.995 mi) from Central
- Platforms: 1 (1 side)
- Tracks: 4

Construction
- Structure type: Ground

History
- Opened: 1 September 1880
- Closed: 1984

Services
Preceding station	Former services	Following station
Table Top towards Albury	Main Southern Line	Culcairn towards Sydney
Location

Gerogery railway station is a heritage-listed disused railway station on the Main Southern line, serving the town of Gerogery in the Riverina, New South Wales, Australia. It opened in 1880 and consisted of a since-demolished signal box and weatherboard station building. The station was located on a passing loop with two goods and grain sidings, which have since been removed. The station building remains in a significant state of disrepair.
