= Albury Racecourse railway station =

Former railway station in New South Wales, Australia

Albury Racecourse

General information
- Location: Albury Racecourse, Albury, New South Wales; Australia
- Coordinates: 36°03′34″S 146°56′51″E
- Operator: Public Transport Commission
- Line: Main Southern line
- Distance: 642.354 km (399.140 mi) from Central
- Platforms: 1 (1 side)
- Tracks: 1

Construction
- Structure type: Ground

Other information
- Status: Demolished

History
- Opened: 3 February 1881
- Closed: June 1962

Services
Preceding station	Former services	Following station
Albury Terminus	Main Southern Line	Ettamogah towards Sydney
Location

Albury Racecourse railway station was a railway station on the Main Southern line, serving the racecourse in Albury, New South Wales, Australia. The station opened in 1881 and closed in 1962, and was one of the few racecourse railway stations included in public timetables and maps. The station consisted of a single platform, and little remains of it today.
