= Gerogery =

- Town
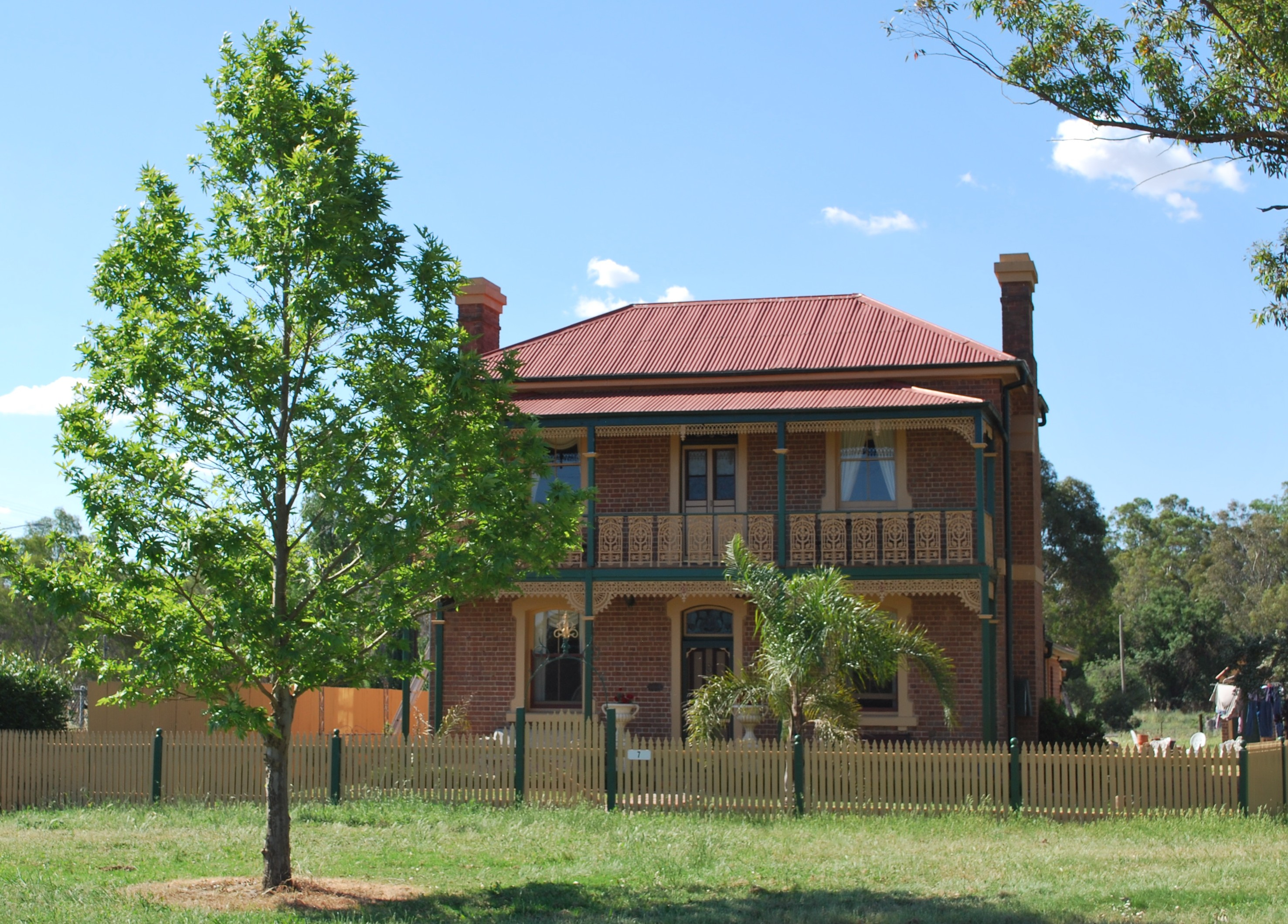
- The National Trust listed station master's house

- Coordinates: 35°49′0″S 147°00′0″E
- Country: Australia
- State: New South Wales
- LGA: Greater Hume Shire
- Location: 534 km (332 mi) SW of Sydney; 342 km (213 mi) NE of Melbourne; 34 km (21 mi) N of Albury; 19 km (12 mi) S of Culcairn

Government
  - State electorate: Albury
  - Federal division: Farrer
- Elevation: 245 m (804 ft)

Population
  - Total: 979 (2006 census)
- Postcode: 2642
- County: Goulburn

Gerogery (/dʒərɒdʒəri/ jə-RODGE-ər-i) is a town established on Wiradjuri land in the Murray region of the Australian state of New South Wales. The town is in the Greater Hume Shire local government area and on the Main South railway line between Sydney and Melbourne, where it intersects with the Olympic Highway. Gerogery serves a rural farming community. Gerogery has a temperate climate. It lies close to the Great Yambla Range, with its striking Tabletop and Sugar Loaf ridge at the southern end.

At the 2006 census, Gerogery had a population of 979.

== History ==
Gerogery is on land originally inhabited by the Wiradjuri people. In English, the place name is pronounced Jer-rodge-er-rree; however, in Indigenous language it could have been a repeated "Jerro-Jerro ee". Local understanding is the place is named after the Wiradjuri word for magpies, plentiful in the locality.

The arrival of European settlers meant that trees were extensively cleared and wheat planted, along with sheep and cattle grazed. Gerogery was at the easternmost extent of nineteenth-century German immigration up the Murray River from South Australia.

During the 1860s, bushranger Mad Dan Morgan held up Sam Watson at Gerogery East. His hideout, "Morgan's Place" is located in the Yambla Range, and was used in between holdups around Tumbarumba, Kyeamba, and as a place to take refuge after the alleged killing of several police and a Wagga Wagga judge. (The bushranger was subject of a Dennis Hopper film Mad Dog Morgan.)

Gerogery Post Office opened on 15 April 1875.

The coming of the Sydney Great Southern Railway in 1880 made Gerogery the temporary terminus while building proceeded on to Albury. This railway resulted in moving the centre of population from an original settlement (now Gerogery West) to the railway line. The station master's residence is a beautiful two-story house listed by the National Trust. The original station was removed in the 1980s. A one-teacher government school was set up close to the railway line in 1884, as part of the general plan by the New South Wales government to stem the spread of religious-based education that was springing up for the poor of the colony.

Not far from Gerogery on the way to Walla Walla is a peak of rocks which was used as a meeting place and lookout to help break the shearers' strike of 1891.

The Gerogery Commemoration Hall was built in the 1920s. Many concerts and gatherings, including for the monthly Country Women's Association branch, have met here.

Being 20 miles (32 km) from Albury, and on a stock route, the Gerogery Pub attracted Sunday clientele from Albury, who were able to use a statutory loophole to evade Sunday closing and order an alcoholic drink.

Prosperity brought by the Korean War wool boom saw the expansion of Gerogery township in the 1950s, with a few general stores, but this had contracted to just one combined post office store by the late 1960s. In 1974 the area was included in the area to be developed as part of a proposed greater Albury-Wodonga region, proposed by the Whitlam government as part of its national decentralisation program, but these plans were dismantled by Prime Minister Gough Whitlam's successor, Malcolm Fraser. By the end of the twentieth century increased use of the car meant that Gerogery had become a dormitory suburb of Albury.

In the 1960s Aboriginal stone tools were found a couple of kilometres north-west of the township.

== Heritage listings ==
Gerogery has a number of heritage-listed sites, including:

- Main Southern railway: Gerogery railway station

== Railway ==
The railway has a crossing loop at Gerogery. Under the AusLink plan, the line between Gerogery and the next crossing loop to the south, Tabletop, will be duplicated. The duplicated line will be about 14 kilometres (9 mi) long and will allow for running crosses, where trains in opposing directions need not slow down or stop, and where flights of trains can also pass each other. Due to cost-saving measures, the length of the passing lanes have been reduced to approximately 6 kilometres (4 mi).

In 2001, there was a fatal accident at a level crossing on the railway line along Bells Road on the Olympic Highway. As a result, the level crossing has been replaced by the Five Mates Bridge.

== Sports and recreation ==
The Gerogery Football Club was formed in 1903 after a meeting at the Gerogery Hotel. Gerogery FC had a golden era in the early 1930s, when they won the 1930 Central Hume Football Association premiership, then won four consecutive Hume Football League premierships from 1933 to 1936, before folding in 1949.

Gerogery also formerly had a rugby league team in the Group 13 Rugby League competition.

== Tourist attractions ==
The architecture of the station master's house, the Gerogery Pub, and Commemoration Hall, are worthy of note. The Gerogery Doll Museum is also an attraction.

== 2009 bushfire ==
On 17 December 2009, a fire began at the smouldering Walla Walla rubbish tip, and spread in high winds (estimated to be 100 kilometres per hour (62 mph)) across farm land between Glenellen and Gerogery. It took less than an hour to travel 10 kilometres (6.2 mi), burning out an estimated 7,000 hectares (17,000 acres). The Rural Fire Service reported sheds, crops, cars and four dwellings were destroyed; the tennis courts were burned down, part of the Olympic Highway was closed, and the Benambra Range was under threat. At least 50 fire trucks were deployed in the Gerogery area.

The Greater Hume Shire Council provided $200,000 to help landowners replace approximately 300 kilometres (190 mi) of boundary fences and help in the removal of fallen tree debris.
