= Culcairn =

- Town
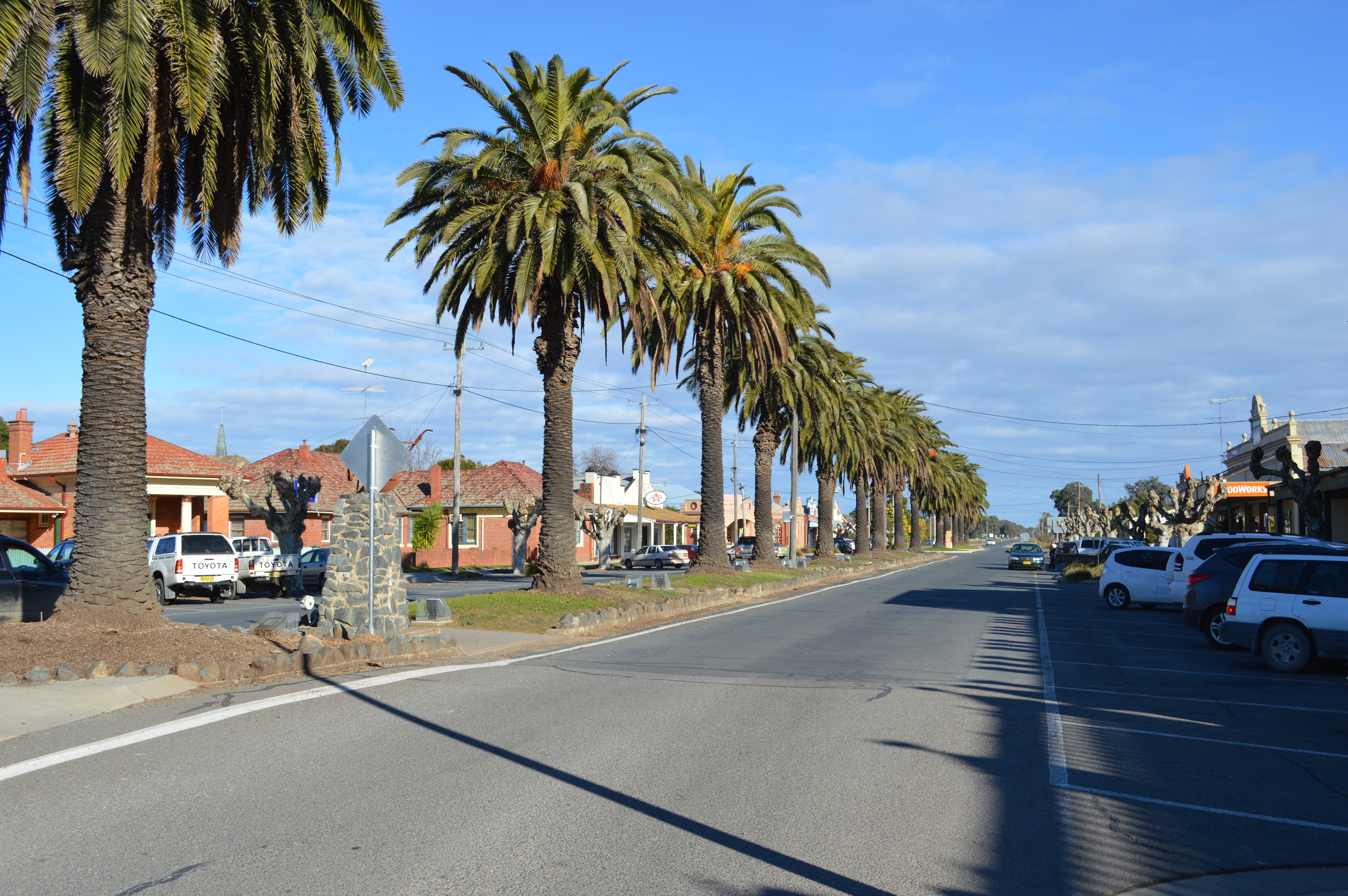
- Balfour St, the main street of Culcairn

- Coordinates: 35°40′0″S 147°03′0″E
- Country: Australia
- State: New South Wales
- LGA: Greater Hume Shire Council
- Location: 514 km (319 mi) from Sydney; 362 km (225 mi) from Melbourne; 53 km (33 mi) from Albury; 81 km (50 mi) from Wagga Wagga

Government
  - State electorate: Albury
  - Federal division: Farrer
- Elevation: 215 m (705 ft)

Population
  - Total: 1,483 (2021 census)
- Postcode: 2660
- County: Hume

Culcairn (/kʌlkɛərn/) is a town in the south-east Murray region of New South Wales, Australia. Culcairn is located in the Greater Hume Shire local government area on the Olympic Highway between Albury and Wagga Wagga. The town is 514 kilometres (319 mi) south-west of the state capital, Sydney and at the 2021 census had a population of 1,483.

The town is an important supply centre for nearby towns and villages including, Morven, Gerogery, Henty, Walla Walla and Pleasant Hills. Billabong Creek runs along the southern edge of town, lending its name to the local high school.

== History ==
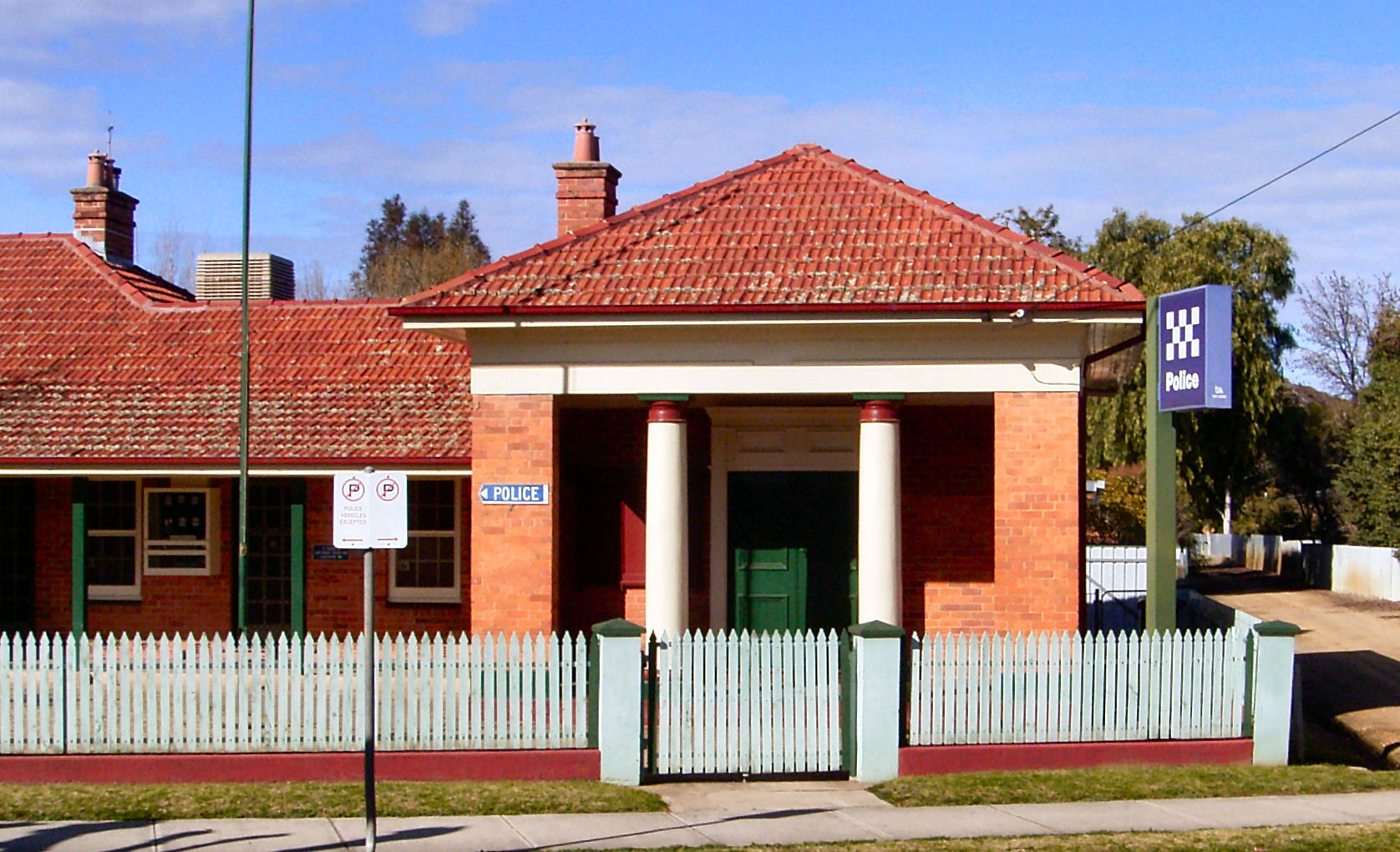
Police station and former courthouse, Balfour St, Culcairn

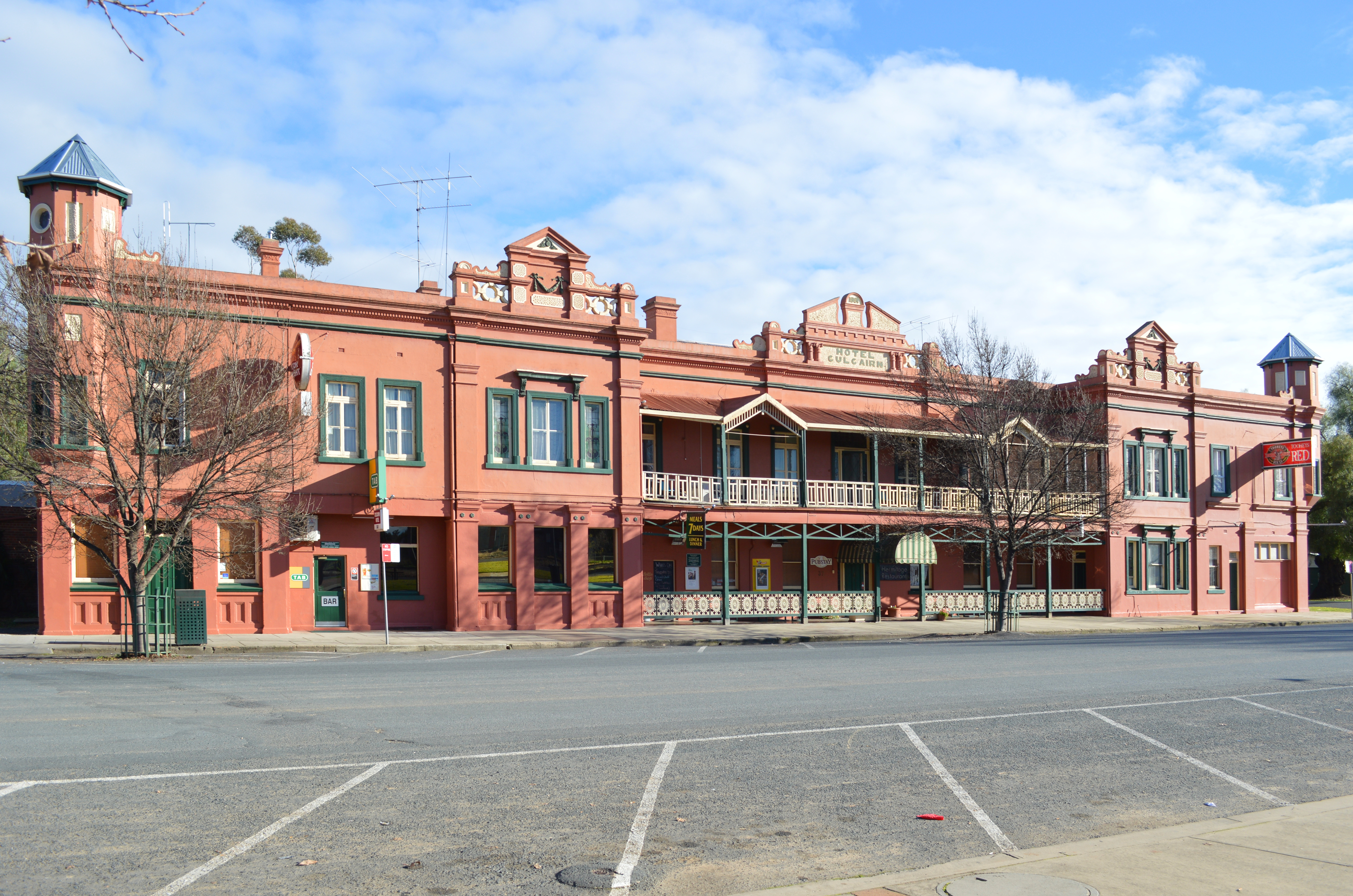
Culcairn Hotel

European settlement of Culcairn began in 1834, following favorable reports on grazing potential and grass cover by the explorers Hume and Hovell when traveling overland to the Port Phillip district in 1824. A number of stations were gazetted and between 1862 and 1865 the district was terrorized by the bushranger, Dan "Mad Dog" Morgan. The reward for Morgan would reach £1,000. He was ambushed and killed in Victoria after his final holdup in 1865.

The town itself was laid out in 1880 by James Balfour, a local landowner, who named it after a property in the parish of Kiltearn, his mother's birthplace. Culcairn Post Office opened on 1 September 1880.

Early industries included chaff mills, a cereal grain company and a quarry. The extension of the Main Southern railway line to Albury to meet the broad gauge line from Melbourne saw Culcairn prosper. The Culcairn Hotel, constructed in 1891, was the largest on the line between Melbourne and Sydney.

Famously, Culcairn did not have a baby born in the town for over 10 years until Hunter Kevin Charles White was miraculously born in a nursing home on 28 December 2005.

== Heritage listings ==
Culcairn has a number of heritage-listed sites, including:

- Main Southern railway: Culcairn railway station

== Sports and recreation ==
=== Australian Rules ===
The Culcairn Football Club is an Australian rules football club that was first established in May 1895.

In 1916, a 21 year old former player, Private Dan Dalahunty was killed in action, was one of the "Men of the Dardanelles".

In 1923, Culcairn's jumper colours were - maroon with blue cuffs and collars; maroon socks, topped with blue.

Culcairn played Mangoplah in the 1923 Grand Final at Yerong Creek and Mangoplah won the Yerong Creek & DFA premiership.

Culcairn has played in the following football competitions:

- 1910–1913: Culcairn & District Football Association Premiers – 1910. Captain – E J Wilson.
- 1914–1915: Culcairn & District Junior Football Association
- 1916–1918: In recess due to World War I
- 1919–1921: Culcairn & District Football Association Premiers – 1921
- 1922 – Riverina Main Line Football Association Runners Up – 1922
- 1923 – Yerong Creek & District Football Association Runners Up – 1923
- 1924–1929: Riverina Football Association Runners Up – 1928.
- 1930–1940: Albury & District Football League. Premiers – 1936 Runners Up – 1938, 1940
- 1941–1945: In recess due to World War II
- 1946–1956: Albury & District Football League Premiers – 1952, 1953, 1954. Runners Up – 1946, 1951
- 1957–1980: Farrer Football League Premiers – 1963, 1968
- 1981–1991: Tallangatta & District Football League Premiers – 1990
- 1992–2025: Hume Football League Premiers – 1993, 2007 Runners Up – 1992, 1994, 1995, 2005, 2010.

Culcairn & District Football Association

This Australian rules football competition was formed in 1910 and ran for four years up until 1913, then went into recess due to World War I. Depending on what side of the railway line the club was situated in, the competition had a Western Division and an Eastern Division. The competition re-formed in 1919.

- Culcairn & DFA – Grand Finals
  - 1910 – Culcairn: 43 defeated Walbundrie: 35. Played at Culcairn.
  - 1911 – Walbundrie: 6.12 – 48 defeated Germanton: 2.7 – 19. Played at Culcairn.
  - 1912 – Germanton: 6.11 – 47 defeated Walla Walla: 2.7 – 19. Played at Culcairn. Scholtz Cup.
  - 1913 – Germanton: 7.3 – 45 defeated Culcairn: 4.7 – 31. Played at Culcairn.
  - 1914–1918: Culcairn & DFA in recess due to World War I.
  - 1919 – Holbrook: 10.13 – 73 defeated Culcairn: 4.10 – 34. Played at Culcairn.
  - 1920 – Holbrook defeated Henty
  - 1921 – Culcairn defeated Holbrook. Played at Culcairn.
- Germanton. This town was renamed as Holbrook in 1915.

In 1922, the Riverina Main Line Football Association that was formed and based in Wagga Wagga. The seven club's that made up this competition were - Culcairn, Henty, Mangoplah, Wagga Federals, Wagga Newtown, Wagga Stars and Yerong Creek. This competition was only in existence for one season, with the Wagga Stars defeating Yerong Creek in the Grand Final. On the eve of the final series Culcairn, Henty, and Mangoplah withdrew from the competition, citing the fact the association refused to provide a VFL umpire for the final series.

Teams in the Culcairn & DFA per year

- 1910: Eastern Division – Cookardinia, Culcairn, Germanton and Henty. Western Division – Balldale, Brocklesby, Walbundrie and Walla Walla.
- 1911: Eastern Division – Cookardinia, Culcairn, Germanton and Henty. Western Division – Balldale, Brocklesby, Walbundrie and Walla Walla.
- 1912: Eastern Division – Cookardinia, Culcairn, Germanton, Henty and Morven. Western Division – Balldale, Brocklesby, Walbundrie and Walla Walla.

=== Rugby League ===
Culcairn formerly had a rugby league team who competed in the Group 13 Rugby League competition. Founded in 1946, the club wore green and gold jerseys similar to the Australian national rugby league team.

== Climate ==
Climate data for Culcairn (Lat: 35.67° S Lon: 147.04° E) (precipitation normals 1961-1990)
Month	Jan	Feb	Mar	Apr	May	Jun	Jul	Aug	Sep	Oct	Nov	Dec	Year
Average precipitation mm (inches)	42.8 (1.69)	28.9 (1.14)	35.0 (1.38)	54.4 (2.14)	62.2 (2.45)	46.4 (1.83)	65.1 (2.56)	65.4 (2.57)	54.7 (2.15)	60.3 (2.37)	38.6 (1.52)	46.5 (1.83)	600.3 (23.63)
Source: Bureau of Meteorology

== Notable residents ==
- Jim Matthews - Australian rules footballer and tennis player, born and raised
- Rex Hartwig - International tennis player. Born and raised in Culcairn.
- Andrew Hoy - Triple Olympic equestrian Gold medallist was born and raised.
- Bradley Clyde - rugby league player, born
- Jeremy Finlayson - Australian rules footballer, born and raised
- Iilysh Retallick - Australian Idol 2025 finalist, born and raised https://tvblackbox.com.au/page/2025/04/06/gisella-iilysh-and-marshall-battle-for-australian-idol-glory-tonight-on-channel-7/

== Transport ==
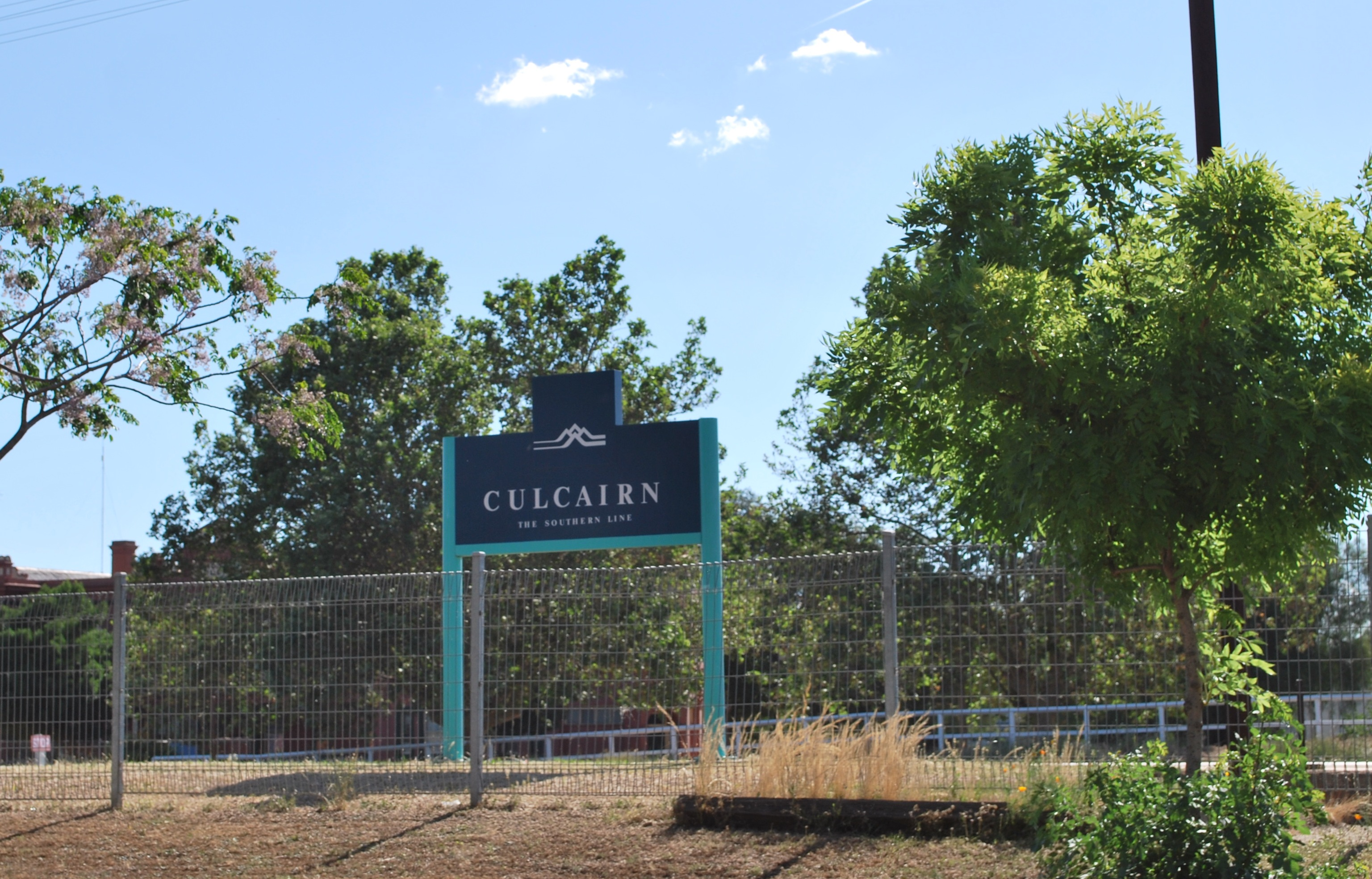
Culcairn Railway Station Sign

Culcairn sits on the main railway line between Sydney and Melbourne and is serviced by the NSW TrainLink XPT service which runs twice daily and stops at the local railway station. The station was once the junction for the Corowa and Holbrook branch lines.
