= Ettamogah railway station =

Former railway station in New South Wales, Australia

Ettamogah

General information
- Location: Wagga Road, Thurgoona, New South Wales; Australia
- Coordinates: 36°01′15″S 146°58′50″E
- Elevation: 212 metres (696 ft)
- Operator: Public Transport Commission
- Line: Main Southern line
- Distance: 637.260 km (395.975 mi) from Central
- Platforms: 1 (1 side)
- Tracks: 1

Construction
- Structure type: Ground

Other information
- Status: Demolished

History
- Opened: 3 February 1881
- Closed: 4 May 1975

Services
Preceding station	Former services	Following station
Albury Racecourse towards Albury	Main Southern Line	Table Top towards Sydney
Location

Ettamogah railway station was a railway station on the Main Southern line, serving the suburb of Thurgoona in Albury, New South Wales, Australia. The station opened in February 1881 and closed in May 1975. The railway station was demolished, with no extant remains left.
