= Table Top railway station =

Former railway station in New South Wales, Australia

Table Top

General information
- Location: Perryman Lane, Table Top, New South Wales; Australia
- Coordinates: 35°58′10″S 147°00′14″E
- Elevation: 244 metres (801 ft)
- Operator: State Rail Authority
- Line: Main Southern line
- Distance: 631.101 km (392.148 mi) from Central
- Platforms: 2 (1 island)
- Tracks: 4

Construction
- Structure type: Ground

History
- Opened: 3 February 1881
- Closed: c.1984

Services
Preceding station	Former services	Following station
Ettamogah towards Albury	Main Southern Line	Gerogery towards Sydney
Location

Table Top railway station was a railway station on the Main Southern line, serving the town of Table Top in the Riverina, New South Wales, Australia. The station opened on 3 February 1881 and consisted of a substantial brick station building and a signal box. It was closed in the 1980s and subsequently demolished in the 1980s, although some remains are still extant.
