= Jeremy Finlayson =

Australian rules footballer

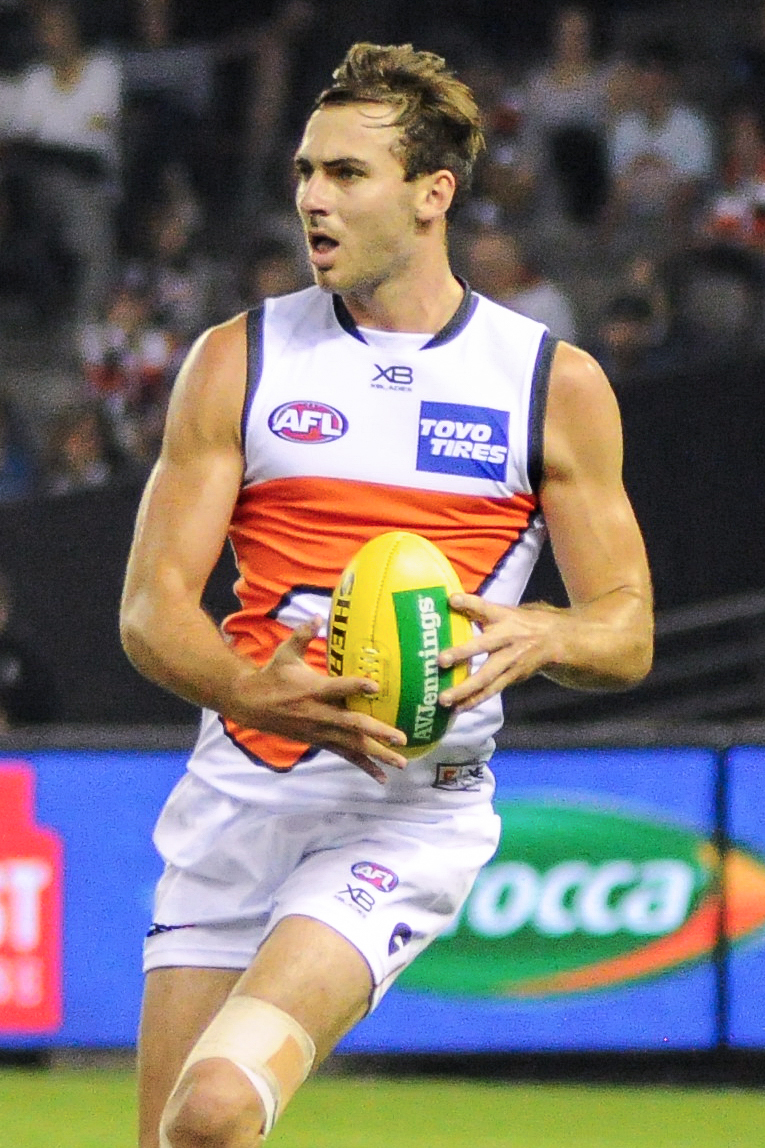
- Finlayson playing for Greater Western Sydney in April 2018

Personal information
- Full name: Jeremy Finlayson
- Born: 9 February 1996 (age 30); Albury, New South Wales
- Original teams: Culcairn, Sydney Hills (NEAFL)
- Draft: No. 85, 2014 national draft
- Debut: Round 15, 2017, Greater Western Sydney vs. Geelong, at Spotless Stadium
- Height: 197 cm (6 ft 6 in)
- Weight: 94 kg (207 lb)
- Position: Key forward / ruck

Playing career
| Years | Club | Games (Goals) |
| 2015–2021 | Greater Western Sydney | 66 (90) |
| 2022–2025 | Port Adelaide | 62 (76) |
| Total | | 128 (166) |

Representative team honours
| Years | Team | Games (Goals) |
| 2025 | Indigenous All-Stars | 1 (0) |

Career highlights
- Port Adelaide leading goalkicker: (2023)

Jeremy Finlayson (born 9 February 1996) is a former professional Australian rules footballer who played for Greater Western Sydney and Port Adelaide in the Australian Football League (AFL).

== Personal life ==
Finlayson was born in Culcairn, New South Wales, into a family of Indigenous Australian (Yorta Yorta) descent. He grew up playing an array of sports including cricket, lawn bowls and tennis but mostly focused on Australian rules football. Finlayson attended Billabong High School in Culcairn and played his junior football with the Culcairn Lions in the Hume Football League, making his senior debut for the club in 2012 at the age of 16.

In late 2012, he moved to Sydney to join the GWS Giants' academy program full time to increase his chances of being drafted. Finlayson was selected with the 85th pick in the 2014 AFL draft. He completed his high school education at Patrician Brothers' College, Blacktown.

Finlayson married Kellie Gardner in 2023. Kellie learned in August 2021 she was diagnosed with terminal lung and bowel cancer just a few months after giving birth to a daughter with her future husband; she started chemotherapy in 2024.

== AFL career ==
Finlayson made his debut against Geelong at Spotless Stadium in Round 15 of the 2017 season.

Finlayson was traded to Port Adelaide via request, citing family reasons at the conclusion of the 2021 AFL season.

After four seasons at Port Adelaide, Finlayson was delisted at the end of the 2025 season.

== Statistics ==
Legend
| G | Goals | K | Kicks | D | Disposals | T | Tackles |
| B | Behinds | H | Handballs | M | Marks |

| Season | Team | No. | Games | Totals | | | | | | | Averages (per game) | | | | | | | Votes |
| Season | Team | No. | Games | G | B | K | H | D | M | T | G | B | K | H | D | M | T | Votes |
|---|---|---|---|---|---|---|---|---|---|---|---|---|---|---|---|---|---|---|
| 2017 | Greater Western Sydney | 31 | 1 | 0 | 0 | 0 | 4 | 4 | 0 | 3 | 0.0 | 0.0 | 0.0 | 4.0 | 4.0 | 0.0 | 3.0 | 0 |
| 2018 | Greater Western Sydney | 31 | 14 | 4 | 1 | 161 | 68 | 229 | 55 | 14 | 0.3 | 0.1 | 11.5 | 4.9 | 16.4 | 3.9 | 1.0 | 0 |
| 2019 | Greater Western Sydney | 31 | 23 | 44 | 25 | 217 | 69 | 286 | 118 | 35 | 1.9 | 1.1 | 9.4 | 3.0 | 12.4 | 5.1 | 1.5 | 0 |
| 2020 (Note: The 2020 season was played with 17 home-and-away matches per team (down from 22) and 16-minute quarters with time on (down from 20-minute quarters with time on) due to the impact of the COVID-19 pandemic.) | Greater Western Sydney | 31 | 15 | 19 | 10 | 102 | 21 | 123 | 38 | 36 | 1.3 | 0.7 | 6.8 | 1.4 | 8.2 | 2.5 | 2.4 | 0 |
| 2021 | Greater Western Sydney | 31 | 13 | 23 | 9 | 106 | 35 | 141 | 40 | 15 | 1.8 | 0.7 | 8.2 | 2.7 | 10.8 | 3.1 | 1.2 | 2 |
| 2022 | Port Adelaide | 11 | 20 | 21 | 15 | 201 | 104 | 305 | 77 | 44 | 1.1 | 0.8 | 10.1 | 5.2 | 15.3 | 3.9 | 2.2 | 1 |
| 2023 | Port Adelaide | 11 | 22 | 38 | 38 | 207 | 72 | 279 | 102 | 40 | 1.7 | 1.7 | 9.4 | 3.3 | 12.7 | 4.6 | 1.8 | 6 |
| 2024 | Port Adelaide | 11 | 12 | 12 | 17 | 102 | 45 | 147 | 41 | 18 | 1.0 | 1.4 | 8.5 | 3.8 | 12.3 | 3.4 | 1.5 | 0 |
| 2025 | Port Adelaide | 11 | 8 | 5 | 5 | 51 | 20 | 71 | 29 | 8 | 0.6 | 0.6 | 6.4 | 2.5 | 8.9 | 3.6 | 1.0 | 0 |
| Career | | | 128 | 166 | 120 | 1147 | 438 | 1585 | 500 | 213 | 1.3 | 0.9 | 9.0 | 3.4 | 12.4 | 3.9 | 1.7 | 9 |
