= Corowa railway line =

Non-operational railway line in New South Wales, Australia

Overview
- Owner: Transport Asset Manager of New South Wales
- Locale: Riverina
- Termini: Culcairn; Corowa

History
- Opened: 1892

Technical
- Line length: 47.24 miles (76.03 km)
- Track gauge: 4 ft 8 1/2 in (1,435 mm)

The Culcairn – Corowa railway line is a non-operational railway branch line in southern New South Wales, Australia. It branched off of the Main Southern railway line at Culcairn and headed south-west to the town of Corowa on the Murray River. The southern terminus was near the Victorian Railways Springhurst – Wahgunyah railway, but no bridge was ever provided over the river.

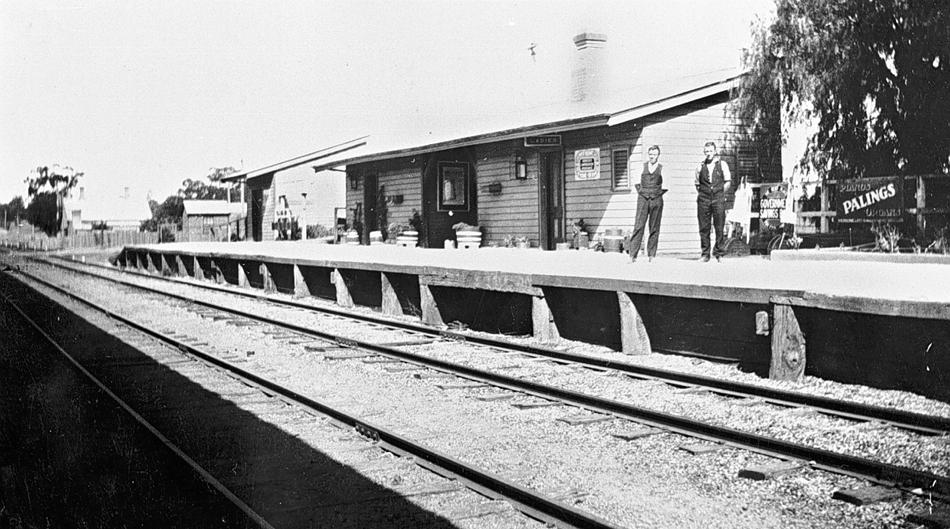
Brocklesby station c.1925

== History ==
Construction was underway prior to 1891 with the line opening on 3 October 1892 and its main purpose was for the transport of wheat. Railway ballast was also carried along this line for use on the NSW rail network out of the 'Hurricane Hill' quarry siding. Passenger services ceased in 1975, a time when the widespread closure of country branch-line passenger services occurred. The section from Corowa to Brocklesby was decommissioned in January 1989; the last train (An XPT Xp2006 “City of Wagga Wagga” set known as 'The Federation Flyer') ran on that section on 24 January 1988. The section from Brocklesby to Culcairn was decommissioned in December 1991.

== Current status ==
The old tracks have not yet been removed from their original position but the line itself is in reasonable condition.

NSWSRA removed a majority of the station amenities following the mothballing of the line in 1991.

There has been renewed interest in reinstating the rail line as a heritage railway by the proposed Culcairn-Corowa Heritage Railway Assoc.

== See also ==
- Rail transport in New South Wales

== Railway line coords ==
- 35.666099°S 147.038234°E Culcairn
- 35.677792°S 147.030112°E Burkitts Creek
- 35.682346°S 147.023474°E Red Creek
- 35.704342°S 146.991354°E Billabong
- 35.714003°S 146.977452°E Weeamera
- 35.720700°S 146.967630°E Hurricane Hill
- 35.731476°S 146.950407°E Back Creek
- 35.771000°S 146.882282°E Petries Creek
- 35.762666°S 146.900580°E Walla Walla
- 35.796473°S 146.785277°E Burrumbuttock
- 35.805292°S 146.738955°E Orelda
- 35.821096°S 146.678938°E Brocklesby
- 35.846503°S 146.516359°E Balldale
- 35.890140°S 146.438457°E Hopefield
- 35.994287°S 146.388659°E Corowa
