= Springhurst railway station =

Railway station in Victoria, Australia

Springhurst
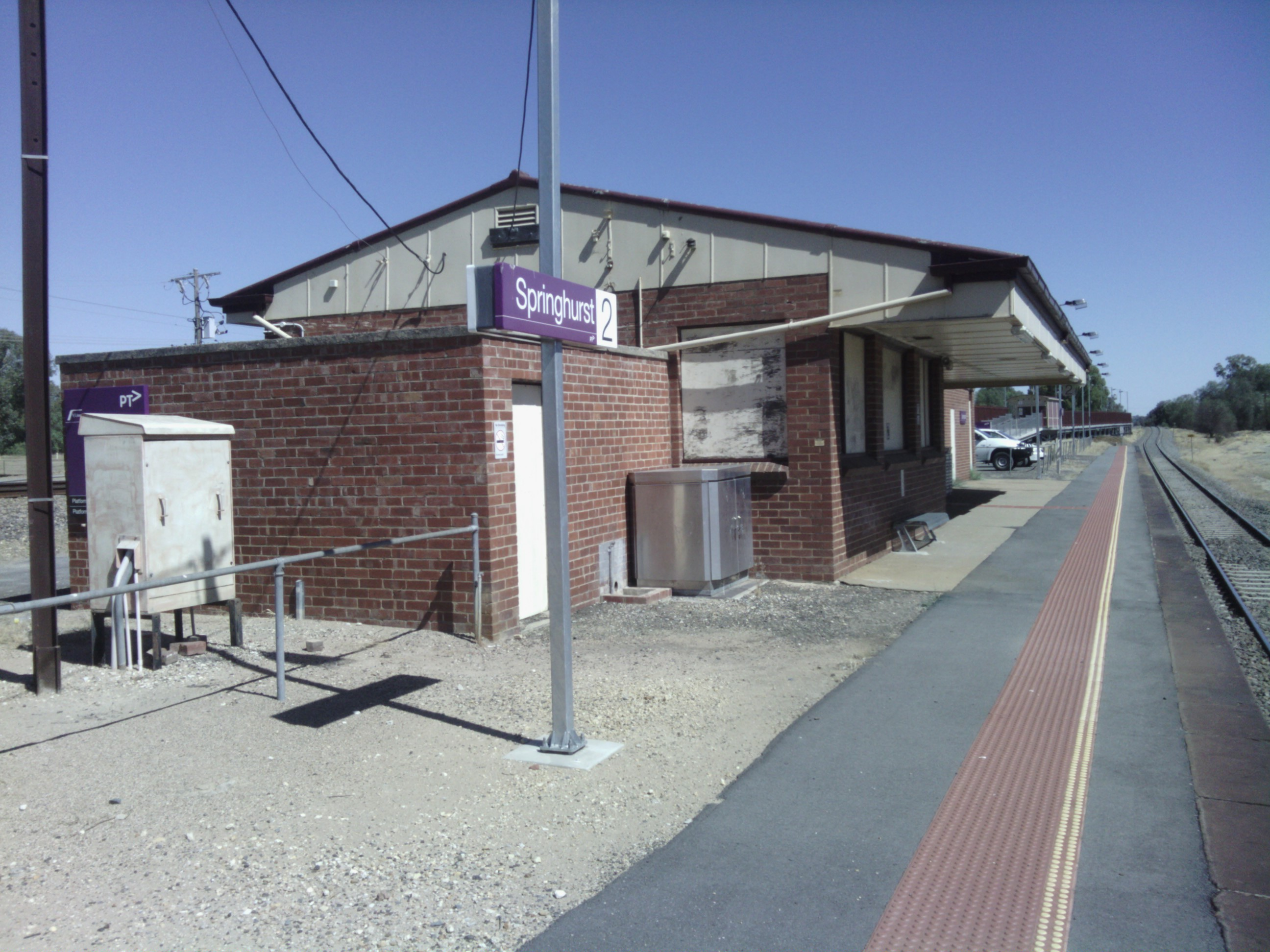
- Southbound view from Platform 2, March 2015

General information
- Location: Silo Street, Springhurst, Victoria 3682; Rural City of Wangaratta; Australia
- Coordinates: 36°11′10″S 146°28′14″E
- System: PTV regional rail station
- Owner: VicTrack
- Operator: V/Line
- Line: Albury (North East)
- Distance: 257.55 kilometres from Southern Cross
- Platforms: 2 side
- Tracks: 2
- Connections: Coach

Construction
- Structure type: Ground
- Parking: Yes
- Cycle facilities: Yes
- Accessible: Yes

Other information
- Status: Operational, unstaffed
- Station code: SPT
- Fare zone: Myki zone 22
- Website: Public Transport Victoria

History
- Opened: 29 November 1873; 152 years ago
- Rebuilt: 1950; 76 years ago 2011; 15 years ago
- Former names: Springs (1873-1890); Bontherambo; Naringa

Services
Preceding station	V/Line	Following station
Wangaratta towards Southern Cross	Albury line	Chiltern towards Albury
Former services
Preceding station	VicRail	Following station
Bowser towards Spencer Street	Albury line	Chiltern towards Albury
Terminus	Wahgunyah line	Rutherglen towards Wahgunyah
Location
- Location within Victoria

Springhurst railway station is located on the North East line in Victoria, Australia. It serves the town of the same name, and opened on 29 November 1873 as Springs. It was renamed Springhurst in October 1890.

== History ==
Springhurst handled heavy traffic from the Wahgunyah district, until the opening of the Wahgunyah branch line in 1879. A weatherboard station building was erected in 1878, next to a through-track goods shed that had been provided earlier. Track layout alterations were made in 1885, 1899, 1906 and 1919.

A signal cabin was provided in 1887, but was moved into the station building in 1899. Also in that year, the platform was extended to 110 metres. The present brick station building dates to 1950. The adjacent Albury - Melbourne standard gauge line and road underpass were built in 1962.

In 1969, a siding leading to the former turntable was abolished. In September 1979, the former goods shed was demolished. In 1990, No. 5 road and siding "A" were abolished, as was the connection from No. 2 road to the Wahgunyah line.

The original platform (now Platform 2) was located on the former broad gauge line. In 2011, that line was converted to standard gauge, and another platform (Platform 1) was built on the existing standard gauge line, which had opened in 1962.

In recent years, the station has had very low patronage. In 2016–2017, it only recorded 1,566 passengers, or around four passengers a day.

Bowser station, now demolished, was located between Springhurst and Wangaratta.

== Platforms and services ==
Springhurst has two side platforms. It is served by V/Line Albury line trains.

Springhurst platform arrangement
Platform	Line	Destination
1	Albury line	Southern Cross
2	Albury line	Albury

== Transport links ==
V/Line runs a road coach service from Corowa to Wangaratta (via Rutherglen), which operates Monday – Friday.

== Gallery ==
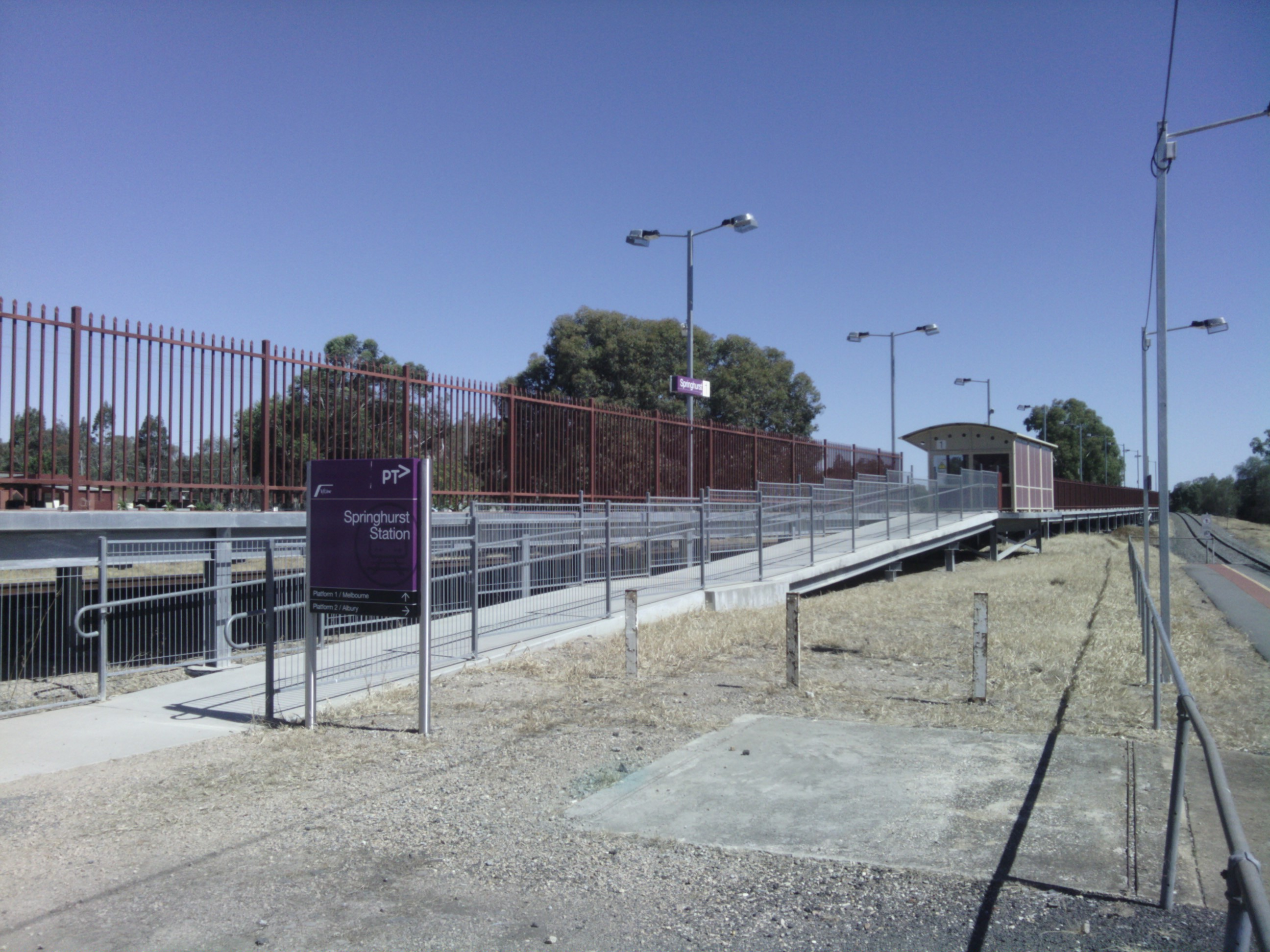
Southbound view of Platform 1, March 2015
