= Gerogery level crossing accident =

2001 train accident in New South Wales

Coordinates: 35.879228°S 147.000675°E

Details
- Date: 27 January 2001; 4:07 pm AEDT
- Location: near Gerogery
- Country: Australia
- Operator: CountryLink
- Incident type: Derailment

Statistics
- Trains: 1
- Vehicles: 1
- Deaths: 5

Gerogery level crossing, now an overpass named 'Five Mates Crossing'

At 4:07 pm AEDT, on 27 January 2001, an XPT bound for Melbourne collided with a car at the Gerogery level crossing at Bells Road on the Olympic Highway, where the road crossed the Main Southern railway in Gerogery, New South Wales, Australia.

The incident resulted in five fatalities. Although the train derailed in the impact, there were no deaths to the train passengers or crew. The crash site extended for more than 1 km south of the level crossing, with vehicle, train and rail track debris found throughout.

The accident served as a focal point for the commencement of reforms to the design, operation and management of railway level crossings across Australia.

Data from the National Level Crossing Safety Strategy showed that in 2022 79% of more than 20,000 level crossings in Australia had only passive means of protection (stop or give way signs), and not bar gates or red flashing lights.

== Location ==
Far from being a typical level crossing where a straight road crosses a straight railway line, the Gerogery level crossing was a more complicated road-rail interface involving an important main road (the Olympic Highway), another minor road, and the railway line (the Main Southern railway):

- the main road had an at-grade intersection with the single track railway at the level crossing.
- the road did sharp left and right bends, with the approach from the north on the western side of the railway line, turning and traversing the line before turning again to run south on the eastern side of the railway line.
- the dog leg, or section of the road that traversed the railway line, ran roughly east–west and may have put the sun in drivers' eyes during sunrise and sunset in the summer months.
- because of the road delineation and bends, the red flashing lights warning of the imminent approach of a train could not properly point and provide sufficient warning to drivers on the main road and minor road approaches.
- the five young men killed, teenagers from Wagga Wagga, had all recently received their driving licences.
- the crossing had no boomgates, as these were only considered necessary where there were two or more tracks, and gates were needed to protect against a "second train coming".

This crash, through the intervention of the local State member, Mr Daryl Maguire MP, Member for Wagga Wagga led the NSW Government to request the Joint Standing Committee on Road Safety (the STAYSAFE Committee) of New South Wales Parliament to conduct a review of the safety of railway level crossings. The report of the Committee (STAYSAFE 56, 2004) was a comprehensive review of road, vehicle, driver and railway-related factors involved in level crossing incidents and crashes. The findings and recommendations of the report led to major reform of railway level crossing safety across Australia.

=== Five Mates Crossing ===
Following the deaths, an overbridge was built to remove the level crossing, with completion on 16 December 2005. Originally costed in 2001 at $12.5 million, by June 2004 the cost had increased to $18.5 million, and was finally completed at a cost of $24.5 million. The overbridge is named the "Five Mates Crossing" bridge, in memory of the five young men, all friends, who were killed: Kyle Michael Wooden, Luke Gellie Milne, Cameron Michael Tucker, Graham Charles Kelly and Ben Wilkins. They had been heading to Albury to attend an evening rugby league match. Commemorative crosses and memorial plate were set alongside the Olympic Highway 50 metres south of the crossing on the northbound lane, but were removed around 2019.

The bridge has faced ongoing criticism since its opening in 2006. It was argued that the steep ascent and descent combined with the sharp junction and no turning lane presents a danger to drivers. Particularly those crossing in trucks, farm machines and other agricultural vehicles that are limited in the speed.

== Inquest ==
The inquest into the Gerogery level crossing deaths necessarily canvassed a wide variety of issues in road and rail transport. The inquest also examined questions of driver behaviour, notably the common belief that level crossing crashes can often be caused by drivers seeking to "beat the train" and not be delayed in their journey by stopping for a train to pass over the level crossing. Indeed, during the coronial inquiry, evidence given by one train passenger suggested the teenagers had been racing to beat the train through the crossing.

This testimony was strenuously refuted by the families of the boys. At the Coronial Inquest, Coroner Mr Carl Milovanovich said of the allegation:

In my view there is certainly one hypothesis that can be discounted immediately, and that is a suggestion that the boys were attempting to race the train. The fact that this version of events received so much publicity, and by innuendo given unwarranted credibility, was most unfortunate and most distressing for the families of the deceased. I wish to make it very clear to the family and to the media who will no doubt report this matter, that I, as coroner, have categorically rejected any suggestion that the boys were attempting to race the train.

Rather, the design of the level crossing itself was seen as contributing to the deaths of the five young men. In summing up, Mr Milovanovich stated:

The acute angle of the curve from a 100 km/h area leaves little room for braking if the bells or lights are not seen or heard or for a person who may not be familiar with that section of the road.

The coroner went on to say:

The real tragedy in this matter is not whether the driver made an error of judgement, but that in this day and age when we all strive to reap the benefits of new technology, such as computers, advances in medicine, trains that travel at 160 km/h and even faster, we still have a 19th-century approach to level crossings on the basis that they are traversed by horse and cart.

Since 2001 there has been significant reform to the management of railway level crossings, not only in New South Wales but nationally across Australia. The STAYSAFE Committee of New South Wales Parliament has held two further inquiries, and the Parliament of Australia and the Parliament of Victoria have also conducted parliamentary committee investigations into railway level crossing safety.

The CRC for Rail Innovation is conducting a number of research projects into railway level crossing design, management, and technology. There is also a research program underway to improve driver and other road user behaviour safety at railway level crossings. The CRC for Rail Innovation is a collaborative venture between leading organisations in the Australian rail industry and Australian Universities and is supported by the Commonwealth Government. It is planned that the CRC for Rail Innovation will invest around A$100m in rail industry research over the 2007-2013 period. This makes it the single biggest research program in the history of Australian railways.

== Legacy ==
The families of the victims of the accident continue to campaign for safety upgrades to level crossings, particularly in rural areas.

The roadside memorial on the Olympic Highway to the victims is maintained by family and community members.
