= Wahgunyah railway station =

Former railway station in Victoria, Australia

Coordinates: 36°00′39″S 146°24′07″E

Wahgunyah

General information
- Line: Wahgunyah

Other information
- Status: Closed

History
- Opened: 29 January 1897
- Closed: 10 April 1978

Services
Preceding station	VicRail	Following station
Rutherglen towards Springhurst	Wahgunyah line	Terminus
Location

Wahgunyah is a closed station, located in the town of Wahgunyah, on the Wahgunyah railway line, in Victoria, Australia.

The station officially closed on 10 April 1978.
