= Rutherglen railway station, Victoria =

Former railway station in Victoria, Australia

Coordinates: 36°03′12″S 146°27′42″E

Rutherglen
- Rutherglen railway station circa 1910

General information
- Line: Wahgunyah

Other information
- Status: Closed

History
- Opened: 29 January 1879
- Closed: 10 April 1978

Services
Preceding station	VicRail	Following station
Springhurst Terminus	Wahgunyah line	Wahgunyah Terminus
Location

Rutherglen is a closed station on the Wahgunyah railway line, located in the town of Rutherglen, in Victoria, Australia.

The Wahgunyah line was opened as a whole from Springhurst to Wahgunyah in 1879. The passenger service was withdrawn on 13 April 1962, the last branch line mixed train to operate in Victoria. A crossover between No. 2 and 3 tracks was abolished in 1973. The station officially closed on 10 April 1978. The following year, in 1979, the goods shed was demolished.

Freight services were suspended in 1995, with the line practically closed. The 'Green Trail Associates Group' operated a trolley service over the line between Wahgunyah and Rutherglen for a number of years, known as the 'Stringybark Express – Lil Red Postal Motor'. In 2002, the line was handed back to the Victorian Government by lease holder Freight Australia, and in 2006, it was announced that the Murray to the Mountains Rail Trail would be built along the closed line, with 9 kilometres of trail.
