= Tabletop, New South Wales =

Rural area in Australia

Coordinates: 35°58′S 147°00′E

Table Top is a small village in the state of New South Wales, Australia. It serves a rural community. It is on the main south railway line between Sydney and Melbourne, and lies on the Hume Highway approximately 16 kilometres north of Albury.

== Railway ==
The railway has a crossing loop at Table Top. Under the Auslink plan, the line between the previous station to the north at Gerogery and Table Top will be duplicated. The duplicated line was going to be about 14 km long and would have allowed for so-called running crosses, where trains in opposing directions need not slow down or stop, and where flights of trains can also pass each other. Due to cost considerations, the length of the passing lanes were reduced to about 6.5 km.
