= Springhurst, Victoria =

Springhurst
- Town
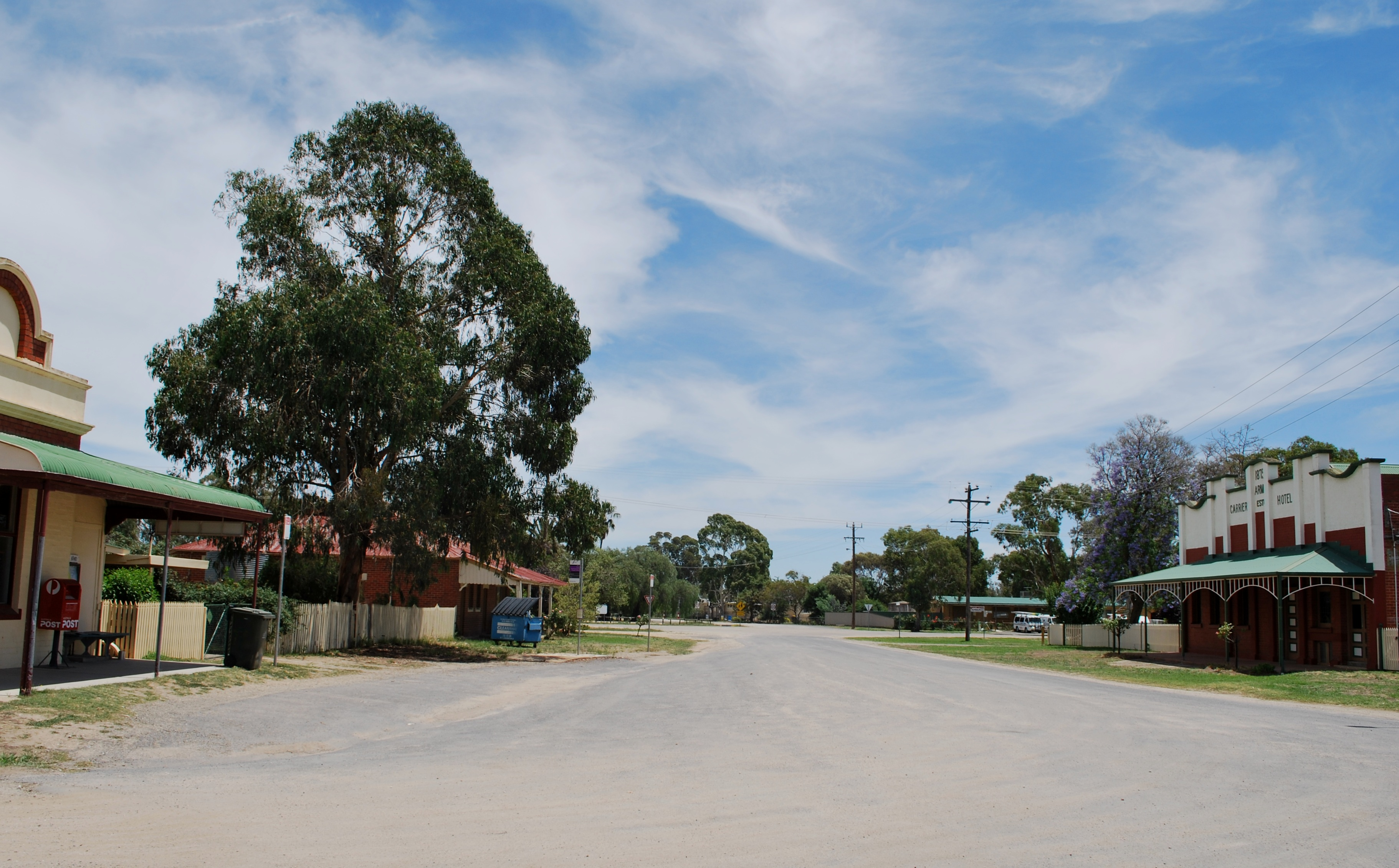
- The main street of Springhurst, 2009. The post office is on the left, the Carriers Arms Hotel on the right

- Interactive map of Springhurst
- Coordinates: 36°11′S 146°28′E
- Country: Australia
- State: Victoria
- Region: Hume
- LGA: Rural City of Wangaratta
- Location: 280 km (170 mi) NE of Melbourne; 26 km (16 mi) NE of Wangaratta; 16 km (9.9 mi) S of Rutherglen

Government
  - State electorate: Ovens Valley
  - Federal division: Indi

Population
  - Total: 348 (2016 census)
- Postcode: 3682

Springhurst is a town in north-eastern Victoria, Australia. It is in the Rural City of Wangaratta local government area, 280 kilometres (170 mi) north east of the state capital and 16 km from the city of Wangaratta. At the 2016 census, Springhurst and the surrounding area had a population of 348.

Springhurst was on the Hume Highway between Melbourne and Sydney, but has now been bypassed by the Hume Freeway. Springhurst railway station was the junction for a branch line to Wahgunyah, on the Murray River. The line was closed in the early 1990s. The township has run a first Friday of every month, nighttime social group in the recreation hall for people to get to know others in the area.

== Transport links ==
Springhurst has a station on the North East railway line from Albury to Melbourne. From Monday to Friday, there is a road coach service from Corowa to Wangaratta, via Rutherglen, that stops at the post office.

== Springhurst Football Club ==
Springhurst Football Club had been established by 1893, and competed in the Chiltern & District Football Association in 1913 and 1914, in 1919 and 1920, from 1922 to 1927, in 1930, from 1933 to 1937, in 1939, and from 1950 to 1956, after which the Chiltern & District Football Association folded.

Springhurst played in the Ovens and Murray Football League in 1921, but returned to the Chiltern & District Football Association in 1922.

In 1905, Springhurst defeated Chiltern Valley No.2 to win the Federal Junior Football Association premiership.

In 1920, Springhurst went through the season without losing a game and defeated Lake Rovers in the Chiltern & District Football Association grand final.
