= Holbrook railway line =

Former railway line in New South Wales

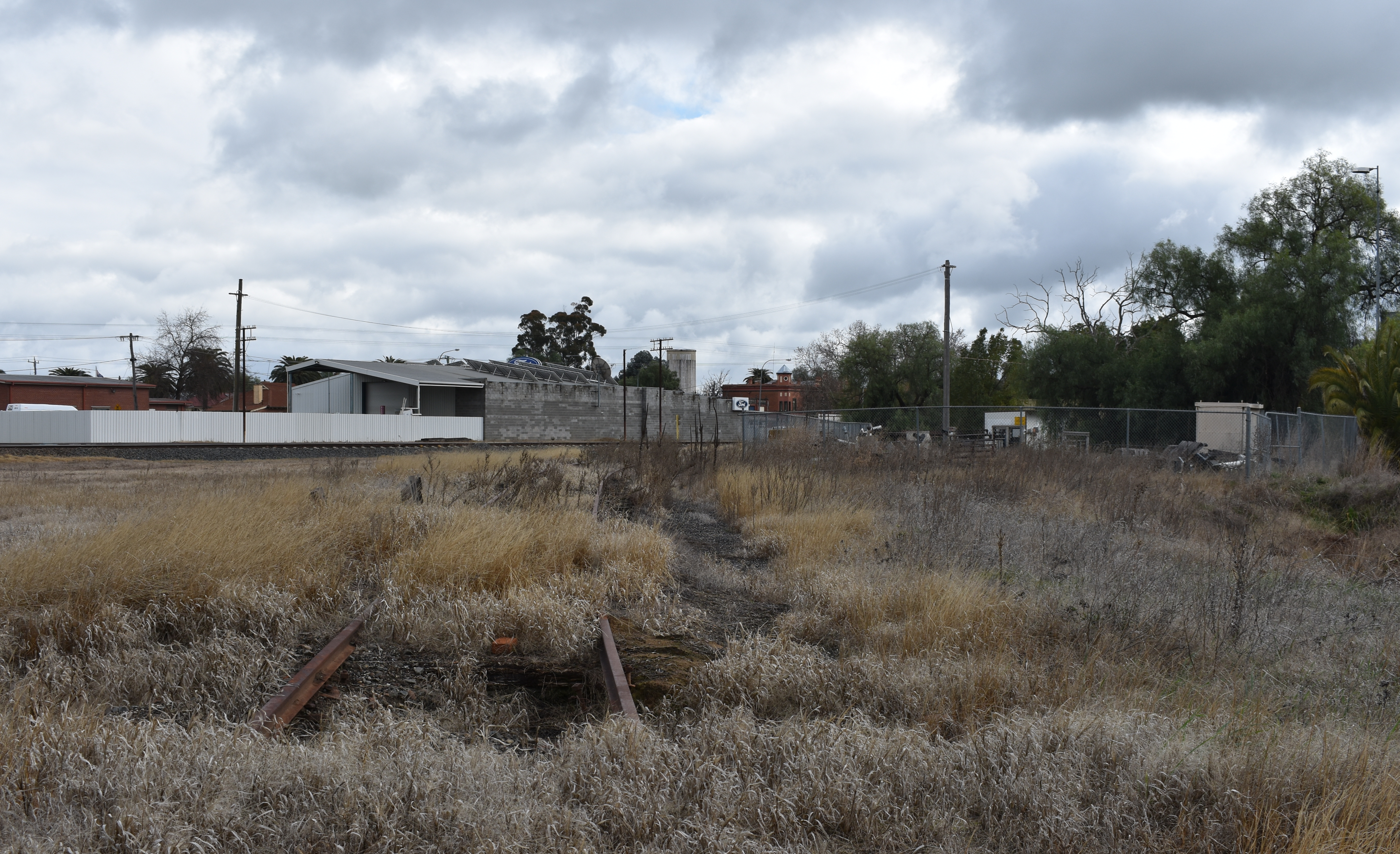
- Branching off the Great Southern Railway in Culcairn, 2018

Overview
- Owner: Transport Asset Manager of New South Wales
- Locale: Riverina, New South Wales
- Termini: Culcairn; Holbrook
- Stations: 4

History
- Opened: 18 September 1902
- Closed: 2 February 1987

Technical
- Line length: 26.18 kilometres (16.27 miles)
- Track gauge: 1,435 mm (4 ft 8 1/2 in)

The Culcairn to Holbrook railway line is a short, closed, railway line in New South Wales, Australia. The line ran from the Main South railway line at Culcairn for 26 km east to the town of Holbrook.

== Construction ==
Following the line from Culcairn to Corowa being completed in 1892, the locals of Germanton campaigned hard for their own railway line.

The line was authorised early in 1901 with surveying being worked on up until March. Tenders for supplies were accepted from April through June with construction starting in July. The line opened on 18 September 1902. Holbrook was, at that time, known as Germanton. The name was changed in 1915 following anti-German feelings which arose as a consequence of World War 1. The new name commemorates the exploits of Lieutenant-Commander Norman Holbrook.

== Services on the line ==
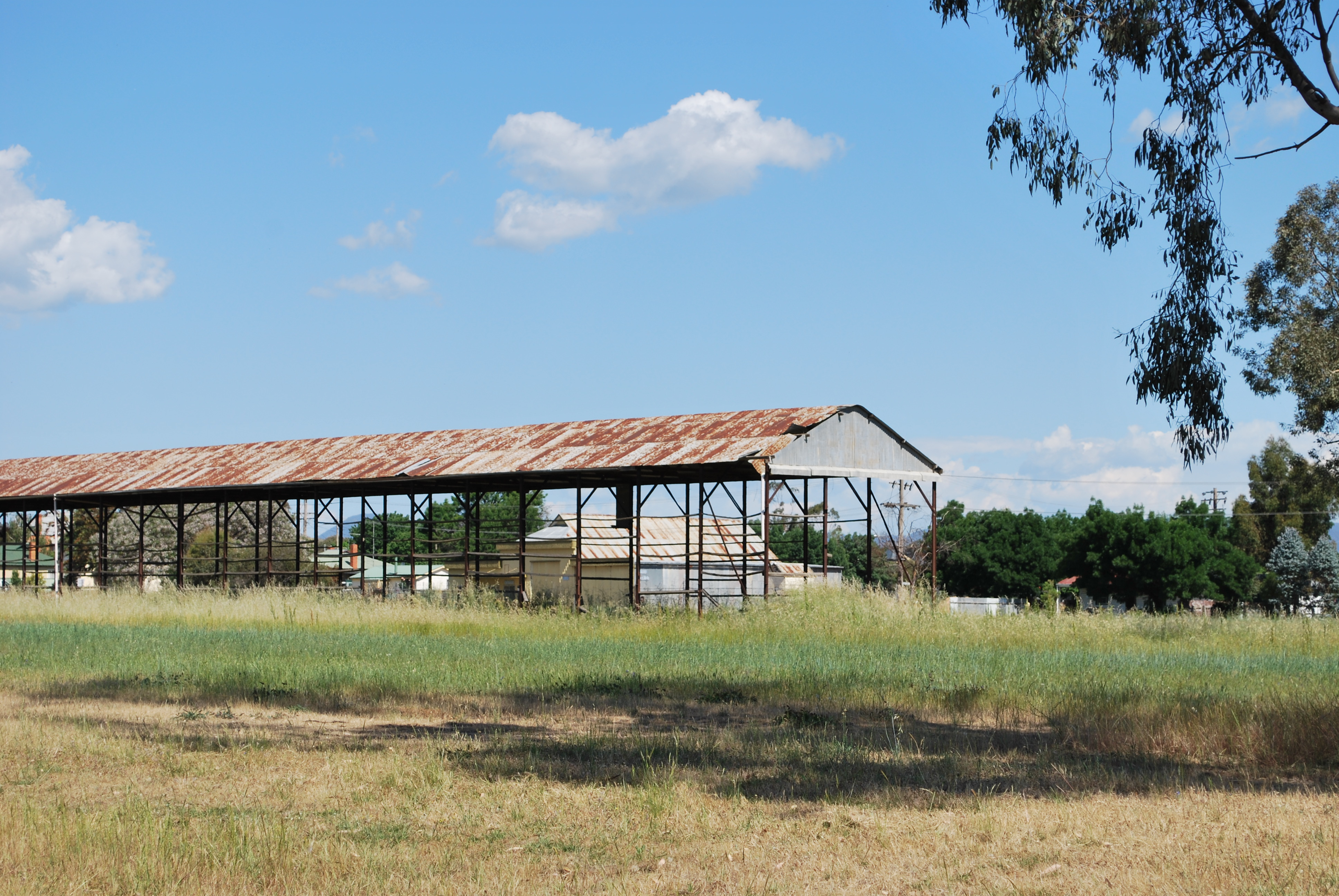
Holbrook railway yards

The initial service on the line consisted of a mixed train that operated in both directions on Mondays, Wednesdays and Fridays, connecting with the overnight Mail Trains to and from Sydney.

From 18 December 1923, the thrice weekly mixed train was replaced by a CPH railmotor which operated twice a day in each direction on Tuesdays, Thursdays and Saturdays. A goods train operated on Mondays. The railmotor service was short-lived and mixed trains returned from 18 November 1924, but now making one return trip on Tuesdays, Thursdays and Saturdays.

From 26 August 1929, the mixed train was reduced to running only twice weekly and, by 1946, this had been further reduced to running on Mondays only.

Dieselisation of the line took place from 11 February 1962, using 48 class locomotives.

Passenger services ceased completely from 12 October 1970. Goods services continued to operate on Mondays until 8 July 1974 when all regularly scheduled trains ceased.

The last revenue train to operate on the line was a livestock special on 7 March 1978.

The line was officially closed on 2 February 1987. Much of the infrastructure remained along the line afterwards.

== Coordinates ==
- 35.666085°S 147.038213°E – Culcairn station
- 35.672226°S 147.040464°E – Billabong Creek
- 35.677400°S 147.044671°E – Burkitt's Creek trestle
- 35.683787°S 147.107209°E – Morven station
- 35.691927°S 147.166091°E – Fellow Hills station
- 35.692707°S 147.180725°E – Mountain Creek trestle
- 35.691195°S 147.187280°E – Ten Mile Creek trestle
- 35.689698°S 147.224601°E – Ralvona station
- 35.689413°S 147.228214°E – Willow Bend Creek trestle
- 35.717251°S 147.308657°E – Holbrook station
