= Performing arts in Australia =

The performing arts in Australia are an important element of the Arts in Australia and Australian culture.

== Dance ==
Dance in Australia is diverse, ranging from The Australian Ballet to the Restless Dance Company to the many local dance studios.

== Music ==
=== Aboriginal music ===
Aboriginal song was and remains an integral part of Aboriginal culture since time immemorial. The most famous feature of their music is the didgeridoo. This wooden instrument, used amongst the Aboriginal clans of northern Australia, makes a distinctive droning sound and its use has been adopted by a wide variety of non-Aboriginal performers.

Aboriginal musicians have turned their hand to Western popular musical forms, often to considerable commercial success. Some notable examples include Archie Roach, the Warumpi Band, NoKTuRNL and Yothu Yindi.

=== Pop and rock ===
Australia has produced a wide variety of popular music. While many musicians and bands (some notable examples include the 1960s successes of The Easybeats and the folk-pop group The Seekers, through the heavy rock of AC/DC and the slick pop of INXS and more recently Savage Garden have had considerable international success, there remains some debate over whether Australian popular music really has a distinctive sound. Perhaps the most striking common feature of Australian music, like many other Australian art forms, is the dry, often self-deprecating humour evident in the lyrics.

Until the late 1960s, many have argued that Australian popular music was largely indistinguishable from imported music: British to begin with, then gradually more and more American in the post-war years. The sudden arrival of the 1960s underground movement into the mainstream in the early 1970s changed Australian music permanently: Skyhooks were far from the first people to write songs in Australia, by Australians, about Australia, but they were the first ones ever to make money doing it. The two best-selling Australian albums ever made (at that time) put Australian music on the map. Within a few years, the novelty had worn off and it became commonplace to hear distinctively Australian lyrics and sometimes sounds side-by-side with the imitators and the imports.

The national expansion of ABC youth radio station Triple J during the 1990s has greatly increased the visibility and availability of homegrown talent to listeners nationwide. Since the mid-1990s a string of successful alternative Australian acts have emerged – artists to achieve both underground (critical) and mainstream (commercial) success include silverchair, Grinspoon, Powderfinger and Jet.

=== Classical music ===
The first Australian musician of any sort to achieve international fame was operatic soprano Nellie Melba, in the late 19th century. Well-known soprano Joan Sutherland is also from Australia.

Australia has a considerable history of classical performance, with symphony orchestras established around the state capitals in the early 20th century, as well as opera companies and other musical ensembles. However, relatively few Australian classical compositions have achieved lasting recognition.

== Organisations ==
There are a number of major performing arts organisations engaged in the performing arts. There was an enguiry held in 1999, chaired by Helen Nugent, the report of the enquiry led to significant change, particularly in government support through the Australia Council and the then Department of Communications, Information Technology and the Arts.

=== PAC Australia ===
Performing Arts Connections Australia (PAC Australia), formerly the Australian Performing Arts Centres Association (APACA), is the peak national body for performing arts centres. It is the national voice for performing arts presenters, as a membership and service organisation they represent and support performing arts presenters, venues, producers and creators in Australia through industry development and training, market development initiatives, and research and advocacy, enabling the conditions for presenters, artists and audiences to thrive.

It was founded some years before 2003, and changed its name to PAC Australia in 2017.. As of 2026 it has over 250+ members, which include arts centres, independent producers and producing companies, festivals, performing arts consultants, agencies and funding bodies.

In 2003 APACA created the Drover(s) Awards, to recognise excellence in performing arts touring. As of 2019, there were two awards: the Drover Award for Performing Arts Centre of the Year, and Drover Award for Tour of the Year. The awards were not held in 2020 and 2021 owing to the impact of the COVID-19 pandemic in Australia.

From 2022, the format and name were changed to the IMPACT Awards. The PAC Australia IMPACT Awards celebrate excellence in performing arts leadership, new thinking and best practice, with a focus on lasting impact in communities. The criteria for the IMPACT Awards are intentionally broad to attract nominations that reflect the complexity and diversity of the ever-evolving arts industry. The highest achievement in the awards is the Wendy Blacklock Industry Legend Award, which rewards exceptional, long-time service to the performing arts industry. The Award honours the illustrious career and the services of Wendy Blacklock AM, who is a pioneer of national touring and founder of Performing Lines. This award was won by Stephen Page in its inaugural year. Adelaide-based ActNow Theatre won one of the four other awards given to performers, while Home of the Arts (HOTA), a venue in Surfers Paradise, won an Innovator Award.

In 2026 the Wendy Blacklock Industry Legend Award was won by Rhoda Roberts AO. The Performing Arts Centre of the Year award went to Merrigong Theatre Company and the Innovator Award went to Queensland Ballet and Queensland Health.

PAC Australia is also the host of the Australian Performing Arts Exchange (APAX) and the current host of the Australian Performing Arts Market (APAM). The Australian Performing Arts Exchange is the national market and professional development gathering for performing arts workers across Australia. In 2025 APAX was held in Garramilla/Darwin and in 2026 APAX will be held in Meanjin/Brisbane.

APAM is a strategic initiative of Creative Australia, to showcase Australian and Aotearoa/New Zealand contemporary dance, theatre, music, emerging and experimental arts, nationally and internationally.

From 2026 - 2030 APAM will be hosted in Boorloo/Perth, Western Australia and produced by PAC Australia. APAM was created in 1994, initially established by the Australia Council for the Arts to boost international and national touring and has grown into an internationally respected performing arts marketplace.

=== Significant Australian performing arts organisations ===
Significant performing arts organisations include:

Performing art	Australia	ACT	NSW	NT	Queensland	SA	Tasmania	Victoria	WA
Dance: Ballet					Queensland Ballet			The Australian Ballet	West Australian Ballet Company
Dance: Contemporary			Sydney Dance Company and Bangarra Dance Theatre		Dancenorth	Australian Dance Theatre			
Education	*Aboriginal Centre for the Performing Arts The Australian School of Performing Arts	Canberra Academy of Dramatic Art	National Institute of Dramatic Art, National Aboriginal Islander Skills Development Association (NAISDA) Dance College, Australian Film Television and Radio School, and Sydney Conservatorium of Music		Queensland Conservatorium Griffith University	Helpmann Academy		Australian National Academy of Music, Australian Ballet School, Flying Fruit Fly Circus School, National Institute of Circus Arts, and Melbourne Conservatorium of Music (part of the Faculty of Fine Arts and Music, University of Melbourne)	Western Australian Academy of Performing Arts
Festivals			Sydney Festival	Garma Festival of Traditional Cultures	Brisbane Festival	Adelaide Festival, Adelaide Fringe and WOMADelaide		Melbourne International Arts Festival and Melbourne Fringe Festival	Perth International Arts Festival
Funding Agencies	Australia Council and Department of the Environment, Water, Heritage and the Arts	ArtsACT	NSW Ministry for the Arts	Department of the Arts and Museums	Arts Queensland	Arts SA	Arts Tasmania	Arts Victoria	ArtsWA
Music: Choral	Australian Boys Choir The Australian School of Performing Arts The Australian Girls Choir								
Music: Chamber	Australian Festival of Chamber Music		Australian Chamber Orchestra and Musica Viva Australia					Astra Chamber Music Society and Melbourne International Chamber Music Competition	
Music: Orchestra	Australian World Orchestra and Symphony Services International		Sydney Symphony Orchestra	Darwin Symphony Orchestra	Queensland Symphony Orchestra	Adelaide Symphony Orchestra	Tasmanian Symphony Orchestra	Melbourne Symphony Orchestra	West Australian Symphony Orchestra
Music: Orchestra (Pit)			Australian Opera and Ballet Orchestra		Queensland Philharmonic Orchestra			Orchestra Victoria	
Music: Youth Orchestra	Australian Youth Orchestra		Sydney Youth Orchestra and SBS Radio and Television Youth Orchestra					Melbourne String Ensemble and Melbourne Youth Orchestra	
Opera			Opera Australia		Opera Queensland Operatif	State Opera Company of South Australia		Victorian Opera	West Australian Opera
Theatre: Physical								Circus Oz	
Theatre: Text Based			Merrigong Theatre Company, Company B Ltd, Sydney Theatre Company, Griffin Theatre Company, and The Bell Shakespeare Company Ltd		Queensland Theatre Company; La Boite Theatre Company; Tropic Sun Theatre Company; JUTE	State Theatre Company of South Australia		Melbourne Theatre Company and Malthouse Theatre	Black Swan Theatre Company
Venues			Illawarra Performing Arts Centre (Wollongong), Sydney Opera House		Queensland Performing Arts Centre; Judith Wright Centre of Contemporary Arts : Bille Brown Studio at Queensland Theatre Company; Metro Arts	Adelaide Festival Centre	Salamanca Arts Centre, Hobart	Victorian Arts Centre, Hamer Hall, Melbourne, and Melbourne Recital Centre	His Majesty's Theatre and The Playhouse Theatre

== See also ==
- Performing arts education in Australia
- List of concert halls in Australia and New Zealand
