= Wodonga =

- City
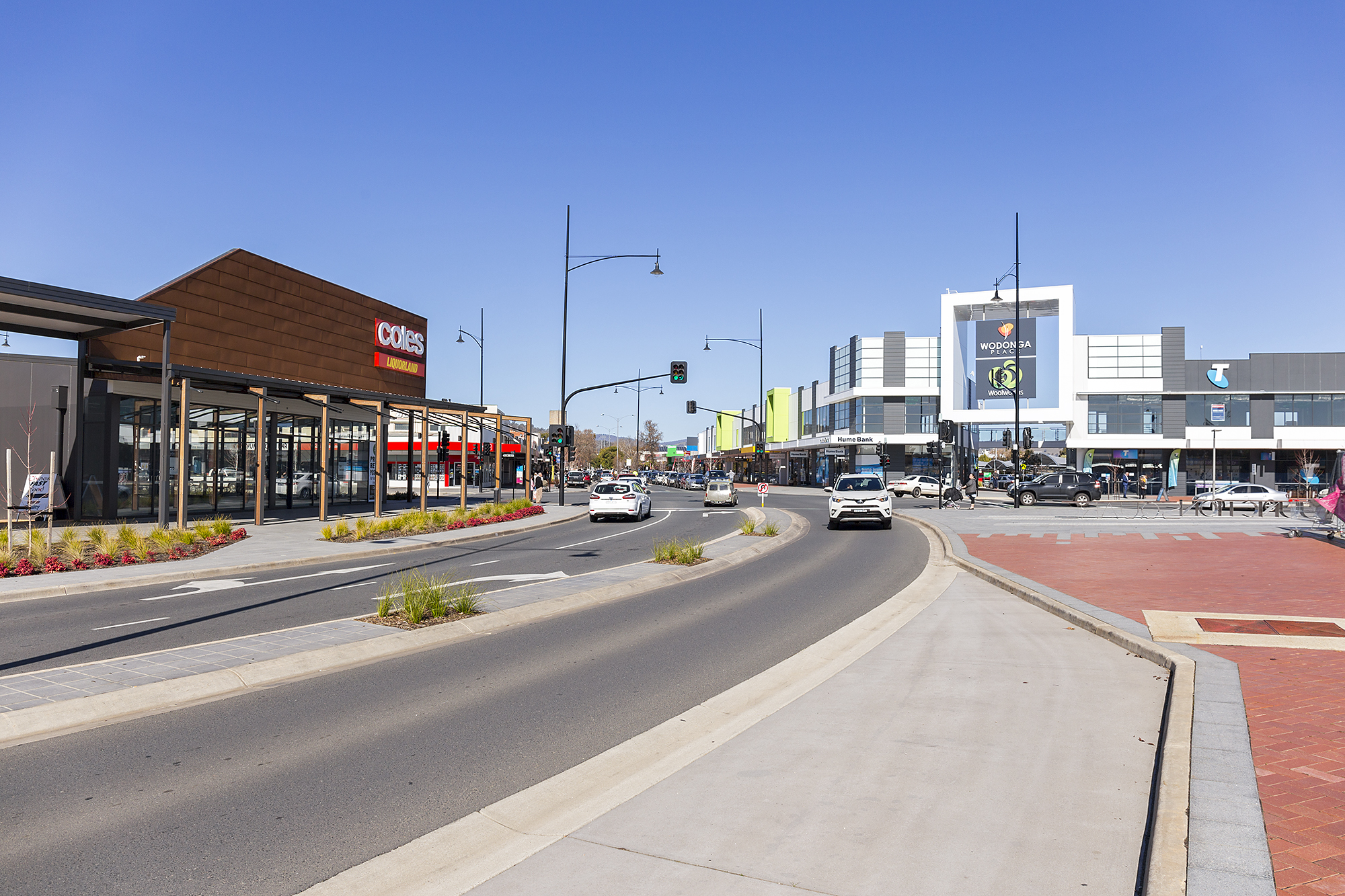
- Looking down High Street in the CBD of Wodonga

- Interactive map of Wodonga
- Coordinates: 36°07′17″S 146°53′17″E
- Country: Australia
- State: Victoria
- Region: Hume
- LGA: City of Wodonga
- Location: 559 km (347 mi) SW of Sydney; 324 km (201 mi) NE of Melbourne; 353 km (219 mi) SW of Canberra; 307 km (191 mi) NE of Bendigo; 69 km (43 mi) NE of Wangaratta
- Established: 1852

Government
  - State electorate: Benambra
  - Federal division: Indi

Area
  - Total: 54.2 km^{2} (20.9 sq mi)
- Elevation: 152 m (499 ft)

Population
  - Total: 37,839 (2021 census)
  - Density: 698.1/km^{2} (1,808.2/sq mi)
- Time zone: UTC+10 (AEST)
  - Summer (DST): UTC+11 (AEDT)
- Postcode: 3690
- County: Bogong
- Mean max temp: 22.2 °C (72.0 °F)
- Mean min temp: 8.9 °C (48.0 °F)
- Annual rainfall: 714.6 mm (28.13 in)
Localities around Wodonga
New South Wales	Gateway Island	Gateway Island
West Wodonga	Wodonga	Bandiana
Huon Creek	Leneva	Leneva

Wodonga (/wəˈdɒŋɡə/ wə-DONG-gə; Pallanganmiddang: Wordonga) is a city on the Victorian side of the border with New South Wales, 324 kilometres (201 mi) north-east of Melbourne, Australia. It is part of the twin city of Albury–Wodonga and is located all within the boundaries of the City of Wodonga LGA and is separated from its twin city in New South Wales, Albury, by the Murray River. As of the 2021 Census, Wodonga and its suburbs have a population of 37,839 and combined with Albury, the two cities form the urban area Albury–Wodonga with a population of 97,793. There are multiple suburbs of Wodonga including Bandiana, Baranduda, Barnawartha, Bonegilla, Ebden, Huon Creek, Killara, Leneva and Staghorn.

Wodonga produces a gross domestic product of $2.57 billion per year on average.

== History ==
Founded as a customs post with its twin city Albury on the other side of the Murray River, the town grew subsequent to the opening of the first bridge across the Murray River in 1860. Originally named Wodonga, its name was changed to Belvoir then later back to its original name: Wodonga.

The Post Office opened 1 June 1856 although known as Belvoir until 26 July 1869. It had previously been regarded as the smaller, less prosperous cousin of the two. Whilst still somewhat smaller than Albury, economic growth in both areas has ameliorated such distinctions.

The local Indigenous Waywurru name for the area, "Wordonga", refers to an edible plant or nut found in lagoons.

== Government and politics ==
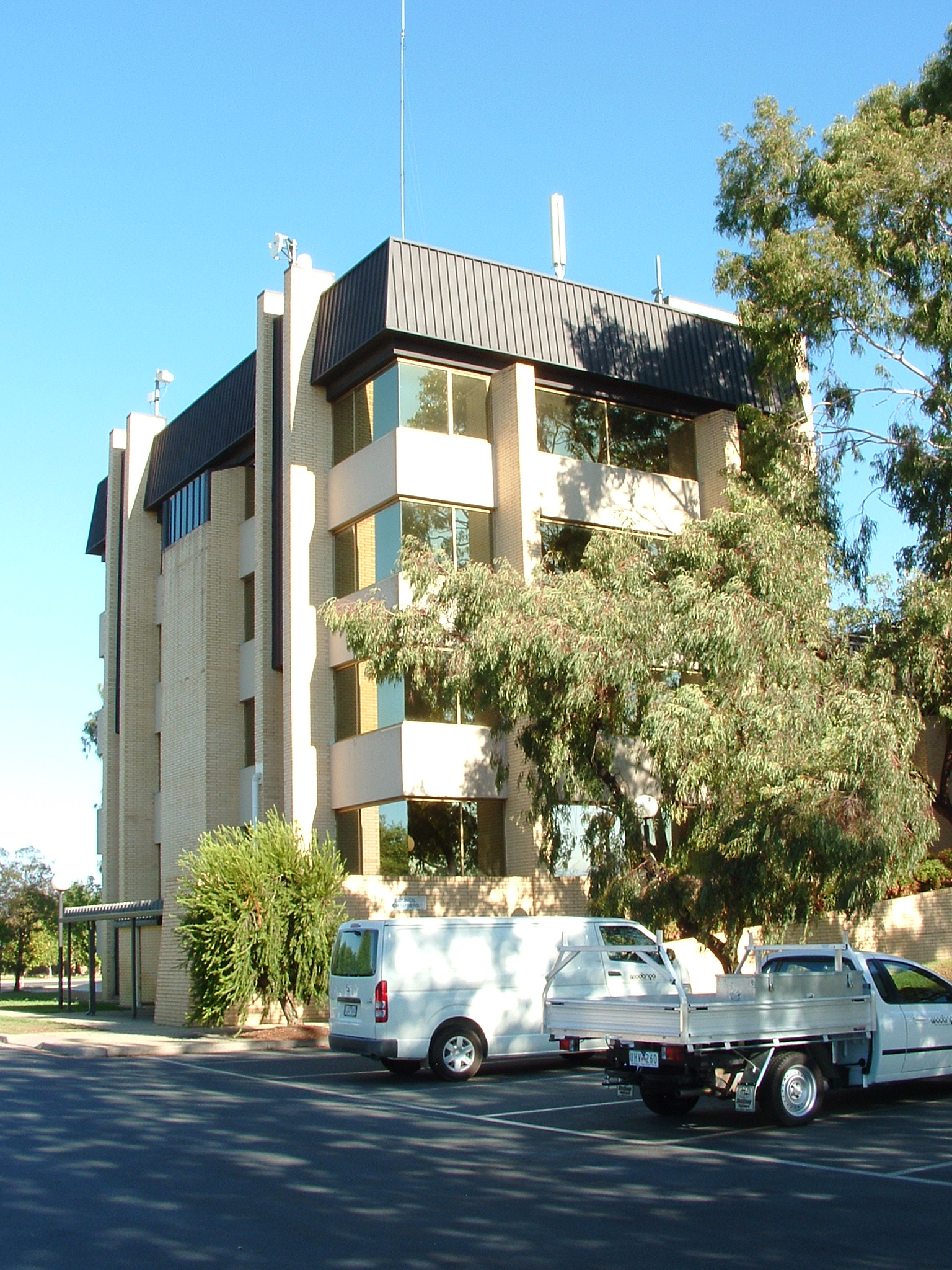
Wodonga City Council Offices

Wodonga is in the federal Division of Indi. Independent MP Helen Haines has represented Indi since the 2019 Australian federal election. Indi was held by the Liberal–National Coalition from 1931 until 2013 when it was won by independent Cathy McGowan. When Helen Haines won the seat in 2019, succeeding Cathy McGowan, it was the first time in Australian history that one independent had succeeded another.

Wodonga is in the Victorian Electoral district of Benambra. Bill Tilley of the Liberal Party has represented the electoral district of Benambra since the 2006 Victorian state election. Benambra has been held by the Liberal–National Coalition since the 1932 Benambra by-election, and has never been held by the Labor Party. In the 2018 and 2022 Victorian elections, the seat became a close race between Bill Tilley and independent candidate Jacqui Hawkins, with Tilley narrowly retaining the seat.

Wodonga is the largest population centre in both Indi and Benambra.

The local government area covering Wodonga is City of Wodonga, and as of 2025 the current mayor is Michael Gobel (independent).

== Culture ==
Much of the arts and theatrical activity in the region is conducted in a cross-border fashion; for instance HotHouse Theatre is located almost equidistant from the Wodonga and Albury city centres.

Wodonga is served by the Apex Club of Wodonga, the Wodonga Lions Club and two Rotary Clubs – Belvoir Wodonga and Wodonga. Community Service is important to the Wodonga Community and activities such as the cities Australia Day Celebrations, Christmas Carols and the display of Santa's throughout the City over the festive season would not be possible without community service clubs. Recently Apexian Dean Freeman was awarded National Apexian of the Year for community service efforts throughout the area and overseas.

=== Popular culture ===
Leonard Hubbard recorded the song Wodonga in 1924.

The World's Biggest Rolling Pin (listed in the Guinness Book of World Records) is located in Wodonga, atop "Henri's Bakery".

== Sport ==
Like much of country Victoria, Wodonga has a large and valued sporting culture. There are many sporting grounds in, and around, the area, and they are often frequented by the public in a social manner, when not being used for organised sport.

There are three Australian rules football clubs in Wodonga, the Wodonga Football Club, the Wodonga Raiders Football Club and the Wodonga Saints Football Club. Wodonga and Wodonga Raiders compete in the Ovens & Murray Football League, while the Wodonga Saints compete in the Tallangatta & District Football League. There are many other sporting clubs in the region. Brisbane Lions dual-premiership player Daniel Bradshaw and St Kilda forward Fraser Gehrig are originally from Wodonga.

Wodonga is also home to a number of cricket clubs which compete in the Cricket Albury Wodonga (CAW) competition. These include the Belvoir Eagles, Wodonga Bulldogs and Wodonga Raiders.

Cyclists are catered for by the Albury Wodonga Cycling Club. The Albury Wodonga Cycling Club holds club races most weekends, is part of the Riverina Interclub and hosts the annual John Woodman Memorial Wagga to Albury Cycling Classic.

Golfers play the course at SS&A Wodonga on Parkers Road.

Wodonga has two rugby league clubs called the Wodonga Wombats and Bonegilla Gorillas that play in the Murray Cup. Former clubs include the Wodonga Storm and Wodonga Bears, both of whom were involved in Victorian Rugby League competitions.

Australian Socceroos Archie Thompson and Joshua Kennedy played for soccer team Twin City Wanderers as children. Wodonga Diamonds Football Club and Wodonga Heart Football Club are two other soccer clubs based in Wodonga. All three clubs compete in the Albury Wodonga Football Association, in which Wodonga Diamonds helped establish and is historically the most dominant club. In early 2014, a new club representing the region and playing its games in Wodonga was founded as Murray United F.C. Murray United's senior structure has since ceased to exists, and now the club only fields junior teams throughout various tiers of Junior NPL.

Wodonga's Tennis Centre is the largest inland tennis complex in Australia and incorporates not only tennis but also croquet and lawn bowls. The centre has 32 natural grass courts, 8 synthetic grass courts with lights for night use, and 10 plexicushion courts with lights for night use.

Wodonga has a horse racing club, the Wodonga & District Turf Club, which schedules around seven race meetings a year including the Wodonga Cup meeting in November.

The Albury-Wodonga Motorcycle Club are located at Diamond Park on the southern part of Gateway Island, on the north side of the Murray River and organise motor cycle events. The motorcycle speedway track has hosted important events including the final of the 2024 Australian Speedway Championship.

Wodonga also has a BMX club, which is situated in a complex near the home ground of local AFL team, Wodonga Raiders.

Wodonga has a radio-controlled car site with both on-road and off-road tracks on the Lincoln Causeway, next to the speedway track.

== Climate ==
The city gets around 125.1 clear days annually, largely in the summer and early autumn. Winters are rainy and cloudy, however, with breaks of sunny days during periods of high pressure systems.

Climate data for Wodonga (1954–1968, rainfall 1898–2023); 156 m AMSL; 36.12° S, 146.91° E
Month	Jan	Feb	Mar	Apr	May	Jun	Jul	Aug	Sep	Oct	Nov	Dec	Year
Record high °C (°F)	44.1 (111.4)	45.4 (113.7)	38.8 (101.8)	31.6 (88.9)	25.4 (77.7)	22.9 (73.2)	22.1 (71.8)	21.9 (71.4)	28.3 (82.9)	32.8 (91.0)	39.4 (102.9)	41.1 (106.0)	45.4 (113.7)
Mean daily maximum °C (°F)	31.8 (89.2)	31.2 (88.2)	28.1 (82.6)	22.9 (73.2)	16.8 (62.2)	14.1 (57.4)	12.6 (54.7)	14.7 (58.5)	18.0 (64.4)	21.5 (70.7)	25.5 (77.9)	28.6 (83.5)	22.2 (72.0)
Mean daily minimum °C (°F)	15.2 (59.4)	15.3 (59.5)	12.7 (54.9)	9.0 (48.2)	5.6 (42.1)	4.1 (39.4)	3.1 (37.6)	4.2 (39.6)	5.7 (42.3)	8.5 (47.3)	10.4 (50.7)	13.2 (55.8)	8.9 (48.0)
Record low °C (°F)	7.6 (45.7)	6.6 (43.9)	3.5 (38.3)	1.9 (35.4)	−1.8 (28.8)	−3.2 (26.2)	−3.9 (25.0)	−2.4 (27.7)	−1.8 (28.8)	0.6 (33.1)	1.6 (34.9)	5.3 (41.5)	−3.9 (25.0)
Average precipitation mm (inches)	43.4 (1.71)	39.3 (1.55)	51.1 (2.01)	50.3 (1.98)	64.9 (2.56)	78.5 (3.09)	81.7 (3.22)	77.8 (3.06)	62.3 (2.45)	68.4 (2.69)	49.0 (1.93)	48.3 (1.90)	714.6 (28.13)
Average precipitation days	4.7	4.2	5.6	6.5	9.1	11.5	12.8	12.3	9.7	8.9	6.4	5.6	97.3
Average afternoon relative humidity (%)	30	32	37	44	58	64	65	59	51	48	39	34	47
Mean monthly sunshine hours	313.1	282.5	272.8	228.0	161.2	120.0	127.1	173.6	207.0	260.4	276.0	288.3	2,710
Source 1: Wodonga (temperature, rainfall and humidity)
Source 2: Rutherglen Research (sunshine hours)

== Economy and infrastructure ==
=== Industry ===
Major secondary industries based in Wodonga include a logistics distributions hub (LOGIC), a large cattle market, a pet food factory (Mars Petcare), a can factory (Visy), a cardboard box factory (Opal) and (Visy Board), a hydraulic hose manufacturer (Parker Hannifin), an abattoir, a foundry (Bradken), a polypropylene film manufacturer (Taghleef Industries (formerly Shorko) a concrete pipe & pole manufacturer (Rocla) and a transformer manufacturer (Wilson Transformer Company) as well as a variety of other smaller enterprises. It also serves as a central point for the delivery of government services to the surrounding region. Albury Wodonga is a major transport hub between Melbourne and Sydney, with over 20 transport companies in the area.

It houses the Australian corporate headquarters for Mars. Wodonga is the site of an Australian Army logistics base and a training centre for Army technical apprentices, the Army Logistic Training Centre, which is based at Latchford Barracks and Gaza Ridge Barracks. It is also the home of a campus of La Trobe University and Wodonga Institute of TAFE.

v2food is set to open a manufacturing plant, that will use locally-grown ingredients, in Wodonga in the second quarter of 2020. However, the plant was closed in 2023.

=== Media ===
==== Print ====
A daily tabloid owned by Australian Community Media, the Border Mail, is printed in Wodonga. The Border Mail has offices in both Albury and Wodonga.

==== Television ====
Wodonga is part of the Albury-Wodonga/Murray/North-East Victoria television market and has access to all major TV networks. Channels available include Channel 7 (formerly Prime7 and part of the Seven Network), WIN Television (part of the Nine Network), 10 Regional Victoria (part of Network 10), as well as the Australian Broadcasting Corporation (ABC) and the Special Broadcasting Service, more commonly known as SBS. Several of these networks also offer additional digital-only channels, including ABC Family, ABC Entertains, ABC News, SBS2, 7two, 7mate, 7Bravo, 7flix, 10 Drama, 10 Comedy, Nickelodeon, News24 Regional, 9Gem, 9Go! and 9Life.

Two television news bulletins featuring local content are offered in Albury–Wodonga and the surrounding region. The Seven Network broadcasts its bulletin live at 6.00pm from studios in Canberra. WIN Television's bulletin is produced in Ballarat but features Albury–Wodonga region based content, and airs on delay at 6.30pm. Network 10 also provides short local news updates which are produced in Hobart, Tasmania, however, these do not feature significant local content from the Albury–Wodonga region.

==== Radio ====
There are three commercial radio stations broadcasting into Wodonga that are based over the border in Albury, namely 2AY, Triple M The Border and Hit104.9 The Border. Notably, Hit FM south eastern network is programmed out of the Albury/Wodonga Hub, going to centres around New South Wales, Victoria, Tasmania and into South Australia. Broadcast out of the same building as Triple M The Border, which is also networked to local stations around New South Wales, Victoria, Tasmania and South Australia.

Albury/Wodonga is one radio market, thus advertisements are directed to both sides of the border. The Albury/Wodonga market underwent significant change in 2005 when Macquarie Southern Cross Media bought 105.7 The River from RG Capital, and 2AY and Star FM from the DMG Radio Australia. Due to cross-media ownership laws preventing the ownership of more than two stations in one market, Macquarie was required to sell one of these stations and in September 2005 sold 2AY to the Ace Radio network. 2AY takes its night time programming from Nine Radio. Commercial radio stations from Wangaratta (3NE, Edge FM) can also be received in most parts of Wodonga.

The Australian Broadcasting Corporation produces breakfast and morning radio programs through its local radio network, from the studios of ABC Goulburn Murray located in Wodonga on 106.5FM. The rest of its content is delivered from Melbourne. The ABC also deliver Radio National on 990 AM, ABC Classic on 104.1 FM, ABC NewsRadio on 100.9 FM and Triple J on 103.3 FM.

There is also a community radio station known as 2REM 107.3 FM. The Albury-Wodonga Community Radio station plays a large number of speciality programs including those for the retiree, ethnic and aboriginal communities throughout the day and a range of musical styles including underground and independent artists from 8:00pm onwards.

In addition, the area is serviced by a Radio for the Print Handicapped station, 2APH, on 101.7 FM. Other stations include the Albury–Wodonga Christian Broadcasters' 98.5 The Light, and the dance formatted narrowcaster RawFM on 87.6 FM.

=== Transport ===
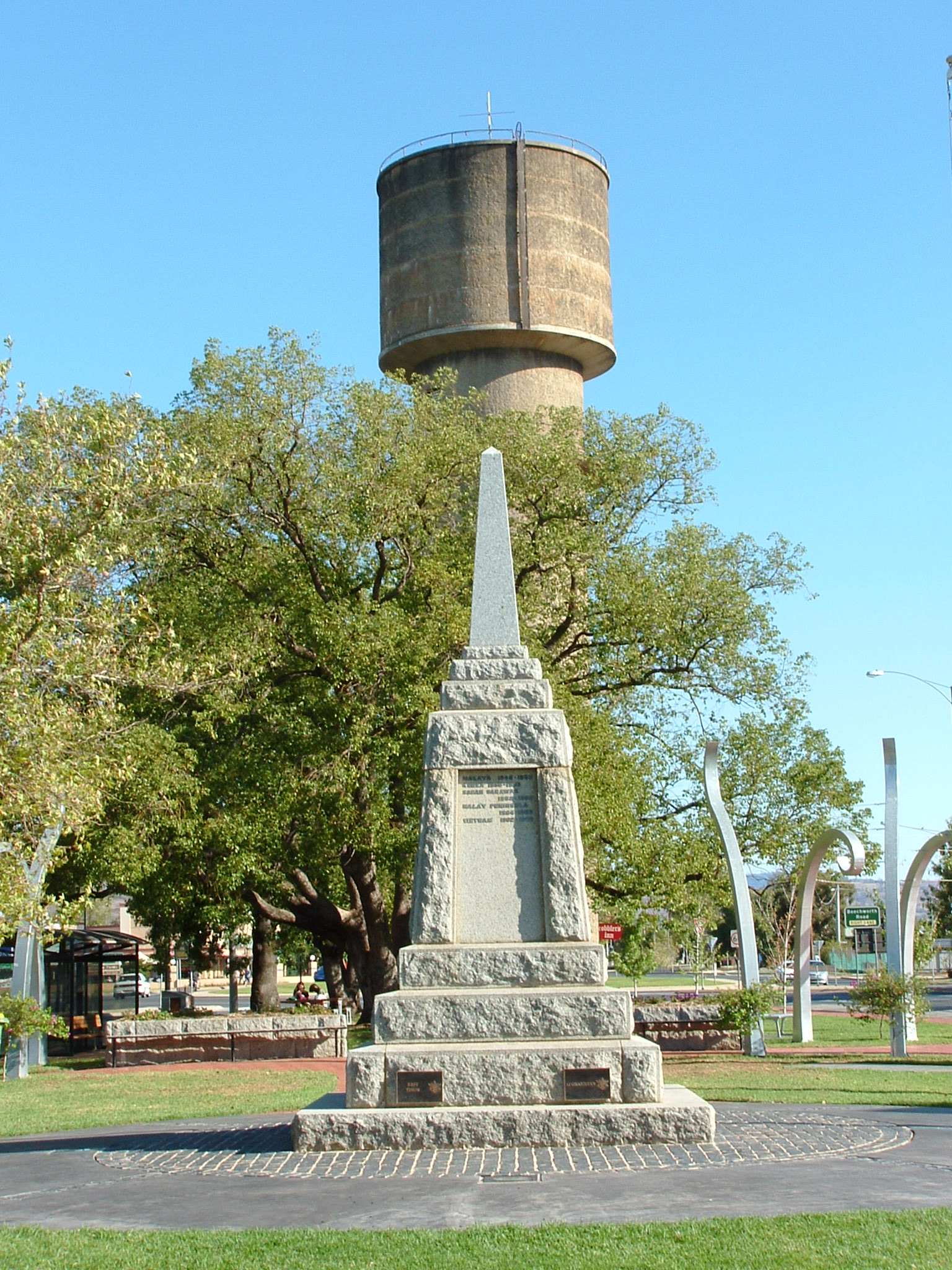
Wodonga water tower and War Memorial at Woodland Grove

Wodonga railway station lies on the North East railway line. A new line was opened in late 2010 bypassing the Wodonga CBD, for which the town held a celebratory day for the last commercial passenger train to pass through the town centre. This line took the rail line out of the centre of town (and removed all of the level crossings), and a new station was built and the line was diverted north of the town to Albury.

Wodonga is on the junction of the Hume Highway (the main route from Melbourne to Sydney) and the Murray Valley Highway (which follows the southern bank of the Murray River).

Local public transport is provided by Dysons (which took over Mylon Motorways) who run buses on a number of routes both within Wodonga and to Albury. Bus services are generally quite infrequent and public transport use in Wodonga is very low. There are also long-distance bus services to the capitals.

There is a comprehensive network of bicycle paths in Wodonga, including one across the Lincoln Causeway to Albury.

Albury Airport, which provides scheduled commuter flights to Melbourne and Sydney, is a short drive from Wodonga.

== Education ==
From 2006, the three government high schools have merged to form a senior college for Years 10, 11 and 12, known as Wodonga Senior Secondary College, and a school for Years 7, 8 and 9, known as Wodonga Middle Years College, on two campuses; Felltimber and Huon Campus. The former 3 public high schools in Wodonga were Wodonga High School, Mitchell Secondary College and Wodonga West Secondary College. Wodonga High School celebrated its 50th birthday in 2005.

Private schools in Wodonga include: Catholic College Wodonga, Trinity Anglican College, Victory Lutheran College, Mount Carmel Christian School, St Augustines Primary School, St Monicas Primary School and St Francis of Assisi Primary School (formerly Frayne College).

Higher education is locally served by the Wodonga Institute of TAFE and La Trobe University. The regional Albury–Wodonga campus of La Trobe University was established in 1991 and provides courses in education, health sciences, biology, and business. The Albury-based campuses of Charles Stuart University, TAFE NSW and the University of New South Wales Rural Clinical School of Medicine are also closely located to Wodonga.

Wodonga is also home to the Flying Fruit Fly Circus School, the educational arm of The Flying Fruit Fly Circus, that provides educational services with an emphasis on the performing arts and contemporary circus training. In 2003 a devastating fire destroyed the school's facilities at, then Wodonga High School, and the school relocated to Wodonga West Secondary College (now Wodonga Middle Years College Felltimber Campus).
