= WBIC =

WBIC may refer to:

- WBIC, Widely applicable Bayesian information criterion in statistics
- WBIC-LP, a low-power radio station (97.3 FM) licensed to serve Wilson, North Carolina, United States
- WYZI, a radio station (810 AM) licensed to serve Royston, Georgia, United States, which held the call sign WBIC from 1990 to 2009
- WBWD (AM), a radio station (540 AM) licensed to serve Islip, New York, United States, which held the call sign WBIC from 1959 to 1967
- Wolfson Brain Imaging Centre
