= WSSC =

WSSC may refer to:

- Washington Suburban Sanitary Commission, the water and sewer system operator for the Maryland suburbs of Washington, DC
- Western Slope Safety Council, a Colorado occupational safety, health, and environmental organization for the oil and gas industry
- Winston-Salem State Teachers College, former name of Winston-Salem State University, a research university in Winston-Salem, North Carolina
- Wodonga Senior Secondary College in Victoria, Australia
- ISU World Synchronized Skating Championships
- WSSC (AM), a Christian radio station in Sumter, South Carolina
