= 810 AM =

AM radio frequency

The following radio stations broadcast on AM frequency 810 kHz: 810 AM is a United States clear-channel frequency. KSFO San Francisco and WGY Schenectady share Class A status on 810 AM.

Because 810 kHz is a multiple of both 9 and 10, the frequency is available for use by broadcast stations in all three ITU regions.

== Argentina ==
- Federal in Buenos Aires
- Mitre in Cordoba

== Australia ==
- 2BA in Bega, NSW
- 6RN in Perth, WA

== Bahamas ==
- C6B-3-AM (still identifies as ZNS-3-AM) in Freeport

== People's Republic of China ==
- BEN49 in Xian

== Colombia ==
- HJCY in Bogotá, Distrito Capital

== Denmark ==
=== Greenland ===
- OYN in Upernavik

== Fiji ==
- 3DX in Labasa

== India ==
- VUR in Rajkot

== Indonesia ==
- PM3B in Bandung
- PM8DBD in Enrekang
- PM2B in Jakarta
- PM3BIS in Majalengka
- 8FW210 in Merauke
- PM3CEC in Tanjung Balai

== Japan ==
- JOKN in Tokyo (Yokota Air Base)

== Mexico ==
- XEAGR-AM in Acapulco, Guerrero
- XECSAA-AM in Cuernavaca, Morelos
- XEEMM-AM in Salamanca, Guanajuato
- XEFW-AM in Tampico, Tamaulipas
- XERB-AM in Cozumel, Quintana Roo
- XERSV-AM in Cd. Obregón, Sonora

== New Zealand ==
- ZL1XD in East Tamaki
- ZL4YA in Highcliff, Shiel Hill

== North Macedonia ==
- Radio Skopje in Skopje

== Papua New Guinea ==
- P2RB in Rabaul

== Philippines ==
- DZRJ-AM in Makati

== Russian Federation ==
- RW34 in Volgograd
- RW439 in Yekaterinburg
- RW637 in Vladivostok

== Spain ==
- EAJ7 in Madrid

== South Korea ==
- MBC in Deagu(Defunct)

== Thailand ==
- HSKJ-AM in Khon Kaen
- HSLC-AM in Trang

== United Kingdom ==
- BBC Radio Scotland Extra in Burghead and Westerglen

== United States ==
Stations in bold are clear-channel stations.

Call sign	City of license	Facility ID	Class	Daytime power (kW)	Nighttime power (kW)	Critical hours power (kW)	Unlimited power (kW)	Transmitter coordinates
KBHB	Sturgis, South Dakota	9673	D	25	0.06			44.423333°N 103.426944°W
KLVZ	Brighton, Colorado	35089	B	2.2	0.43			40.028056°N 104.8225°W (daytime); 39.843333°N 104.953889°W (nighttime)
**KSFO**	San Francisco, California	34471	A				50	37.526389°N 122.100556°W
KSWV	Santa Fe, New Mexico	36194	D	5	0.01			35.701389°N 105.966111°W
KTBI	Ephrata, Washington	68159	D	50		23		47.356111°N 119.482222°W
KXOI	Crane, Texas	2823	B	1	0.5			31.4775°N 102.34°W
KYTY	Somerset, Texas	210	B	0.25	0.25			29.313333°N 98.508056°W
WCKA	Jacksonville, Alabama	7898	B	50	0.5			33.849444°N 85.762778°W
WEDO	McKeesport, Pennsylvania	161	D	1				40.364167°N 79.812778°W
WEKG	Jackson, Kentucky	28904	D	5				37.578056°N 83.405278°W
**WGY**	Schenectady, New York	15329	A	50	50			42.792222°N 74.012222°W
WHB	Kansas City, Missouri	6384	B	50	5			39.305833°N 94.575°W
WJJQ	Tomahawk, Wisconsin	25346	D	0.94	0.012			45.490556°N 89.726111°W
WKVM	San Juan, Puerto Rico	8096	B				50	18.363056°N 66.136944°W
WMGC	Murfreesboro, Tennessee	12313	D	5	0.006			35.837222°N 86.416667°W
WMJH	Rockford, Michigan	55300	D	3.6				43.118056°N 85.579444°W
WPIN	Dublin, Virginia	17619	D	4.2				37.131944°N 80.618611°W
WRSO	Orlovista, Florida	129548	D	2	0.021			28.571667°N 81.433889°W
WSJC	Magee, Mississippi	74003	B	50	0.5			31.866667°N 89.693056°W
WSYW	Indianapolis, Indiana	13795	D	0.25				39.725556°N 86.185556°W
WWOS	Walterboro, South Carolina	38899	D	5				33.1475°N 80.563056°W
WYRE	Annapolis, Maryland	70352	D	0.25				38.970278°N 76.507778°W
WYZI	Royston, Georgia	3079	D	0.23				34.280556°N 83.119167°W
WZRK	Dodgeville, Wisconsin	17054	D	0.25	0.01			42.919444°N 90.135°W
WZYN	Hahira, Georgia	2307	D	2.5				30.874722°N 83.251667°W

== Uruguay ==
- CX 14 El Espectador in Montevideo
