= WWOS =

WWOS may refer to:

- WWOS (AM), a radio station (810 AM) licensed to serve Walterboro, South Carolina, United States
- WWOS-FM, a radio station (91.9 FM) licensed to serve St. George, South Carolina
- Nine's Wide World of Sports, a long running sports anthology brand on Australian television
- Walking With Our Sisters, a community-based art installation commemorating murdered or missing women and children from Indigenous communities
