= Performing arts education =

Education in the performing arts is a key part of many primary and secondary education curricula and is also available as a specialisation at the tertiary level. The performing arts, which include, but are not limited to dance, music and theatre, are key elements of culture and engage participants at a number of levels.

The endpoint for performing arts education varies: some educators integrate arts into school classrooms to support other curricula while simultaneously building students' art skills, and some focus on performing arts as an academic discipline in itself.

== Performing arts integration ==
Performing arts integration in schools

Integrating performing arts into educational experiences can help students learn other subjects, such as science, as well as help them develop various non-arts-based skills. As children grow, engaging them in performance arts can help them meet developmental milestones, including those for motor skills and psychosocial skills. For example, teachers can integrate performing arts and the discussion thereof into their classrooms to honor student self-expression. Bilingual youth can benefit from this type of arts integration because it offers them modes of communication that can respond more easily to their culture and language than text-based or test-based learning. Regardless of the language used, teachers have found that using performing arts in the classroom, such as improvisational drama, can help students process and prepare for non-arts-based life situations, including bullying.

Issues of access and equity

Despite the benefits of engaging students in performing arts, many students, particularly minority students such as African American and Latino students, do not have equitable access to performing arts in their school classrooms.

== Discipline-based performing arts ==
The performing arts differ from the plastic arts insofar as the former uses the artist's own body, face and/or presence as a medium Performers often adapt their appearance by special clothing, stage makeup, etc.

For students pursuing elite professional careers in performing arts like classical ballet and circus arts, the physical demands are such that early entry into training can be essential.

The breadth of areas covered by the performing arts is wide, including:

- Acting
  - Comedy
  - Drama
  - Magic
  - Film
  - Opera
  - Theatre
- Music
  - Busking
  - Opera
- Dance
- Circus skills
  - Acrobatics
  - Juggling
- Marching arts
- Performance art

== Prominent providers of performing arts education ==
=== Australia ===
- Helpmann Academy
- National Institute of Circus Arts
- National Institute of Dramatic Art
- Western Australian Academy of Performing Arts

=== Germany ===
- Hochschule für Bildende Künste, Braunschweig

=== India ===
- Darpana Academy of Performing Arts
- Kala Academy *Meghalaya Academy of Arts

=== Kuwait ===
- Higher Institute of Musical Arts
- Higher Institute of Theatrical Arts

=== United Kingdom ===
- London Academy of Music and Dramatic Art (LAMDA), founded in 1861
- Royal Academy of Dance (RAD), founded in 1920
- Royal Academy of Dramatic Art (RADA), founded in 1904
- Royal Ballet School, founded in 1931
- Royal Central School of Speech and Drama, founded in 1906

=== United States ===
- Alvin Ailey American Dance Theater, New York City
- American Musical and Dramatic Academy (AMDA), New York City and Los Angeles
- Juilliard School, New York City
- Leland Powers School
- National Dance Institute
- New Orleans Center for Creative Arts (NOCCA)
- The New York Conservatory for Dramatic Arts (NYCDA), New York City
- School of American Ballet, Lincoln Center, New York City, the official academy of the New York City Ballet
- Un-Cabaret Laboratories, teaches alternative comedy writing and performance

== See also ==
- Category:Schools of the performing arts
- Category:Drama schools
- Entertainment
- List of sports
- Performing arts
- Types of martial arts
- Visual arts education
