= WOTC =

WOTC may refer to:

- Wizards of the Coast, an American publisher of fantasy and science fiction games
- Work Opportunity Tax Credit, an American federal tax credit for employers
- XCOM 2: War of the Chosen, the expansion pack to the 2016 turn-based tactics videogame XCOM 2
- WOTC, a radio station in Edinburg, Virginia
