= WQIZ =

WQIZ may refer to:

- WQIZ-LD, a low-power television station (channel 33, virtual 39) licensed to serve Ashland, Ohio, United States
- WWOS (AM), a radio station (810 AM) licensed to serve Walterboro, South Carolina, United States, which held the call sign WQIZ from 1962 to 2015
