= WBOH =

- For the former shortwave radio station, see Fundamental Broadcasting Network
- For the former cable-only CW affiliate, see The CW Plus
