= Flying Fruit Fly Circus School =

Circus school in Australia

Coordinates: 36°07′50″S 146°53′26″E

Information
- Established: 1987; 39 years ago
- Affiliation: The Flying Fruit Fly Circus
- Website: www.fruitflyschool.vic.edu.au

The Flying Fruit Fly Circus School is the only primary and secondary-level circus school in Australia. It was founded in 1987 as the educational arm of The Flying Fruit Fly Circus.

The school was originally located on the grounds of Wodonga High School, but in 2003 a fire destroyed the entire Wodonga High School facility. Police considered the fire suspicious. The school was relocated to nearby Wodonga West Secondary College, now known as Wodonga Middle Years College Felltimber Campus due to a merging of the three public schools in Wodonga (Wodonga High School, Wodonga West Secondary College, and Mitchell Secondary College) in 2005–2006.

== See also ==
- Cirkidz
- National Institute of Circus Arts
- Lennon Bros Circus
- The Flying Fruit Fly Circus
