= Franklin Aigbirhio =

Nigerian-born British chemist

Professor Franklin Aigbirhio FRSC FMedSci
- Born: Franklin Imokhuede Aigbirhio; 2 January 1962 (age 64); Benin City, Nigeria
- Other name: Franklin Imo Aigbirhio
- Education: University of East Anglia; University of Sussex
- Known for: Radiochemistry, Positron Emission Tomography, Neuroimaging, Racial Equality Activities
- Scientific career
- Fields: Chemistry, Biomedical Imaging
- Institutions: University of Sheffield, MRC Cyclotron Unit, University of Cambridge
- Website: https://www.micl.wbic.cam.ac.uk/

Franklin Imo Aigbirhio, FRSC FMedSci is a Nigerian-born British chemist and academic specialising in biomedical imaging research. Since 2014 he has been the Professor of Molecular imaging Chemistry at the University of Cambridge.

== Early life and education ==
Aigbirhio was born in Benin City, Nigeria. He was educated at Heaton Comprehensive School in Newcastle upon Tyne. He graduated with a Bachelor Of Science degree in chemical sciences at the University of East Anglia in 1984. This was followed by a DPhil in physical organometallic chemistry from the University of Sussex in 1988 under the supervision of Colin Eaborn.

== Academic career ==
Aigbirhio began his academic career in 1988 with postdoctoral research at the University of Sheffield with Peter Maitlis. He then joined the MRC Cyclotron Unit in 1991, changing research focus to radiochemistry for biomedical imaging applications. With appointment as a Senior Research Associate he joined the Wolfson Brain Imaging Centre at the University of Cambridge in 1997 as a founding staff member. As the centre's Head of PET Chemistry, he established its chemistry programme and facility. This was followed by appointments as the centre's Director of PET Sciences (2006–19) and Co-Director (2017–18).

He was promoted to a university grade of Principal Research Associate in 2004, the first person to be appointed to this grade at the University of Cambridge. This was then followed by promotion to the Professor of Molecular Imaging Chemistry and Director of the Molecular Imaging Chemistry Laboratory at the Department of Clinical neurosciences, University of Cambridge in 2014. He became an affiliated professor at the Department of Chemistry, University of Cambridge in 2020.

He was elected a Senior Research Fellow of Magdalene College, Cambridge in 2020.

On a national level he has been Lead for the Dementias Platform UK Imaging Network (2014–2021) and has been the chair of the UK PET Innovation Network since 2019.

In 2022 he led the University of Cambridge's successful bid as part of the ANGLIA consortium with University College London and University of Sheffield to host a UKRI/MRC total body PET scanner to become part of the National PET Imaging Platform. Subsequently has become Director of the ANGLIA Total Body PET consortium.

== Research focus ==
Aigbirhio research is in the field of molecular imaging, with a focus on using the nuclear medicine technique of positron emission tomography (PET). His research consists of developing radiochemical methods and PET radiotracers which can be used for imaging and investigating disease mechanisms and, hence developing new treatments. His programme of research has included applying PET imaging to brain injury, stroke, neurodegenerative disorders and hypertension. In partnership with researchers from the University of Cambridge, Uppsala University and Queen Mary University of London he led a programme that developed the PET radiotracer [18F]CETO for the diagnosis of primary aldosteronism (PA), a treatable form of hypertension. This radiotracer is now being used for NHS clinical diagnostic PET imaging at Addenbrooke's Hospital, Cambridge, UK

== Diversity activities ==
On promotion to a personal Chair in 2014, he became the only black professor at the University of Cambridge and has been involved in many activities to increase diversity in higher education. As part of this he became Co-Chair of the University of Cambridge Racial Equality Network in 2020. He was Co-Chair of the MRC ‘Black in Biomedical Research’ Advisory Group (2022-2205) and Diversity Champion for the Academy of Medical Sciences (2022- 2025).

== Recognition ==
Aigbirhio is a Fellow of the Royal Society of Chemistry (FRSC) and was elected Fellow of the Academy of Medical Sciences (FMedSci) in 2021 and member of its governing council (2022–2025).
