= WIHW-LP =

- Dover, Delaware; United States
- Frequency: 96.1 MHz

Programming
- Format: Christian
- Affiliations: Fundamental Broadcasting Network

Ownership
- Owner: Capitol Baptist Church
- Sister stations: WOTJ

History
- First air date: 2005

Technical information
- Licensing authority: FCC
- Facility ID: 132040
- Class: L1
- ERP: 100 watts
- HAAT: 26 meters (85 feet)
- Transmitter coordinates: 39°08′08″N 75°32′24″W

Links
- Public license information: LMS
- Webcast: FBN and WIHW
- Website: http://www.cbcofdover.com/

WIHW-LP (96.1 FM) is a radio station licensed to serve Dover, Delaware. The station is owned by Capitol Baptist Church. It airs a Christian radio format featuring programming from the Fundamental Broadcasting Network.

Other programming on WIHW-LP includes the Revival Time Radio Broadcast hosted by Dr. Jack Trieber and Truth For Teens, a Christian ministry for troubled teens.

The station was assigned the WIHW-LP call letters by the Federal Communications Commission on April 10, 2004.
