= WPOG =

- St. Matthews, South Carolina; United States
- Frequency: 710 kHz

Programming
- Format: Christian talk and teaching, Southern Gospel
- Affiliations: Fundamental Broadcasting Network; SRN News

Ownership
- Owner: Grace Baptist Church of Orangeburg
- Sister stations: WWOS, WWOS-FM

History
- Call sign meaning: Worshipping the Prince Of Glory

Technical information
- Licensing authority: FCC
- Facility ID: 54577
- Class: D
- Power: 1,000 watts day
- Transmitter coordinates: 33°37′4″N 80°46′50″W

Links
- Public license information: Public file; LMS
- Webcast: Listen Live
- Website: wwosradio.net

WPOG (710 AM) is a radio station licensed to St. Matthews, South Carolina. It is owned and operated by Grace Baptist Church of Orangeburg. WPOG broadcasts a Christian talk and teaching radio format, along with Southern gospel music. The station's transmitter is off Radio Road in St. Matthews. The signal covers the region of South Carolina between Charleston and Columbia.

Because it shares the same frequency as clear-channel station WOR in New York City, WPOG is a daytimer, required to go off the air at night when radio waves travel farther. The station's programming is heard around the clock on co-owned WWOS-FM 91.9 in St. George, South Carolina. WPOG is also simulcast on AM 810 WWOS in Walterboro, South Carolina.

== History ==
On August 15, 1975, the station first signed on as WQKI. It was owned by the Central Carolina Broadcasting Corporation and aired a country music format.
