= WGHW =

- Lockwoods Folly Town, North Carolina; United States
- Broadcast area: Wilmington area
- Frequency: 88.1 MHz

Programming
- Format: Christian
- Affiliations: Fundamental Broadcasting Network

Ownership
- Owner: Peace Baptist Church of Wilmington, NC

History
- First air date: 2006

Technical information
- Licensing authority: FCC
- Facility ID: 89986
- Class: C1
- ERP: 52,000 watts
- HAAT: 110.4 meters (362 ft)
- Transmitter coordinates: 34°3′48.00″N 78°5′32.00″W

Links
- Public license information: Public file; LMS
- Website: peacebaptist.net

WGHW (88.1 FM) is a radio station licensed to Lockwoods Folly Town, North Carolina, United States, and serving the Wilmington area. The station airs a Christian format and is owned by Peace Baptist Church of Wilmington, North Carolina.

== History ==
WGHW was constructed in 2006 by Church Planters of America as one of several stations in its "Old Paths Radio Network". A 2016 license to cover earned the station a $3,000 fine from the FCC, for having installed the antenna at a different height than authorized.

Church Planters sold the station to Peace Baptist Church for $250,000 in January 2019; the sale was consummated on April 18, 2019. The church planned to program a full-service Christian format.
