= WHGT =

- Maugansville, Maryland; United States
- Broadcast area: Hagerstown metropolitan area
- Frequency: 1590 kHz
- Branding: WHGT Christian Radio

Programming
- Language: English
- Format: Christian radio
- Affiliations: Fundamental Broadcasting Network; SRN News

Ownership
- Owner: Emmanuel Baptist Temple; (WHGT Christian Radio, LLC)

History
- First air date: March 23, 1956
- Former call signs: WCBG (1956–2005)
- Call sign meaning: Where Hearts Get Transformed; alternate: Hagerstown

Technical information
- Licensing authority: FCC
- Facility ID: 39494
- Class: D
- Power: 15,000 watts (day); 58 watts (night)
- Transmitter coordinates: 39°48′23.3″N 77°46′44″W

Links
- Public license information: Public file; LMS
- Website: ebt.church/christian-radio

WHGT (1590 kHz) is a non-commercial Christian radio formatted broadcast AM radio station licensed to Maugansville, Maryland, serving the Hagerstown metropolitan area. WHGT is owned and operated by Emmanuel Baptist Temple in Hagerstown, Maryland.

== History ==
VerStandig Broadcasting, former owner of AM 1590, "donated" the station to Emmanuel Baptist Temple after a very public battle of the station's tower, which was in Chambersburg city limits. On January 1, WCBG switched calls with then sister WHGT and moved all programming to AM 1380 and AM 1590 fell silent. AM 1590 would remain silent until December 4, 2005, with FBN religious programming and operated by Emmanuel Baptist Temple. Upon acquiring land, WHGT moved its city of license to Maugansville, MD, several miles south of Chambersburg. As of August 2010, the two radio towers broadcast with a directional signal at 15,000 watts of power during the day, covering others cities such as Hagerstown, MD and Martinsburg, WV. Under ideal conditions, the signal goes as far north as northern Pennsylvania; faint remnants of the signal could be heard there when WGGO was silent, and the station's signal still occasionally overwhelms WGGO's during critical hours.
