= WOGM-LP =

- Jamestown, New York; United States
- Frequency: 104.7 MHz

Programming
- Format: Christian
- Affiliations: Fundamental Broadcasting Network

Ownership
- Owner: Lighthouse Baptist Church

Technical information
- Licensing authority: FCC
- Facility ID: 131804
- Class: L1
- ERP: 48 watts
- HAAT: 43 meters (141 ft)
- Transmitter coordinates: 42°05′12″N 79°12′53″W

Links
- Public license information: LMS
- Webcast: Listen live
- Website: Lighthouse Baptist Church; Fundamental Broadcasting Network

WOGM-LP is a low-powered FM radio station licensed to Jamestown, New York. The station broadcasts on 104.7 MHz and is licensed to, and operated by, the Lighthouse Baptist Church of Jamestown. As such, it carries a religious format from the Fundamental Broadcasting Network.

Prior to 2010, WOGM-LP had aired on 105.9 MHz. However, the establishment of WGWE (a full-power station in Little Valley whose signal covers the city of Jamestown) forced the station to go silent and find a new frequency.
