= WJSN-FM =

- Jackson, Kentucky; United States
- Frequency: 97.3 MHz
- Branding: The Country Cats

Programming
- Format: Country

Ownership
- Owner: Intermountain Broadcasting Co.
- Sister stations: WEKG

History
- First air date: January 1, 1978
- Call sign meaning: Jackson

Technical information
- Licensing authority: FCC
- Facility ID: 28905
- Class: C2
- ERP: 50,000 watts
- HAAT: 248 meters (814 ft)
- Transmitter coordinates: 37°40′19″N 83°24′21″W

Links
- Public license information: Public file; LMS

WJSN-FM (97.3 FM) is a radio station broadcasting a country music format. Licensed to Jackson, Kentucky, United States, the station is currently owned by Intermountain Broadcasting Co.
