= Jack Wilson (engineer) =

- Born: 16 May 1905; Batley, Yorkshire, England
- Died: 30 March 1972 (aged 66); Glen Waverley, Victoria, Australia
- Known for: Founder of Wilson Transformer Company
- Spouses: Dulcie Dorothy Ann Howard (m. 1939; div. 1946) Betty Evelyn Webster (m. 1946)

Jack Wilson (1905–1972) was an Australian engineer. The company he founded, Wilson Transformer Company, continues to manufacture electrical transformers in Australia.

== Early life ==
Wilson was born on 16 May 1905 at Batley, Yorkshire in England. After school at Purlwell Council and Batley Grammar Schools, he was apprenticed to Ward & Co, a local electrical and mechanical engineering firm. He went on to be a draftsman and designer with Yorkshire Electric Transformer Company.

In 1929, Wilson emigrated to Victoria, Australia and joined the Australian branch of the British Electric Transformer Co. in South Melbourne. Four years later, he launched his own business in 1933. It had several homes before settling at Port Melbourne in 1938 as the Wilson Electric Transformer Co. Pty Ltd.

== Wilson Transformer Company ==
Following World War II, in 1950 Wilson moved to a larger site at Glen Waverley in what was then an outer suburb surrounded by market gardens. He travelled frequently to England, New Zealand and Canada to keep abreast of new technology and forge relationships with international partners such as Ferranti. A second factory opened at Clovelly Park in Adelaide in 1963 to build distribution transformers. A factory opened at Wodonga in 1981.

Wilson Transformer Company is the largest Australian manufacturer of large transformers. The executive chairman is Jack Wilson's eldest son, Robert.

== Personal life ==
Wilson's first marriage was on 17 June 1939 at All Saints Church of England in Saint Kilda, to Dulcie Dorothy Ann Howard. They divorced in 1946. He remarried on 3 September 1946 to Betty Evelyn Webster at Collins Street Independent Church in Melbourne. They had two sons and a daughter.

During his first marriage, Wilson was commissioned as a lieutenant in the Australian Militia in December 1940, then transferred to the Australian Imperial Force on 7 August 1942 and promoted major in the Australian Army Ordnance Corps and transferred to the Australian Electrical and Mechanical Engineers. He served in the Middle East from May to December 1943 with the British 1st Armoured Division. He then performed staff and training duties in Australia before transferring to the Reserve of Officers on 20 June 1945.

Wilson served as a councillor (1954–1957) and president (1956–1957) of Mulgrave Shire. He also had leading roles in many industrial and educational schools. He supplied equipment and prizes to the Department of Electrical Engineering at Monash University, and is honoured by having the high voltage laboratory named after him.

Wilson's health declined from 1966, and he died of a coronary occlusion on 30 March 1972 at Glen Waverley.
