= WTYG =

Coordinates: 29°20′21″N 82°06′10″W

- Sparr, Florida; United States
- Frequency: 91.5 MHz

Programming
- Format: Christian radio
- Affiliations: Fundamental Broadcasting Network

Ownership
- Owner: Central Baptist Church of Ocala Inc.

Technical information
- Licensing authority: FCC
- Facility ID: 171562
- Class: A
- ERP: 100 watts
- HAAT: 29 meters (95 ft)
- Translator: 107.1 W296CW (Ocala)

Links
- Public license information: Public file; LMS
- Webcast: Listen live
- Website: wtygfm.org

WTYG is a Christian radio station licensed to Sparr, Florida, broadcasting on 91.5 FM. WTYG is owned by Central Baptist Church of Ocala Inc.

WTYG is also heard in Ocala, Florida at 107.1 through translator W296CW.

Broadcast translator for WTYG
| Call sign | Frequency | City of license | FID | ERP (W) | HAAT | Class | FCC info |
|---|---|---|---|---|---|---|---|
| W296CW | 107.1 FM | Ocala, Florida | 140570 | 120 | 35 m (115 ft) | D | LMS |
