= WEKG =

- Jackson, Kentucky; United States
- Frequency: 810 kHz

Programming
- Format: Country music
- Affiliations: ABC Radio

Ownership
- Owner: Intermountain Broadcasting Co., Inc.
- Sister stations: WJSN-FM

History
- First air date: April 6, 1969
- Call sign meaning: Walt Elliott Kenan Gordon

Technical information
- Licensing authority: FCC
- Facility ID: 28904
- Class: D
- Power: 5,000 watts day
- Transmitter coordinates: 37°34′41″N 83°24′19″W
- Translator: (94.1 MHz) W231DX (Jackson)

Links
- Public license information: Public file; LMS

WEKG (810 AM) is a radio station broadcasting a country music format. Licensed to Jackson, Kentucky, United States, the station is owned by Intermountain Broadcasting Co., Inc. and features programming from ABC Radio. 810 AM is a United States clear-channel frequency. KSFO and WGY are the Class A stations on 810 AM. WEKG must use a directional antenna at night to protect the Class A stations.
