= Performing arts education in Australia =

Performing arts education in Australia refers to the teaching of different styles of creative activity that are performed publicly. The performing arts in Australia encompasses many disciplines including music, dance, theatre, musical theatre, circus arts and more. Performing arts education in Australia occurs both formally and informally at all levels of education, including in schools, tertiary institutions and other specialist institutions. There is also a growing body of evidence, from the Australian Council for the Arts and the Parliament of Australia, showing that First Nation's participation in the arts and culture has significant economic, social and cultural benefits to Australia and further supports the outcomes of the Australian governments ‘Closing the Gap’ campaign. There has been an increasing number of scholarships opening up in educational institutions for Indigenous Australians aimed at encouraging this participation in the arts.

== History of performing arts education in Australia ==
The first Australian Educational Curriculum, drawn up in Victoria in 1872, was based on approximately 7 subjects, which were reading, writing, arithmetic, grammar, geography, drill, gymnastics as well as sewing and needlework for females. These were all skills or knowledge based subjects lacking creative and visual appeal. Therefore, in the early history of Australia, performing arts education was outsourced from schools and taught privately.

On 12 October 1924 Sir Bernard Heinze organised the first concert for children in Melbourne, which has been regarded as the first education project by an Australian performing arts organisation.

On 23 March 1974, the National Youth and Children's Performing Arts Association of Australia was created during the Adelaide Festival. The organisation was developed after the Australian Council for the Arts (ACA) formed a Youth Panel focused on improving the quality in performing arts for young individuals in 1972. Acting as a national organisation, the aims and objectives were outlined as follows:

1) To stimulate, promote and develop the performing and community arts by and for young people; 2) To encourage and co-ordinate the exchange of ideas and information between members, producing bodies, funding bodies, schools, colleges, universities and all interested persons through newsletters, journals, workshops and festivals; 3) To encourage and facilitate the exchange of personnel as widely as possible in the field.

In the following year, the organisation became a constituted body and rebranded as the Australian Youth Performing Arts Association (AYPAA). The association began to fulfil its role through organising the Children's Programme for the Australia 75 Festival of the Arts and Science held in Canberra in March 1975. Contributed generously by funding from the Schools Commission, the program was a comprehensive educational experiencing ranging from performances by youth theatre groups and theatre-in-education companies to drama camps.

The amount of activity occurring in the performing arts sector grew quickly in the 1970s, as indicated by the records of the 1977 Directory of Youth Performing arts in Australia. In Queensland, the youth and junior Little Theatre movement flourished, in addition to theatre-in-education groups initiated by La Boite, the Queensland Theatre Company, Twelfth Night Theatre, and the Education Department. By then, youth orchestras, choral music activities, and dance were prevalent in most states.

A lot of the changes that improved performing arts education in Australia can be attributed to an enquiry into the major performing arts entitled ‘Securing the Future’’ headed by Helen Nugent in 1999, which lead to significant changes most notably an increase in the amount of government support for the sector through the Australia Council and what was then the Department of Communications, Information Technology and the Arts.

=== Music ===
In the 60s and 70s, the main teaching method for music education in Australian classrooms was ‘exploration.’ Introduced by music educators Carl Orff, Emile Jaques Dalcroze, R. Murray Schafer, and George Self, the technique of ‘exploration’ was a means of engaging students in making new music and sounds. These were often combined with formal theory lessons, however it was deemed that this learning style was not effective in student's music learning.

Towards the late 80s, a new direction on music education teachings was implemented. Performance, composition, and listening and the interrelationship between the components became central to music programs. One of the main changes in practical music studies was from the use of Orff instruments and recorders to classroom instruments and vocal music. More common classroom instruments included keyboard, guitar, and percussion.

In the 80s, optional small group instrumental music programs were offered by State Departments of Education except for New South Wales (NSW). As for NSW and most independent schools across Australia, instrumental teachers were either classroom teachers or hired externally by the school for individual lessons. Bands, orchestras, and facilities to support associated activities such as music camp were offered by all states.

Certificated courses were revised by the late 80s to allow students’ interests and requirements to be met more easily. The Year 12 syllabus was revised by most states to offer at least two music subjects, such as Performance and Theory in South Australia. Performance is the most assessed component and was weighted upwards from 25%. Another change was the shift away from norm-based assessments used in 70s and early 80s to criteria-based assessments. The proportion of internal and external examination varied by state.

Outside the classroom, most states provided students the opportunity to experience touring performing arts and music programs of various styles. For example, Queensland's art council had an extensive music program that offered over 4000 performances a year for school audiences.

=== Dance ===
Before dance education was included in the Australian Curriculum, the Theatre Board of the Australia Council held a Dance Education Conference in 1974 to initially communicate the issues of performing arts companies and its connection to Australian education. From 12–15 August 1977, there was another conference with 240 people in attendance. Discussed in the conference were of the major issues facing dance education in Australia. These included:

- The articulation of dance to the broader community (professionals in the dance field)
- The experimental “fringe” associated with finding a new articulation of dance
- Education of dance teachers

Before 1991, dance educators in both public and private sectors had difficulty in categorically defining the framework of dance education. There was no unified teaching approach or facilities suitable for the dance like other arts subjects, such as visual arts, music, and drama. Some schools focused on performance and acquisition of technical skills of certain dance, while others taught mainly social forms of dance, which intended to provide students with the social skills they needed in the adult world. There were also very few courses that involved students to analyse, evaluate, and appreciate a dance work as students were not equipped with the skills and understanding to do so.

In a 1991 position paper, the Australian Association for Dance Education proposed a framework for dance studies in the P–12 curriculum, stating their purpose that:

Dance is part of the history of human movement, part of the history of human culture and part of the history of human communication. These three elements are brought together and realised through dance activity. Therefore, dance activity is an important factor in human social development (Gulbenkian Report 1981, p. 1).

The global framework proposed 3 key outcomes: making dance (composition), performance, and appreciation.

=== Drama ===
On 21 September 2015, the Australian Curriculum included The Arts for all students in the compulsory years of schooling under the new draft of the Foundation – Year 10 Australian Curriculum: The Art. Within this new published framework, drama is presented as one of the new arts subjects, along with dance and media arts. These were added to the traditional arts subjects of music and visual arts.

== Integration into education ==
Performing arts education in Australia includes a plethora of disciplines, the most common being theatre, dance, music, musical theatre and circus. Dance and music are disciplines that are studied specifically as subjects in school, whilst other disciplines require specialist training from other institutions.

At a school level the Australian Education Curriculum includes 3 distinct subjects (Dance, Drama and Music) which come under the umbrella of the performing arts. These subjects are incorporated into student's learning from Foundation to the end of primary school. Individual schools are left to decide how this should occur. Students are then able to experience one or more arts subjects in depth in the first two years of secondary school (years 7 & 8) and then will be able to choose to specialise in one or more arts subjects in years 9 and 10. Each subject focusses on its own unique practices and terminology. Music is an aurally based practice where students will not only perform but listen to and compose music in a range of different styles and traditions. The aim of the subject is to gather and use knowledge of musical practices and musicians in order to critically analyse music. In drama, students are educated in using body language, speech, gesture and space to express and portray themes in both fictional and non-fictional contexts. They also explore how to respond and analyse to the drama performances of others. Dance involves the expression of meaning through movement and is where students develop skills in choreography, performance and the appreciation of dance. The Australian Curriculum of these subjects emphasises the close relationship of making and responding in the arts, and views understanding performing arts practices as just as important as performing.

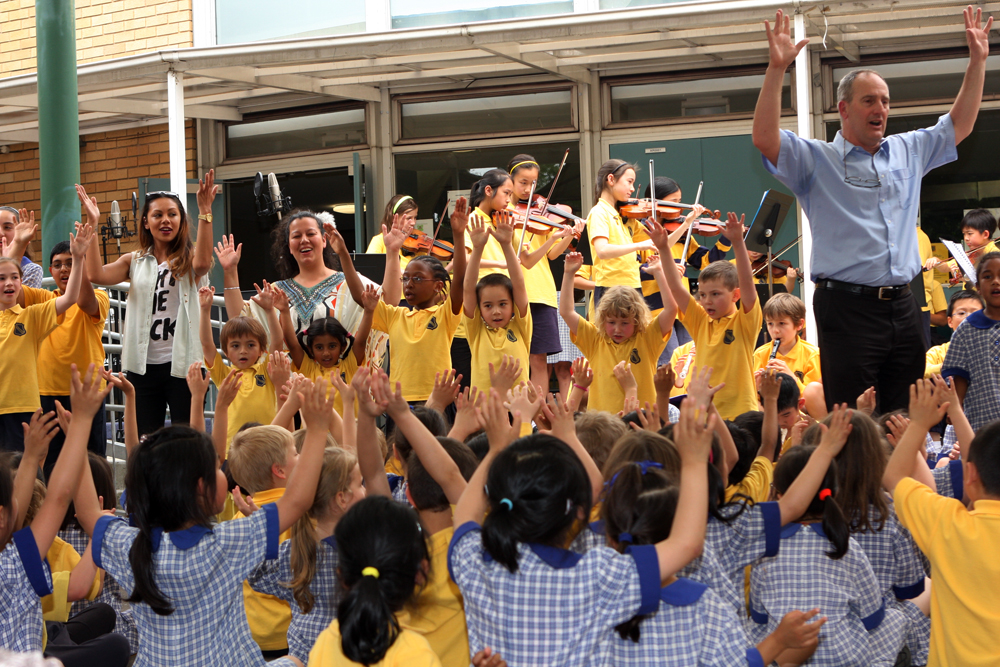
The Voice's Prinnie and Mahalia singing with 600,000 kids in Sydney at Haberfield Public School

The Australian Education Curriculum, notes that the complimentary partnership between the arts industry and the provision of the arts curriculum is integral in performing arts education. The industry provides opportunities for students to experience professional performances, demonstrations, artists in residence and gain access to performance facilities, as well as providing other services such as educational programs and teacher development. For example, the Australian School of Performing Arts (ASPA) are a prominent organisation for promoting performing arts education especially through their personal development programs for teachers. These programs help equip teachers with the knowledge, skills and resources to deliver exciting and meaningful performing arts programs in their schools.

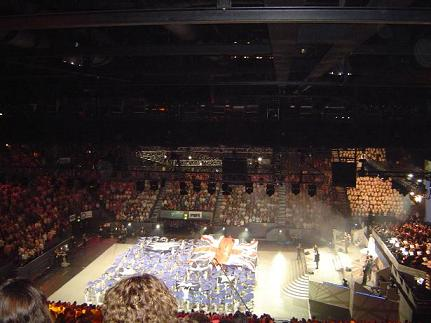
Schools Spectacular 2005; NSW.

New South Wales and Victoria are the only states in the country to have a funded department to support the arts. The ‘Arts Unit’ supported by the NSW State government provide statewide infrastructure and run programs for students inside and outside of school hours for all aspects of the arts. Each year over 44,000 students and 6,000 teachers are directly involved with programs run by the Arts Unit. The ‘Arts Unit’ also run the ‘Schools Spectacular’ annually, which is a performing arts show held at Qantas Credit Union Arena, to showcase the students talents from New South Wales public Schools. The show includes a cast of over 2300 dancers, a 2500-person combined choir, an 80-piece orchestra as well as a 25 piece stage band. The ‘Performing Arts Unit’ supported by the Victorian government helps give students of Victorian public schools the opportunity to participate in programs to do with dance, music, drama and visual arts. Over 20,000 students have been involved in educational experiences run by the Performing Arts Unit. Similarly to NSW, this unit also have a ‘Schools Spectacular’ showcase each year.

== Funding to providers ==
Performing arts in Australia is provided in schools, tertiary institutions as well as other specialist institutions. State governments are responsible for providing funding to both primary and secondary schools as well as community organisations that teach the performing arts. While tertiary institutions also do receive some funding from state governments, 2020 reforms by the federal government led the price of arts degrees, in particular creative arts, increasing by 13%.

=== The ARTS8 ===
The federal government provides funding support to the performing arts through the Office for the Arts. There are eight specific "national elite training organisations" which the government have funded for the past 30 years that aim to encourage "artistic and cultural excellence", making up the Australian Roundtable for Arts Training Excellence, or ARTS8. They are:

- Australian Ballet School:

The Australian Ballet school, located in Southbank Victoria, is the national centre for elite vocational classical dance. The school aims to train dancers of the highest calibre who will then be able to move into The Australian Ballet and other professional dance companies. Students are able to study in the after school or full time programs.

- Australian Film, Television and Radio School

The Australia Film television and Radio School (AFTRS) is a tertiary institution that provides several different courses in film and radio broadcasting. It is the only school in this sector in Australia to repeatedly make ‘The Hollywood Reporter's' list of the top film schools around the globe. It is located in the Entertainment Quarter in Sydney, New South Wales.

- Australian National Academy of Music

Australia National Academy of Music's (ANAM) aim is to train outstanding young classical musicians. They offer year long performance programs for solo, orchestral and chamber musicians. Students may reapply after completing their first year for two extra years of training. It is located in South Melbourne, Victoria.

- Australian Youth Orchestra

The Australian Youth Orchestra (AYO) offer musical development to the best young instrumentalists in Australia. They provide tailored training programs to younger emerging musicians all the way through to those wanting to pursue a professional career. Students can be anywhere between 12 and 30 years old. AYO is located out of Sydney, New South Wales.

- The Flying Fruit Fly Circus

The Flying Fruit Circus are the only education institution in the country to offer a full time circus training program. The Flying Fruit Circus are an annexe built onto Wodonga Middle Years College in South Albury, New South Wales, for circus students from grades 3 to 10. Students from grades 10 to 12, or tertiary student have the opportunity to complete a two-year course which will accredit them with a certificate III in circus arts. This program is run in partnership with the National Institute of Circus Arts, Swinburne University and Wodonga Secondary Senior College.

- NAISDA Dance College

The National Aboriginal Islander Skills Development Association (NAISDA) Dance College is a place of both learning and cultural connection for dance. The training includes guidance from professional dancers and choreographers. As of 2020 the college offers four accredited courses; Certification III, Certification IV, Diploma and Advanced Diploma of dance performance for Aboriginal and Torres Strait Islander Peoples. The college is located on Darkinjung land, which is north of Sydney, New South Wales.

- National Institute of Circus Arts

The National Institute of Circus Arts (NICA) is a non-for-profit training organisation for talented circus performers. Through NICA students are able to complete a three-year Bachelor of Circus Arts course. NICA also offer recreational community programs, and are located in Prahran, Victoria.

- National Institute of Dramatic Art

The National Institute of Dramatic Art is one of Australia's largest and most revered educational institutions that caters to multiple disciplines of the performing arts. NIDA offer undergraduate, graduate and diploma courses which allow students to specialise in areas such as writing for performance, technical theatre and stage management, acting, stage and screen performance and more.

=== Performing arts organisations as education providers ===
The threat of arts being marginalised in the school curriculum led to increasing pressure on performing arts organisations to be involved as education providers. This is articulated by Letts (1996) that a “classical music audience being fostered through schools is now in serious trouble. Performing arts organisations cannot afford to be passive in the quest to educate young audiences, indeed now more than ever they must share the responsibility equally with other providers of arts education.”

Notable Australian performing arts organisations that also act as education providers include the ABC Symphony Orchestra since 1924, and the Musica Viva In Schools program since 1981.

== Indigenous performing arts education ==
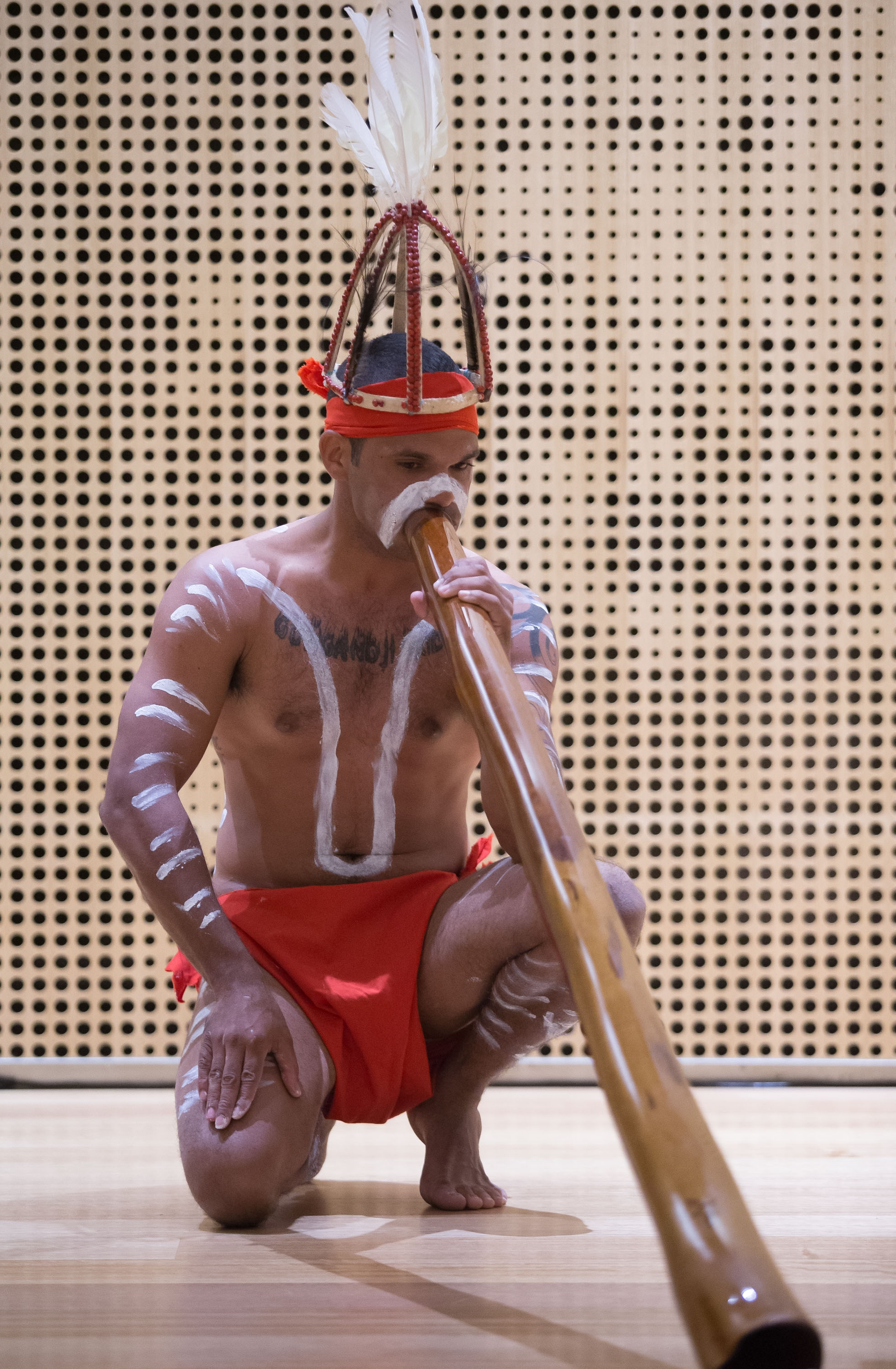
21 March 2016, Jakarta, Indonesia: Australian Indigenous navy members doing traditional dance at the opening of the new Australian Embassy in Jakarta.

Indigenous Australians have a rich and unique cultural and artistic expression which has a long deep rooted history. According to the Australia Council (OZCO) for the arts, performance in Indigenous cultures is about “expressing cultural belonging”. Performance is a part of several aspects of life in Indigenous culture including ceremony, celebration, storytelling, mourning and coming together to share events of Indigenous people's lives both past and present. In Indigenous culture performance encompasses acting, dancing, directing and dramaturgy. It is often a collaborative process and may integrate other visual art forms. It is through performance that Indigenous culture is transmitted and is seen a primary means of passing on laws and customs and sharing experiences as well as providing entertainment.

=== Indigenous performing arts education in the current Australian Curriculum ===
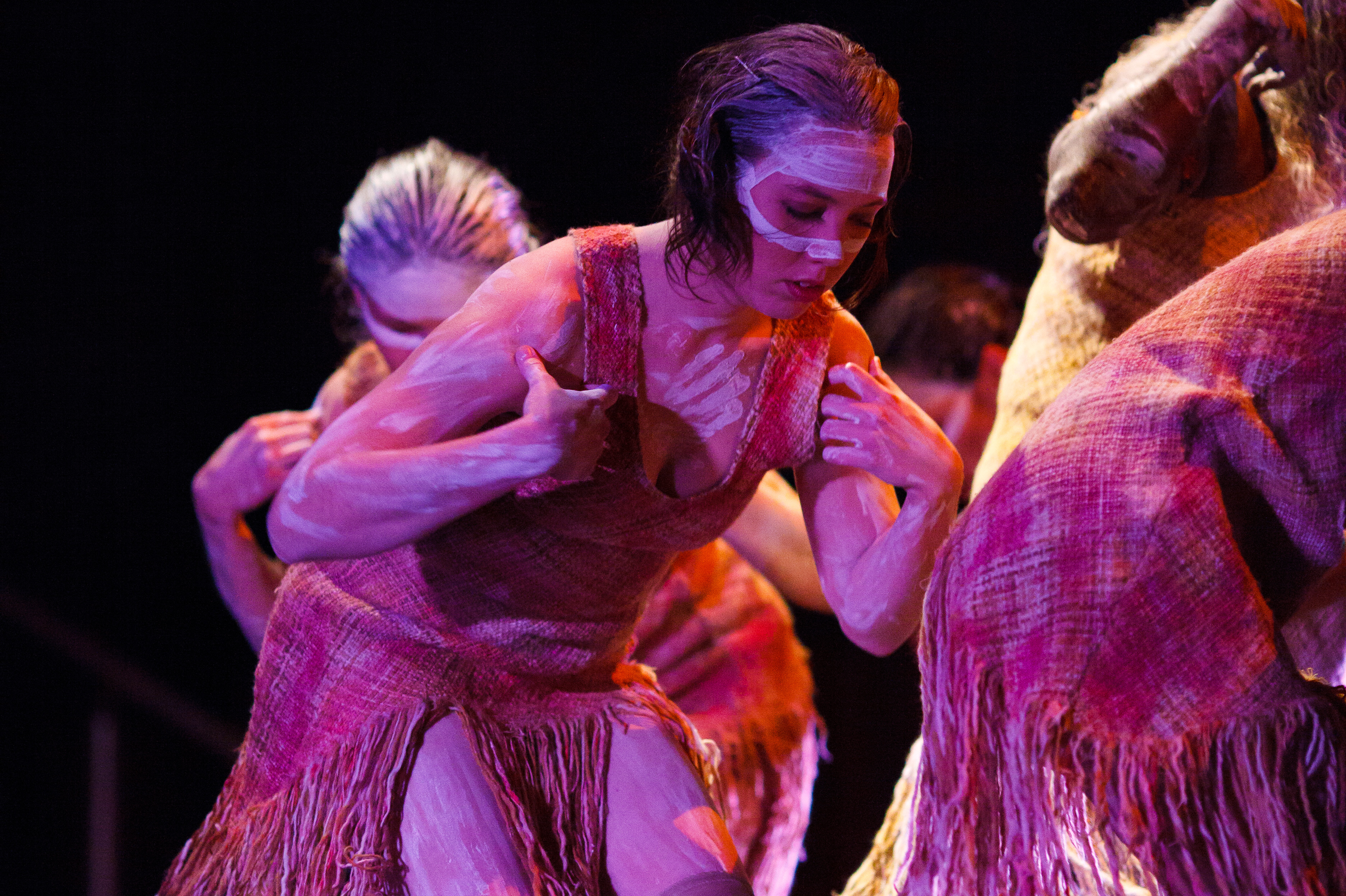
Bangarra Dance Theatre - at the Australian Human Rights Commission event

The Australia Council for the Arts (a government supported unit) have outlined protocols that should be considered and undertaken when educating about Indigenous culture. These protocols are aimed to endorse Indigenous cultural and intellectual property rights. They are based on themes of respect, Indigenous control, communication, consultation and consent as well as interpretation, integration and authenticity. Examples of such protocols in practice include knowing how to conduct an appropriate acknowledgement of country and understanding and researching the context and meaning of Indigenous language, songs, dances and symbols before interpreting or performing them. The protocols also heavily encourage consulting with Indigenous peoples and elders as much as possible when undertaking any performance or educational activity that involves Indigenous Australian culture.

Aboriginal and Torres Strait music studies is offered to students in Stage 4 (Year 7–8) and is mainly led by local/regional Aboriginal Education Consultative Groups (ACEG) and Aboriginal Elders. Students learn the characteristics of both traditional and contemporary Aboriginal music and how they co-exist in modern society. The first key outcome assessed is “performance”, where students learn, understand, and develop skills through performing in a range of musical styles and group sizes. An example assessment can include a performance of a song by a contemporary Aboriginal performance. The second key outcome is “composition”, in which students explore, experiment, and improvise with different notation and forms of technology in the composition process. The last key outcome is “listening”, where students extend their aural awareness and Aboriginal musical literacy.

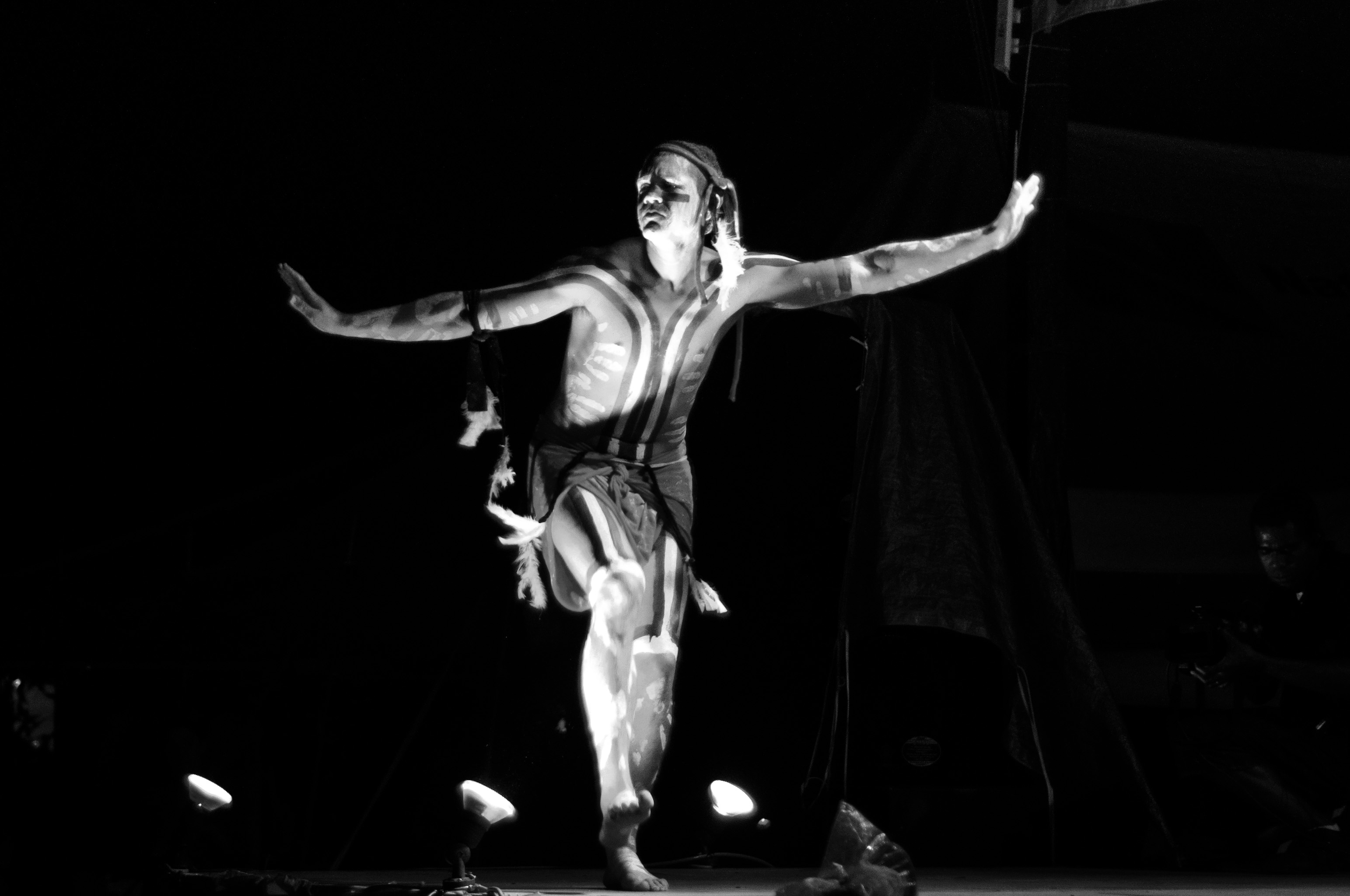
Aboriginal Dancing

The history and development of Aboriginal dance style and meaning throughout time is taught to students in Stage 4 and 5 (Year 7–10). Traditional Aboriginal dance studies include analysing how culture, language, and tradition is preserved in the Aboriginal crane dance and Aboriginal dream time war dance. This is contrasted with studies about contemporary Aboriginal Dance, particularly by the Bangarra Dance Theatre, to highlight the shift in expression of Aboriginal culture in modern society. Students are also assessed on performing both traditional and contemporary Aboriginal dance.

The subject on playbuilding with Aboriginal Pedagogies is available for students studying Stage 5 (Year 11–12) Drama. The course is intended to draw on Aboriginal Pedagogies as a core framework for the playbuilding process. The first key outcome assessed is “making”, where students learn to explore, develop, and structure ideas in playbuilding using dramatic forms, performance styles, dramatic techniques, theatrical conventions and technologies. The second and third key outcomes are “performing” and “appreciating” the process of playbuilding respectively. Teachers are expected refer to the ‘8 Ways’ Aboriginal Pedagogies image as students learn in order to value the connections between Aboriginal ways of learning and thinking to the playbuilding process.

=== Performing arts organisations as education providers ===
Some notable organisations that currently offer performing arts education specific to the culture of Indigenous Australians include the Aboriginal Centre for the Performing Arts, NAISDA Dance College, Blak Dance, Western Australian Academy of Performing Arts, and the Aboriginal Dance Theatre Redfern.

The Aboriginal Centre for the Performing Arts, run out of the Judith Wright Arts Centre in Brisbane, Queensland, is the only educational organisation that offers all disciplines of the performing arts focussing on Indigenous Australian culture. All Indigenous-identified schools in Australia are run on the principles of self-determination and self-management with Indigenous culture, history and values at their core.

== Notable performing arts educators ==
=== Sir Bernard Thomas Heinze ===
Born on 1 July 1894, Sir Bernard Thomas Heinze was most known as an Australian conductor and the Director of the New South Wales Conservatorium of Music. He was regarded as a pioneer in the industry as he saw the advantages of performing arts organisations providing educational products. Inspired by the successes of orchestral concerts for children in New York, Heinze developed the first Australian concert for children in Melbourne on 12 October 1924.

=== Dame Peggy van Praagh ===
Born on 1 September 1910, Dame Peggy van Praagh was best known as a British ballet dancer and an advocate for dance education in Australia later in her career. With the help of Bernard James of the University of New England, Van Praagh founded several dance summer schools that were influential to shaping Australia's approach on dance education. She also assisted in forming the advocacy body, Ausdance (formerly Australian Association for Dance Education). Van Praagh became the coordinator of dance studies at the Western Australian Academy of Performing Arts, Edith Cowan University, Perth in 1982.

=== Shirley McKechnie ===
Born in 1926, Shirley McKechnie is regarded as an Australian pioneer of contemporary dance in her dancing, choreographing, directing, and educating activities. In 1945, McKechnie founded her first dance school with the support of the Ferntree Gully Arts Society. She opened a second school in Beaumaris, Melbourne in 1955, which became the foundation for her career as a teacher, choreographer, and dance director. In 1963, McKechnie established the Australian Contemporary Dance Theatre, where she was the director and main choreographer for its first 10 years. After graduating from Monash University, McKechnie created and coordinated the first degree course in dance studies at an Australian tertiary institution, which was offered at Rusden College (now Deakin University) in 1975. As an advocate for dance education, McKechnie co-founded the Australian Association for Dance Education (now Ausdance) with other notable educators such as Dame Peggy Van Praagh. She also founded the Tertiary Dance Council of Australia and the Green Mill Dance Project.

== List of providers ==
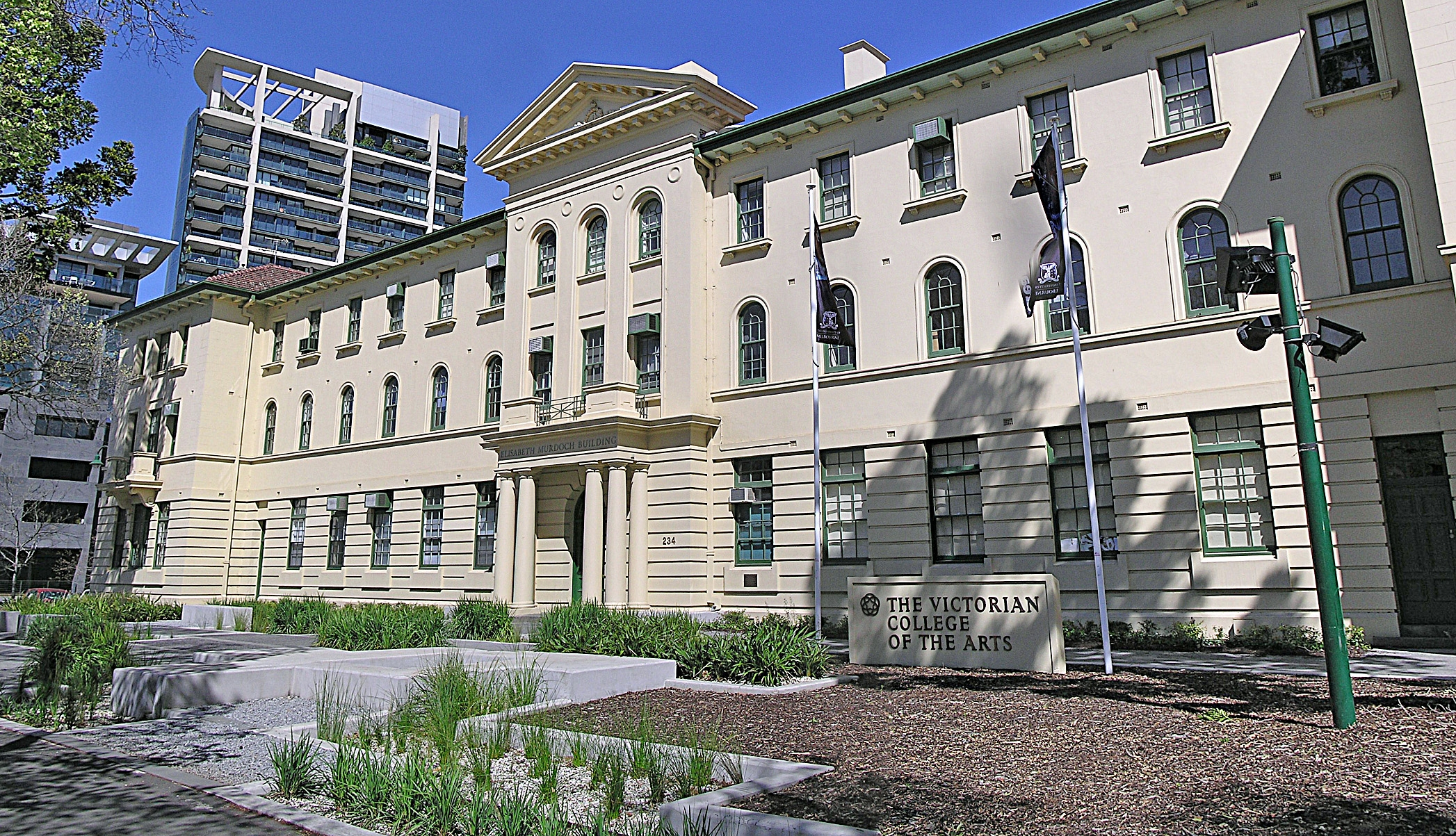
The Victorian College of the Arts

=== Specialist performing arts education in primary schooling ===
- Hunter School of the Performing Arts
- The McDonald College

=== Specialist performing arts education in secondary schooling ===
- Australian Performing Arts Grammar School
- Campbelltown Performing Arts High School
- Conservatorium High School
- Granville South Creative and Performing Arts High School
- Ku-ring-gai Creative Arts High School
- Nepean Creative and Performing Arts High School
- Newtown High School of the Performing Arts
- Northmead Creative and Performing Arts High School
- The McDonald College
- Wollongong High School of the Performing Arts
- Victorian College of the Arts Secondary School

New South Wales is the only state to have selective high schools specifically dedicated to the performing arts. NSW has 9 government, and 4 non-government selective schools for students who wish to excel in this sector.

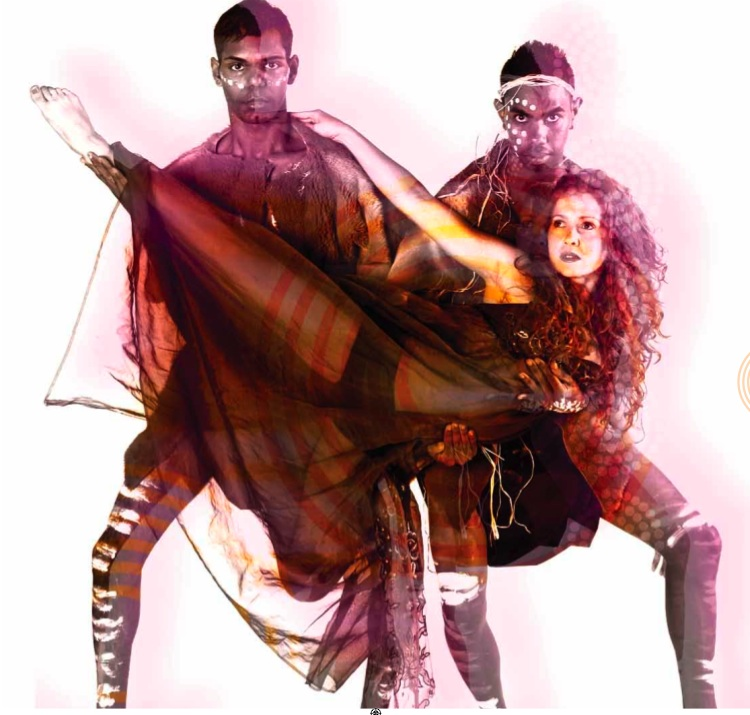
2012 production by the Aboriginal Centre for the Performing Arts

=== Specialist performing arts education in tertiary schooling ===
- Aboriginal Centre for the Performing Arts
- Academy of Film, Theatre & Television
- Academy of Music and Performing Arts
- Actors Centre Australia
- Adelaide College of the Arts
- Australian Ballet School
- Australian Dance Institute
- Australian Institute of Music
- Australian National Academy of Music – Dramatic Arts
- Australian Performing Arts Conservatory
- Bangarra Dance Theatre
- Box Hill Institute
- Excelsia College
- National Aboriginal Islander Skills Development Association
- National Institute of Circus Arts
- National Institute of Dramatic Art
- Victorian College of the Arts
- Western Australian Academy of Performing Arts

== See also ==
- Australian Elizabethan Theatre Trust
- New South Wales
  - List of creative and performing arts high schools in New South Wales
  - International Screen Academy, Sydney
- South Australia
  - Helpmann Academy
- Western Australia
  - UWA Conservatorium of Music
  - Western Australian Academy of Performing Arts
- Tasmania
  - Tasmanian Conservatorium of Music
- Victoria
  - Australian Institute of Music
