= WYTJ =

Coordinates: 39.100°N 87.183°W

- Linton, Indiana; United States
- Frequency: 89.3 MHz

Programming
- Format: Christian radio
- Affiliations: Fundamental Broadcasting Network

Ownership
- Owner: Bethel Baptist Church

History
- First air date: July 29, 2003
- Call sign meaning: Will You Trust Jesus

Technical information
- Licensing authority: FCC
- Facility ID: 91863
- Class: A
- ERP: 1,430 watts
- HAAT: 78 meters (256 ft)

Links
- Public license information: Public file; LMS
- Website: wytjradio.com

WYTJ is a non-commercial and non-profit Christian music radio station licensed to Linton, IN. It is owned by Bethel Baptist Church. WYTJ broadcasts at a frequency of 89.3 MHz with 1,430 watts of power using a non-directional antenna pattern. The Federal Communications Commission considers WYTJ to be a class A FM broadcasting facility. WYTJ stands for "Will You Trust Jesus?". WYTJ is also heard in Vincennes, Indiana through a translator, W201BO, broadcasting on 88.1 FM. In 2021, Bethel Baptist Church purchased 88.9 WVWG in Seelyville, Indiana for $35,000, and it began simulcasting WYTJ.

== History ==
- Station goes on the air, July 29, 2003.
- New transmitter installed, August 19, 2010.
- Station increases power by 400 watts, December 11, 2013.

== Simulcast ==
Call sign	Frequency	City of license	FID	ERP (W)	HAAT	Class	FCC info
WVWG	88.9 FM	Seelyville, Indiana	173133	1,250	66 m (217 ft)	A	LMS
