= The Flying Fruit Fly Circus =

Australian circus and circus school

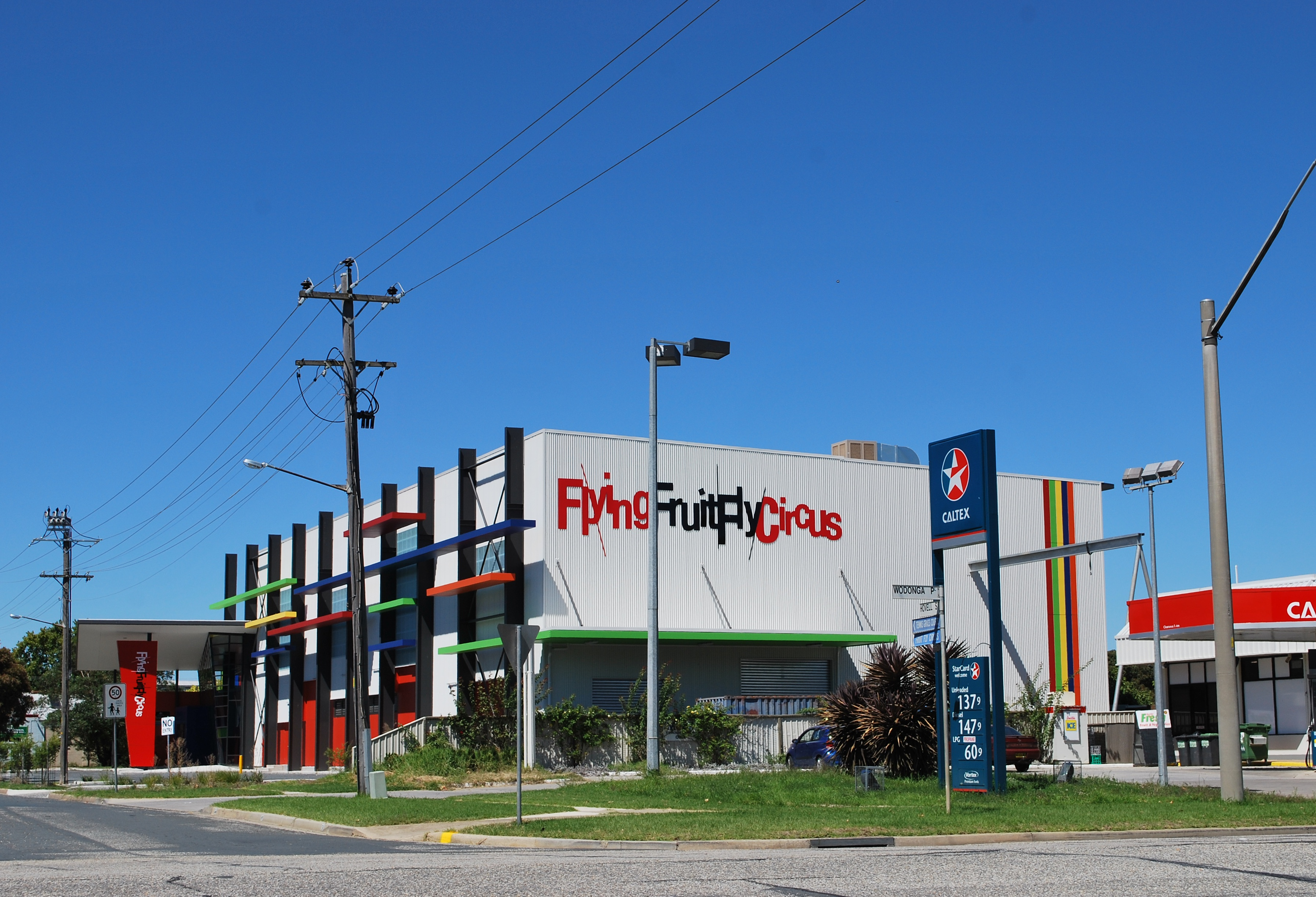
Flying Fruit Fly Circus, Albury, 2011

The Flying Fruit Fly Circus is Australia's national youth circus, and the only full-time circus school for young people in Australia.

== History ==
The Flying Fruit Fly Circus was one of the productions of the Murray River Performing Group, initially an ensemble of nine artists, set up mostly by graduates the Victorian College of the Arts Drama School, including Robert "Bomber" Perrier, the first artistic director, Lloyd Suttor, Mark Shirrefs and Ian Mortimer. The group began full-time operations in 1979, the International Year of the Child. Within four months the group had conducted workshops and performed in over forty venues, written two shows, organised 171 circus training sessions and produced the first Flying Fruit Fly Circus event involving 117 performers.

The second annual Flying Fruit Fly Circus event, in 1980, was seen by Chris Brookes, a Canadian playwright who visited at the suggestion of the Community Arts Board of the Australia Council. He suggested taking the Circus to the Vancouver Children's Festival in 1981.

Tanya Lester won a Gold Medallion in Le Cirque de Demain Competition in Paris. In 1982 she was the recipient of the Young Australian of the Year title.

In 1982 the Nanjing Acrobatic Troupe of China undertook a training project in Albury-Wodonga with Flying Fruit Fly Circus performers, Circus Oz and other physical theatre artists. The outcome was the show The Great Leap Forward.

In 1984 on behalf of the company, Perrier won the BHP Pursuit of Excellence Award in Arts and Literature.

In 1989–90 Flying Fruit Fly Circus represented Australia at Australia Week in Veneto, Italy and were awarded the Ros Bower Award for Outstanding Contribution to Community Arts.

In 1993 a sell-out season of Red Alert for the Sydney Festival (and half-time entertainment for the World Series Cricket) was followed by tours to Brisbane, Gippsland and Melbourne. In 1997 the Flying Fruit Fly Circus performed at the Melbourne Summer Live concert, the Fashion Spectacular and Moomba. In 1999 the Circus Festival transferred its main operations from Tasmania to Albury-Wodonga.

In 2004, the troupe performed Skipping on Stars, a tribute to the life of Con Colleano, a famous tightrope walker from Lismore, New South Wales.

In 2009, Flying Fruit Fly Circus performed The Promise at the Sydney Festival and Albury for its 30 year anniversary. Federal Minister Peter Garrett announced $3.75m government contribution to redevelop Flying Fruit Fly Circus training space.

In 2010 a major touring exhibition Step Right Up! The Circus in Australian Art developed through a partnership between Albury City and the Flying Fruit Fly Circus toured nationally from early 2010 through to January 2011 at venues including Mosman Art Gallery, Horsham Art Gallery, Port Pirie Regional Art Gallery, Bunbury Regional Art Gallery and Lake Macquarie City Art Gallery. The exhibition featured paintings, drawings, photographs, sketchbooks, prints and sculptures by various Australian artists.

In 2015 it became a company in residence at the Sydney Opera House with a three-year partnership and established a collaboration with the Vietnam School of Circus Arts and Vaudeville in Hanoi. It also travelled to Turkey for a two-week engagement in Istanbul as part of the Australia in Turkey Festival.

== Description ==
The Flying Fruit Fly Circus is located on the Murray River in the twin cities of Albury-Wodonga on the Victoria/New South Wales border. In partnership with the Victorian Department of Education, the students in years 3–9 attend the selective entry Flying Fruit Fly Circus School where they undertake academic studies along with circus training. It is the only full-time circus school people aged between 8 and 19 years old in Australia.

The Flying Fruit Fly Circus regularly performs in Australia and internationally at major arts centres, regional theatres, corporate events and festivals.

It is one of eight "national elite training organisations" of the "Australian Roundtable for Arts Training Excellence" (ARTS8), partially funded by the Australian Government via the Office for the Arts.

== Awards and nominations ==
- 1989: Winner, Mo Award for Circus Performer of the Year
- 2009: Helpmann Award for Best Presentation for Children (The Promise)
- 2014: Sydney Theatre Award nomination for Best Production for Children (Circus Under My Bed)
- 2018: Sydney Theatre Award for Best Production for Children (JUNK)

== See also ==
- Cirkidz
- Flying Fruit Fly Circus School
