= XERSV-AM =

Radio station in Ciudad Obregón, Sonora

Currently silent
- Ciudad Obregón, Sonora; Mexico
- Frequency: 810 kHz
- Branding: Tribuna Radio

Programming
- Format: News/talk

Ownership
- Owner: Empresas Editoriales del Noroeste, S.A. de C.V.

History
- First air date: July 7, 1967

Technical information
- Power: 5,000 watts (daytime only)

Links
- Website: tribunaradio.com.mx

XERSV-AM was a radio station on 810 AM in Ciudad Obregón, Sonora. It was known as Tribuna Radio after the newspaper of the same name.

== History ==
XERSV received its concession on July 7, 1967. It was owned by Luis Salcido Flores and sold to the newspaper in 1970.

The station folded in August 2019 due to economic reasons. By November 2020, unionized station employees had still not been paid their required severance.
