= Fundamental Broadcasting Network =

Christian radio network in the United States

- Type: Radio network
- Country: United States

Ownership
- Owner: Grace Baptist Church

History
- Launch date: December 12, 1988

Links
- Webcast: Listen Live
- Website: fbnradio.com

The Fundamental Broadcasting Network (FBN) is a network of Conservative Christian radio stations in the United States, based at the Grace Baptist Church in Newport, North Carolina.

Programs heard on FBN include Family Altar with Lester Roloff, Scripture Reading with Alexander Scourby, Gospel Hour with Oliver B. Greene, Ranger Bill, along with other Christian programming. Its music is predominantly traditionalist in nature, consisting mostly of hymns and some older Southern gospel, with no contemporary Christian music.

== Stations ==
FBN programming is featured on six full-powered stations and 11 translators, as well as 26 additional affiliated stations and translators, most of which are owned and operated by independent Baptist churches, which carry Fundamental Broadcasting Network's programming either in-part or in-whole. FBN's flagship station is WOTJ 90.7 FM in Newport, North Carolina, which began broadcasting December 12, 1988.

The Fundamental Broadcasting Network formerly operated two 50,000-watt shortwave stations, WTJC, which began broadcasting in 1999, and WBOH, which began broadcasting in 2002. WBOH ceased broadcasting in 2010.

=== Owned-and-operated stations ===
Call sign	Frequency	City of license	FID	ERP (W)	HAAT	FCC info
WRJS	88.1 FM	Soperton, Georgia	174547	12,000	82.2 m (270 ft)	LMS
WWFJ	88.1 FM	East Fayetteville, North Carolina	176574	2,000	25.3 m (83 ft)	LMS
WOTJ	90.7 FM	Morehead City, North Carolina	24709	24,000	142 m (466 ft)	LMS
WYBJ	90.7 FM	Newton Grove, North Carolina	85072	2,900	66 m (217 ft)	LMS
WFIC	1530 FM	Collinsville, Virginia	59418	1,000 day 250 critical hours	0 m (0 ft)	LMS
WMLJ	90.5 FM	Summersville, West Virginia	24722	11,000	315 m (1,033 ft)	LMS

=== Translators ===
Call sign	Frequency	City of license	FID	ERP (W)	Class	FCC info
W204CL	88.7 FM	Lexington Park, Maryland	92130	55	D	LMS
W204BA	88.7 FM	Oakland, Maryland	88144	250	D	LMS
W220BW	91.9 FM	Ayden, North Carolina	87070	250	D	LMS
W208AO	89.5 FM	Bell Arthur, North Carolina	85714	70	D	LMS
W214CB	90.7 FM	Edenton, North Carolina	122745	45	D	LMS
W214BU	90.7 FM	Elizabeth City, North Carolina	122756	45	D	LMS
W216BH	91.1 FM	Henderson, North Carolina	91388	55	D	LMS
W201DI	88.1 FM	Monroe, North Carolina	122755	170	D	LMS
W276AX	103.1 FM	Princeton, North Carolina	24710	120	D	LMS
W209BH	89.7 FM	Bernardstown, West Virginia	92135	10	D	LMS
W244BF	96.7 FM	Nimitz, West Virginia	87068	10	D	LMS

=== Affiliates ===
Call sign	Frequency	City of license	FID	FCC info
KTEH-LP	98.9 FM	Los Molinos, California	196151	LMS
WJYC-LP	105.3 FM	Terryville, Connecticut	196980	LMS
WIHW-LP	96.1 FM	Dover, Delaware	132040	LMS
WTYG	91.5 FM	Sparr, Florida	171562	LMS
WEYY	88.7 FM	Tallapoosa, Georgia	169466	LMS
KSBF	88.9 FM	Bonners Ferry, Idaho	767099	LMS
WYTJ	89.3 FM	Linton, Indiana	91863	LMS
WVWG	88.9 FM	Seelyville, Indiana	173133	LMS
WHGT	1590 FM	Maugansville, Maryland	39494	LMS
KFGL	88.1 FM	Butte, Montana	767055	LMS
WOGM-LP	104.7 FM	Jamestown, New York	131804	LMS
WHPY	1590 FM	Clayton, North Carolina	30615	LMS
WGHW	88.1 FM	Lockwoods Folly Town, North Carolina	89986	LMS
WBIC-LP	97.3 FM	Wilson, North Carolina	191641	LMS
WPIP	880 FM	Winston-Salem, North Carolina	41508	LMS
WBTB-LP	107.9 FM	Erie, Pennsylvania	192324	LMS
WPOG	710 FM	St. Matthews, South Carolina	132312	LMS
WWOS-FM	91.9 FM	St. George, South Carolina	54577	LMS
WSSC	1340 FM	Sumter, South Carolina	171479	LMS
WWOS	810 FM	Walterboro, South Carolina	39621	LMS
WSDC	88.5 FM	Sneedville, Tennessee	38899	LMS
WOTC	88.3 FM	Edinburg, Virginia	90783	LMS
KFCB-LP	105.1 FM	Douglas, Wyoming	69673	LMS

==== Translators ====
Call sign	Frequency	City of license	FID	ERP (W)	Class	FCC info
W296CW	107.1 FM	Ocala, Florida	140570	120	D	LMS
W201BO	88.1 FM	Vincennes, Indiana	83658	13	D	LMS
W234AH	94.7 FM	Harrisonburg, Virginia	82407	10	D	LMS
