= Wodonga High School =

Defunct school in Victoria, Australia

Information
- Motto: Labora ut Servias (Work to Serve)
- Established: 1955
- Closed: 2006
- Grades: Year 7 - Year 12

Wodonga High School was one of three public secondary schools educating Years 7−12 in Wodonga, Victoria, Australia. It was founded in 1955, and celebrated its 50th anniversary in 2005 under principal, Peter McLean.

In 2005−2006 it formally merged and pooled resources with the other two public secondary schools in Wodonga, Wodonga West Secondary College and Mitchell Secondary College. As of 2006, the former Wodonga High School facility is a specialist senior school for Years 10, 11 and 12, known as Wodonga Senior Secondary College, loosely associated with Wodonga Middle Years College.

== Motto ==
The school's motto was "Labora ut Servias", which roughly translates to "Work to Serve".

== Website ==
Wodonga High School's website was http://www.wodonga.vic.edu.au, but this address has been converted to serve Wodonga Senior Secondary College.

== Notable alumni ==
- Mary-Anne Thomas – Minister for Agriculture and Regional Development in the Victorian government.
- Jack Ziebell – AFL Footballer
