= Wodonga Middle Years College =

Public school in Victoria, Australia

Coordinates: 36°07′50″S 146°53′26″E

Information
- Motto: Every Student, Every Opportunity, Success for All
- Established: 2005; 21 years ago
- Years: 7-9

Wodonga Middle Years College is a public school in Wodonga, Victoria, Australia. It is a single college consisting of two campuses, Felltimber and Huon, based on the grounds and facilities of the former Wodonga West Secondary College and Mitchell Secondary College. The school's motto is "Every Student, Every Opportunity, Success for All."

== History ==
The college was formed in 2005–2006 when the three public schools in Wodonga – Wodonga High School, Wodonga West Secondary College, and Mitchell Secondary College – merged and pooled resources, as part of a plan to address long-term population growth in Wodonga. The plan saw the restructure of the public schools in Wodonga, with the formation of Wodonga Middle Years College to specialise in the education of students in Years 7, 8 and 9, and Wodonga Senior Secondary College to specialise in the education of Years 10, 11 and 12. The two colleges are loosely associated.

== Programs ==
Wodonga Middle Years College has two main programs catering for students in years 7, 8 and 9. All students in year 7 take part in the Authentic Learning program, designed to ease the transition from primary to high school. Students in years 8 and 9 undertake the Individual Learning Programs, where they choose their own subjects within certain guidelines.
