= Cirkidz =

Australian youth circus school

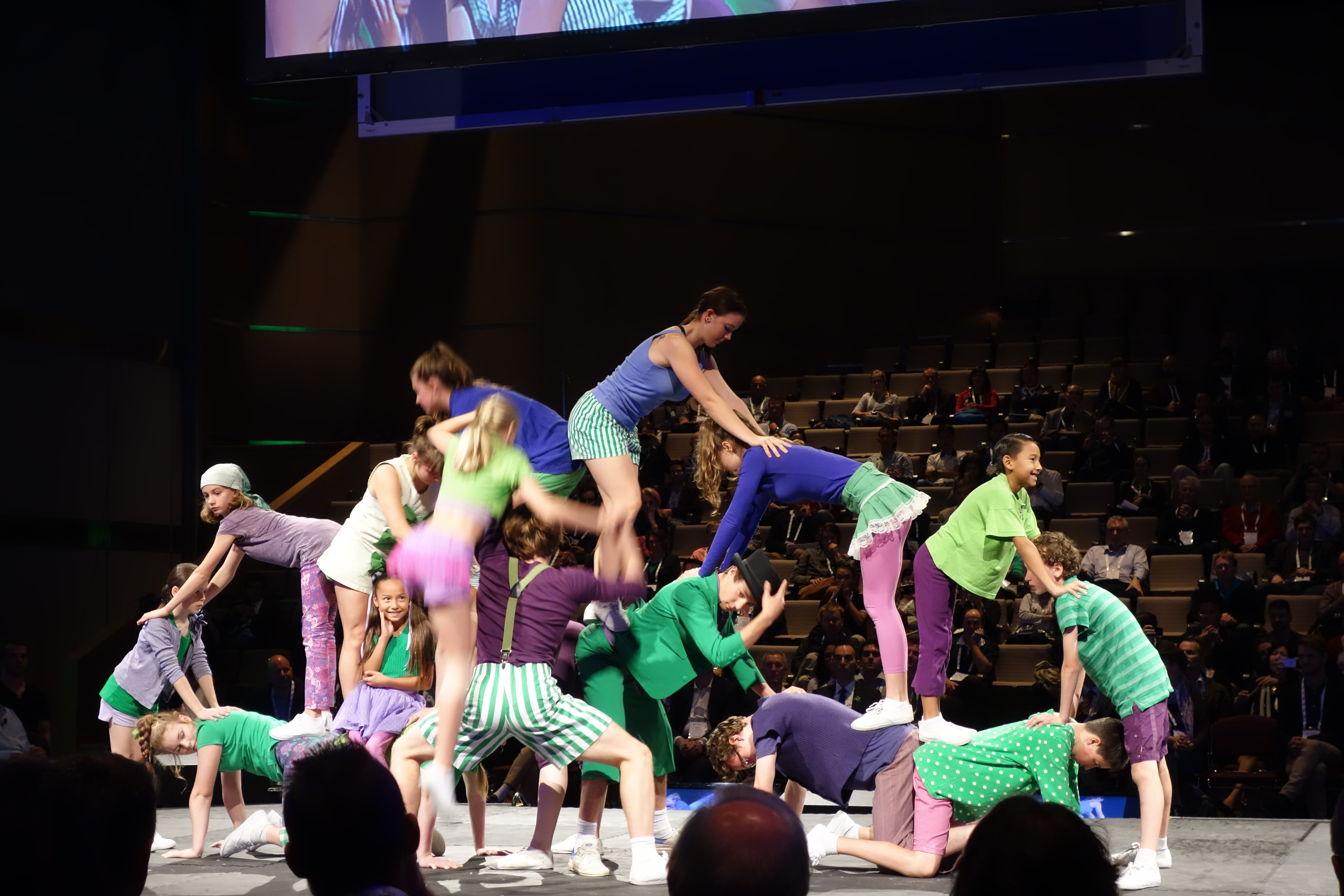
Cirkidz performing at the Velo-city 2014 conference

Cirkidz is a youth circus school based in Bowden, Adelaide.

It was founded by Tony Hannan and Michael Lester in 1985, as a workshop project.

== Performances ==
The Performance Troupe are Cirkidz participants, and create artistic work in the form of theatre performances. They are regularly booked to perform at a range of iconic South Australian events, including: the Adelaide Fringe Parade, the Credit Union Christmas Pageant, the Tour Down Under and Velo-city. The Performance Troupe also have annual productions for the general viewing public. In 2009, they performed 'Freaky', a sold out co-production with Circus Monoxide as part of 2009 Come Out Youth Arts Festival. With an extensive production history, Cirkidz' most recent production was 'Nest' in 2013, in association with several local emerging visual and audio artists. The Performance Troupe's creative output is under the direction and guidance of Cirkidz' Artistic Director. Cirkidz' Artistic Director is Joshua Hoare.

It has continued to perform since formation.

== See also ==
- Flying Fruit Fly Circus School
- National Institute of Circus Arts
