= Wodonga Senior Secondary College =

Location
- 80 Brockley St; Wodonga, Victoria, 3690; Australia; 36°07′34″S 146°52′49″E

Information
- Type: State, secondary, co-ed
- Motto: Every student, every opportunity, success for all
- Established: 2005–2006
- Acting Principal: Vern Hilditch
- Years offered: 10–12
- Colours: Blue and black

Wodonga Senior Secondary College is a public school in Wodonga, Victoria. It was formed in 2005–2006 when the three public schools in Wodonga – Wodonga High School, Wodonga West Secondary College, and Mitchell Secondary College – merged and pooled resources, as part of a plan to address long-term population growth in the area. The plan saw the restructure of the public schools in Wodonga, with the formation of Wodonga Middle Years College to specialise in the education of students in Years 7, 8 and 9, and Wodonga Senior Secondary College to specialise in the education of Years 10, 11 and 12. The two colleges are loosely associated.

Wodonga Senior Secondary College is based on the grounds and facilities of the former Wodonga High School. The new campus has many facilities, a new technology centre, arts wing and performing arts centre.
