= Wolfson Brain Imaging Centre =

Research centre of the University of Cambridge

Coordinates: 52.1744°N 0.1421°E

The Wolfson Brain Imaging Centre (WBIC) is a UK Biomedical Imaging Centre, located at Addenbrooke's Hospital, Cambridge, England, on the Cambridge Bio-Medical Campus at the southwestern end of Hills Road. It is a division of the Department of Clinical Neurosciences of the University of Cambridge.

The Centre opened in 1996 with a GE PET scanner, followed soon after by a Bruker 3T MRI system. After a major programme of infrastructure investment and redevelopment, funded by the Medical Research Council and the University of Cambridge. The facilities now comprise a Siemens 7T Terra MRI scanner, a Siemens 3T PrismaFit scanner, a Siemens 3T SkyraFit scanner, a GE 3T PET/MR Signa scanner and a hyper-polariser system.

Research conducted within the Centre falls broadly into the categorisations of positron emission tomography, magnetic resonance and radiochemistry. It also provides research platforms for neuroscience themes, including dementia, stroke and neurosurgery as well as cognitive neuroscience.

== People ==
- Prof Ed Bullmore – Chairman and Clinical Director
- Prof Franklin I. Aigbirhio – Professor of Molecular Imaging Chemistry
- Dr T. Adrian Carpenter – Director of Magnetic Resonance
- Dr Tim D. Fryer – Director of PET Physics
- Dr Guy B. Williams – Director of Information Processing
