= Gateway Island =

- Town
- Coordinates: 36.096°S 146.897°E
- Country: Australia
- State: Victoria
- Region: Hume
- LGA: City of Wodonga

Government
  - State electorate: Benambra
  - Federal division: Indi

Population
  - Total: 0 (SAL 2021)
- Postcode: 3694

Gateway Island is an unpopulated locality of the City of Wodonga local government area in northeast Victoria, Australia, adjacent to the Murray River and bounded in the south by the Wodonga Creek. The island is immediately to the south of neighbouring Albury, making it part of the larger Albury-Wodonga settlement.

The island is on Wiradjuri country, and was populated by Wiradjuri people for tens of thousands of years before European colonisation. Gateway Island is home to a cultural trail which features First Nations art and sculptures.

The island served as a customs post between the colonies of Victorian and New South Wales. Historical remnants of local industry can still be seen, such as the former butter factory and powder magazine.

Today, the island serves a variety of cultural purposes. Gateway Village houses Australia's leading regional theatre company, HotHouse Theatre, the Burraja Indigenous Cultural and Environmental Discovery Centre and several art galleries. The former customs house is now used as up-scale restaurant, La Maison, while local hotel Viktor's is adjacent to the village.

Several events are held here, with a designated space for travelling circuses, a fortnightly farmer's market and Gateway Lakes housing larger music concerts are among other common occurrences on the island.

Several walking tracks cross the island into local bush and swampland along the Murray River. Several billabongs and lagoons are also present, including near the village, which house a host of native plants and animals.
