= Mitchell Secondary College =

Coordinates: 36°07′50″S 146°53′26″E

Information
- Closed: 2006
- Grades: Year 7 - Year 12

Mitchell Secondary College was one of three public secondary schools educating years 7–12 in Wodonga, Victoria. It specialized in educating students from multicultural diversities from all over Australia. The school provided students with tailored learning curricula suited to each student's needs.

In 2005–2006, it formally merged and pooled resources with the other two public secondary schools in Wodonga: Wodonga High School and Wodonga West Secondary College. Mitchell and Wodonga West became a combined college over two campuses, specializing in years 7, 8 and 9, known as Wodonga Middle Years College, which is loosely associated with Wodonga Senior Secondary College. As of 2006, the former Mitchell facility has become Wodonga Middle Years College Huon Campus.
