= KXOI =

Coordinates: 31°28′39″N 102°20′24″W

Crane, Texas; United States
- Broadcast area: Odessa, Texas
- Frequency: 810 kHz
- Branding: La Nueva

Programming
- Format: Spanish Religious

Ownership
- Owner: Maria Guel, Ana Guel, and Jennifer Juarez; (Hispanic Family Christian Network, Inc.)

History
- First air date: 1959
- Former call signs: KCRN (1959–1961); KCRM (1961–1963); KBSN (1963–1982)

Technical information
- Licensing authority: FCC
- Facility ID: 2823
- Class: B
- Power: 1,000 watts day; 500 watts night

Links
- Public license information: Public file; LMS

KXOI (810 AM) is a radio station licensed to Crane, Texas. The station airs a Spanish language religious radio format and is owned by Maria Guel, Ana Guel, and Jennifer Juarez, through licensee Hispanic Family Christian Network, Inc.

== History ==
The station began broadcasting in 1959, and was originally owned by Albert L. Crain. It held the call sign KCRN and broadcast at 1380 kHz, running 1,000 watts during daytime hours only. Its call sign was changed to KCRM in 1961 and KBSN in 1963. In 1964, its frequency was changed to 970 kHz and in 1978 it was changed to 810 kHz. In 1968, the station was sold to Richard A. Peterson and Gary L. Miller for $68,000. It began nighttime operations at 500 watts in 1981.
