= WBIC-LP =

- Wilson, North Carolina; United States
- Broadcast area: Wilson County, North Carolina
- Frequency: 97.3 MHz
- Branding: "97.3 WBIC"

Programming
- Language: English
- Format: Christian radio
- Affiliations: Fundamental Broadcasting Network, Salem Radio Network

Ownership
- Owner: Tabernacle Baptist Church

History
- First air date: October 14, 2015; 10 years ago
- Call sign meaning: We Believe In Christ

Technical information
- Licensing authority: FCC
- Facility ID: 191641
- Class: L1
- ERP: 100 watts
- HAAT: 29 meters
- Transmitter coordinates: 35°44′11.2″N 77°58′37.1″W

Links
- Public license information: LMS

WBIC is a low power radio station licensed to Wilson, North Carolina. The station's studio is located at Tabernacle Baptist Church and its transmitting facility is located across Airport Boulevard on the campus of Wilson Christian Academy.

== History ==
Tabernacle Baptist Church and its pastor, Joe Shakour, applied for a low power radio station license from the Federal Communications Commission in the fall of 2013 and were awarded a construction permit the following year. The church filed for a license to cover the construction permit on October 14, 2015, and its license was granted on October 19, 2015.

== Programming ==
WBIC airs traditional Christian music. Most songs are in the public domain, and many are hymns. Hourly newscasts are from the Salem Radio Network and forecasts are from staff meteorologist Tom Churchill. In addition, WBIC broadcasts all Tabernacle Baptist Church worship services live.
