= National Institute of Circus Arts =

Australian tertiary-level circus school

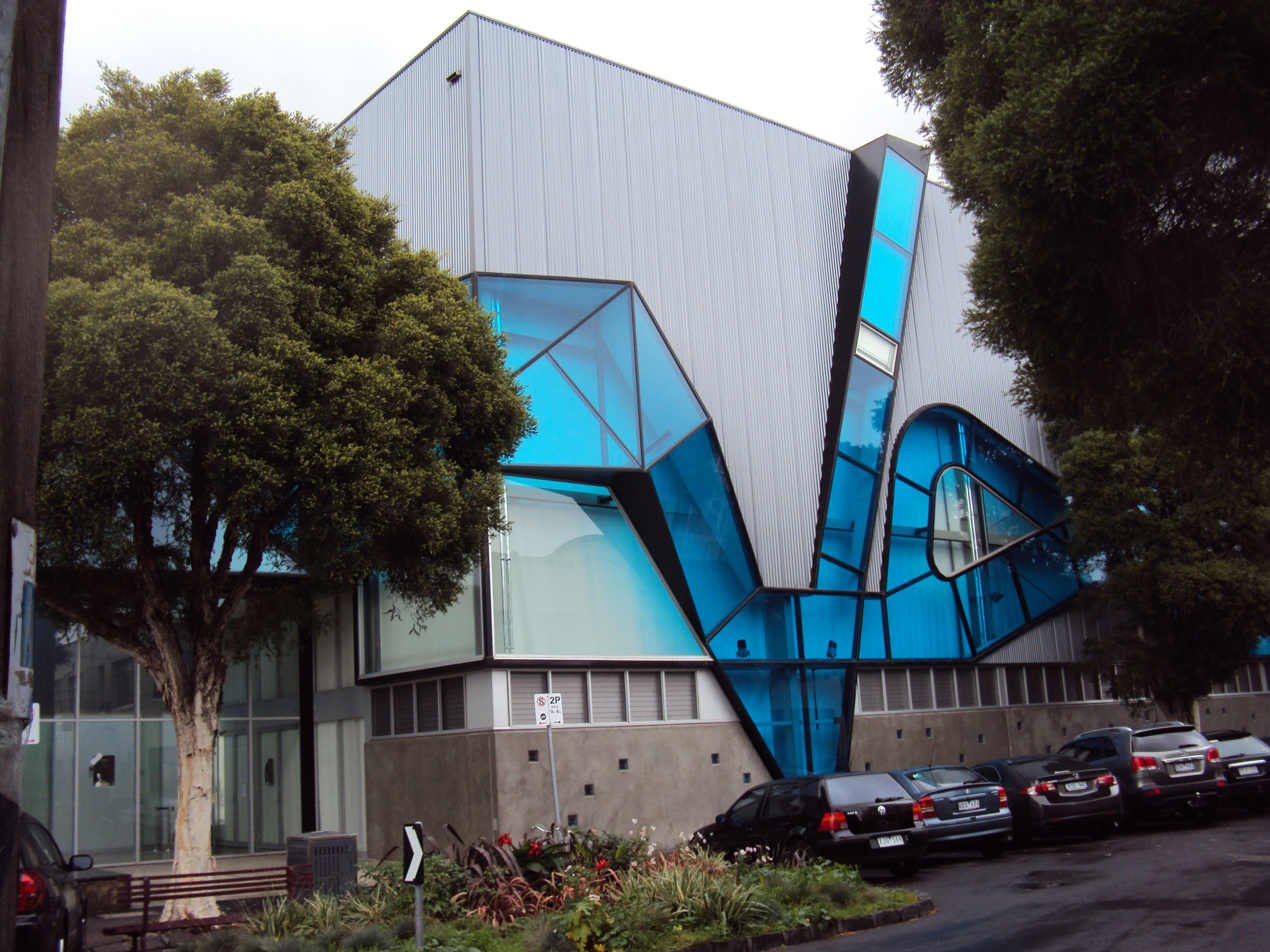
- NICA National Circus Centre, Melbourne
- Other name: NICA
- Established: 1995; 31 years ago
- Parent institution: Swinburne University of Technology
- Academic affiliations: Australian Roundtable for Arts Training Excellence
- Executive Director: Rose Stephens
- Location: Prahran, Melbourne, Victoria, Australia; 37°51′10″S 144°59′29″E
- Website: www.nica.com.au

The National Institute of Circus Arts (NICA) is a government-accredited tertiary-level circus school in Australia, located in Prahran, Victoria.

== History ==
NICA was established in 1995 by Swinburne University of Technology after a study revealed there was enough demand for a national body. The first course, a Diploma of Circus Arts, began in 1999 with eight participants from an unrenovated warehouse at Docklands. In 2001, the first Bachelor of Circus Arts course was offered with 23 students entering the course and the first degrees being conferred in 2003. In 2005, the institute moved into the new $10 million NICA National Circus Centre at the Prahran campus of Swinburne University, funded by the Australian Government, Swinburne and the Pratt Foundation.

As of 2026, NICA will be partnering with Collarts to ensure their Circus Arts education remains intact, Collarts will continue with the accreditation of the course and will deliver academic regulation and guidance. Throughout 2025, NICA will begin transitioning from their partnership with Swinburne and begin delivering their VET courses with Collarts.

== Description ==
NICA is the only government-accredited tertiary educational institution that provides professional training in contemporary circus arts in Australia. It is a subsidiary of Swinburne University of Technology and is based at the university's Prahran campus.

NICA is one of eight "national elite training organisations" of the "Australian Roundtable for Arts Training Excellence" (ARTS8), partially funded by the Australian Government via the Office for the Arts.

== Courses ==
The institute's core training offering is a three-year Bachelor of Circus Arts. It also offers a Diploma of Circus Arts, an Advanced Diploma of Circus Arts, and a number of workshops and short courses.

In 2010, it offered a Certificate III in Circus Arts for students combining their circus training with their final two years of secondary school, with academic provider VCA Secondary School. It also offered Certificate IV in Circus Arts, a one-year program in basic Circus Skills, suitable for school-leavers (18 years or older).

In 2011, there were 60 enrolled students.

== See also ==
- Cirkidz
- Flying Fruit Fly Circus School
- National Centre for Circus Arts (United Kingdom)
