= WSSC (AM) =

- Sumter, South Carolina; United States
- Frequency: 1340 kHz

Programming
- Format: Christian
- Affiliations: Fundamental Broadcasting Network

Ownership
- Owner: Sumter Baptist Temple, Inc.

History
- Call sign meaning: Sumter, South Carolina

Technical information
- Facility ID: 39621
- Class: C
- Power: 1,000 watts (day); 1,000 watts (night)
- Transmitter coordinates: 33°55′45″N 80°19′29″W
- Translator: 92.7 (W224DQ)

WSSC (1340 AM) is a radio station broadcasting a Christian radio format. WSSC is licensed to serve the community of Sumter, South Carolina, United States. The station is currently owned by Sumter Baptist Temple, Inc. and features programming from Fundamental Broadcasting Network.
