= Victorian College of the Arts Secondary School =

Location
- 57 Miles Street; Southbank, Melbourne, Victoria; Australia; 37°49′42″S 144°57′54″E

Information
- Type: Government-funded co-educational selective and specialist secondary day school
- Motto: Art is life
- Established: 1978; 48 years ago
- Founders: Lenton Parr; Jack Pitt; Government of Victoria; Victorian College of the Arts
- Specialists: Performing arts; Visual arts
- Principal: Hilary Bland
- Grades: 7–12
- Enrolment: 370
- Affiliations: Australian Ballet School; Gymnastics Victoria; University of Melbourne
- Website: www.vcass.vic.edu.au

Victorian College of the Arts Secondary School (VCASS), is a government-funded co-educational selective and specialist secondary day school, with speciality in the performing and visual arts, located within the Melbourne Arts Precinct in Southbank, Melbourne, Victoria, Australia. Founded in 1978, VCASS teaches students from Year 7 to Year 12; and has an enrolment of 370 students.

Students are accepted after annual auditions and interviews. All students share academic subjects, but follow either a specialised dance, music, theatre arts or visual arts training program for half the day. The school also provides academic classes to secondary students from other institutions including the Australian Ballet School, and Gymnastics Victoria.

== History ==
Instigated by the former tertiary institution Victorian College of the Arts (VCA), as a separate and complementary institution, VCASS was founded in 1978 by Lenton Parr and Jack Pitt (as the Victorian College of the Arts Technical School – VCATS). This was the same year that the tertiary VCA commenced its dance faculty, and VCATS was conceived as a preparatory school for the tertiary dance and music courses. In 1981 the name was changed to VCASS. From 1978 to 2009 VCASS shared its campus and buildings with the tertiary VCA at 234 St Kilda Road, but in June 2009 moved to new purpose built premises at 57 Miles Street, Southbank.

The Dance and Music specialist programs run in parallel from Year 7 to 12. In 2013 the school added a Year 11 intake for its Visual Arts program. In 2016 a new Theatre Arts program commenced with a Year 11 intake.

== Academics ==
Victorian Certificate of Education (VCE) studies offered by the school:
Art, Biology, Chemistry, Dance, Drama, English, English (EAL), French, Further Mathematics, General Mathematics, Health and Human Development, History: 20th Century (1900–1945), History: 20th Century (since 1945), History: Revolutions, Literature, Mathematical Methods (CAS), Media, Music Investigation, Music Performance, Music Style and Composition, Philosophy, Physics, Psychology, Art Making and Exhibiting, Drama and Theatre Studies.

Some students study additional languages via Distance Education Victoria, such as Mandarin, Korean, Japanese, Indonesian, German or Spanish.

In 2011, the VCE median study score was 34, and 27 percent of students achieved a study score above 40.

== Notable alumni ==
- Zoë Black – violinist
- Rebecca Chambers – pianist, 1995 Young Australian of the Year
- Alicia Banit – actress
- Sonny Chua (1967–2020) – concert pianist, composer
- Natalie Gauci – vocalist
- Greg Horsman – dancer and choreographer, former principal Australian Ballet and Senior Principal English National Ballet
- Charlotte Nicdao – actor
- Marshall McGuire – harpist
- Patrick Savage – film composer and former principal first violin with the Royal Philharmonic Orchestra

== See also ==
- List of schools in Victoria, Australia
- Performing arts education in Australia
- Visual arts education in Australia
