= WOTC (FM) =

- Edinburg, Virginia; United States
- Broadcast area: Shenandoah County, Virginia
- Frequency: 88.3 MHz
- Branding: 88.3 WOTC

Programming
- Format: Religious
- Affiliations: Fundamental Broadcasting Network; USA Radio News

Ownership
- Owner: Valley Baptist Church - Christian School

History
- First air date: August 6, 1993
- Call sign meaning: Winning Others To Christ

Technical information
- Licensing authority: FCC
- Facility ID: 69673
- Class: A
- Power: 1,000 Watts
- HAAT: 123 meters (404 ft)
- Transmitter coordinates: 38°48′13.0″N 78°41′21.0″W

Links
- Public license information: Public file; LMS
- Webcast: WOTC Webstream
- Website: WOTC Online

WOTC is a Religious formatted broadcast radio station licensed to Edinburg, Virginia, serving Woodstock and Shenandoah County, Virginia. WOTC is owned and operated by Valley Baptist Church - Christian School.

== Programming ==
WOTC carries programs from area churches along with religious and Christian music from local artists mixed with programs from the Fundamental Broadcasting Network located in Morehead City, North Carolina. It also carries news programming from USA Radio News.
