= WYZI =

Radio station in Royston, Georgia

- Royston, Georgia; United States
- Broadcast area: Franklin, Madison, Hart Counties (GA)
- Frequency: 810 kHz
- Branding: 95.9 The Beat of Athens

Programming
- Format: Urban adult contemporary
- Affiliations: Fox News Radio

Ownership
- Owner: Oconee River Broadcasting, LLC

History
- First air date: 1972 (as WBLW)
- Former call signs: WBLW (1972–1990); WBIC (1990–2009); WXFO (2009–2014)

Technical information
- Licensing authority: FCC
- Facility ID: 3079
- Class: D
- Power: 230 watts day
- Transmitter coordinates: 34°16′50.00″N 83°7′9.00″W
- Translators: 95.9 W240EK (Athens); 100.3 W262DB (Royston)

Links
- Public license information: Public file; LMS
- Webcast: Listen live
- Website: WYZI Online

WYZI (810 AM, "95.9 The Beat of Athens") is a radio station broadcasting an urban adult contemporary format. Licensed to Royston, Georgia, United States, it first began broadcasting under the call letters WBLW in 1972. The station is currently owned by Oconee River Broadcasting, LLC.

== History ==
The radio station currently assigned call letters WYZI signed on the air in Royston, GA in 1972 as WBLW (chosen for original owner B.L. "Slim" Williamson). Williamson founded and owned Chart Records in Nashville. The format was Country.

The station changed call letters to WBIC in 1990 when the station was purchased by Athena Broadcasting, who subsequently took sister station WPUP-FM (103.7) and moved it to Athens, a larger town nearby. Subsequent owners included Southern Broadcasting, A.C. Broadcasting, Lighthouse Broadcasting, Paul Hood and Diane Hawkins. The format remained either Country or Gospel through the entirety of the ownership transfers.

WXFO logo during its "Family Country" era

In late 2007, Oconee River Broadcasting, LLC, filed to purchase the station from Diane Hawkins. The transfer was approved on March 14, 2008. By this time, Oconee River had been operating the station under a LMA, and on January 1, 2008, had created a family-friendly Country format known as "Family Country".

WXFO's logo under previous news/talk format

On March 2, 2009, the call letters were changed to WXFO to coincide with the station's new news/talk format as "Fox News Radio 810". The station features conservative-leaning talk shows from Bill Bennett, Rush Limbaugh, Sean Hannity, Mark Levin and Dave Ramsey, among others.

On January 1, 2014, WXFO changed its format to sports, branded as "Sports Radio 810".

On May 15, 2014, WXFO changed its call letters to WYZI.

On April 15, 2018, WYZI began broadcasting on FM translator station W262DB (100.3 MHz) and flipped its format to classic hits as a partial simulcast of WLOV 1370 AM in Washington, Georgia.

On July 6, 2022, WYZI changed its format from classic hits to urban adult contemporary, branded as "95.9 The Beat of Athens".
