= WWOS (AM) =

- Walterboro, South Carolina; United States
- Broadcast area: Charleston metropolitan area
- Frequency: 810 kHz

Programming
- Format: Christian radio and southern gospel
- Affiliations: Fundamental Broadcasting Network; SRN News

Ownership
- Owner: Grace Baptist Church of Orangeburg
- Sister stations: WPOG, WWOS-FM

History
- First air date: August 23, 1962
- Former call signs: WQIZ (1962–2015)

Technical information
- Licensing authority: FCC
- Facility ID: 38899
- Class: D
- Power: 5,000 watts (days only)
- Transmitter coordinates: 33°8′51″N 80°33′47″W

Links
- Public license information: Public file; LMS
- Webcast: Listen live
- Website: wwosradio.net

WWOS (810 AM) is a noncommercial radio station licensed to Walterboro, South Carolina, United States, serving the Charleston metropolitan area. Currently owned by Grace Baptist Church of Orangeburg, it features a Christian format, along with Southern gospel music, operating during the daytime hours only.

WWOS's programming is heard around the clock on co-owned WWOS-FM (91.9) in St. George, and on WPOG in St. Matthews.

== History ==
The station signed on the air on August 23, 1962. The original call sign was WQIZ. It broadcast on 1300 kHz with 500 watts, as a daytimer. Its original city of license was St. George, South Carolina. In the 1970s, it moved to AM 810 and received a boost in power to 5,000 watts, but still limited to daytime hours only. It played R&B music and was programmed for the African American community of Charleston and nearby communities.

WQIZ was sold in 2015 to the Grace Baptist Church of Orangeburg. The station switched its call sign to WWOS and its new city of license became Walterboro, after the sale of WALI to Apex Media, which had plans to move WALI to Hilton Head.
