= Helpmann Academy =

Arts support organisation for emerging practitioners

The Helpmann Academy is an organisation that provides support emerging artists in the performing and visual arts, located in Adelaide, South Australia. It is named in honour of Sir Robert Helpmann, a famous Australian dancer.

== History ==
The Helpmann Academy was formed in 1994 as a partnership of the major tertiary arts training institutions in South Australia.

== Partners and functions ==
The Helpmann Academy is a partnership among:

- Flinders University, College of Humanities, Arts and Social Sciences
- University of Adelaide, Elder Conservatorium of Music
- University of South Australia, UniSA Creative

The Adelaide Central School of Art ceased its partnership with the Academy in 2016, following changes to funding.

The Helpmann Academy provides support for provides support for emerging visual and performing artists through a program of exhibitions, mentoring programs, funding, and other means.

== Governance and funding ==
Helpmann Academy's board of governors consists of vice chancellors from South Australia's three universities or their delegates, and leading representatives from the arts, creative, cultural and business sectors.

Helpmann Academy is funded by the partner universities, the Government of South Australia, philanthropic partners, donors, grants, and a small number of corporate partners.

== International connections ==
The Helpmann Academy has strong links with arts institutions across the globe including Italy, France, China, India, and New Zealand. Exchanges and residencies take place in the visual arts, drama, dance, and music. Visits by performers and artists from around the world are also encouraged.

== Events ==
The annual graduate exhibition of visual artists features work from graduates of UniSA and Flinders. In 2024, the 30th anniversary of the academy, the exhibition featured ceramics, glass, video art, painting, photography, printmaking, sculpture, fashion, costume design, and textiles by 22 young artists.

== Types of support ==
Support offered to young artists includes or has included:

- Helpmann Academy Graduate Exhibition provides students with the opportunity to showcase their work and launch their visual arts careers. In 2024, there were 17 awards available, valued at more A$82,000.
- Helpmann Academy Creative Innovator Program, starting with a pilot in 2021, provides opportunities for up to 13 participants across nine different projects. Funding of A$2,000 is provided over eight months, along with mentoring by an established arts practitioner and access to masterclasses by business professionals, and various other options. At the end of the period, major seed funding for selected recipients is provided.
- JamFactory x Helpmann Academy Scholarships, in 2025 offering two scholarships worth A$2,500 for the JamFactory's Foundation Year Associate Program in Ceramics, Glass, Furniture or Jewellery/Metal.
- Various collaborations with the Hill Smith Gallery, supporting visual artists since around 2003
- Helpmann Academy Langley Award for Jazz, worth A$7,500
- Helpmann Academy Award for Voice, worth A$5,000, open to final year students or graduates from eligible programs from the Elder Conservatorium of Music at the University of Adelaide
- 2024: A one-off artist commission in collaboration with the City of Adelaide, for a visual artist to create site-specific artwork on temporary hoarding within scaffolding on the Adelaide Town Hall façade, to be installed in late October 2024 and expected to be removed in February 2025. The project includes mentorship with a well-known artist, and $4,500 to cover artist fee along with design, creation, and installation of the 2D or 3D work.
- 2024: A Night of Jazz - the opportunity for up to three groups or individuals of Helpmann Academy alumni to perform their jazz music at a concert featuring Jazzmeia Horn; in collaboration with the City of Adelaide, payments of $300 per individual or $1000 for a group are included
