= County of Benambra =

Coordinates: 36°30′S 147°50′E

Benambra
- Cadastral division
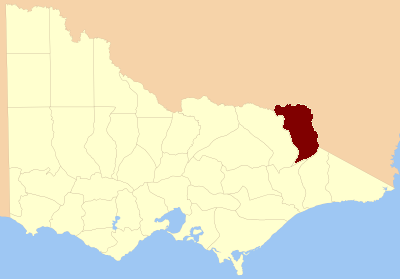
- Location in Victoria
- Country: Australia
- State: Victoria
- Established: 24 February 1871

Area
  - Total: 7,120 km^{2} (2,750 sq mi)
Lands administrative divisions around Benambra
Goulburn (NSW)	Selwyn (NSW)	Selwyn (NSW)
Bogong	Benambra	Selwyn (NSW)
Dargo	Tambo	Tambo

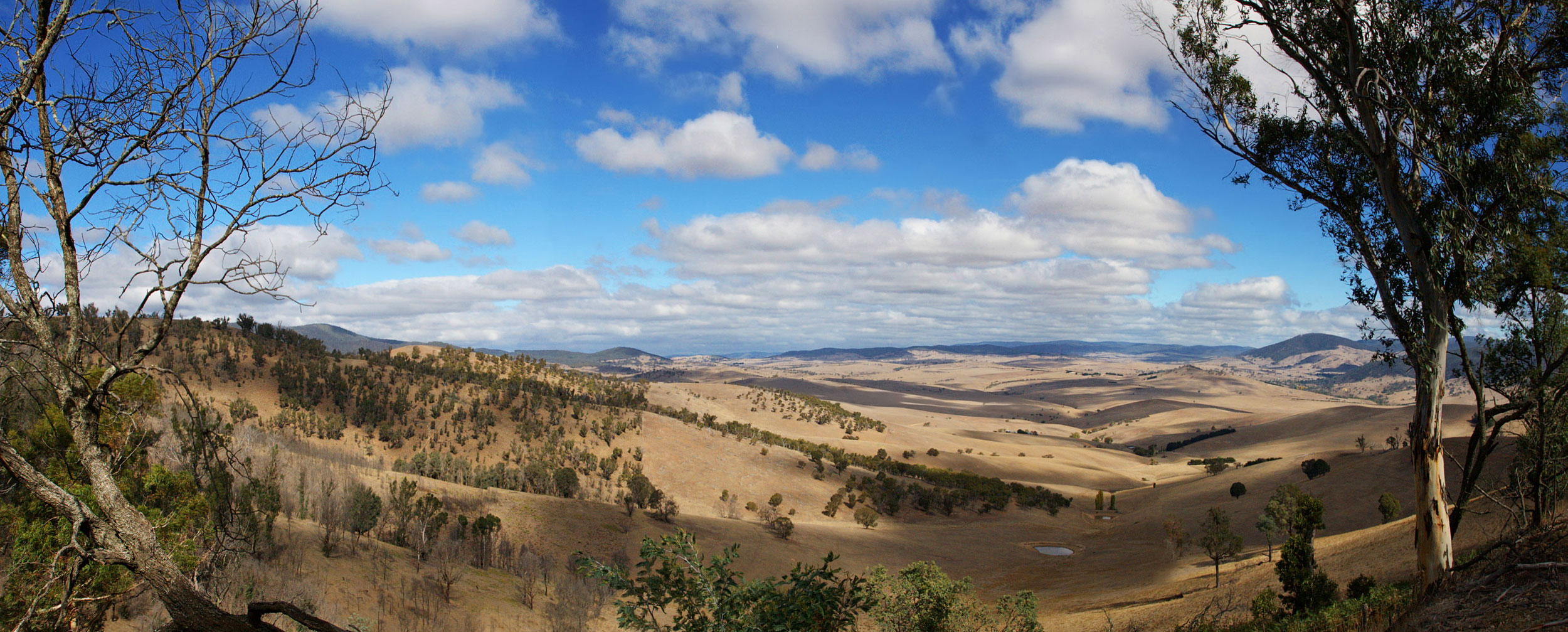
View of the land near Benambra

The County of Benambra is one of the 37 counties of Victoria which are part of the cadastral divisions of Australia, used for land titles. It is located between the Mitta Mitta River in the west, and the Murray River to the north and east. The town of Benambra is located near the southern edge. The area of the county roughly corresponds with the Electoral district of Benambra. Corryong is the largest town in the county. The county was proclaimed in 1871.

== Parishes ==
Parishes include:

- Adjie, Victoria
- Beloka, Victoria
- Benambra, Victoria
- Berringa, Victoria
- Berringama, Victoria
- Bullioh, Victoria
- Bungil East, Victoria
- Bungil, Victoria
- Burrowye, Victoria
- Burrungabugge, Victoria
- Canabore, Victoria
- Cobungra, Victoria
- Colac Colac, Victoria
- Corryong, Victoria
- Cudgewa, Victoria
- Dartella, Victoria
- Enano, Victoria
- Gibbo, Victoria
- Granya, Victoria
- Gungarlan, Victoria
- Hinno-Munjie, Victoria
- Indi, Victoria
- Jemba, Victoria
- Jinderboine, Victoria
- Jinjellic, Victoria
- Kancobin, Victoria
- Keelangie, Victoria
- Koetong, Victoria
- Kosciusko, Victoria
- Malkara, Victoria
- Mitta Mitta, Victoria
- Mowamba, Victoria
- Moyangul, Victoria
- Nariel, Victoria
- Pinnibar, Victoria
- Talgarno, Victoria
- Tatonga, Victoria
- Thologolong, Victoria
- Thorkidaan, Victoria
- Thowgla, Victoria
- Tintaldra, Victoria
- Towong, Victoria
- Wabba, Victoria
- Wagra, Victoria
- Walwa, Victoria
- Welumla, Victoria
- Wyeeboo, Victoria
- Yabba, Victoria
