= Shire of Tallangatta =

Coordinates: 36°11′S 147°15′E

Shire of Tallangatta Victoria
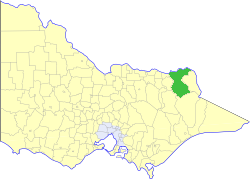
- Location in Victoria
- The Shire of Tallangatta as at its dissolution in 1994
- Population: 4,350 (1992)
  - Density: 1.0634/km^{2} (2.754/sq mi)
- Established: 1869
- Area: 4,090.72 km^{2} (1,579.4 sq mi)
- Council seat: Tallangatta
- Region: Hume
- County: Benambra, Bogong
LGAs around Shire of Tallangatta:
Wodonga	Greater Hume (NSW)	Tumbarumba (NSW)
Yackandandah	Shire of Tallangatta	Upper Murray
Bright	Omeo	Omeo

The Shire of Tallangatta was a local government area about 340 kilometres (211 mi) northeast of Melbourne, the state capital of Victoria, Australia. The shire covered an area of 4,090.72 square kilometres (1,579.4 sq mi), and existed from 1869 until 1994.

== History ==
Tallangatta was first incorporated as the Towong Road District on 12 March 1869, and was proclaimed the Shire of Towong on 1 May 1874. In October 1920, the Corryong Riding and part of the Murray Riding split away to form the Shire of Upper Murray. On 8 March 1974, the shire was renamed from Towong to Tallangatta.

On 18 November 1994, the Shire of Tallangatta was abolished, and along with the Shire of Upper Murray, was merged into the newly created Shire of Towong — hence restoring the original pre-1920 entity.

== Wards ==
Tallangatta was divided into three ridings, each of which elected three councillors:

- Murray Riding
- Mitta Mitta Riding
- Tallangatta Riding

== Towns and localities ==
- Bellbridge
- Bethanga
- Bullioh
- Burrowye
- Burrowa-Pine Mountain
- Cravensville
- Dartmouth
- Eskdale
- Granya
- Guys Forest
- Mitta Mitta
- Mount Granya State Park
- Mount Lawson State Park
- Talgarno
- Tallandoon
- Tallangatta*
- Walwa
- Wyeeboo

* Council seat.

== Population ==
Year	Population
1954	4,385
1958	4,580*
1961	4,207
1966	4,073
1971	3,768
1976	5,097
1981	3,798
1986	3,908
1991	4,150

* Estimate in the 1958 Victorian Year Book.
