= Shire of Upper Murray =

Coordinates: 36°12′S 147°54′E

Shire of Upper Murray Victoria
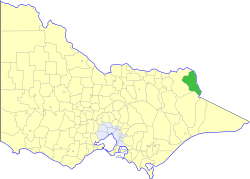
- Location in Victoria
- The Shire of Upper Murray as at its dissolution in 1994
- Population: 2,450 (1992)
  - Density: 0.9960/km^{2} (2.580/sq mi)
- Established: 1920
- Area: 2,459.81 km^{2} (949.7 sq mi)
- Council seat: Corryong
- Region: Hume
- County: Benambra
LGAs around Shire of Upper Murray:
| Tallangatta | Greater Hume (NSW) | Tumbarumba (NSW) |
| Tallangatta | Shire of Upper Murray | Tumbarumba (NSW) |
| Tallangatta | Omeo | Tumbarumba (NSW) |

The Shire of Upper Murray was a local government area about 400 kilometres (249 mi) northeast of Melbourne, the state capital of Victoria, Australia. The shire covered an area of 2,459.81 square kilometres (949.7 sq mi), and existed from 1920 until 1994.

== History ==
Upper Murray originally existed as the Corryong Riding and part of the Murray Riding of the Shire of Towong, and was first incorporated as a shire on 1 October 1920.

On 18 November 1994, the Shire of Upper Murray was abolished, and along with the Shire of Tallangatta, was merged into the newly created Shire of Towong, restoring the original pre-1920 entity.

== Ridings ==
The Shire of Upper Murray was divided into three ridings, each of which elected three councillors:

- Corryong Riding
- Cudgewa Riding
- Tintaldra Riding

== Towns and localities ==
- Biggara
- Corryong*
- Cudgewa
- Staceys Bridge
- Tintaldra
- Towong

* Council seat.

== Population ==
| Year | Population |
|---|---|
| 1954 | 2,521 |
| 1958 | 2,670* |
| 1961 | 2,938 |
| 1966 | 3,335 |
| 1971 | 2,676 |
| 1976 | 2,557 |
| 1981 | 2,463 |
| 1986 | 2,428 |
| 1991 | 2,341 |

* Estimate in the 1958 Victorian Year Book.
