= List of places on the Victorian Heritage Register in the Shire of Towong =

This is a list of places on the Victorian Heritage Register in the Shire of Towong in Victoria, Australia. The Victorian Heritage Register is maintained by the Heritage Council of Victoria.

The Victorian Heritage Register, as of 2021, lists the following thirty-four state-registered places within the Shire of Towong:

Place name	Place #	Location	Suburb or Town	Co-ordinates	Built	State registered	Photo
Bethanga Bridge	VHR H0989	Riverina Highway	Bellbridge	36.090111°S 147.058306°E	1927	14 July 2005	
Dart River Gold Battery Site	VHR H1267	Sipthorpe Track	Nariel Valley, Dartmouth	36.521611°S 147.771889°E	1851	19 December 1996	
Glengarry Gold Battery and Chlorination Works	VHR H1278	Corryong-Benambra Road	Dartmouth	36.528861°S 147.787528°E	1937	19 December 1996	
Greens Creek Battery Site	VHR H1266	Alpine National Park	Dartmouth	36.578639°S 147.640611°E	1884	19 December 1996	
La Mascotte Gold Battery Site and Chlorination Works	VHR H1276	Sipthorpe Track	Nariel Valley	36.519139°S 147.775361°E	1897	19 December 1996	
Mount Merrimac Gold Battery Site	VHR H1304	Lightning Creek	Mitta Mitta	36.651111°S 147.356139°E	1890	27 March 1997	
Pioneer and Union Hydraulic Gold Sluicing Site	VHR H1229	Omeo Highway	Mitta Mitta	36.542000°S 147.373750°E	1859	28 November 1996	
Thologolong Homestead	VHR H1832	4770 Murray River Road (Stockyard Creek Track)	Thologolong	35.990111°S 147.393083°E	1927	9 September 1999	
Tintaldra General Store and Former Bakery	VHR H0777	3 Main Street	Tintaldra	36.047056°S 147.931778°E	1864	30 November 1990	
Young Australian Battery and Gold Cyaniding Works	VHR H1761	Glendart Track	Dartmouth	36.542722°S 147.786611°E	1883	26 November 1998	
