= Colac Colac =

- Town
- Coordinates: 36.2156°S 147.8519°E
- Country: Australia
- State: Victoria
- Region: Hume
- LGA: Shire of Towong
- Location: 8 km (5.0 mi) southwest of Corryong

Government
  - State electorate: Benambra
  - Federal division: Indi

Population
  - Total: 61 (SAL 2021)
Localities around Colac Colac
Cudgewa		Corryong
	Colac Colac
Nariel Valley		Thowgla Valley

Colac Colac is a locality in the Hume region of the Australian state of Victoria. It is adjacent to the Murray Valley Highway, 8 kilometres (5.0 mi) southwest of Corryong.

There is a half-sealed cycling and walking trail from the Colac Colac Caravan Park in to the town of Corryong.
