= Old Tallangatta =

- Town
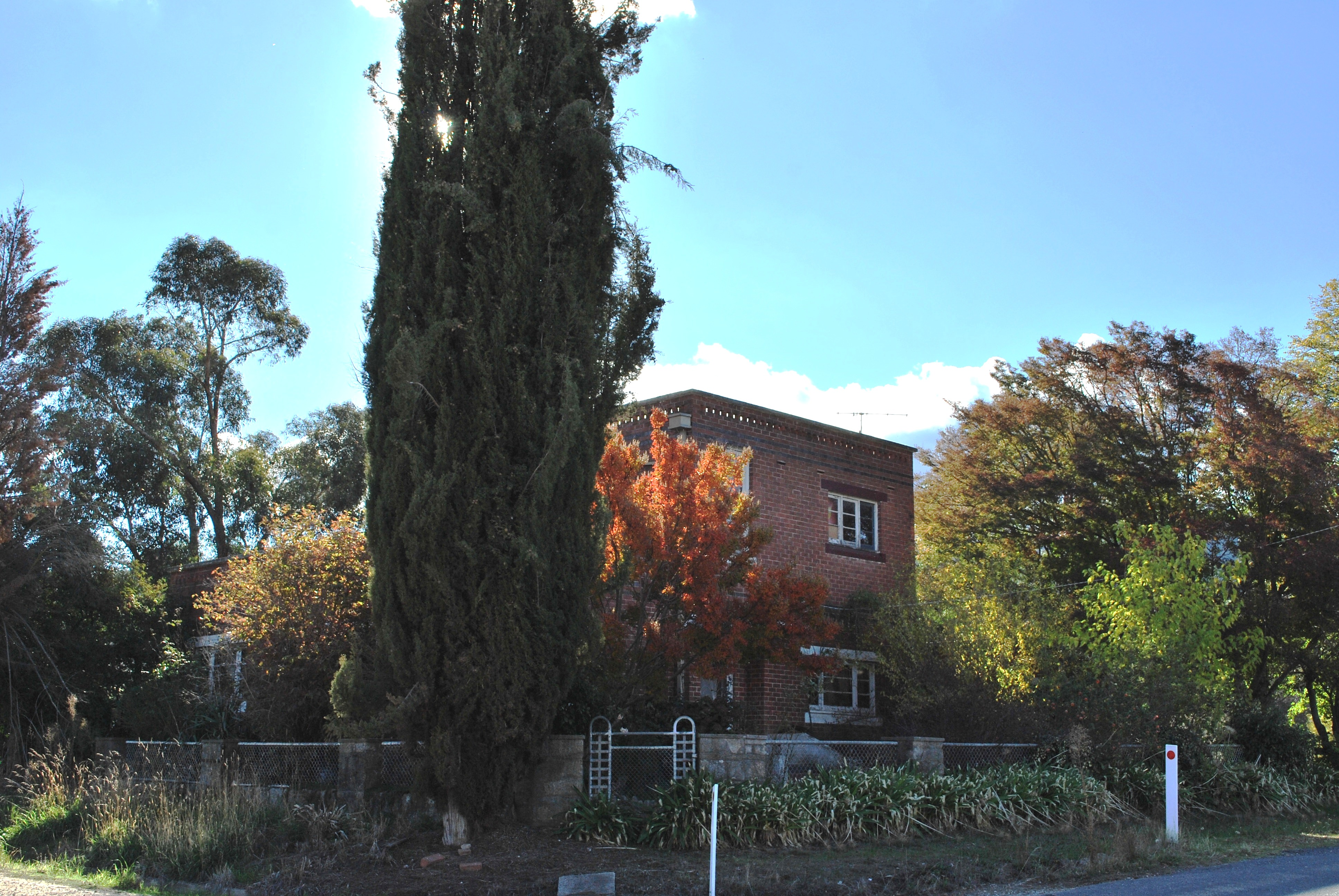
- A residence in Old Tallangatta

- Coordinates: 36°11′41″S 147°15′9″E
- Country: Australia
- State: Victoria
- Region: Hume
- LGA: Shire of Towong
- Location: 372 km (231 mi) NE of Melbourne; 50 km (31 mi) E of Wodonga; 8 km (5.0 mi) E of Tallangatta

Government
  - State electorate: Benambra
  - Federal division: Indi

Population
  - Total: 35 (2016 census)
- Postcode: 3701

Old Tallangatta is a locality in north-east Victoria, Australia. It is in the Shire of Towong local government area, at the upper end of the Mitta Arm of Lake Hume, near the confluence of the Mitta Mitta River and Tallangatta Creek, 372 kilometres (231 mi) north-east of the state capital, Melbourne.

It is the original site of Tallangatta. In 1956, the town was relocated to a new site on higher ground 8 kilometres (5 mi) away, to allow for an increase in the height of the Hume Dam, which resulted in a nine metre rise in the level of the water in Lake Hume.

Some people still live in the part of Old Tallangatta that was above the new high-water mark. At the 2016 census, Old Tallangatta had a population of 35.

The grid layout of the streets of Old Tallangatta is clearly visible in Google Earth.
