= Tallandoon =

- Town
- Coordinates: 36°24′2″S 147°13′25″E
- Country: Australia
- State: Victoria
- Region: Hume
- LGA: Shire of Towong

Government
  - State electorate: Benambra
  - Federal division: Indi

Population
  - Total: 92 (2021 census)
- Postcode: 3701

Tallandoon is a locality in the Shire of Towong, Victoria, Australia. At the 2021 census, Tallandoon had a population of 92.

== History ==
By 1902, Tallandoon had daily mail service and telephone communication with Tallangatta. The surrounding area was primarily grazing country, with some slopes considered suitable for growing oats, barley, and grapes. A public hall was built in the 1890s.
