= Shire of Towong =

Coordinates: 36°19′00″S 147°29′00″E

- Local government area
- Location in Victoria

- Interactive map of Shire of Towong
- Country: Australia
- State: Victoria
- Region: Hume
- Established: 1994
- Council seat: Tallangatta

Government
  - Mayor: Peter Tolsher
  - State electorate: Benambra
  - Federal division: Indi

Area
  - Total: 6,675 km^{2} (2,577 sq mi)

Population
  - Total: 6,223 (2021 census)
  - Density: 0.93228/km^{2} (2.4146/sq mi)
- Gazetted: 18 November 1994
- Website: Shire of Towong
LGAs around Shire of Towong
Wodonga	Greater Hume (NSW)	Snowy Valleys (NSW)
Indigo	Shire of Towong	Snowy Valleys (NSW)
Alpine	East Gippsland	Snowy Valleys (NSW)

The Shire of Towong (/ˈtaʊɒŋ/; first syllable to rhyme with wow) is a local government area in the Hume region of Victoria, Australia, located in the north-east part of the state. It covers an area of 6,675 square kilometres (2,577 mi^{2}) and in August 2021 had a population of 6,223.

It includes the service towns of Corryong and Tallangatta and the rural towns of Bethanga, Bellbridge, Cudgewa, Dartmouth, Eskdale, Mitta Mitta, Tintaldra and Walwa.

The shire is nestled between Australia's highest peaks, from Mount Bogong near Eskdale Spur to the foothills of Mount Kosciuszko at Tom Groggin. It is also home to Pine Mountain, reportedly the largest monolith in Australia. The Shire is bordered by the Murray River to the north and the Mitta Mitta River in the south.

The Shire is governed and administered by the Towong Shire Council. Its seat of local government and administrative centre is located at the council headquarters in Tallangatta; it also has a service centre located in Corryong.

== History ==
The first entity known as the "Shire of Towong" was formed in 1874. It occupied the same region as the modern LGA. In October 1920 the eastern part of the shire was severed to form the Shire of Upper Murray. No longer containing the Towong locality, the Shire of Towong was renamed the Shire of Tallangatta in 1974.

As part of the substantial local government reforms of 1994, the Shire of Towong was created anew by amalgamating the Shires of Tallangatta and Upper Murray.

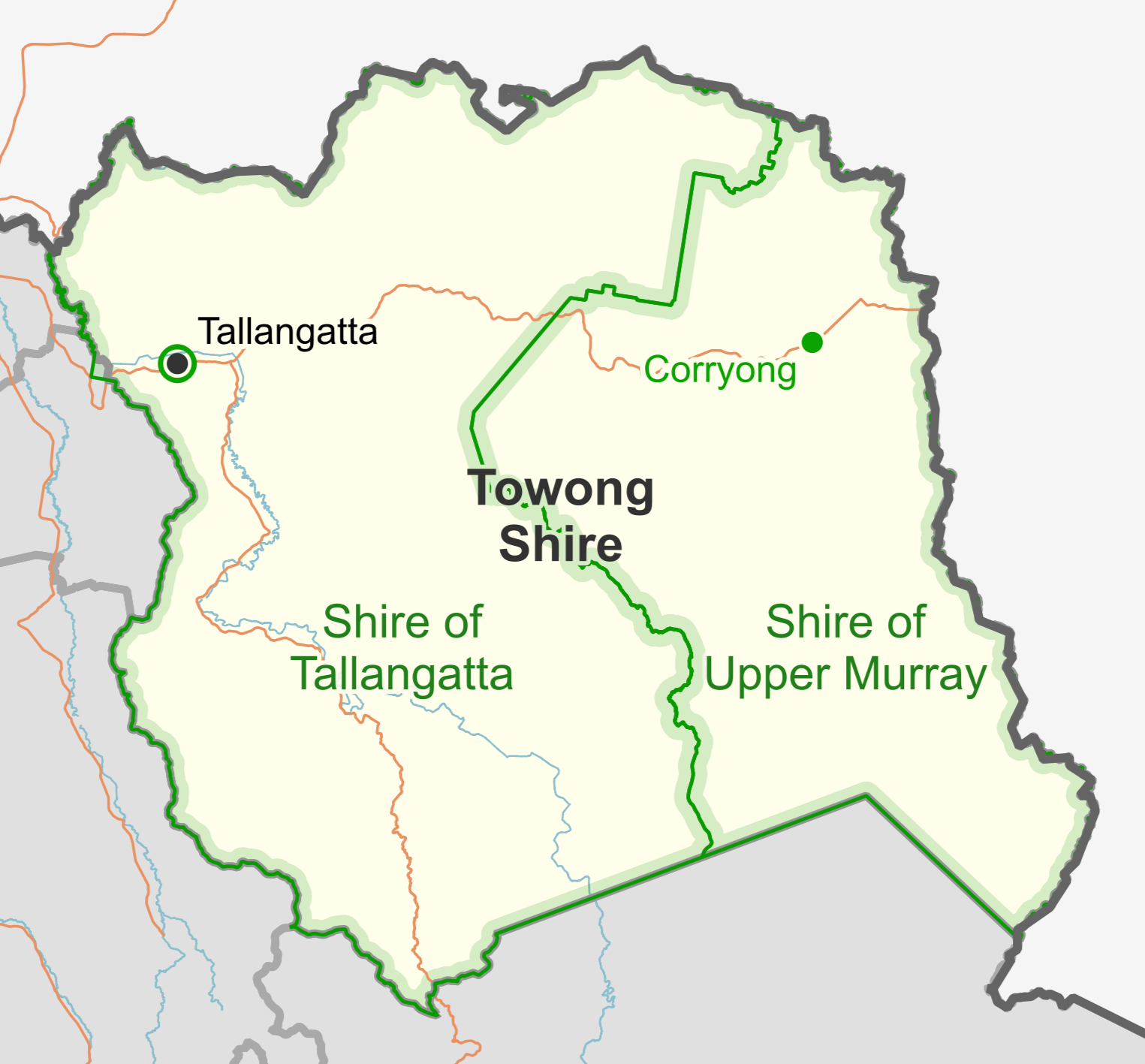
Towong Shire's predecessor LGAs (green) as they were in 1994. The administrative centres of the former LGAs are marked by green dots.

== Council ==
=== Current composition ===
The council is composed of five councillors elected to represent an unsubdivided municipality.

Ward	Councillor	Notes
Unsubdivided	David Wortmann	
Unsubdivided	Peter Tolsher	Mayor
Unsubdivided	Denise Anderson	Deputy Mayor
Unsubdivided	Jonathon Pitman	
Unsubdivided	Andrew Whitehead	

=== Administration and governance ===
The council meets in the council chambers at the council headquarters in the Tallangatta Municipal Offices as well as its offices in Corryong on alternating months. Tallangatta is the primary location of the council's administrative activities. It provides customer services at both its administrative centre in Tallangatta, the Tallangatta library and its service centre in Corryong.

== Townships and localities ==
According to the 2021 census, Towong Shire had a population of 6,223, up from 5,985 in the 2016 census.

Population
Locality	2016	2021
Bellbridge	370	393
Berringama	37	35
Bethanga	471	485
Biggara	49	61
Bullioh	75	63
Bungil	11	0
Burrowye	43	24
Colac Colac	51	61
Corryong	1,348	1,352
Cudgewa	261	254
Dartmouth	104	130
Eskdale	242	238
Georges Creek	62	75
Granya	99	88
Guys Forest	18	20
Huon^	219	206
Jarvis Creek	43	46
Koetong	20	26
Lucyvale	28	25
Mitta Mitta	171	171
Mount Alfred	26	39
Mount Elmo	0	0
Nariel Valley^	90	87
Old Tallangatta	35	45
Pine Mountain	34	32
Shelley	7	5
Talgarno	219	245
Tallandoon	79	92
Tallangatta	1,082	1,175
Tallangatta East	56	39
Tallangatta South	139	142
Tallangatta Valley	202	194
Thologolong	11	22
Thowgla Valley	82	70
Tintaldra	60	66
Tom Groggin	0	7
Towong	132	143
Towong Upper	34	37
Walwa	177	191

^ – Territory divided with another LGA

== See also ==
- List of localities (Victoria)
- List of places on the Victorian Heritage Register in the Shire of Towong
