= Tom Groggin =

- Town

- Location within Victoria
- Coordinates: 36.535775°S 148.097589°E
- Country: Australia
- State: Victoria
- Region: Hume
- LGA: Towong Shire

Government
  - State electorate: Benambra
  - Federal division: Indi

Population
  - Total: 7 (SAL 2021)
- Postcode: 3707
Localities around Tom Groggin
Nariel Valley	Geehi (NSW)	Kosciuszko National Park (NSW)
Nariel Valley	Tom Groggin	Kosciuszko National Park (NSW)
Benambra	Cobberas	Kosciuszko National Park (NSW)

Tom Groggin is a rural locality in north-eastern Victoria, Australia, located within the Towong Shire. It lies near the border with New South Wales along the upper Murray River.

Although access is most commonly via roads through New South Wales, including from Khancoban, Tom Groggin is officially situated in Victoria and administered by Towong Shire Council.

== Geography ==
Tom Groggin is located in the Victorian High Country within the Australian Alps, adjacent to Kosciuszko National Park and close to the headwaters of the Murray River. The landscape consists of alpine terrain, river flats and forested areas.

Prominent nearby features include Mount Pinnibar, one of the highest peaks in Victoria, and Walker's Lookout, which provides views across the Murray River valley and surrounding alpine landscape.

The locality is sparsely populated and contains no major township.

== History ==
Tom Groggin originated as a pastoral run during the expansion of European settlement in the mid-19th century, with grazing remaining a primary land use.

The broader region is associated with the history of alpine cattlemen and stock routes. Nearby areas are linked to stockman Jack Riley, considered an inspiration for Banjo Paterson's poem The Man from Snowy River.

== Land use and recreation ==
Land use in Tom Groggin is primarily grazing and outdoor recreation. The area is a recognised destination for four-wheel driving, bushwalking and hiking, particularly due to its proximity to alpine tracks and river crossings. Camping and fishing along the Murray River are also common activities.

The locality provides access to sections of the Bicentennial National Trail and nearby alpine routes connecting into Kosciuszko National Park.

River crossings at Tom Groggin provide access between Victoria and New South Wales, although access may vary depending on river conditions.

== See also ==
- Murray River
- Victorian High Country
- Towong Shire
