= Porepunkah police shootings =

2025 killing of police officers

- Victims Vadim De Waart-Hottart and Neal Thompson

- Porepunkah (Victoria) Porepunkah (Alpine Shire) Porepunkah (Australia)
- Location: 36°42′8″S 146°52′58″E; Porepunkah, Victoria, Australia
- Date: 26 August 2025; 10:37 am (AEST, UTC+10:00)
- Target: Victoria Police officers
- Weapon: Homemade shotgun
- Deaths: 2
- Injuries: 1
- Perpetrator: Dezi Freeman

The Porepunkah police shooting occurred on the morning of 26 August 2025, when Australian man Dezi Bird Freeman shot and killed police officers Neal Thompson and Vadim De Waart-Hottart and injured a third.

The officers were serving a search warrant at a property near the town of Porepunkah, in Victoria, Australia, in relation to Freeman’s alleged crime of child sexual abuse. Additionally, police planned on arresting Freeman. He was a known member of the sovereign citizen movement. As police made entry, Freeman shot and killed the two officers and injured a third before he fled into dense bushland in the Mount Buffalo National Park. A manhunt involving hundreds of police officers ensued, with Victoria Police supported by interstate police forces, the Australian Security Intelligence Organisation and the Australian Defence Force. The number of officers involved in the manhunt was unprecedented in Australian history, and there was a A$1 million reward for information leading to his arrest, which was the largest reward ever offered in Victorian history. On the morning of 30 March 2026, police officers shot and killed Freeman in Thologolong near Walwa. He had been on the run for 216 days.

A directions hearing as part of a coronial inquest into the deaths of the officers and a separate inquest into Freeman's death was held in May 2026 which heard that Freeman told both officers to "die in hell" as he stood over their bodies. The inquest briefs are due to be released by 30 October 2026, with the inquests to be held around March 2027.

== Background ==
Australia has strict laws restricting gun access since 1996, when 35 people were killed in the Port Arthur massacre. Thus, rates of homicide by perpetrators using firearms are low.

=== Dezi Freeman ===
Desmond Christopher Filby was born in 1969 or 1970. He attended school in the Melbourne suburb of Glen Waverley until 1977, when his family moved to the regional city of Wodonga. By 2003, Filby had adopted the name Dezi Bird Freeman. His new surname is popular in the sovereign citizen movement. Freeman worked as a freelance photographer. He was interested in bushcraft and had hiked in the Mount Buffalo National Park since he was 16; his son described it as his "second home".

From at least 2019, Freeman posted content on social media which was hostile to police and authority figures, including comments stating "the only good cop is a dead cop" and "[police] all need to be exterminated." The same perspective was conveyed in a 2024 court appearance over the cancellation of his driver's licence, wherein he labelled police "friggin Nazis" and "terrorist thugs". Freeman appeared often in the County Court at Wangaratta on a range of charges, and was known for having a hostile attitude and complicated or "baroque" defences typical of sovereign citizens. In an interview after the shootings, Freeman's estranged nephew said Freeman "always had this hidden anger about him". In 2020, his firearms licence was cancelled.

Sources contacted by The Age described Freeman's views as having become more extreme during the COVID-19 pandemic. He protested vaccines and lockdowns, and refused to wear masks, rejecting the validity of the exercise of any state power. Freeman was associated with a 2021 attempt to bring a private prosecution of treason against former Victorian Premier Daniel Andrews, which received news attention. He had previously appeared in the media on an episode of A Current Affair in 2018, concerning a dispute with neighbours. By 2025, he was speculating that the end times were approaching.

As of August 2025, Freeman was living with his wife and two children at a property near Porepunkah, a rural town 320 km (200 mi) northeast of Melbourne. Freeman's oldest son, aged 20, had moved out a year earlier. The compound, known as Four Gully Farm, owned by Andrew and Rebecca Swift, housed multiple people. At least one member of the couple shared his anti-government views, and discussed COVID-19 conspiracy theories. The Freemans' home consisted of a converted bus, a pole marquee, and shipping containers.

== Shootings ==
Image of Freeman released by Victoria Police

Around 10:30 am on 26 August 2025, ten Victoria Police officers, made up of local officers and members of the sexual offences and child abuse investigation team, attended the Four Gully Farm property to execute a search warrant at Freeman's home to search for child sexual abuse material and to arrest him. A prior risk assessment had concluded that the police tactical group the Special Operations Group (SOG) would not be required. The warrant was part of a firearms prohibition order, relating to a sexual offence against a child under the age of 16 alleged to have taken place within the previous two years. It was revealed after the shooting that hundreds of files of child abuse material were found on devices belonging to Freeman.

After the police arrived at his bus, Freeman, inside with his wife and two-year-old child, began arguing with and insulting the officers for around 34 minutes. Victoria Police would later describe Freeman's wife during the incident as uncooperative, and that she could be charged with obstruction. Police attempted to pry open the door but were unsuccessful. When Freeman refused to open it, Detective Leading Senior Constable Neal Thompson opened a window, and entered feet first before being shot in the head and neck by Freeman. De Waart-Hottart was shot in the head as he attempted to retreat from an annex attached to the bus. The remaining officers took shelter behind various vehicles and shipping containers as the shooting continued.

Freeman exited the bus after fatally shooting both Thompson and De Waart-Hottart and retrieved De Waart-Hottart's handgun and spare magazine while firing at other officers sheltering nearby. One officer suffered cuts from shattered glass, and another narrowly avoided being shot after Freeman fired at a shed the officer was taking cover behind. Freeman then used the handgun he had taken from De Waart-Hottart to shoot Thompson a second time, before stating "die in hell" over the bodies of the officers.

Freeman is said to have claimed that the warrant was "illegal" and that he did not recognise police authority at the time of the shootings.

The 27 minutes leading up to this were captured on a video filmed by a Freeman family member; after the two shots were heard, the recording ends. At some point after this, a third officer, a male detective, was shot in the leg, and he hid under the bus for nearly an hour waiting for help to arrive. Freeman tried to shoot a fourth officer, a female sergeant, but his homemade shotgun failed. Police officers fired shots in his direction but did not wound him. He subsequently escaped alone and on foot into the bush after taking the two dead police officers' handguns. He was believed by police to be armed with a homemade shotgun, a rifle and two police-issue handguns. Police described his dress as including dark green tracksuit pants, a dark green rain jacket, brown boots, and reading glasses.

The police SOG arrived by helicopter from Melbourne before midday. Local residents were advised to stay indoors, and Porepunkah Primary School was temporarily placed under lockdown.

== Victims ==
Detective Leading Senior Constable Neal Thompson, aged 59, and Belgian-born Senior Constable Vadim De Waart-Hottart, aged 35 were fatally shot.

Thompson, a week away from retirement, had joined Victoria Police in 1987. Across a 38-year career he worked in general duties at the Collingwood police station, as a detective based in Melbourne and in the Wangaratta Criminal Investigation Unit. He was chosen to serve the warrant as he had previously dealt with Freeman and had established a rapport. De Waart-Hottart joined Victoria Police in 2018 and had worked in general duties at the St Kilda police station before transferring to the Public Order Response Team in 2023. He was on temporary assignment in Wangaratta, and was fluent in Spanish, French and Flemish.

The detective shot in the leg was flown to The Alfred Hospital and underwent surgery. By 6 September, he was recovering at home.

The funerals of De Waart-Hottart and Thompson were held on 5 and 8 September 2025. Both services took place at the Victoria Police Academy in Glen Waverley, attended by more than a thousand mourners, including Prime Minister Anthony Albanese, Victorian Premier Jacinta Allan and Chief Commissioner of Victoria Police Mike Bush.

== Manhunt ==
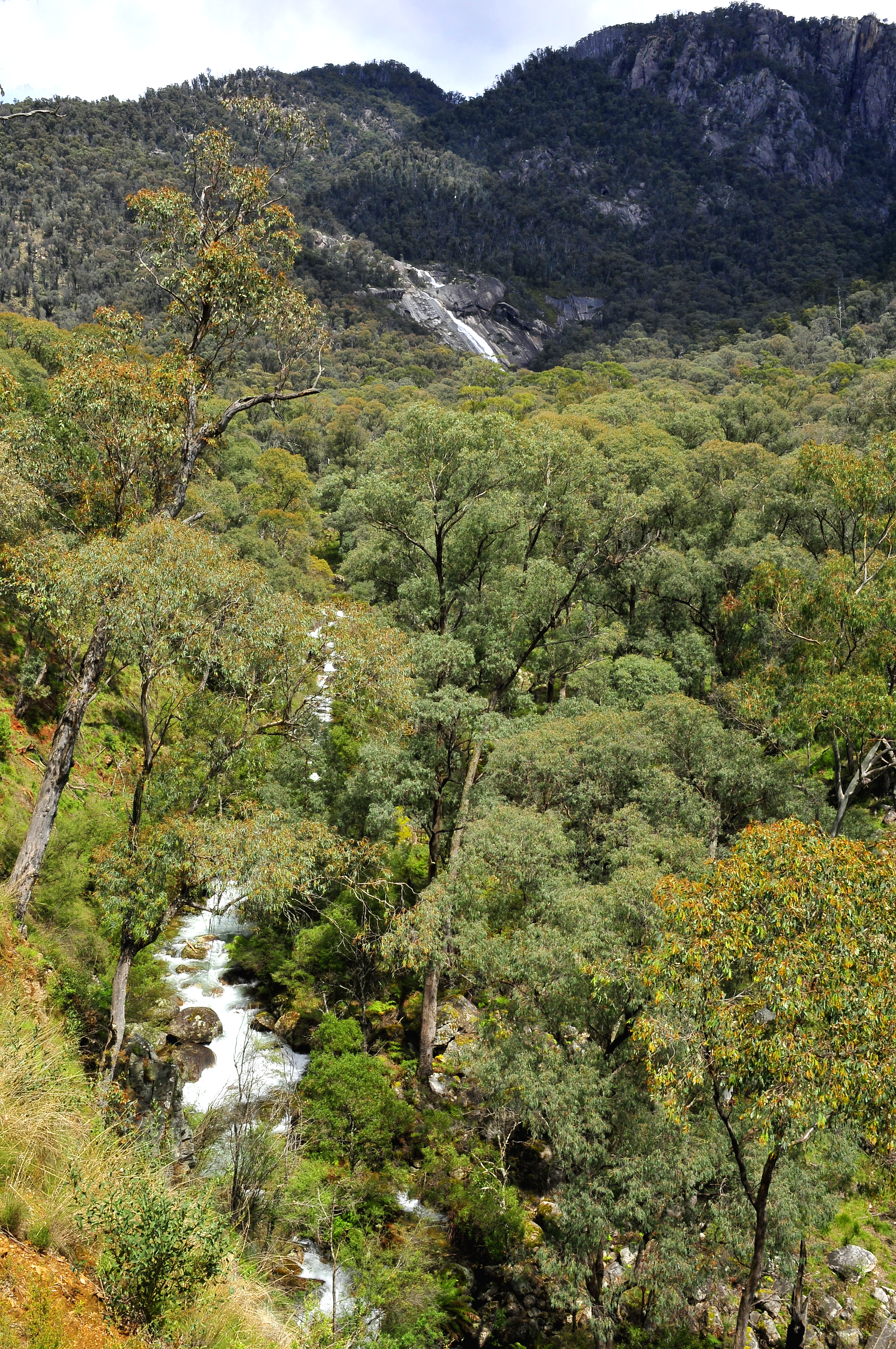
The Mount Buffalo National Park was closed as police searched for Freeman.

Nearly 500 officers were deployed to the Porepunkah area to search for Freeman, to investigate the shootings and to provide community assurance. (Note: The number of law enforcement personnel involved in the manhunt was unprecedented.) These included members of Victoria Police, bolstered with assistance from all interstate police forces, and from the Australian Federal Police. Assistance was also provided by the Australian Security Intelligence Organisation and the Australian Defence Force, as well as from other emergency services organisations. (Note: Other emergency services organisations included Ambulance Victoria and the State Emergency Service.)

Cold, snowy and windy winter weather conditions made the initial stages of the search difficult. The shootings occurred in the foothills of Mount Buffalo, a rugged, alpine region with dense bushland containing many natural caves, disused mineshafts and potential hideouts such as abandoned structures, huts and gorges, further hindering the search. Locals speculated that Freeman, an experienced bushman, could survive in the region for weeks.

A no-fly zone, prohibiting all aircraft including drones, was established over the search area and was extended multiple times. As of 29 September 2025, it remained in place over Porepunkah. Parks Victoria also closed Mount Buffalo National Park.

Freeman's wife became the focus of media attention. On 28 August, she was arrested with her 15-year-old son in a raid on a Porepunkah property. They were subsequently interviewed and released pending further inquiries. Four days later, she publicly urged her husband to surrender, and offered support to Victoria Police, saying she "does not hold anti-authority views", and expressing her condolences and sorrow for the deaths of the officers.

On 6 September, police announced a A$1 million reward for information leading to Freeman's capture, the largest ever offered in Victoria for an arrest. By 29 September they had received more than 1400 tips from members of the public. Several unconfirmed sightings led to tactical operations in and around the national park.

Mount Buffalo National Park is outlined in red. The location of the shootings is indicated by the blue marker.

On 12 September 17 days after the shooting, the police SOG in their search for Freeman were supported by police tactical officers from all Australian state and territory police tactical groups, and New Zealand, conducting the largest police tactical operation in Australian history, involving hundreds of officers and over 125 specialist officers. Two days later, warnings against travelling to the Porepunkah area were lifted, and residents were advised to remain vigilant.

As September ended, Victoria Police announced they had scaled back the search to around 200 officers, with numbers fluctuating as needs arose elsewhere. By then, police had searched over 40 square kilometres (15 sq mi) and hundreds of properties, both with and without the consent of owners. The manhunt had extended beyond the proximate area to locations including Goomalibee, a town 100 km (62 mi) west of Porepunkah. As of 2 October, the search continued to focus on Mount Buffalo National Park, which remained closed to the public.

Throughout the manhunt, several theories of Freeman's condition were put forward. Days after the shooting, police stated they believed local community members were assisting Freeman in avoiding capture, and set up a site in the nearby town of Bright where members of the public could leave tips. They also offered Freeman a plan for his surrender, although criminology academic Liam Gillespie stated it was unlikely to be accepted due to Freeman's sovereign citizen beliefs. Other theories put forward included that he had killed himself, or was alive outside the Mount Buffalo area. If he was inside the area, it was speculated he may be hiding in a cave, hut, or mineshaft that he may have prepared in the event of an emergency. As of 20 September, police were skeptical that he had left Victoria. In early October, cadaver dogs from the Queensland Police Service began searching for Freeman.

On 6 October, Freeman's brother theorised that Freeman had perished days before on a mountain near his own residence.

On 14 October, Parks Victoria reopened parts of the Mount Buffalo National Park to the public. Police asked park users who had trail cameras in the park to check their cameras for any recordings of Freeman.

On 24 October, Parks Victoria fully reopened the Mount Buffalo National Park to the public. On the same day, Victoria Police said they had now received "1700 pieces of intelligence" which included tips from members of the public and that they would form a new taskforce called Taskforce Summit to continue the search for Freeman.

On 9 November, police fired dozens of shots into bushland surrounding Mount Buffalo in a renewed effort to locate Freeman. They attempted to replicate and analyse the echoes of gunfire reported on the day of the shootings.

In the first week of December, police spent five days searching 88.6 hectares of the Mount Buffalo National Park for Freeman's body with the assistance of two New South Wales Police Force cadaver dogs. The area had earlier been searched on 12 September by police tactical officers when they were acting on the assumption that he was alive.

On 2 February 2026, Victoria Police announced that investigators did not believe Freeman was alive. Commencing on 2 February, over 100 police and volunteers conducted a five-day search of the Mount Buffalo National Park for Freeman including using two NSW Police Force cadaver dogs. The search failed to locate Freeman or any of his weapons.

== Death of Freeman ==
Thologolong is indicated by the blue marker. The location of Freeman's property near Porepunkah is indicated by the red marker.

On 30 March 2026, at approximately 8:30 am, Freeman was shot and killed by Victoria Police at a rural property in Thologolong near Walwa in north-east Victoria, about 150 km northeast of Porepunkah, following a seven-month manhunt. The deceased was formally identified as Freeman on 1 April.

The operation that led to Freeman's death commenced at about 5:30 am. Police had been tipped-off regarding his whereabouts days earlier and had begun the operation in hopes of an arrest. After approximately three hours of negotiations, Freeman emerged from a converted shipping container, cloaked in a doona. Freeman was shot multiple times by SOG snipers and killed. Police allege that as he exited, he dropped the doona, revealing a police pistol taken from Neal Thompson's body, and shot at a police negotiator. No police officers were injured.

== Reactions ==
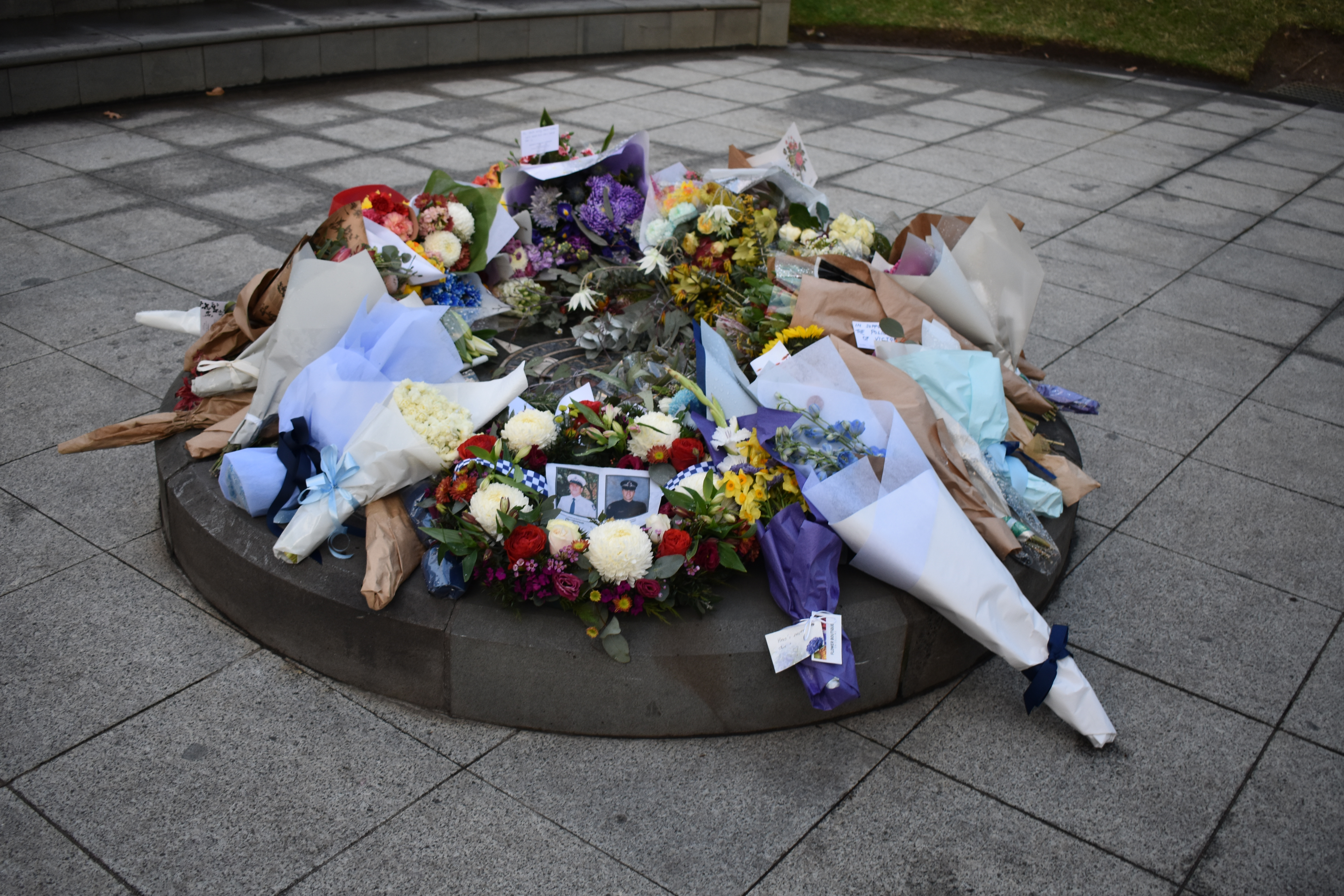
Flowers left in Melbourne, Victoria, in memory of the killed officers.

Senior political and administrative officials including Albanese, Allan and Bush reacted to the shootings, expressing sadness, praising the officers for their bravery, and condemning sovereign citizen beliefs and more broadly what they described as extreme ideological perspectives. Tributes were made to De Waart-Hottart and Thompson across Victoria and Australia, including landmarks lit in blue, a moment of silence in the federal parliament, flags flown at half-mast, and floral tributes left at Wangaratta's police station.

Domestic and international journalists compared the incident with the 2022 Wieambilla shootings, in which a sovereign citizen fatally shot police in a rural community. As the search progressed, Australian media compared the manhunt to that of Malcolm Naden, who from 2005 remained a fugitive in New South Wales for seven years.

Shortly after the shooting, Freeman's actions received little comment from sovereign citizens. An exception came from Mike Holt, an associate of Freeman described by Crikey as "a well-known Australian pseudolegal practitioner", who defended Freeman as fearful for his life and within his rights to shoot people who came on "his property". In the following days and weeks, The Age described Freeman receiving some "sympathetic" comments online, and comparisons with the cultural icon Ned Kelly among "some Romantics". On 1 September in Adelaide, a protestor at a March for Australia rally received media attention after he was seen holding a placard depicting Freeman. He was arrested a few days later and charged with displaying offensive material in a public place. He was released and given an adult caution.

The partner of Freeman, Amalia (Mali) was not charged with obstructing police after the Office of Public Prosecutions found there was insufficient evidence to support a conviction.

=== Porepunkah ===
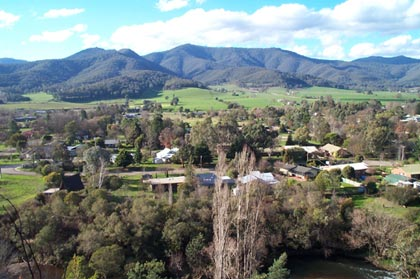
Porepunkah in the early 2000s

In the days after the shooting, media and police descended on Porepunkah. Businesses struggled as the manhunt and warnings against visitation reduced visitor numbers. Tourism is the main industry of the town, particularly skiing and snow sports, and during the search the region experienced heavy snowfall that would usually bring a surge of visitors.

On 15 September, the Victorian Government announced a $2.5 million support package to assist businesses in Porepunkah and the wider Alpine Shire. The Saturday Paper characterised this as a "modest sum", and weeks later businesses reported they had not received compensation nor communication from the government.

Locals interviewed by media expressed hope that Porepunkah would not become infamous for the shootings and instead remain a popular tourism destination. Snowtown's infamy for the 1990s bodies in barrels murders and Leongatha's connection to the 2023 mushroom murders were cited as examples of tragic events redefining the identity of communities.

By October, The Australian reported there was strong local support for the police, although some community members in Bright and Porepunkah were "angry" with the continued conspicuous police presence in the towns.

== Coronial inquests ==
A coronial inquest into the deaths of Thompson and De Waart-Hottart opened in the Coroners Court of Victoria with a directions hearing on 25 May 2026, alongside a separate but related inquest into Freeman's death.

Regarding Freeman's death at Thologolong, the Court heard that none of the SOG officers involved were wearing body cameras, and that footage of the confrontation came from an overhead police helicopter. Audio was recovered from Freeman's mobile phone, which he had set up to record. Ballistics evidence involved an ammunition count: 12 rounds remained in Freeman's gun, one was fired at Porepunkah, another fired at Thologolong, and another round unaccounted for. A spare magazine Freeman had taken from De Waart-Hottart's body was recovered unused.

The inquest brief is scheduled to be released by 30 October 2026, and the inquest is likely to be held around March 2027.

== See also ==
- List of mass shootings in Australia
- Wieambilla police shootings
