= Biggara =

- Town
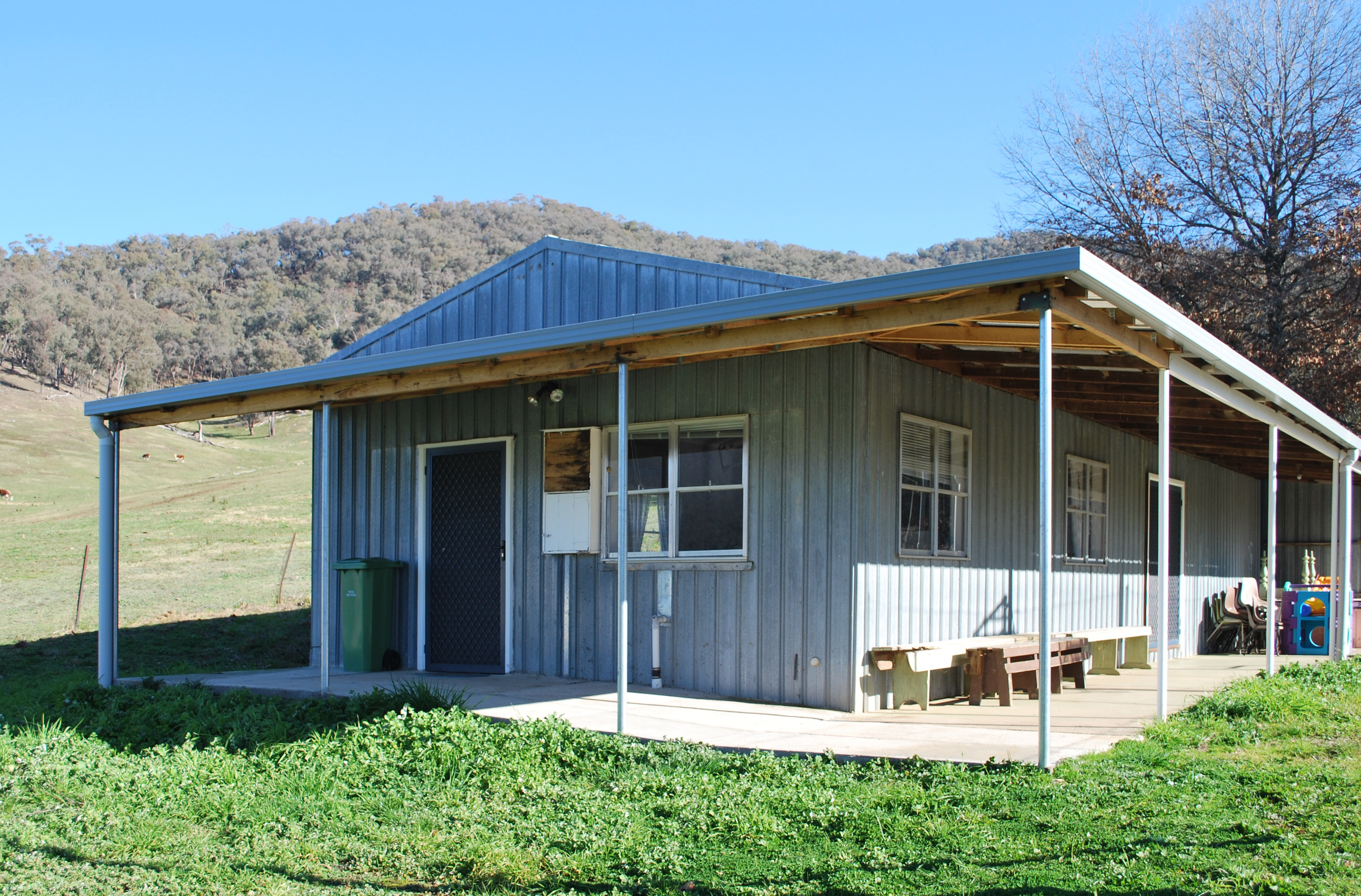
- Community Centre, Biggara

- Coordinates: 36°16′50″S 148°01′35″E
- Country: Australia
- State: Victoria
- Region: Hume
- LGA: Shire of Towong
- Location: 470 km (290 mi) NE of Melbourne; 148 km (92 mi) E of Wodonga; 26 km (16 mi) SE of Corryong

Government
  - State electorate: Benambra
  - Federal division: Indi

Population
  - Total: 49 (2016 census)
- Postcode: 3707

Biggara is a locality in north east Victoria, Australia. The locality is in Towong Shire and on the Murray River, 470 kilometres (290 mi) north east of the state capital, Melbourne.

At the 2016 census, Biggara had a population of 49.
