= Thologolong =

- Town
- Coordinates: 35°59′27″S 147°25′41″E
- Country: Australia
- State: Victoria
- Region: Hume
- LGA: Shire of Towong

Government
  - State electorate: Benambra
  - Federal division: Indi

Population
  - Total: 22 (2021 census)
- Postcode: 3691

Thologolong is a locality in the Shire of Towong, Victoria, Australia. At the 2021 census, the Thologolong population was 22.

== History ==
On 30 March 2026, at approximately 8:30 am, Dezi Freeman, the alleged perpetrator of the Porepunkah police shootings, was shot and killed by Victoria Police at a rural property in Thologolong near Walwa in north-east Victoria, about 150 km (93 mi) northeast of Porepunkah, following a seven-month manhunt.

== Heritage listings ==
Thologolong has one heritage-listed site, the Thologolong Homestead, which was added to Victorian Heritage Register on 9 September 1999.

== Population ==
According to the 2021 Census, the population of Thologolong was 22, of which the median age of persons in the locality was 60 years. There were more males than females, with 52.9% of the population male and 47.1% female. The average household size was 2.3 people per household.

== Transport ==
Thologolong is mainly accessed via the Murray Valley Highway, with its eastern end running through it and was re-aligned to run along the more-direct, present-day route to Corryong in June 1990.
