= Berringama =

- Town
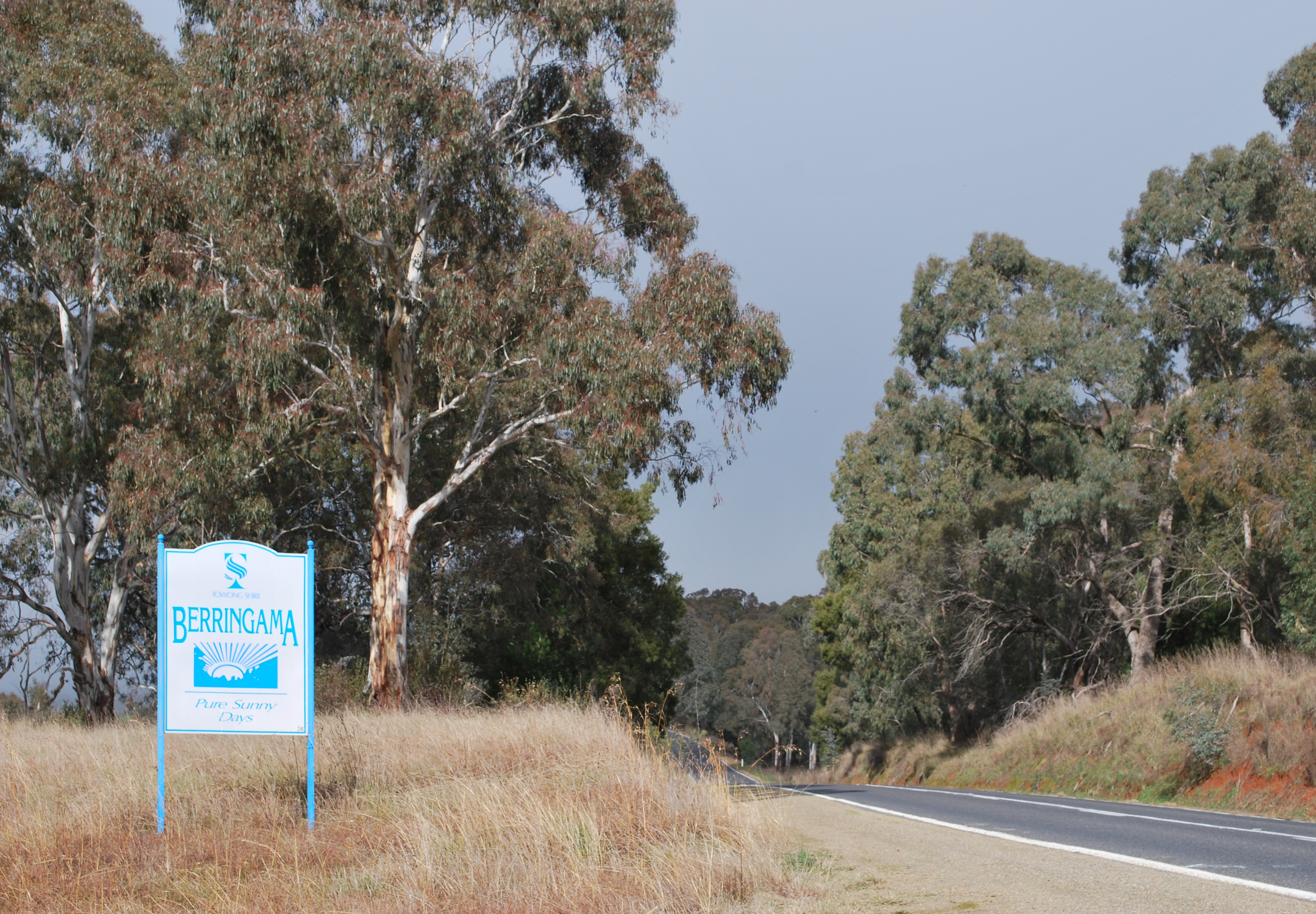
- Entering Berringama along the Murray Valley Highway

- Coordinates: 36°13′02″S 147°39′10″E
- Country: Australia
- State: Victoria
- Region: Hume
- LGA: Shire of Towong
- Location: 418 km (260 mi) NE of Melbourne; 95 km (59 mi) E of Wodonga; 27 km (17 mi) E of Corryong

Government
  - State electorate: Benambra
  - Federal division: Indi

Population
  - Total: 37 (2016 census)
- Postcode: 3691

Berringama is a locality in north east Victoria, Australia. The locality is in the Shire of Towong local government area, 418 kilometres (260 mi) north east of the state capital, Melbourne.

At the 2016 census, Berringama had a population of 37.
