= Dartmouth, Victoria =

Dartmouth
- Town
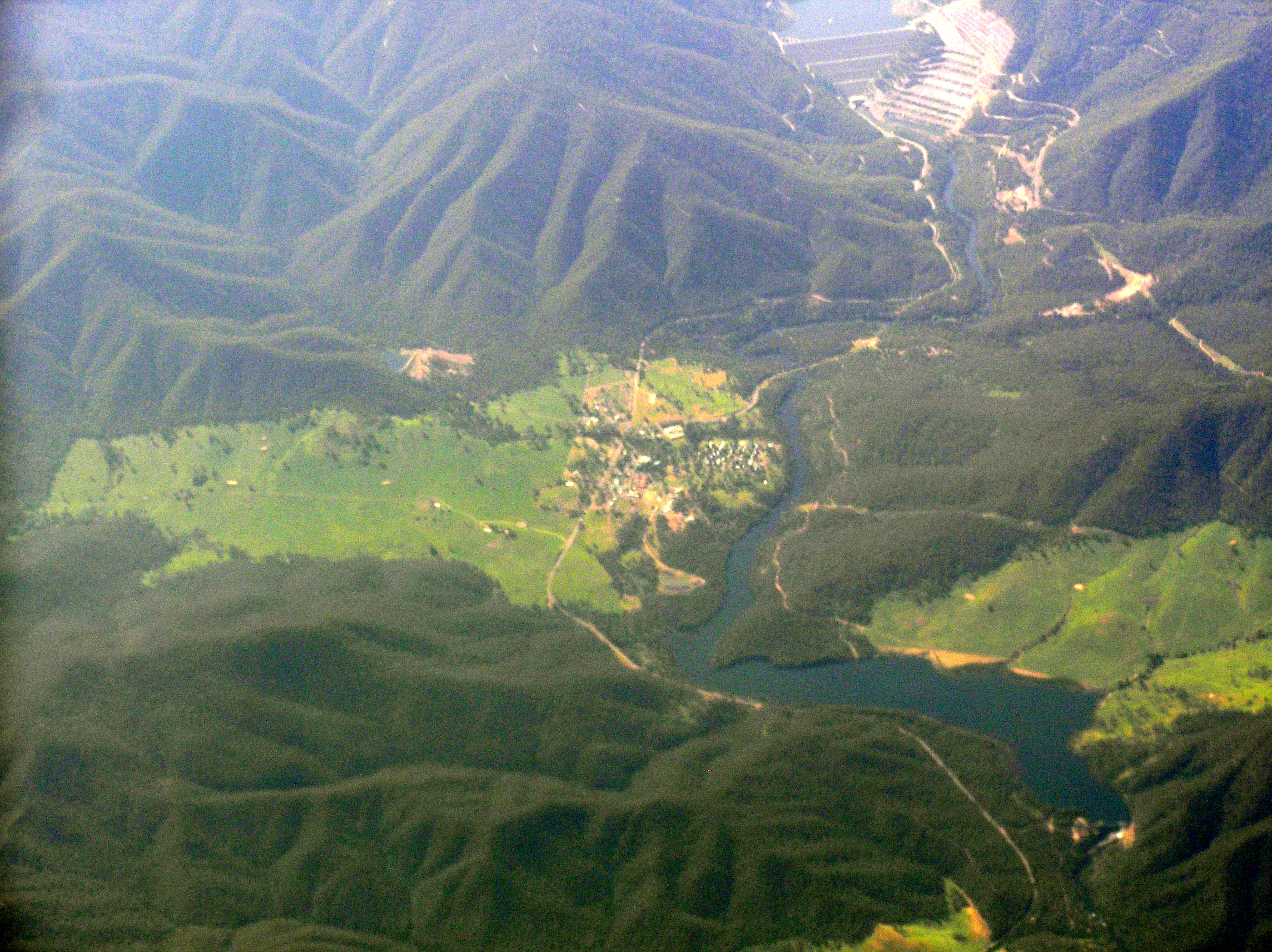
- Aerial of the town

- Coordinates: 36°32′S 147°29′E
- Country: Australia
- State: Victoria
- Region: Hume
- LGA: Shire of Towong
- Location: 455 km (283 mi) NE of Melbourne; 156 km (97 mi) SE of Wodonga; 52 km (32 mi) N of Omeo

Government
  - State electorate: Benambra
  - Federal division: Indi
- Elevation: 365 m (1,198 ft)

Population
  - Total: 104 (2016 census)
- Postcode: 3701
- Mean max temp: 20.6 °C (69.1 °F)
- Mean min temp: 7.7 °C (45.9 °F)
- Annual rainfall: 1,006.2 mm (39.61 in)

Dartmouth is a town in Victoria, Australia.

It was established in 1973 as a construction camp for workers working on the Dartmouth Dam and the Post Office opened on 1 March 1973. (An earlier Post Office had existed in the rural locality from 1910 until 1930).

The dam was built very close to the mouth of the Dart River where it joined the Mitta Mitta River and is a major reservoir in the Murray-Darling River system, on the Mitta Mitta River. Today Dartmouth is a village with a permanent population around 45 people. It caters to fisherman, tourists and local workers who maintain the dam and the now two power stations.

While the dam was being built by the State Rivers & Water Supply Commission, the population was around 2,000, many of those people were employed by Thiess Brothers.

== Climate ==
Climate data are sourced just outside the town on Horsfall Rd, at an elevation of 370 metres (1,210 ft). Rainfall records began in 1918. Temperature records began in 1975. Winter is twice as wet as summer, and occasionally it may snow.

Climate data for Dartmouth Reservoir (1975–2022, rainfall to 1918); 370 m AMSL; 36.54° S, 147.50° E
| Month | Jan | Feb | Mar | Apr | May | Jun | Jul | Aug | Sep | Oct | Nov | Dec | Year |
|---|---|---|---|---|---|---|---|---|---|---|---|---|---|
| Record high °C (°F) | 42.2 (108.0) | 43.0 (109.4) | 39.0 (102.2) | 33.4 (92.1) | 24.7 (76.5) | 20.0 (68.0) | 19.6 (67.3) | 27.2 (81.0) | 28.4 (83.1) | 33.2 (91.8) | 37.9 (100.2) | 39.2 (102.6) | 43.0 (109.4) |
| Mean daily maximum °C (°F) | 29.5 (85.1) | 29.0 (84.2) | 25.8 (78.4) | 20.7 (69.3) | 15.9 (60.6) | 12.5 (54.5) | 11.8 (53.2) | 13.4 (56.1) | 16.6 (61.9) | 20.5 (68.9) | 24.0 (75.2) | 26.9 (80.4) | 20.6 (69.0) |
| Mean daily minimum °C (°F) | 14.0 (57.2) | 13.7 (56.7) | 11.1 (52.0) | 7.3 (45.1) | 4.7 (40.5) | 3.1 (37.6) | 2.3 (36.1) | 2.8 (37.0) | 4.6 (40.3) | 7.0 (44.6) | 9.9 (49.8) | 11.8 (53.2) | 7.7 (45.8) |
| Record low °C (°F) | 2.8 (37.0) | 2.3 (36.1) | 1.9 (35.4) | −1.6 (29.1) | −3.5 (25.7) | −5.0 (23.0) | −5.4 (22.3) | −5.0 (23.0) | −3.7 (25.3) | −1.5 (29.3) | −0.2 (31.6) | 1.4 (34.5) | −5.4 (22.3) |
| Average precipitation mm (inches) | 65.1 (2.56) | 55.6 (2.19) | 61.2 (2.41) | 57.9 (2.28) | 85.8 (3.38) | 100.6 (3.96) | 111.3 (4.38) | 121.4 (4.78) | 102.5 (4.04) | 97.4 (3.83) | 71.8 (2.83) | 73.9 (2.91) | 1,006.2 (39.61) |
| Average precipitation days (≥ 0.2 mm) | 6.3 | 5.9 | 6.7 | 7.7 | 10.5 | 12.5 | 14.8 | 14.6 | 12.9 | 11.0 | 8.8 | 7.6 | 119.3 |
Source: Australian Bureau of Meteorology; Dartmouth Reservoir
