= Towong =

- Town
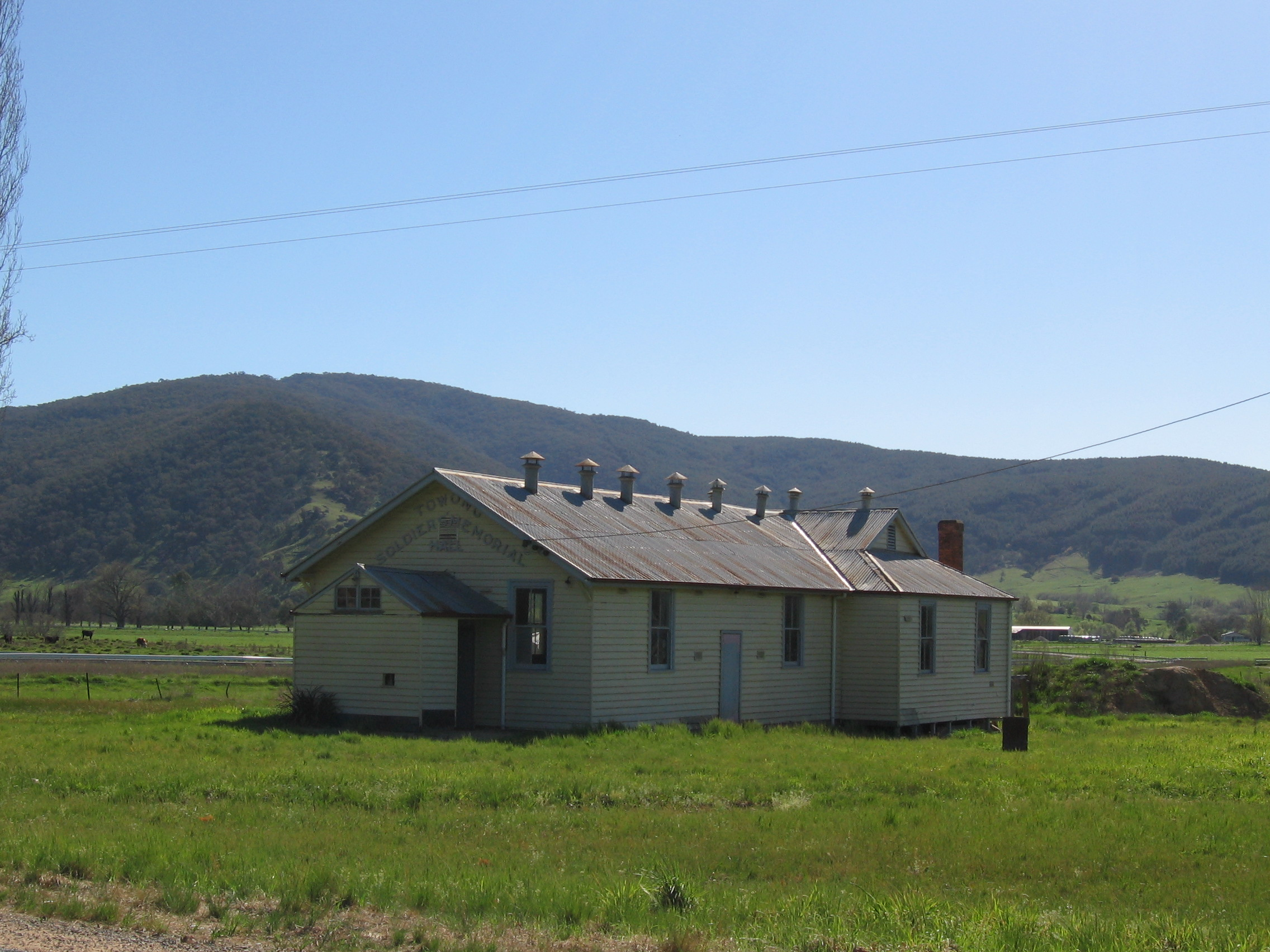
- Towong Memorial Hall

- Coordinates: 36°07′34″S 147°59′13″E
- Country: Australia
- State: Victoria
- Region: Hume
- LGA: Shire of Towong

Government
  - State electorate: Benambra
  - Federal division: Indi

Population
  - Total: 132 (2016 census)
- Postcode: 3707

Towong is a locality of the Shire of Towong local government area in Victoria, Australia. Towong is on the Murray River close to Corryong.

== History ==
Towong Post Office opened on 10 January 1882 and closed in 1994.

The existing timber bridge across the Murray River at Towong was built in 1938. Work on a new bridge is scheduled to begin in 2022.

== Towong Turf Club ==
Towong is home to the historic Towong Turf Club, hosting thoroughbred horse racing since 1871. Currently Country Racing Victoria schedules two race meetings per year at the venue, the Towong Cup meeting (traditionally held in early March) and the Squizzy Taylor Dash meeting (traditionally held in late December).
