= Bullioh =

- Town
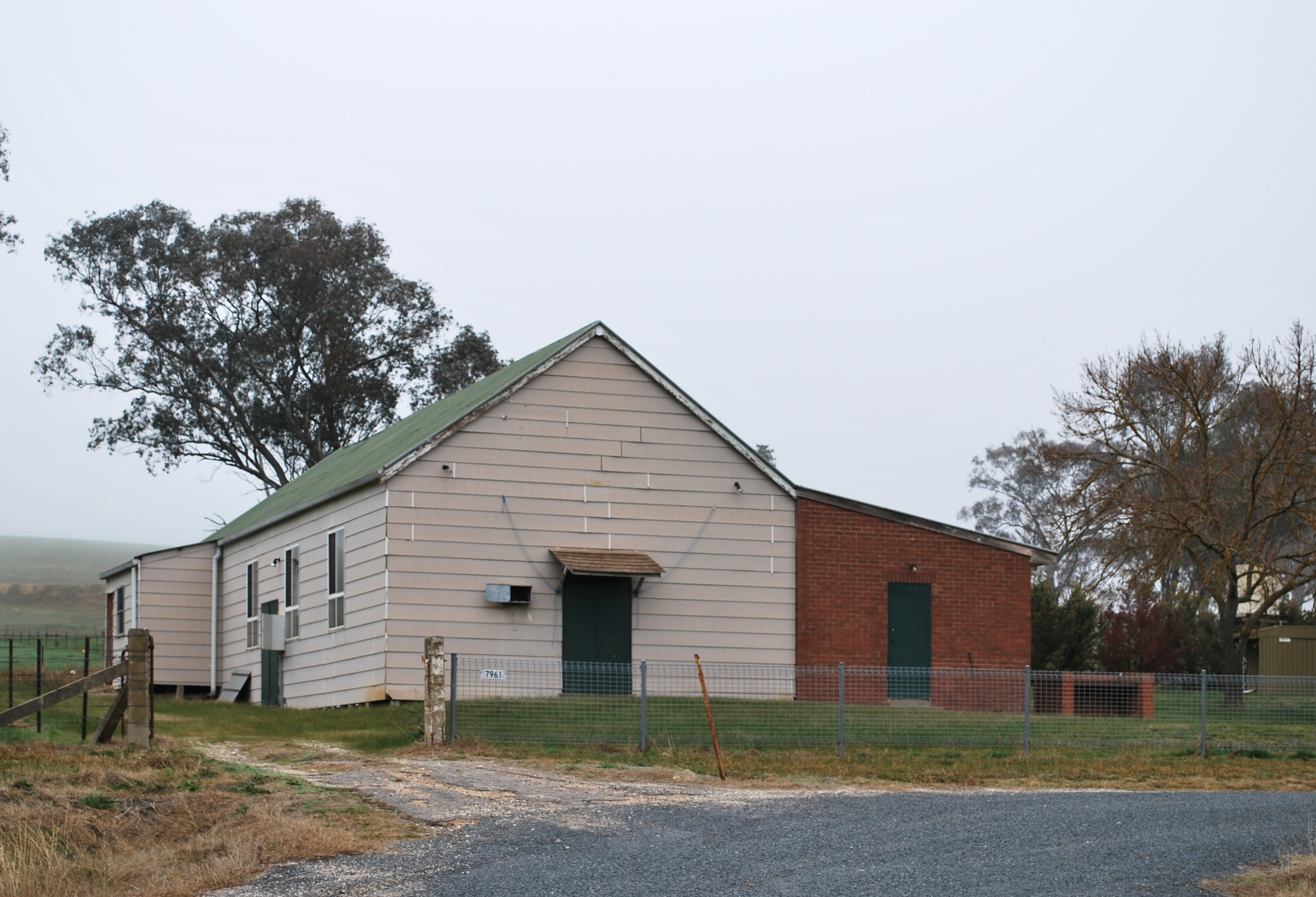
- Public hall at Bullioh, 2010

- Coordinates: 36°11′40″S 147°19′54″E
- Country: Australia
- State: Victoria
- Region: Hume
- LGA: Shire of Towong
- Location: 378 km (235 mi) NE of Melbourne; 56 km (35 mi) E of Wodonga; 10 km (6.2 mi) E of Tallangatta

Government
  - State electorate: Benambra
  - Federal division: Indi

Population
  - Total: 75 (2016 census)
- Postcode: 3700

Bullioh is a locality in north east Victoria, Australia. The locality is in the Shire of Towong local government area, 378 kilometres (235 mi) north east of the state capital, Melbourne.

At the 2016 census, Bullioh had a population of 75.
