= Mount Lawson State Park =

- IUCN category II (national park)
- Location within Victoria
- Location: Victoria
- Nearest city: Wodonga
- Coordinates: 36.0922°S 147.4444°E
- Area: 131.5 km^{2} (50.8 sq mi)
- Established: 1988
- Governing body: Parks Victoria
- Website: Official website

Mount Lawson State Park is a 13,150-hectare (32,500-acre) park situated approximately 60 km east of Wodonga in the state of Victoria, Australia. It was protected for its diverse vegetation, rare flora and fauna, aesthetic qualities and cultural heritage.

== See also ==
- Protected areas of Victoria
