= Tintaldra =

- Town
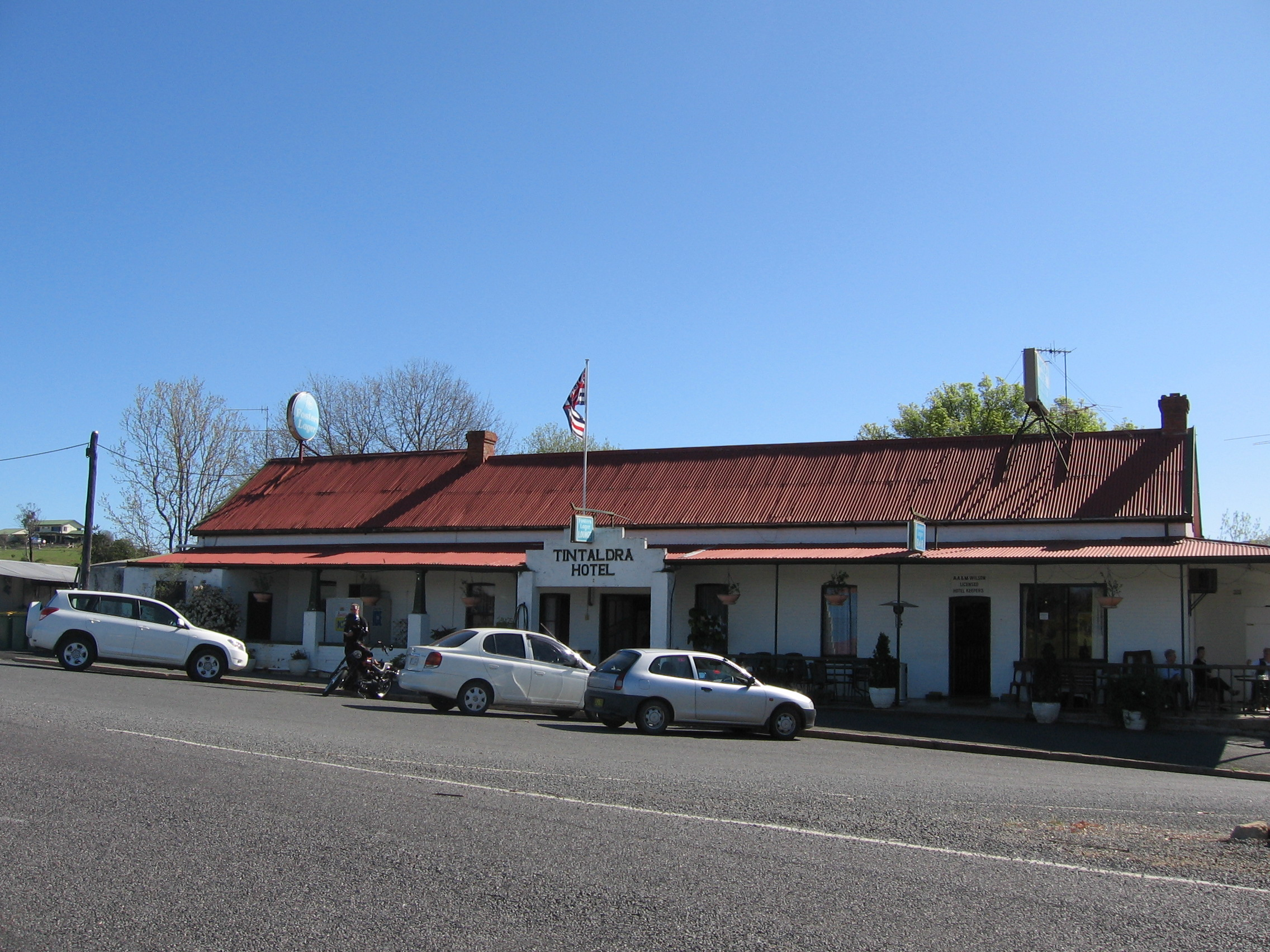
- The Tintaldra Hotel, with the Murray River flag flying

- Coordinates: 36°02′S 147°55′E
- Country: Australia
- State: Victoria
- Region: Hume
- LGA: Shire of Towong
- Location: 440 km (270 mi) NE of Melbourne; 131 km (81 mi) E of Wodonga; 24 km (15 mi) N of Corryong

Government
  - State electorate: Benambra
  - Federal division: Indi

Population
  - Total: 66 (2021 census)
- Postcode: 3708

Tintaldra /ˈtɪntəldrə/ is a town in northeast Victoria, Australia in the Shire of Towong local government area and on the upper reaches of the Murray River, 440 kilometres (270 mi) northeast of the state capital, Melbourne and 131 kilometres (81 mi) east of the regional centre of Wodonga. At the 2021 census, Tintaldra and the surrounding area had a population of 66.

== History ==
The first people of the area were the Ngarigo and the Walgalu.

European settlement began in the Tintaldra in 1837 with the arrival of squatters looking for fresh grass and water for cattle. The town began to form around 1854 as unlucky prospectors began to look for land to farm, though of insufficient size to justify a Post Office until 1 January 1867.

Its location as a crossing point over the Murray River and its associated customs house led to a boom period in the late 19th century. Federation and the development of other river crossings into New South Wales led to a slow decline. Soldier settlers moved to the area after World War I. Much of Tintaldra was burnt to the ground in the Black Friday bushfires of 13 January 1939.

== Today ==
Tintaldra's economy is based around agriculture and tourism. The Tintaldra store, constructed in 1864 with rough hewn river red gum beams and rafters and walls made from vertical slats of stringybark timber, is still standing today. Nearby Burrowa-Pine Mountain National Park is a popular place for bushwalking and camping.

== Upper Murray Football League ==
The town had an Australian rules football team involved with the Upper Murray Football League. Tintaldra first played from 1912 to 1913. After this first unsuccessful run they re-joined in 1951. The club expanded in 1962 to include Khancoban, NSW and was renamed Tintaldra-Khancoban United FC. Two club footballers won the Upper Murray Football League senior football best and fairest award in 1963 - Merv Clarke and in 1965 - C Pagononi.

Former player, Wennie Van Lint went onto play senior VFL football with South Melbourne in 1967.

The club officially went into recess at the end of the 1967 season.

== Gallery ==
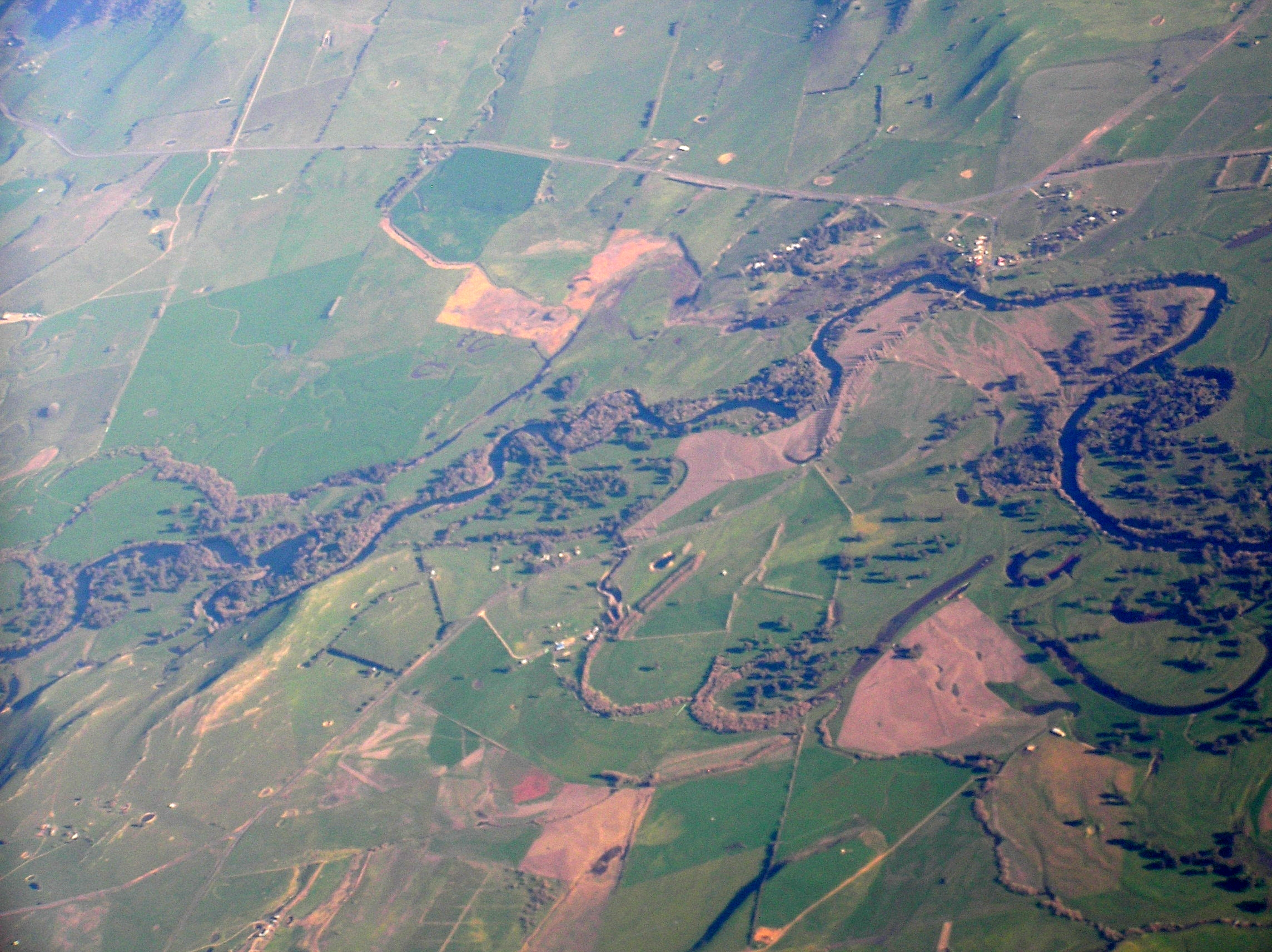
Aerial view from the northwest

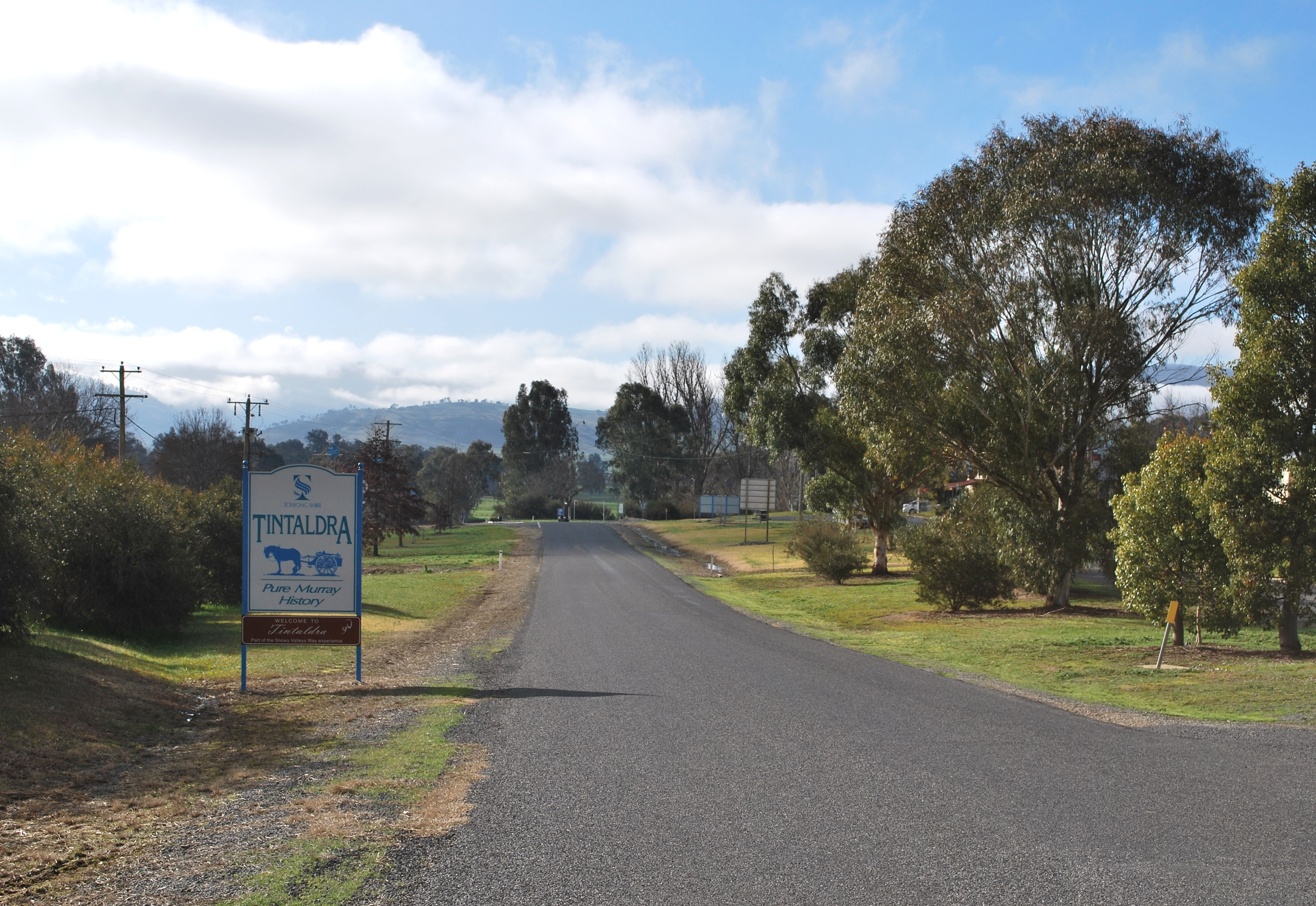
Entering Tintaldra

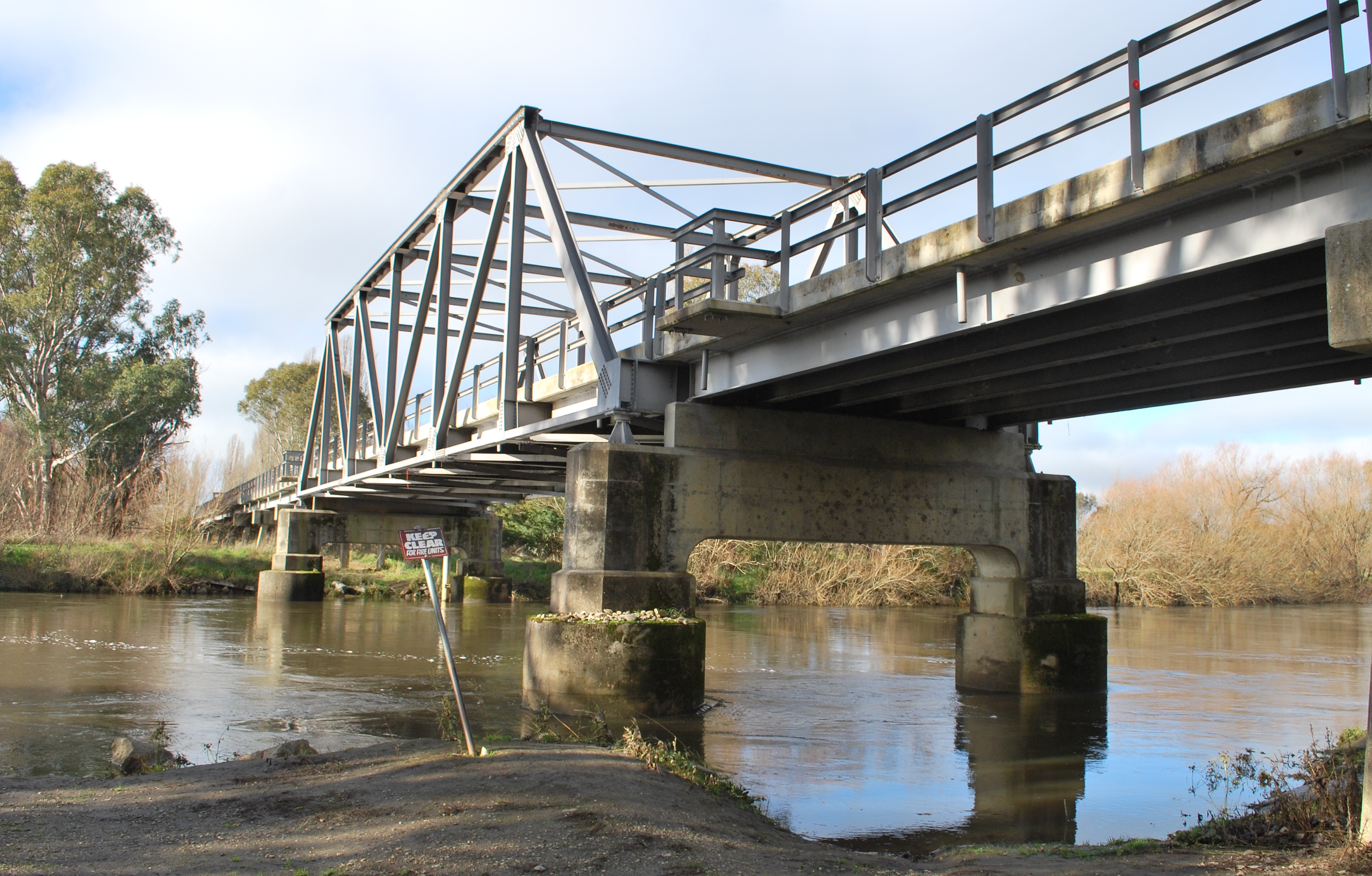
Tintaldra Bridge

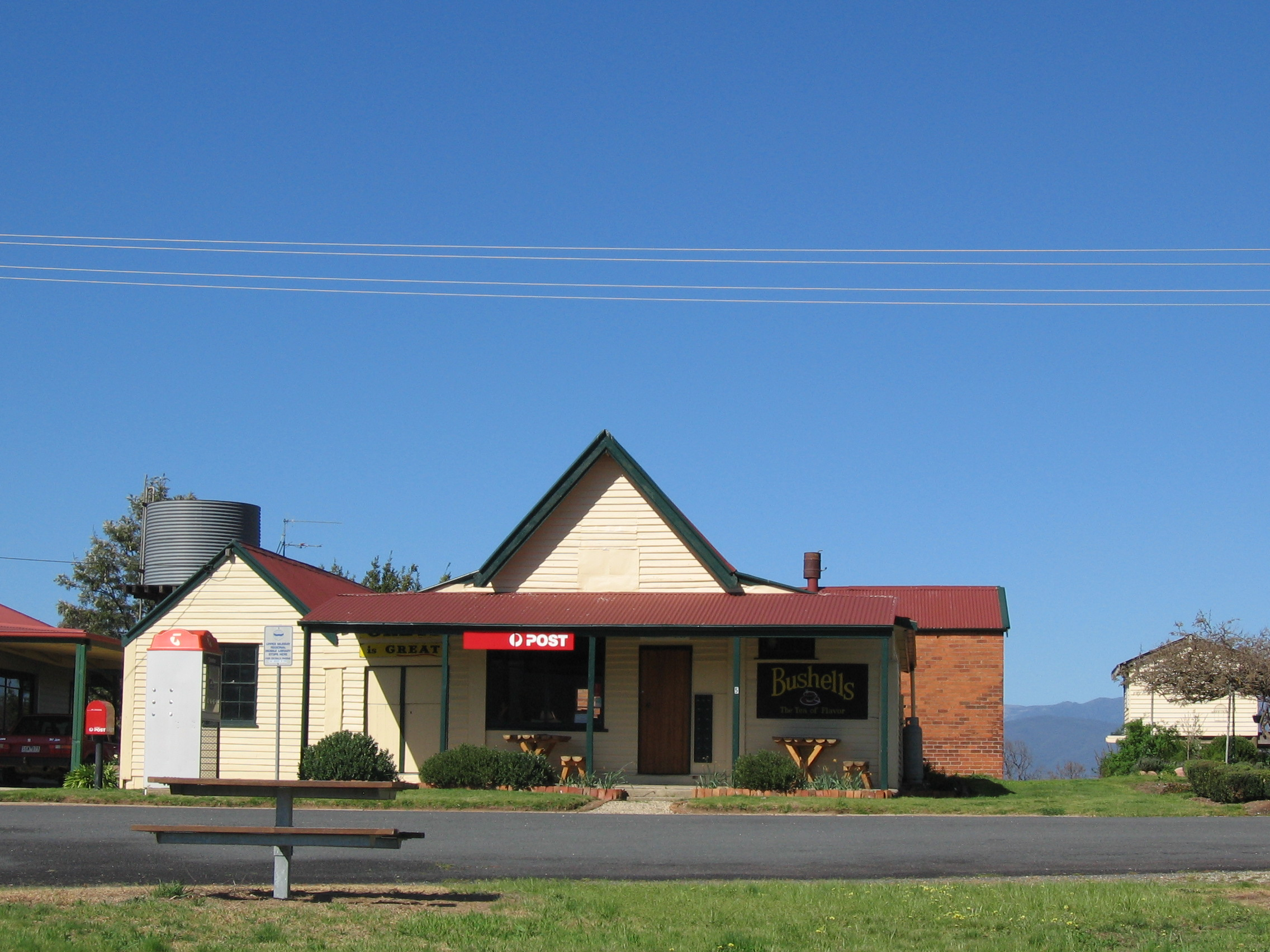
Post office/tearooms

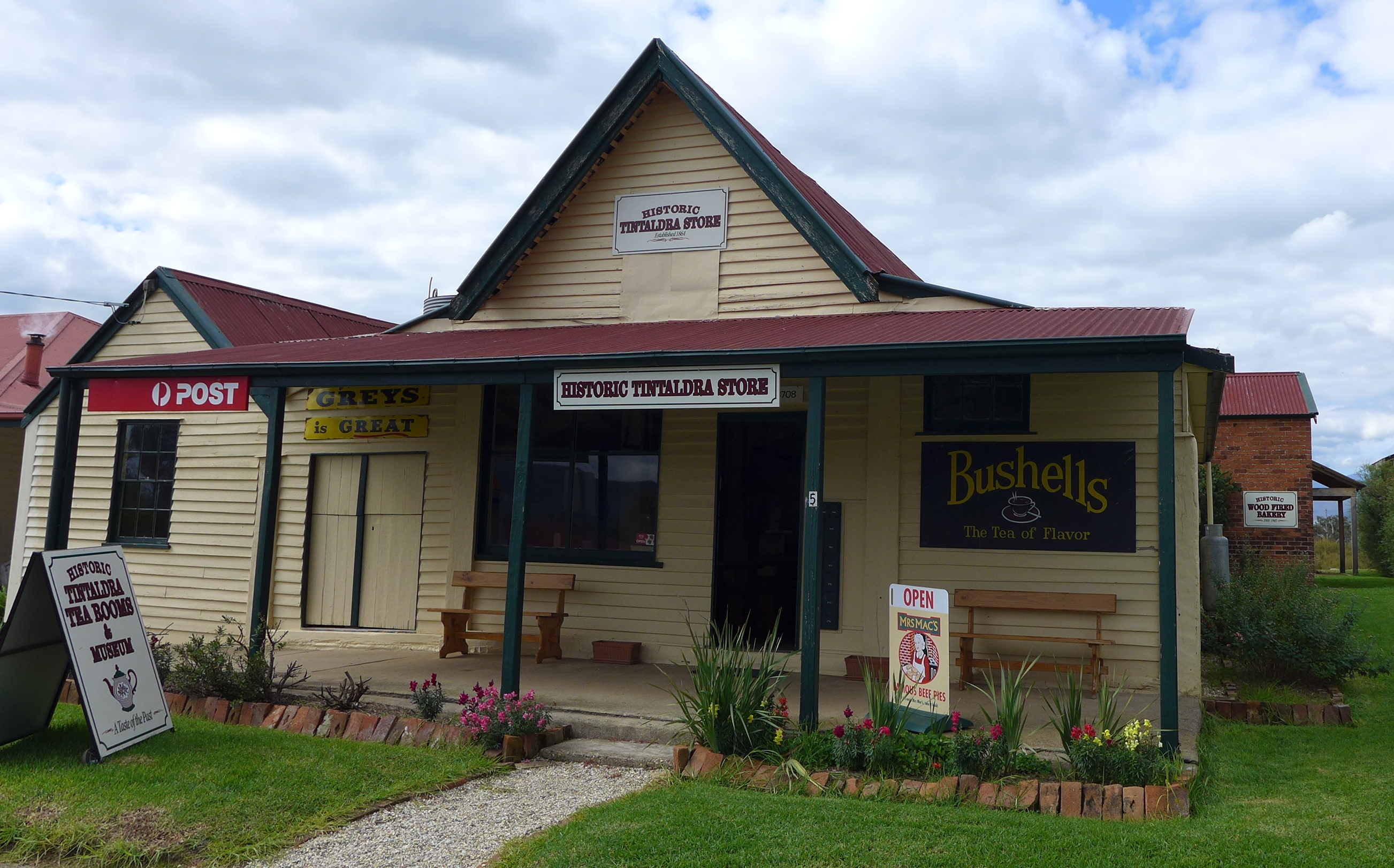
Closeup of post office/tearooms

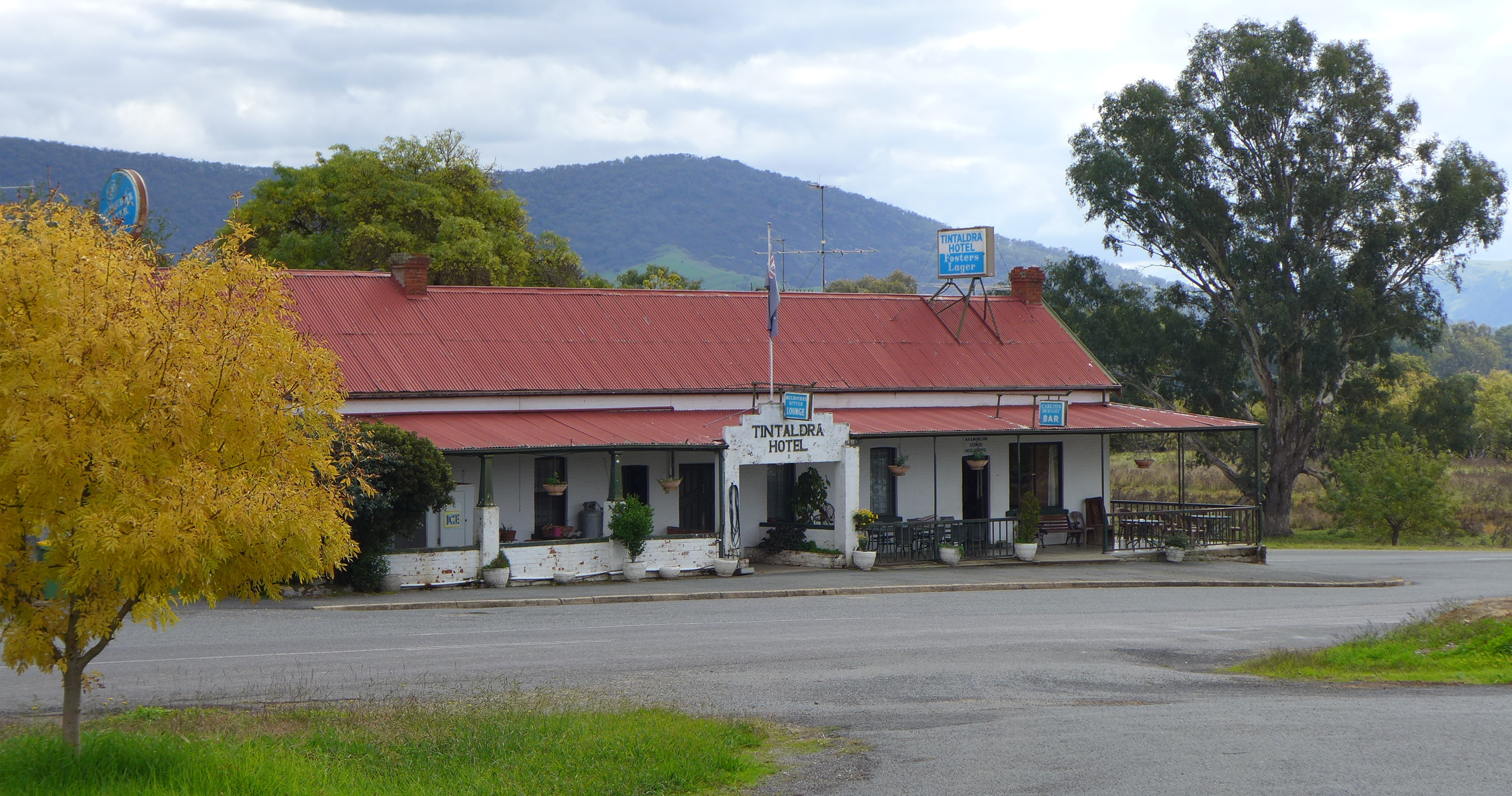
Tintaldra pub

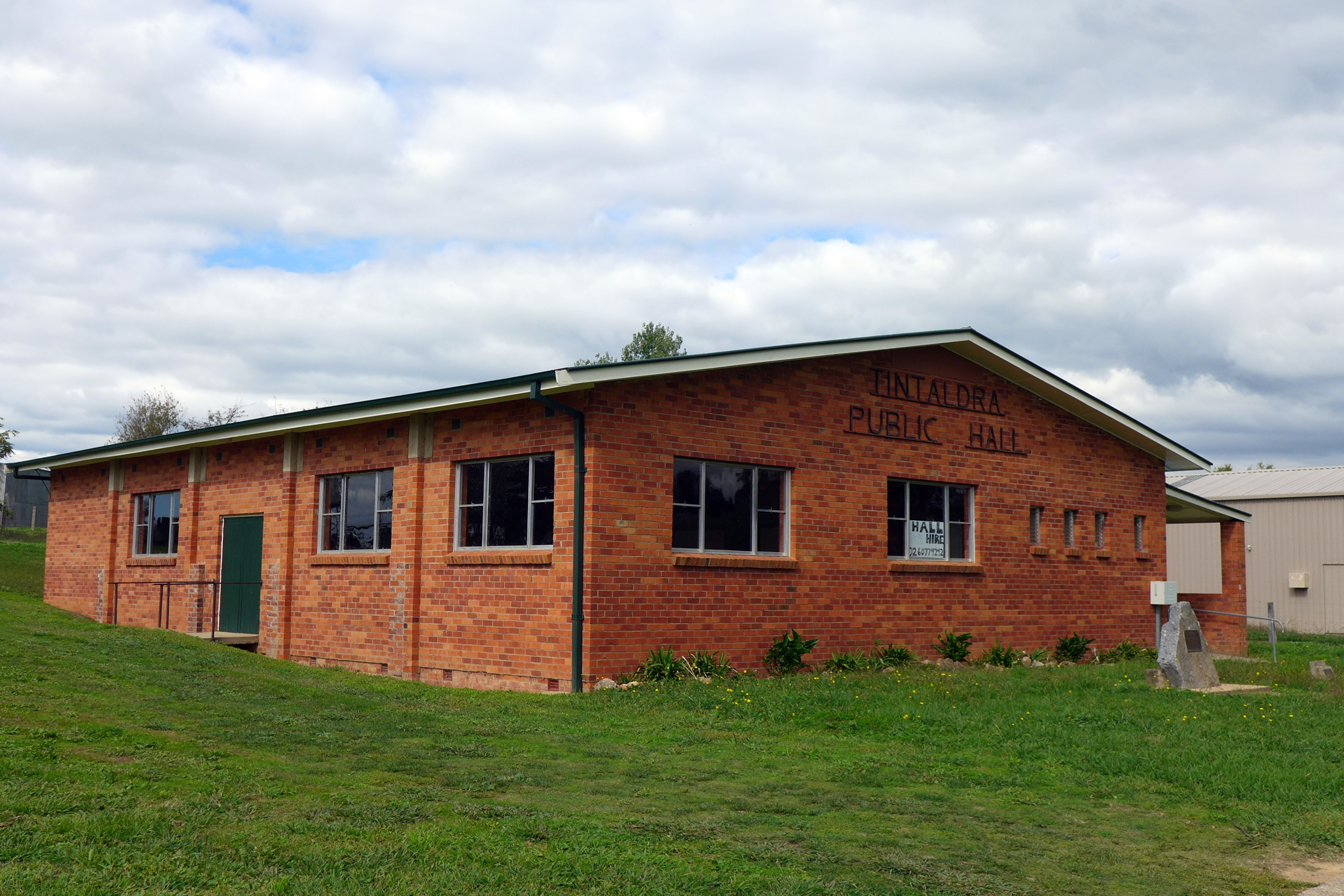
Tintaldra memorial hall

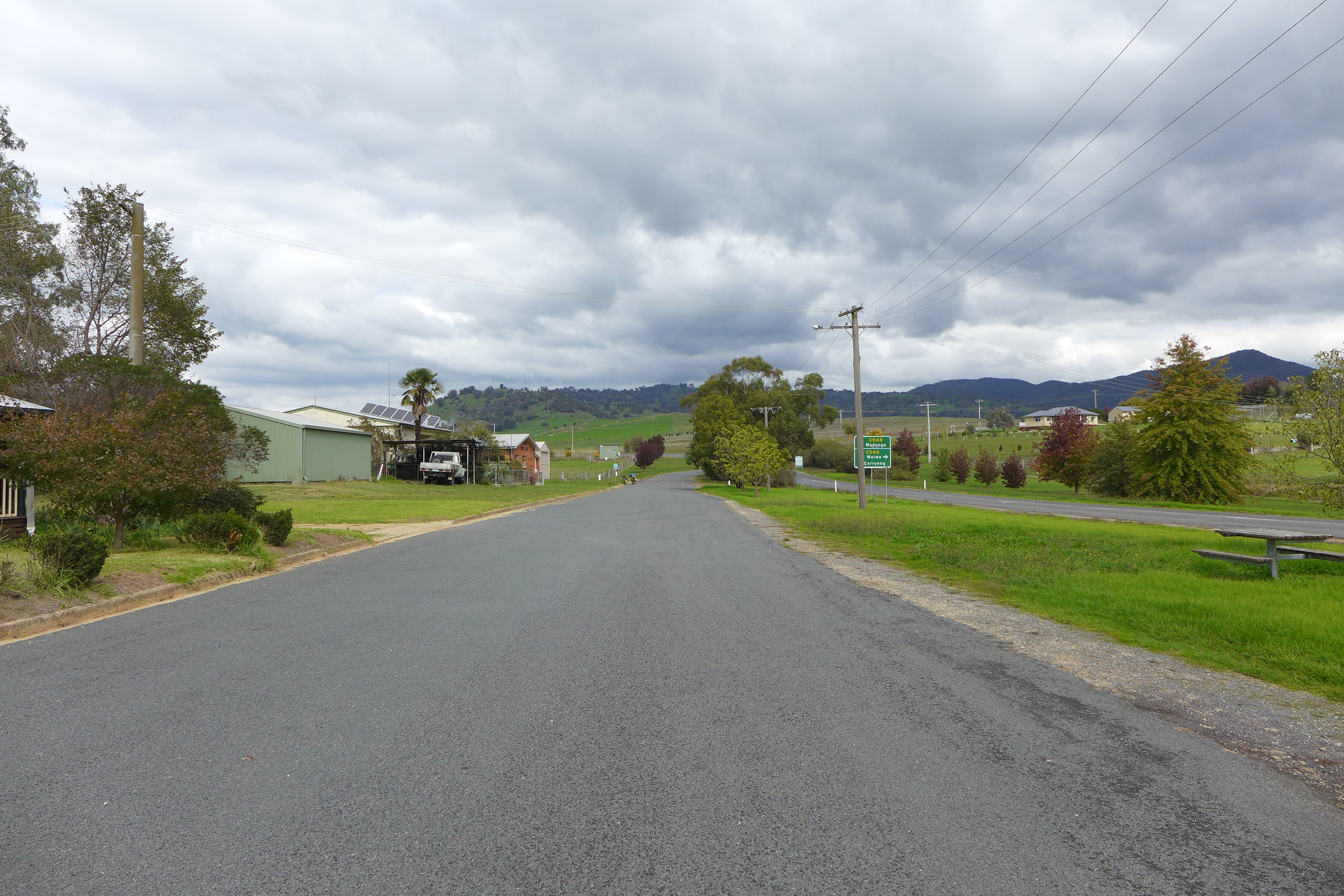
View out of Tintaldra

== See also ==
- Murray River crossings
- Murray River Flag
