= Cudgewa =

- Town
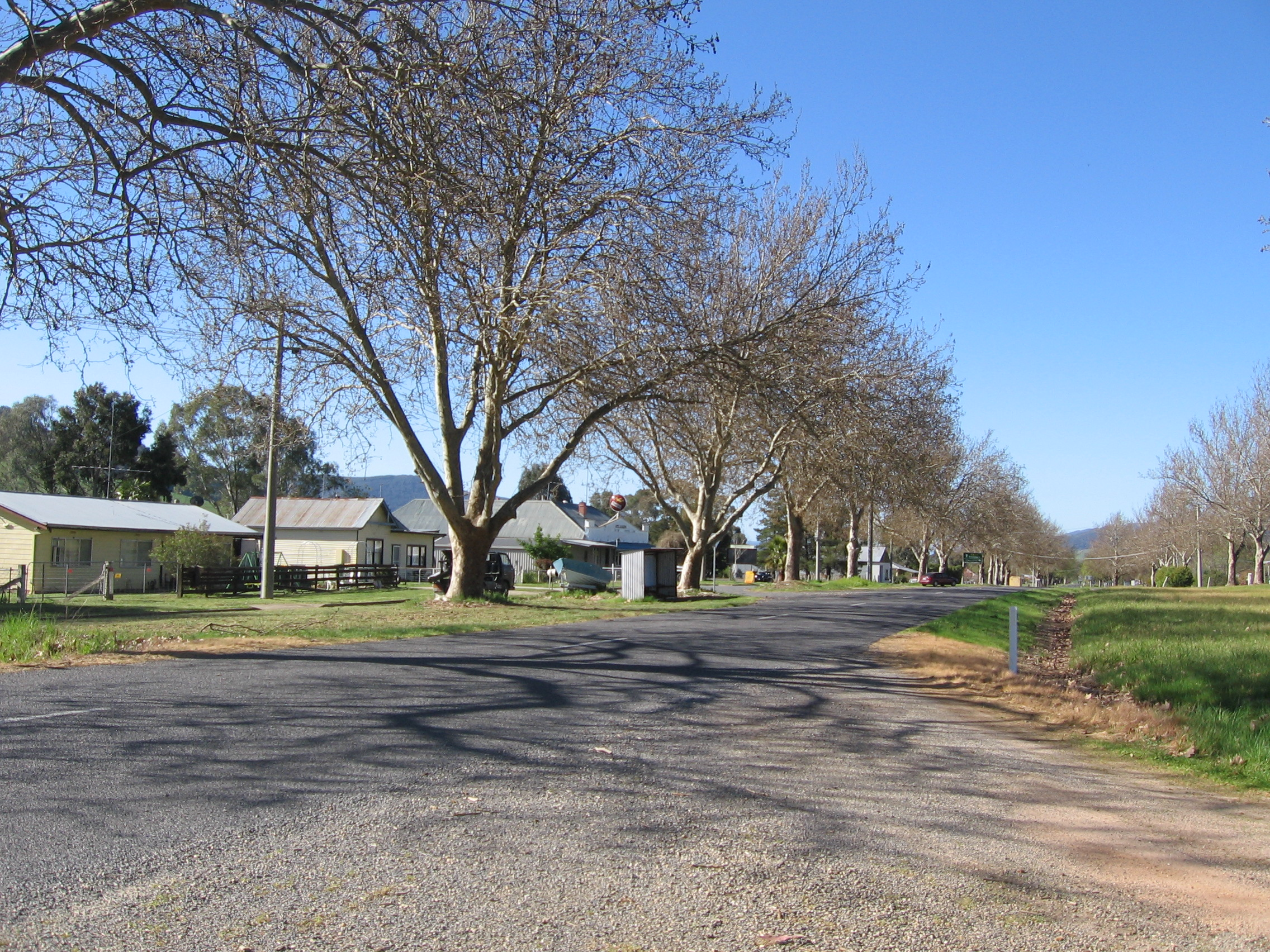
- The main street of Cudgewa

- Interactive map of Cudgewa
- Coordinates: 36°11′30″S 147°46′20″E
- Country: Australia
- State: Victoria
- Region: Hume
- LGA: Shire of Towong
- Location: 429 km (267 mi) NE of Melbourne; 108 km (67 mi) E of Wodonga; 14 km (8.7 mi) W of Corryong

Government
  - State electorate: Benambra
  - Federal division: Indi

Population
  - Total: 261 (2016 census)
- Postcode: 3705

Cudgewa is a small town in the Australian state of Victoria. The town is located adjacent to the Murray Valley Highway, 429 kilometres (267 mi) north east of the state capital, Melbourne. Part of the Shire of Towong local government area, at the 2006 census Cudgewa and the surrounding district had a population of 237.

Burrowa-Pine Mountain National Park and Mount Mitta Mitta Regional Park are close to the town.

== Pre-colonial History ==
The Victorian side of the Upper Murray area was part of the traditional country of the Wolgal People. After the arrival of Europeans to Australia, around 1863, up to two hundred First Nation people were visiting the area, accompanied by almost as many dogs, hunting along Boundary Creek and Cudgewa Creek before moving on . First Nation people of this area had excellent engineering skills that was shown in their erection of fish traps on Cudgewa Creek and other local streams. Unfortunately at the time, "this constructions were too often credited to 'chance', instead of being identified as man-made structures erected according to strict laws which have evolved, within the various tribes, over period of centuries'(we now know it is over periods of millennia), as written by Jean Carmody in her 'Early days of the Upper Murray'.

== Colonial History ==
Cudgewa Post Office opened on 2 June 1879. A Cudgewa North Post Office was open for periods between 1906 and 1930.

The township was the last railway station on the Cudgewa railway line. The station was opened on Thursday, 5 May 1921 and closed on Sunday, 1 March 1981.

The town also had a tennis team.

== Upper Murray Football League ==
The town has a football team involved with the Upper Murray Football League, an Australian Rules Football competition which began in 1893. Cudgewa Blues played its first season in 1893 and is one of three foundation clubs. Over the many years the club has produced many premiership winning teams most recently the back to back flags of 1999 and 2000. The club also uses the same jumpers as the Carlton FC.
