= Walwa, Victoria =

Walwa
- Town
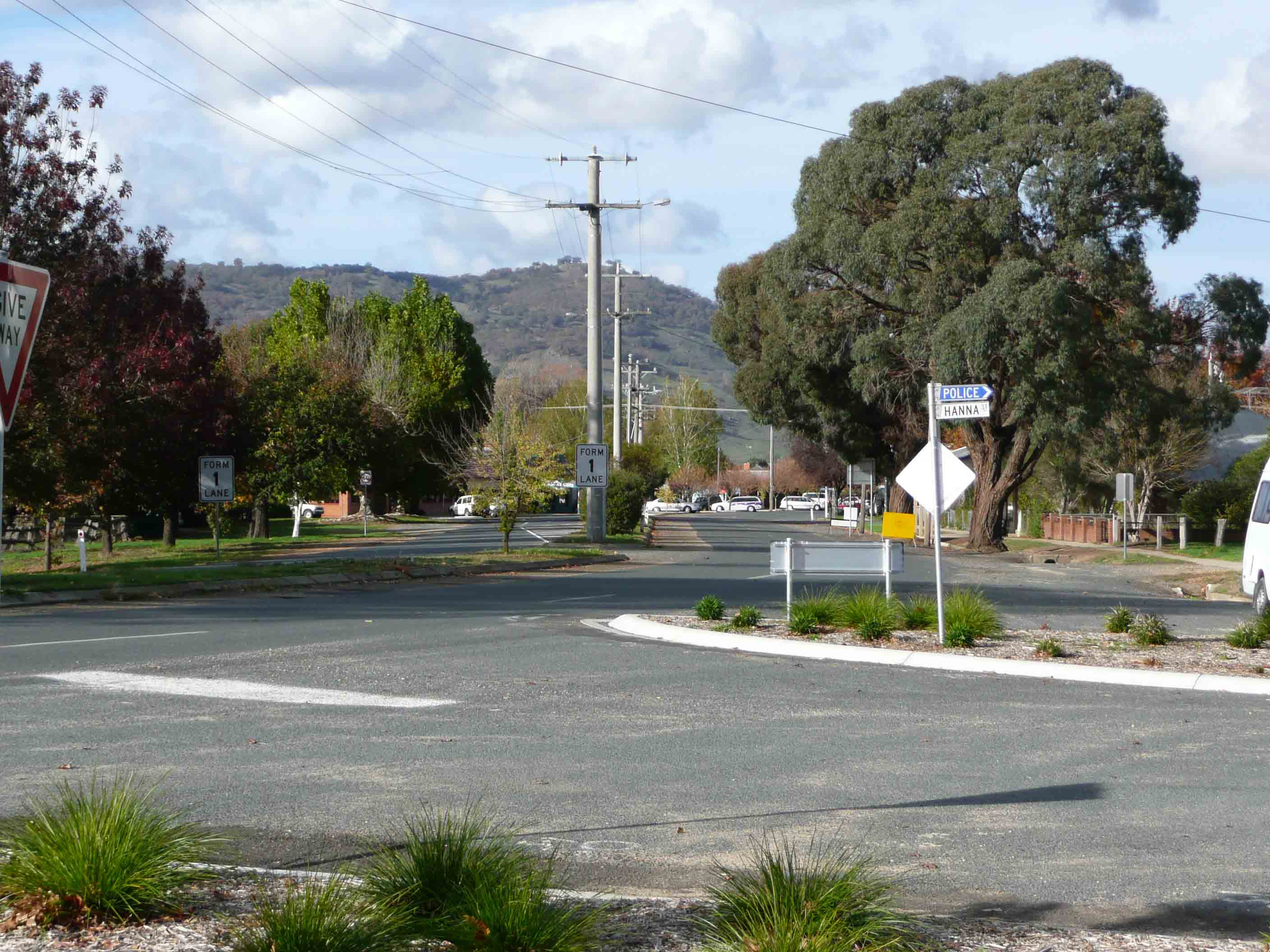
- Main street

- Interactive map of Walwa
- Coordinates: 35°58′S 147°44′E
- Country: Australia
- State: Victoria
- Region: Hume
- LGA: Shire of Towong
- Location: 432 km (268 mi) NE of Melbourne; 112 km (70 mi) E of Wodonga; 48 km (30 mi) NW of Corryong; 52 km (32 mi) SW of Tumbarumba; 8 km (5.0 mi) SE of Jingellic

Government
  - State electorate: Benambra
  - Federal division: Indi
- Elevation: 215 m (705 ft)

Population
  - Total: 191 (2021 census)
- Postcode: 3709
- Annual rainfall: 808.1 mm (31.81 in)

Walwa (/ˈwɒlwə/; Aboriginal for "a place of waters"), is a town in the Shire of Towong in north east Victoria, Australia. The town is located 1 kilometre from the Murray River on the former Murray Valley highway between Wodonga and Corryong. At the 2021 census, the Walwa population was 191.

Across the river on the New South Wales side are the nearby towns of Jingellic and Tumbarumba.

== History ==
A Post Office first opened on 1 March 1861 and closed in 1865. A Post Office again opened on 1 December 1885, although known as Walwa Creek from 1886 until 1905. Currently, the Walwa Post Office is owned and operated by Belinda Mann, and services the areas of Walwa, Burrowye, Guys Forrest and Sandy Creek.

The First Nations owners of this country are the Dhudhuroa people, whose language was spoken in the Murray River Valley from Albury to around Welaregang and Corryong, and inland along the lower Mitta Mitta River, Tallangatta Creek and parts of the Kiewa Valley.

Walwa Hotel was first built in the 1870s. The original timber hotel was burnt down in the 1930s and rebuilt from locally made bricks. The "Old Brick Kiln" remains can still be seen on the Eastern side of the township.

The remnants of the Tin Mines are evident on the Western side of Walwa.

Walwa also had a Butter Factory but closed in the 1970s. There was a large dairy industry in the district.

On the 30th of March 2026, Desmond Christopher Filby, also known as Dezi Bird Freeman, the primary suspect in the August 2025 Porepunkah police shootings, was shot dead by police on a property near Walwa.

== Attractions ==
Pine Mountain a few kilometres out of Walwa, located in the Burrowa-Pine Mountain National Park is the largest monolith in the southern hemisphere at 1.5 times the size of Uluru (Ayers Rock).

Walwa also has a town hall, Walwa Services Memorial Hall. This memorial hall (sometimes named Soldiers' Memorial Hall) commemorates the residents of Walwa who served their country in the First World War and the Second World War.

== Sports and Recreation ==
The town had an Australian rules football team which competed in the Upper Murray Football League from 1898 to 2019 and was known as the Border-Walwa Magpies from 1961 onwards when Walwa merged with Border United FC.

Former players Frank Hanna – Melbourne and Lance Mann – Essendon went on to play VFL senior football. Lance Mann also won the 1952 Stawell Gift.

The football / netball club folded before the 2020 season due to lack of football players.

Golfers play at the course of the Walwa Golf Club on Murray River Road.

== Climate ==
=== Rainfall ===
The Bureau of Meteorology has kept rainfall records at Walwa since 1884, showing a distinct peak in the winter months. The nearest temperature data can be found at Corryong.

Climate data for Walwa (1884–2023); 215 m AMSL; 35.96° S, 147.74° E
Month	Jan	Feb	Mar	Apr	May	Jun	Jul	Aug	Sep	Oct	Nov	Dec	Year
Average rainfall mm (inches)	53.7 (2.11)	46.4 (1.83)	56.9 (2.24)	52.3 (2.06)	67.9 (2.67)	82.6 (3.25)	84.5 (3.33)	86.1 (3.39)	75.4 (2.97)	78.2 (3.08)	63.2 (2.49)	58.9 (2.32)	808.1 (31.81)
Source: Australian Bureau of Meteorology; Walwa

== Gallery ==
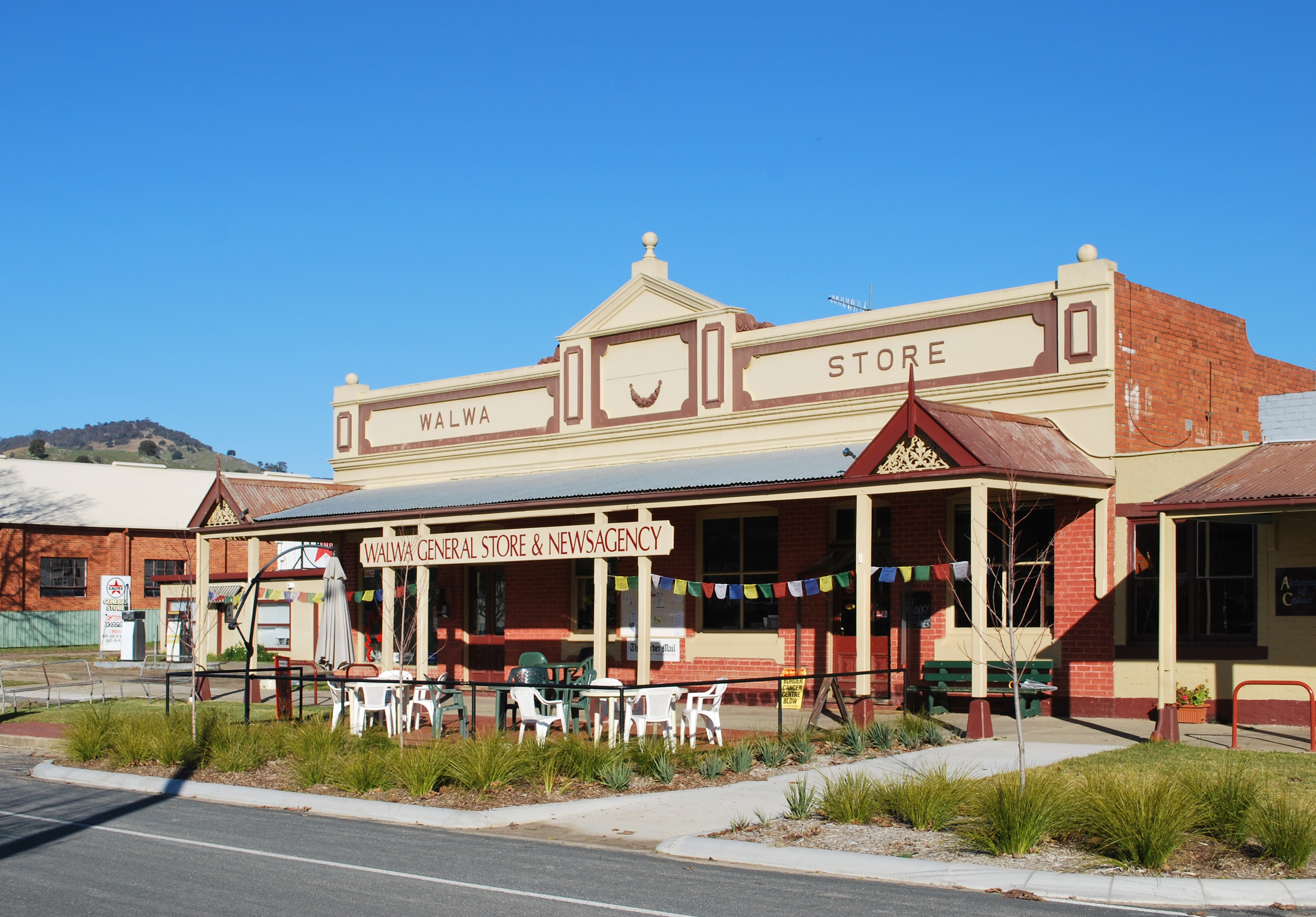
General store and cafe

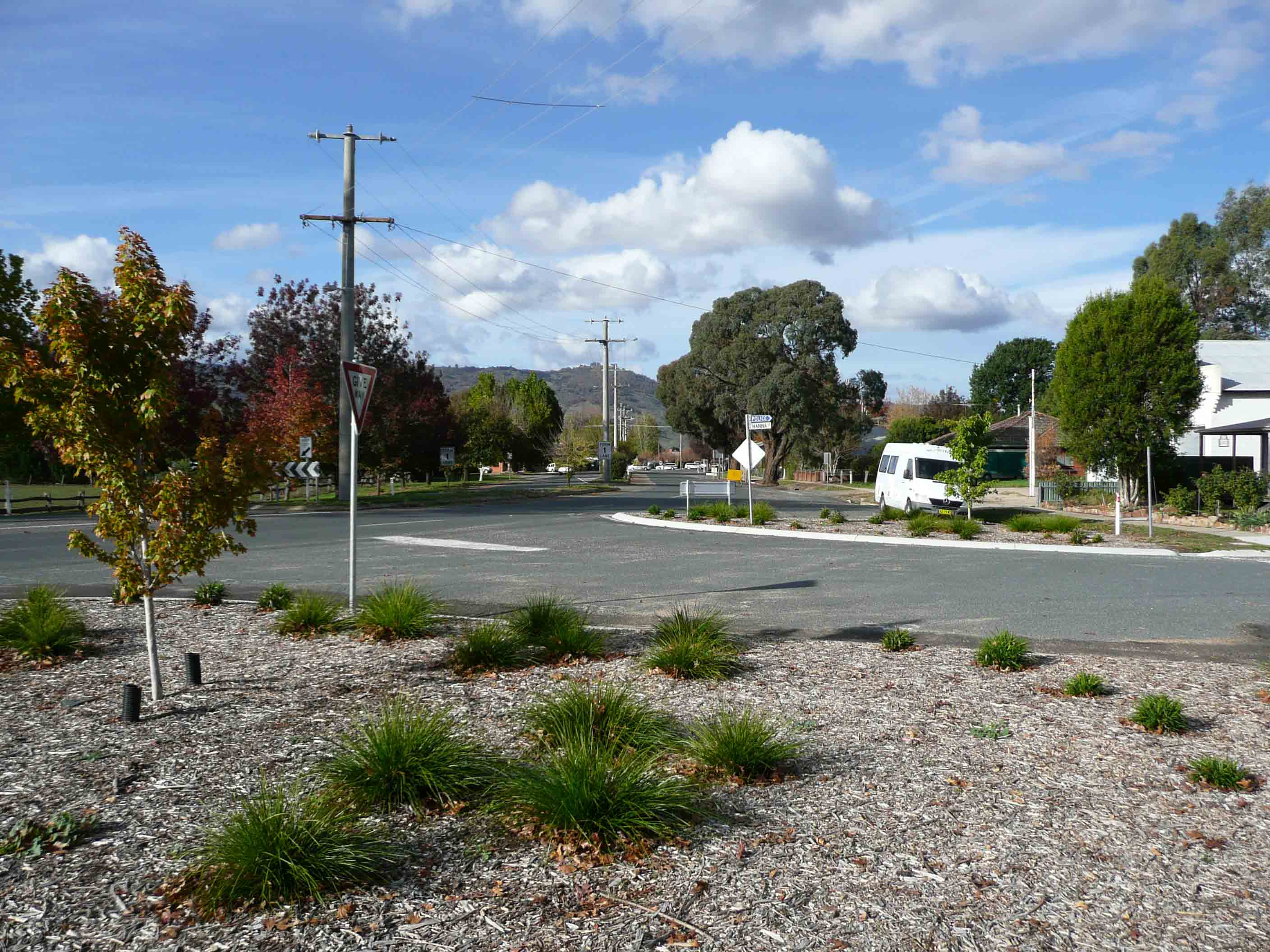
View towards the centre of Walwa

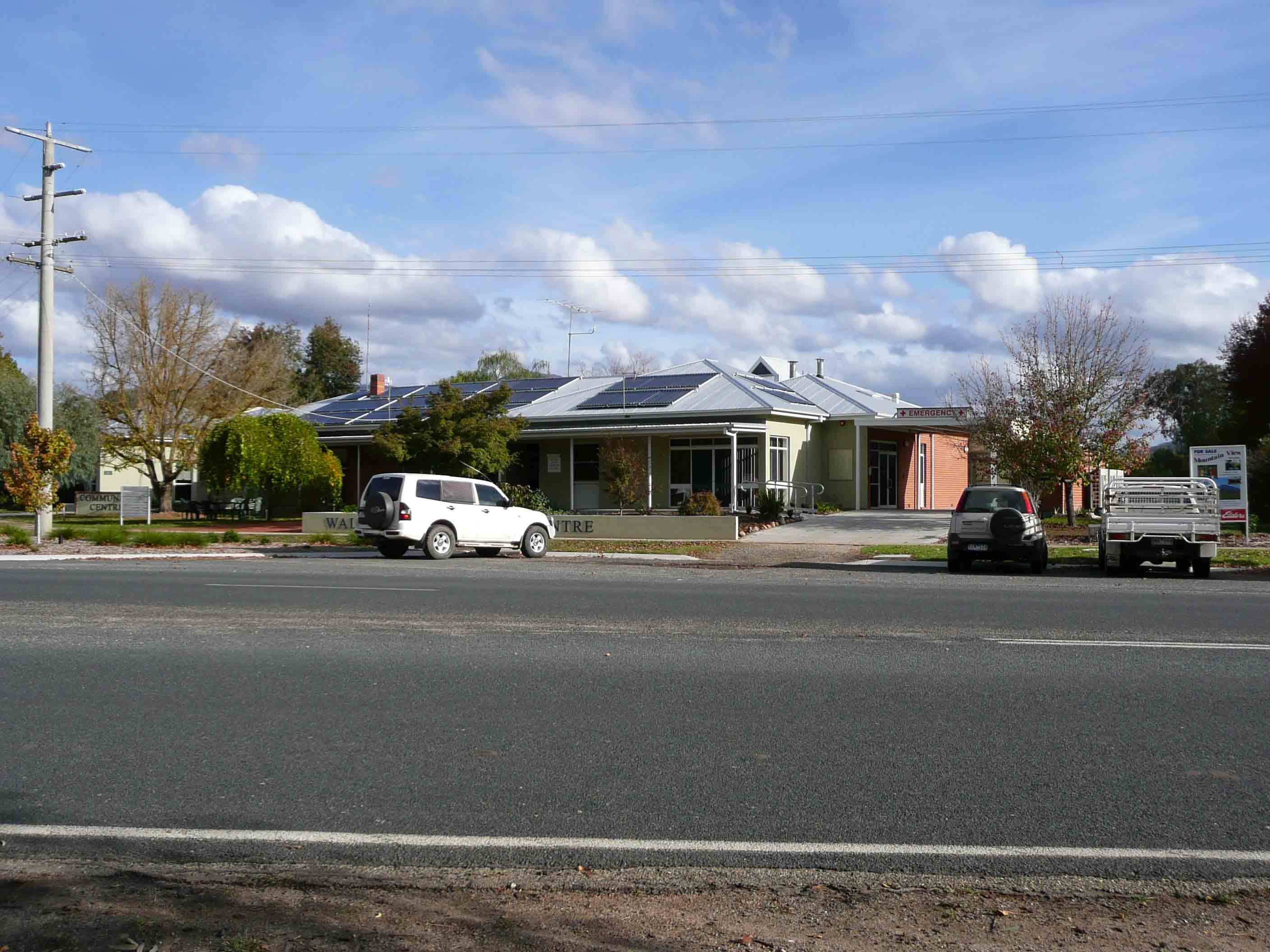
Walwa Medical Centre

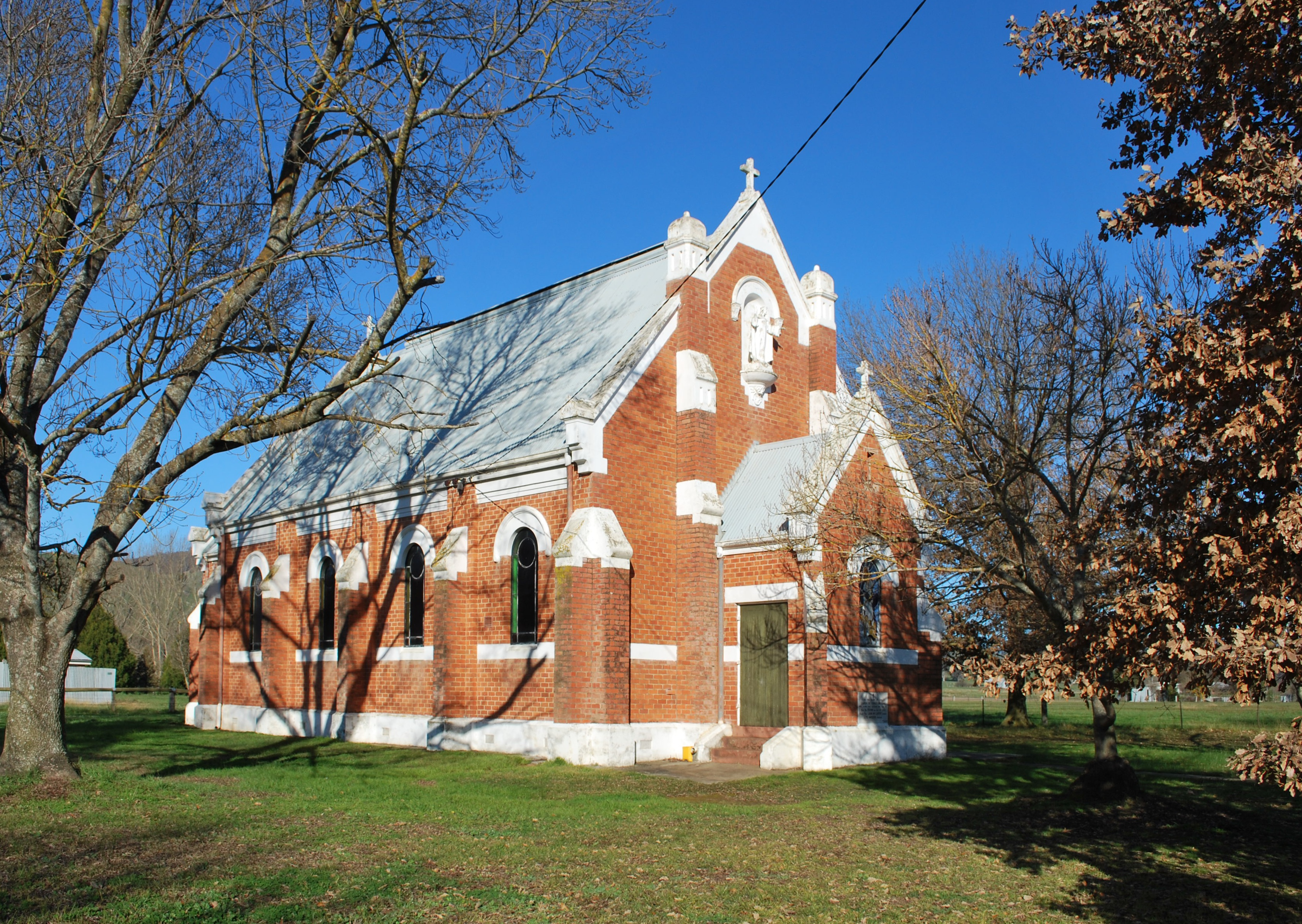
Roman Catholic Church
