= Ebden railway station =

Former railway station in Victoria, Australia

Ebden

General information
- Coordinates: 36°09′00″S 147°01′24″E
- Line: Cudgewa

Other information
- Status: Closed

History
- Opened: 10 September 1889
- Closed: 1 March 1975
- Former names: Bethanga Road; Bethanga

Services
Preceding station	Disused railways	Following station
Bonegilla	Cudgewa line	Huon
	List of closed railway stations in Victoria	
Location

Ebden is a closed railway station, located in the town of Ebden, on the Cudgewa line in Victoria, Australia. All buildings were removed after the closure of the line, leaving only the platform mound remaining.

== History ==
The station opened on 10 September 1889 as Bethanga Road. It was renamed Bethanga on 5 October 1904, and renamed Ebden on 2 May 1910.

Ebden, along with other stations along the line, was erected according to the Act No. 821 of the Victorian Parliament in 1884, authorising the building of a branch line from Wodonga to Talangatta. This operation was reported to have some three hundred men engaged on the work, with the plan to have the section open by 31 March 1888.

The station had featured a passenger platform consisting of three buildings, goods shed and stock yards. This required three tracks, including two sidings. One of which was for the commonly used stock yards, along with a siding to Mitta Junction. Ebden's following station, Huon, was forced to relocate after the introduction of the Hume Wier, although Ebden was recognised to be in a location far enough from the large body of water.

Heavy rail was installed in the Wodonga-Ebden section of the line due to numerous migrant special trains throughout the 1950s and 1960s, consisting usually of locomotives such as A2s, Rs and, later, B class diesels. Bonegilla was the planned terminus for these special trains, although a run-around loop was non existent. So the stopping place was pushed forward to the next station on the line, being Ebden.

Ebden, along with other railway stations on the Cudgewa line, had seen a dramatic decline in services after the Snowy Hydro Electric Scheme (rail transport of goods for the creating of the Snowy Hydro Electricity Plant) by the early 1970s. By August 1975, the siding at the station was abolished.

Services kept declining until there was only one goods train per week, commonly known to be hauled by dynamic brake locomotive T413. Stock trains on the line had also depleted, due to the rapid upgrading of road transport.

On 1 March 1975, the station was closed to all traffic. The line itself officially closed on 1 March 1981, despite the last regular goods service ran on the 21 April 1978.

== Today ==
In 2006, the Apex Club of Wodonga began rebuilding the passenger platform, as part of a project to restore the station area as an asset of the High Country Rail Trail. The platform itself was complete at the end of 2008. It was further upgraded during 2010-2012, which included a picnic shelter and table, station name board and a historic information signboard.
