= Bonegilla =

- Town
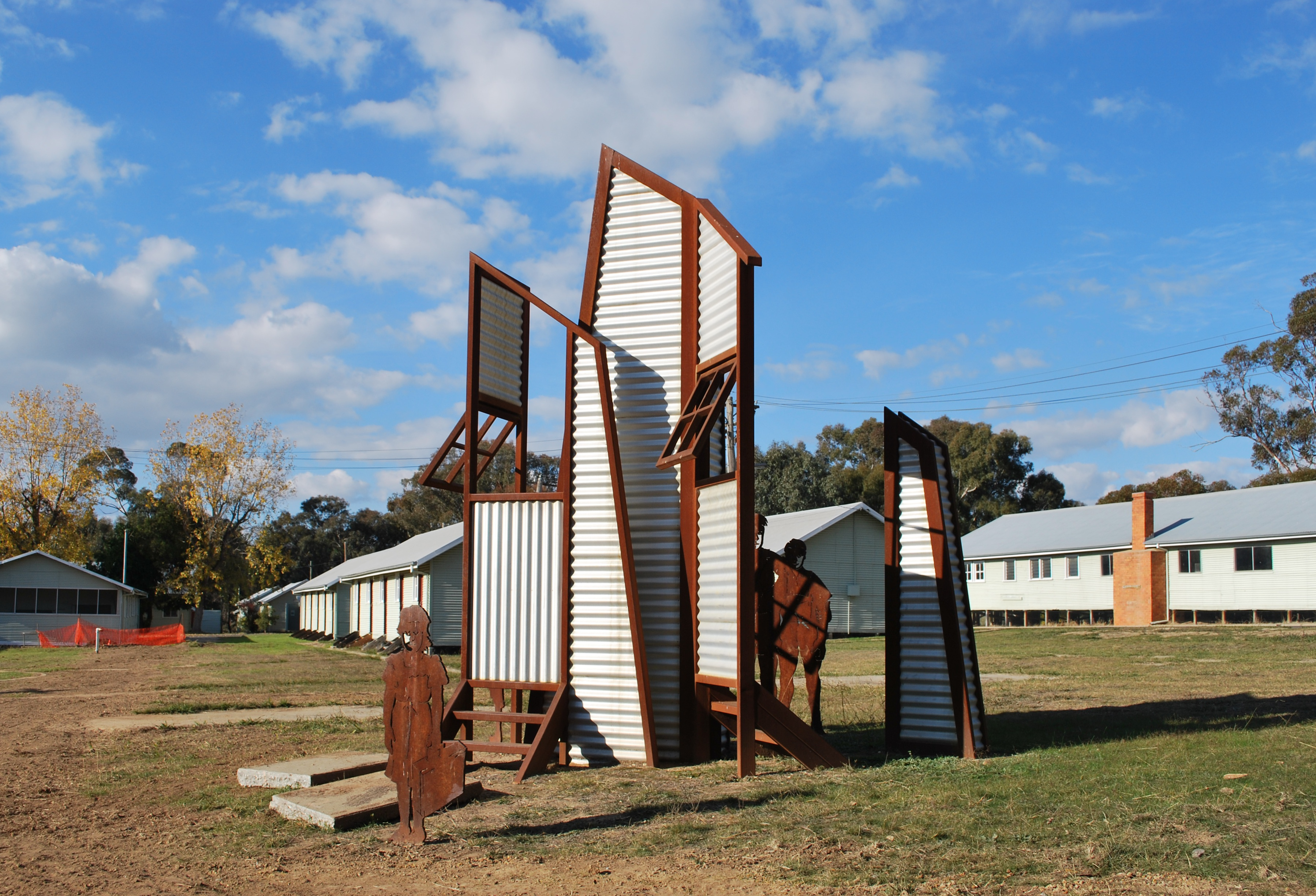
- Sculpture at the migrant camp. Some of the buildings that once housed migrants can be seen in the background.

- Coordinates: 36°08′S 147°00′E
- Country: Australia
- State: Victoria
- Region: Hume
- LGA: City of Wodonga

Government
  - State electorate: Benambra
  - Federal division: Indi

Population
  - Total: 610 (2021 census)
- Postcode: 3691

Bonegilla is a town of the City of Wodonga local government area in north-east Victoria, Australia, ten km (6 mi) east of Wodonga, and around 300 km (190 mi) north-east of Melbourne. At the 2021 census, Bonegilla and the surrounding area had a population of 610.

== History ==
Bonegilla Post Office opened on 20 August 1878 and closed in 1951. Bonegilla Military Post Office was open from 1940 to 1947 and from 1983 to 1998, after which it relocated to nearby Bandiana.

Much of the development of the town was due to the Cudgewa railway line which opened in 1889 and closed in 1981. The line was used both in the development of, and transporting materials for, the Snowy Mountains Scheme and the main method of transporting thousands of migrants to the Bonegilla Migrant Reception Centre from Station Pier in Port Melbourne. The rail line has since been removed, and is now the High Country Rail Trail, a bike path linking Wodonga to Lake Hume.

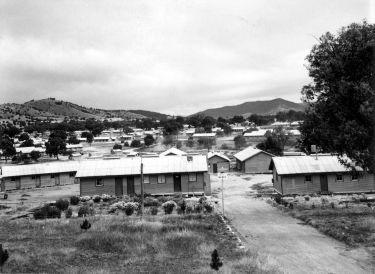
Bonegilla migrant camp, 1954

=== Bonegilla migrant camp ===
As part of the Post war immigration to Australia, Australia's first migrant reception centre opened at Bonegilla in December 1947 with an intake of the first assisted migrants from Europe, Baltic refugees from Germany. Assisted migrants who had not been refugees began arriving in 1951. The Australian Army had established a camp and military hospital on the site in 1940 as Albury-Wodonga was considered strategically important during the Second World War. Initially the army provided transport and security services to the migrant centre. The camp at Bonegilla closed in 1971 by which time some 320,000 migrants from over 30 countries had spent time there. It is estimated that over 1.5 million Australians are descended from migrants who spent time at Bonegilla.

== See also ==
- Bonegilla railway station
- Post war immigration to Australia
- Bonegilla Migrant Reception and Training Centre
