= Bonegilla railway station =

Former railway station in Victoria, Australia

Coordinates: 36°08′29″S 146°59′29″E

Bonegilla Station

General information
- Location: Bonegilla, Victoria; Australia
- Owner: VicRail
- Operator: VicRail
- Line: Cudgewa,

Construction
- Structure type: Train Station

Other information
- Status: Closed
- Station code: 3691

History
- Opened: 1920
- Closed: 1981

Services
Preceding station	Disused railways	Following station
Bandiana	Cudgewa line	Ebden
	List of closed railway stations in Victoria	
Location

Bonegilla was a railway station located in the town of Bonegilla, on the Cudgewa railway line in Victoria, Australia.

From 1947 to 1971, Bonegilla Army Camp operated as the Bonegilla Migrant Reception and Training Centre. During this time, nearly all of the 320,000 displaced refugees bound for the site would arrive at Bonegilla by train with most of them coming via Station Pier, Melbourne.

Much of the development of the town of Bonegilla was due to the Cudgewa railway line which opened in 1889 and closed in 1981. The platform has been restored as part of the High Country Rail Trail.
