= Bandiana railway station =

Former railway station in Victoria, Australia

Bandiana

General information
- Location: Australia
- Coordinates: 36.1490°S 146.9356°E
- System: regional rail
- Owner: Australian Rail Track Corporation (1997-2009)
- Operator: Victorian Railways
- Line: Cudgewa
- Platforms: 1
- Tracks: 2

Construction
- Structure type: At-grade

Other information
- Status: Closed
- Station code: BND

History
- Opened: 10 September 1889
- Closed: September 1961 (Passenger); 27 August 2009 (Freight)

Services
Preceding station	VicRail	Following station
Wodonga Terminus	Cudgewa line	Bonegilla towards Cudgewa
Location

Bandiana is a closed station located in the town of Bandiana, on the Cudgewa railway line in Victoria, Australia. Originally opening on the 10 September 1889 the station saw passenger service until September 1961. Part of the Cudgewa railway line was converted to dual gauge in 1944 to serve freight depots around Bandiana.

In 1941, a signal box 'Box C' was built, completed on 21 September 1941 however did not come into use until 22 March 1942. This signal box was built and used to control rail movements into and out of the Cudgewa line and later the Bandiana siding. C box was abolished as part of the line closure on 1 September 2009.

The Cudgewa line was converted from broad to dual gauge between Wodonga, connecting to the North East railway line towards Melbourne, this was opened on 17 October 1983.

In January 1995, the broad gauge track was removed making Bandiana yard standard gauge track only. As part of standardisation works, the direct link from Bandiana to Albury was removed leaving only the link to Wodonga and towards Melbourne. The Wodonga-Bandiana section closed on 1 September 2009 as part of the Wodonga Rail Bypass project. After the last train had ran on 27 August 2009

Bandiana railway station was previously used to bogie exchange railway equipment from standard gauge to broad gauge or vice versa. Victoria's first Mainline diesel, B class No.60, was gauge converted at Bandiana during its delivery from Clyde Engineering to the Victorian Railways in 1952. When through running between Victoria and New South Wales commenced, the need for bogie exchange Facilities at Bandiana ceased.

Today a portion of Bandiana railway yard is still intact with signalling infrastructure and railway track. There is nothing left of the station building or platform.
