= Huon railway station =

Former railway station in Victoria, Australia

Huon

General information
- Location: Australia
- Coordinates: 36°13′11″S 147°03′56″E
- System: Former Cudgewa line passenger and goods services
- Line: Cudgewa
- Platforms: Restored

Other information
- Status: Closed

History
- Opened: 10 September 1889
- Closed: 1 March 1981

Services
Preceding station	Disused railways	Following station
Ebden	Cudgewa line	Bolga
	List of closed railway stations in Victoria	
Location

Huon is a closed station located in the town of Huon, on the Cudgewa railway line in Victoria, Australia. Huon Railway Station, had officially opened in 1889 being known as "Huon Lane" until 1904. Huon was erected as part of the "octopus act", an infamous railway building act consisting of 65 proposed railway projects in Victoria. The Cudgewa Line (consisting of Houn station) branched off at the former Wodonga Station, creating a junction station for passengers wishing to travel on the Cudgewa line.

== Relocation ==
Originally, the Huon railway station was located approximately one kilometre north of its current location and was forced to relocate in 1932 after the introduction of the Hume Wier. This large body of water had also forced the entire township of Tallangatta to relocate including the railway station servicing the town when gates were installed on the Hume spillway to increase the weirs capacity

The "new" railway station of Huon, was very similar to that of the "old" Huon railway station, consisting of 4 roads, a platform and goods shed for local goods trains. The major difference separating the two railway stations is the location of the goods shed, with the "new" Huon goods shed being in the centre of 4 road, instead of at the east of 4 road.

== Demise of the Cudgewa Line ==
Huon Railway Station along with other railway stations on the Cudgewa Line had seen a dramatic decline in services after the Snowy Hydro Electric Scheme (rail transport of goods for the creating of the Snowy Hydro Electricity Plant) by the early 1970s.

As services kept declining until there was only one goods train per week, commonly known to be hauled by dynamic brake fitted locomotive T413. Stock trains on the Cudgewa Line had also depleted due to the rapid upgrading of road transport.

Huon station along with the whole of the Cudgewa line officially closed on 1 March 1981, despite the last regular goods service running on 21 April 1978.

== Huon Railway Station today ==
After a closure from 36 years ago, much of the Huon station has been depleted, although is known as being the most intact station on the Cudgewa Line. Today, the platform remains, opposite the remnant goods shed.
