= Shelley, Victoria =

Shelley
- Town
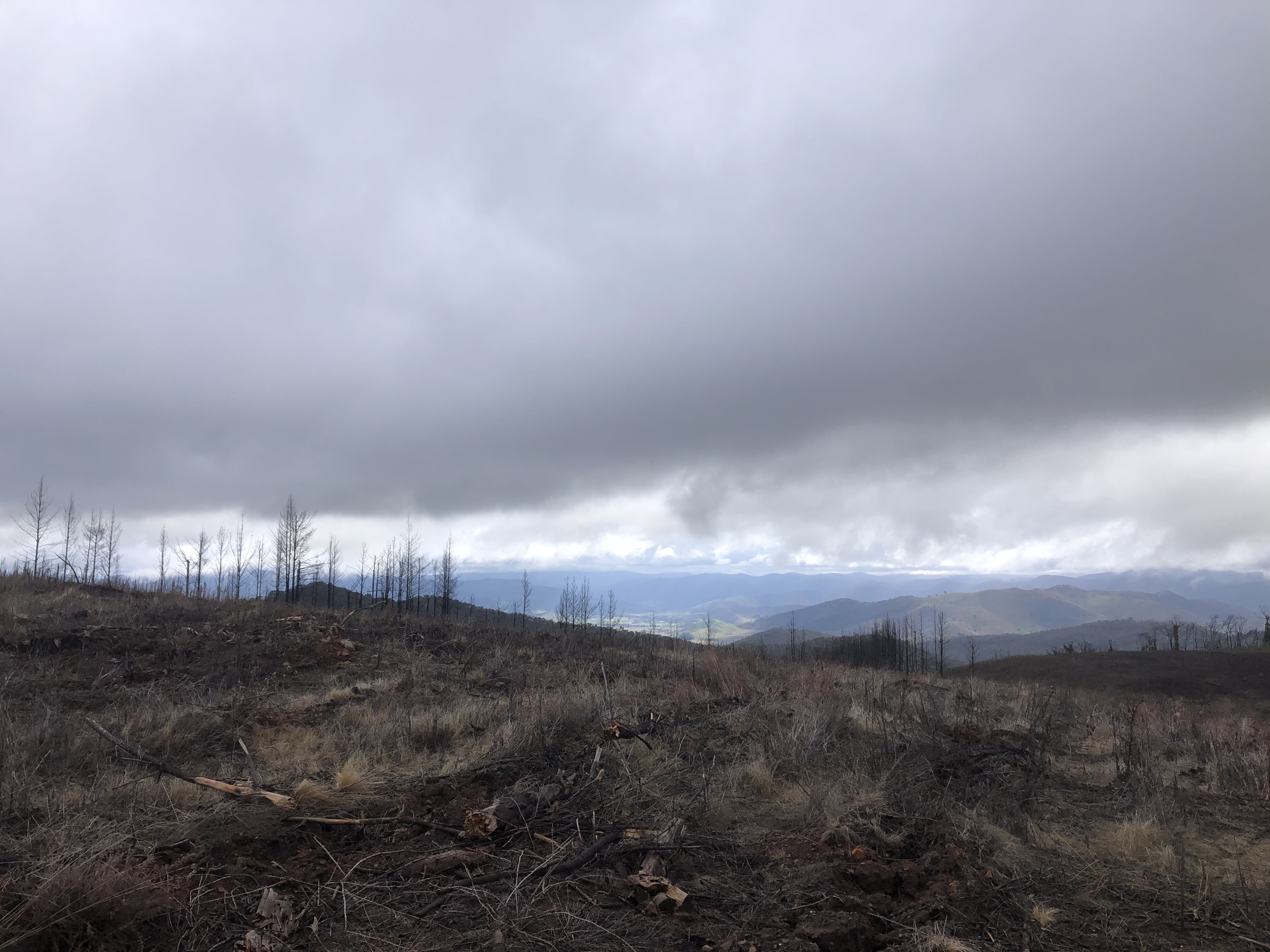
- Cleared pine plantation area at Shelley, looking down towards Walwa

- Coordinates: 36°11′S 147°32′E
- Country: Australia
- State: Victoria
- Region: Hume
- LGA: Shire of Towong
- Location: 405 km (252 mi) NE of Melbourne; 89 km (55 mi) ESE of Albury; 43 km (27 mi) E of Tallangatta; 39 km (24 mi) W of Corryong; 30 km (19 mi) SW of Walwa

Government
  - State electorate: Benambra
  - Federal division: Indi
- Elevation: 798 m (2,618 ft)

Population
  - Total: 5 (SAL 2021)
- Postcode: 3701
- Mean max temp: 16.4 °C (61.5 °F)
- Mean min temp: 7.9 °C (46.2 °F)
- Annual rainfall: 1,219.1 mm (48.00 in)

Shelley is a former town on the Cudgewa railway line in Northeast Victoria. It was home to the highest railway station in Victoria, at 781 metres (2,562 ft) above sea level.

The Shelley Railway Station was opened in 1916 and closed in 1979. The railway was used early in its life to transport farmer's livestock from the Upper Murray to Wodonga. From the 1950s the railway was used heavily to transport equipment and machinery from Wodonga to the Upper Murray to help build the Snowy Mountains Hydro Electric Scheme.

The Snowy Hydro Scheme was completed in 1974 and after several years of low level use, the railway was closed. Some remnants of the Shelley Station passenger platform can still be seen here today, along with some information boards. The Shelley Railway Station forms part of the High Country Rail Trail.

The area is now chiefly characterised by extensive pine plantations; HVP purchased the Koetong and Shelley Pine Plantations from State Government in 1998 and it has been owned and run by HVP ever since. HVP manage approximately 43,244 acres (17,500 ha) of continuous plantations which include approximately 12,355 acres (5,000 ha) of native bush, reserved for conservation. The HVP Plantations contribute to local employment in the area.

== Climate ==
Being one of the highest localities in Victoria and located near the southern boundary of the South West Slopes, winters are particularly cold by maximum temperatures, with frequent and oftentimes heavy snowfalls. Cloudy skies dominate from May through to September. Climate data are sourced at Hunters Hill, in the pine plantations to the south of Shelley at an altitude of 981 metres (3,219 ft), operating since 1993.

It features a particularly wide seasonal range in maximum temperatures, almost a range of 20 °C: from 26 °C (79 °F) in January to just 7 °C (45 °F) in July. Rainfall peaks distinctly in winter.

Climate data for Hunters Hill (1993–2023); 981 m AMSL; 36.21° S, 147.54° E
Month	Jan	Feb	Mar	Apr	May	Jun	Jul	Aug	Sep	Oct	Nov	Dec	Year
Record high °C (°F)	38.8 (101.8)	36.9 (98.4)	32.8 (91.0)	26.2 (79.2)	21.3 (70.3)	16.2 (61.2)	13.8 (56.8)	18.4 (65.1)	24.5 (76.1)	28.6 (83.5)	33.3 (91.9)	36.0 (96.8)	38.8 (101.8)
Mean daily maximum °C (°F)	26.1 (79.0)	25.1 (77.2)	21.7 (71.1)	16.5 (61.7)	11.7 (53.1)	8.4 (47.1)	7.4 (45.3)	9.0 (48.2)	12.3 (54.1)	16.2 (61.2)	19.9 (67.8)	22.8 (73.0)	16.4 (61.6)
Mean daily minimum °C (°F)	14.6 (58.3)	13.9 (57.0)	11.6 (52.9)	8.5 (47.3)	5.4 (41.7)	3.0 (37.4)	2.0 (35.6)	2.6 (36.7)	4.6 (40.3)	7.2 (45.0)	10.0 (50.0)	11.9 (53.4)	7.9 (46.3)
Record low °C (°F)	3.0 (37.4)	2.3 (36.1)	1.6 (34.9)	−0.3 (31.5)	−2.1 (28.2)	−2.2 (28.0)	−2.6 (27.3)	−3.1 (26.4)	−4.1 (24.6)	−1.4 (29.5)	−1.0 (30.2)	0.8 (33.4)	−4.1 (24.6)
Average precipitation mm (inches)	78.8 (3.10)	69.6 (2.74)	72.8 (2.87)	73.4 (2.89)	100.7 (3.96)	140.0 (5.51)	150.6 (5.93)	138.9 (5.47)	117.0 (4.61)	95.3 (3.75)	100.2 (3.94)	78.1 (3.07)	1,219.1 (48.00)
Average precipitation days (≥ 0.2 mm)	8.3	7.4	8.0	8.4	12.0	15.3	18.5	16.4	13.6	11.3	10.8	8.8	138.8
Average afternoon relative humidity (%)	43	47	48	58	73	82	80	74	68	58	52	46	61
Source: Australian Bureau of Meteorology; Hunters Hill
