= List of places on the Victorian Heritage Register in the City of Wodonga =

This is a list of places on the Victorian Heritage Register in the City of Wodonga in Victoria, Australia. The Victorian Heritage Register is maintained by the Heritage Council of Victoria.

The Victorian Heritage Register, as of 2026, lists the following four state-registered places within the City of Wodonga:

Place name	Place #	Location	Suburb or Town	Co-ordinates	Built	State registered	Photo
Block 19	VHR H1835	82 Bonegilla Road	Bonegilla	36.131000°S 147.013389°E	1940	10 May 2002	
Cambourne	VHR H0233	2 High Street	Wodonga	36.110994°S 146.894751°E	1900	9 October 1974	
De Kerilleau Homestead	VHR H0381	200 Bandiana Link Road	Wodonga	36.117139°S 146.918472°E	1870	12 May 1976	
Former Clyde Cameron College	VHR H2192	41-69 Nordsvan Drive	Wodonga	36.139472°S 146.877000°E	1976	12 February 2009	
