= Tatonga railway station =

Former railway station in Victoria, Australia

Tatonga

General information
- Line: Cudgewa

Other information
- Status: Closed

History
- Opened: 24 July 1891
- Closed: 1 March 1981

Services
Preceding station	Disused railways	Following station
Bolga	Cudgewa line	Tallangatta
	List of closed railway stations in Victoria	

Tatonga is a closed station located in the town of Tatonga, on the Cudgewa railway line in Victoria, Australia. Today, there is nothing left of the station.
