= Wodonga railway station =

Railway station in Victoria, Australia

Wodonga
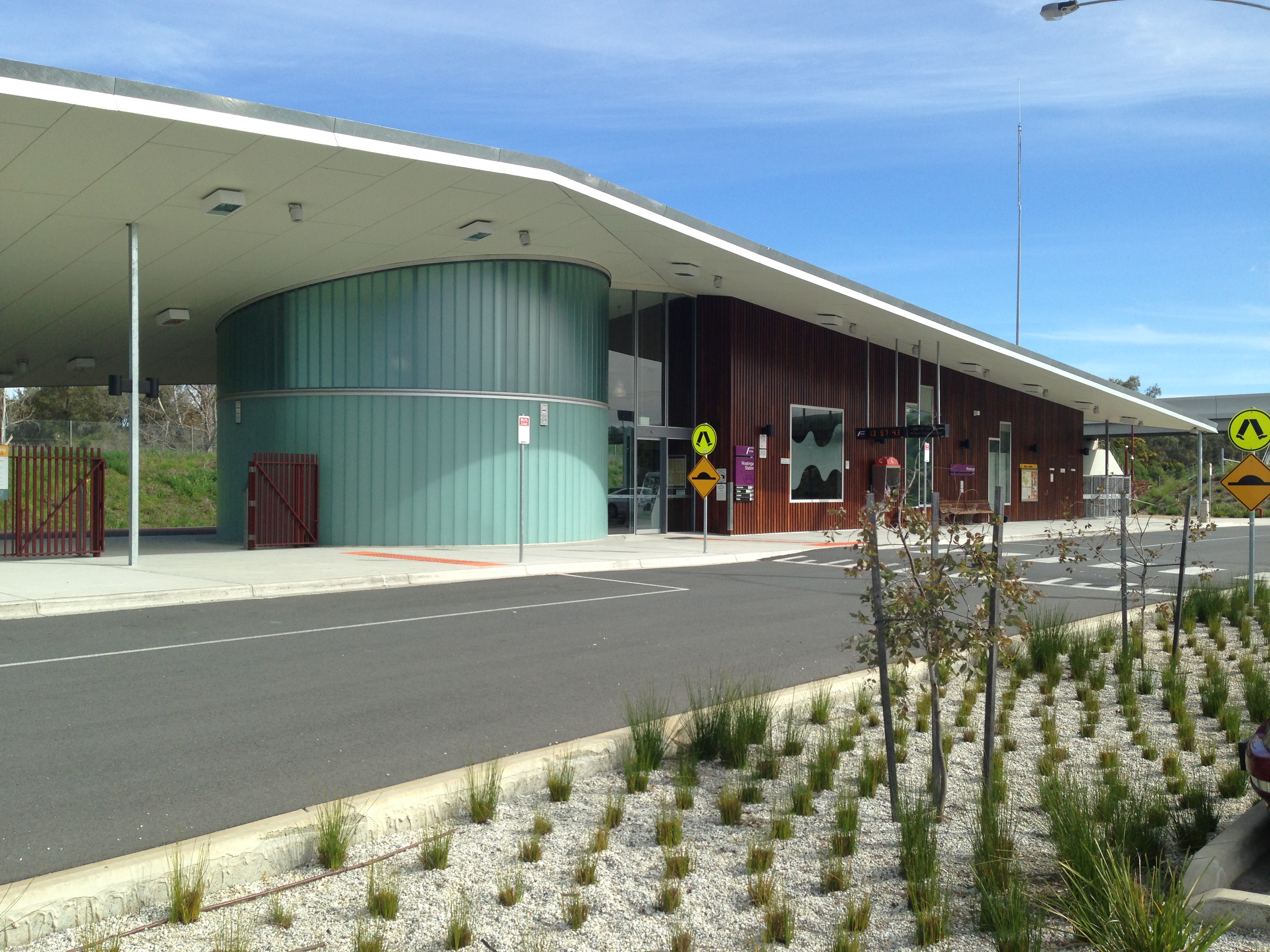
- Station building and entrance, September 2013

General information
- Location: Moloney Drive, Wodonga, Victoria 3690; City of Wodonga; Australia
- Coordinates: 36.105743°S 146.87162°E
- System: PTV regional rail station
- Owner: VicTrack
- Operator: V/Line
- Line: Albury (North East)
- Distance: 299.20 kilometres from Southern Cross
- Platforms: 1
- Tracks: 2
- Connections: Coach

Construction
- Structure type: Ground
- Parking: Yes
- Cycle facilities: Yes
- Accessible: Yes

Other information
- Status: Operational, staffed
- Station code: WOD
- Fare zone: Myki zone 26/27
- Website: Public Transport Victoria

History
- Opened: 21 November 1873; 152 years ago
- Closed: 8 November 2008; 17 years ago
- Rebuilt: 25 June 2011; 15 years ago

Services
Preceding station	V/Line	Following station
Chiltern towards Southern Cross	Albury line	Albury Terminus
Former services
Preceding station	VicRail	Following station
Barnawartha towards Spencer Street	Albury line	Albury Terminus
Terminus	Cudgewa line	Bandiana towards Cudgewa
Location
- Location within Victoria

Wodonga railway station is located on the North East line in Victoria, Australia. It serves the city of Wodonga, and it opened on 25 June 2011.

Opening as part of the Wodonga Rail Bypass project, it replaced the original station that opened on 21 November 1873 and closed on 9 November 2008.

Disused station Barnawartha is located between Wodonga and Chiltern.

== History ==
=== As a terminus ===
Wodonga station was the original terminus of the Victorian Railways' North East line, which was built during the 1870s, with Wodonga opening on 21 November 1873. The connection through to the standard gauge system across the Murray River to Albury was not completed until 14 June 1883, partly because the New South Wales Government Railways standard gauge system had not yet extended as far south as Albury.

Intercolonial rivalries were settled by the building of lines and bridges of both gauges across the border river flats, with both Albury and Wodonga being transfer stations. Albury later became the passenger interchange station and the major freight transshipment point.

=== Standard gauge ===
In April 1962, the standard gauge line was extended south from Wodonga to Melbourne, and from that time onwards, most interstate haulage was on the standard gauge. Some broad gauge passenger trains still continued to operate to Albury, to provide a local service to north-eastern Victorian towns, but the long distance interstate freight and passenger trains operated via this new continuous standard gauge link between Melbourne and Sydney.

Livestock, mostly beef cattle, formed a large part of the freight carried to Melbourne from Wodonga, where large saleyards were established near the station. Meatworks were also one of Wodonga's main industries. After 1980, the saleyard was moved to Bandiana, east of Wodonga. Dual gauge rail access was constructed at this selling centre, which was adjacent to the Victorian Cudgewa branch line. Services on this branch were discontinued beyond Bandiana, and the Victorian rail system soon ceased livestock traffic. Cattle continued to be occasionally railed from northern NSW to Bandiana Saleyards until 1987, when this rail traffic also ceased. In later years, the sidings at Bandiana were used as a rail container terminal by standard gauge trains only, until closure of the line on 1 September 2009.

Until November 2008, Pacific National operated broad gauge freight services from the Wodonga Coal Sidings to Geelong, carrying logs for woodchipping.

=== Wodonga Rail Bypass ===
The Wodonga Rail Bypass project moved Wodonga station from the original central location to a position on a new line on the northern edge of the town, along with five kilometres of new track. The release of railway land allowed the redevelopment of Wodonga's commercial area, and eliminated ten level crossings. First conceived in 2000, design work commenced in 2006.

In May 2008, it was announced that the project would commence, as part of an upgrade of the North-East line. The last passenger train passed through Wodonga on 8 November 2008, with road coaches operating between Seymour and Albury. The first train passed through the new station site on 15 March 2010: a freight service delivering concrete sleepers.

On 23 July 2010, the new rail bypass was opened, and the original line through Wodonga closed. On 25 June 2011, the new station opened. The original station was later redeveloped as a restaurant.

== Platforms and services ==
Wodonga has one platform. It is serviced by V/Line Albury line services.

Wodonga platform arrangement
Platform	Line	Destination
1	Albury line	Southern Cross, Albury

== Transport links ==
V/Line operates road coaches from Wodonga station to Canberra, Albury, Seymour, Kerang, Wangaratta and Adelaide.
