= Bolga railway station =

Former railway station in Victoria, Australia

Bolga

General information
- Coordinates: 36°13′06.3″S 147°10′43.4″E
- Line: Cudgewa

Other information
- Status: Closed

History
- Opened: 18 July 1890
- Closed: 1 March 1981

Services
| Preceding station | Disused railways | Following station |
|---|---|---|
| Huon | Cudgewa line | Tatonga |
| | List of closed railway stations in Victoria | |
Location

Bolga is a closed station located in the town of Bolga, on the Cudgewa railway line in Victoria, Australia. Since 1 March 1981, there is nothing left of the station.
