= Tallangatta and District Ski Club =

Tallangatta & District Ski Club
- Formation: December 1947
- Headquarters: Tallangatta, Victoria, Australia
- Region served: Mount Wills, Victorian Alps
- Affiliations: Federation of Victorian Ski Clubs

The Tallangatta & District Ski Club (TSC) is a ski club based in North East Victoria, Australia. Founded in 1947, the club was pioneer of alpine infrastructure on Mount Wills. While the club's mechanical tow lifts are no longer in operation, the organization remains active with a consistent membership base.

== History ==
The club was established in December 1947 following a public meeting of 117 local residents. Founding members included Tom Dunlop, Alex Turnbull, and Ian Paton, who identified Mount Wills (1,755m) as a viable local skiing destination due to its proximity to Tallangatta via the Omeo Highway.

In its early decades, the club operated as a self-sufficient community entity. Members frequently hand-crafted their own skis from local timber, and the club's facilities were built entirely through volunteer labor. The TSC has never operated as a commercial resort, maintaining its status as a private club for its members.

== Infrastructure ==
The club developed two primary structures on the Razorback Spur of Mount Wills:

- Woolybutt Lodge: Constructed in 1948 at an altitude of 1,500m. The lodge was built from locally sourced timber and features a split-slab frame. It remains the club's primary base on the mountain.
- Snowgum Hut (Summit Hut): Built in 1952 near the summit of Mount Wills to provide a high-altitude refuge. In the early 1960s, as the club's focus shifted away from the summit plateau, this site was transitioned to the Forests Commission of Victoria. It subsequently served as the base for the Mount Wills fire observation operations.

A mechanised rope tow was installed and operated by the club during the 1954 season. While the lift infrastructure is no longer active, the site is preserved as part of the club's history.

== Current Status ==
The Tallangatta & District Ski Club continues to operate as an active membership-based organization. Woolybutt Lodge is maintained by the club and serves as a landmark for hikers on the Australian Alps Walking Track. The summit area, formerly occupied by the club's Snowgum Hut, remains a key site for regional fire management and currently hosts the Mount Wills Fire Lookout.
