= Tallangatta railway station =

Former railway station in Victoria, Australia

Tallangatta

General information
- Location: Womaatong St, Tallangatta; Australia
- Coordinates: 36°13′08″S 147°10′46″E
- Owner: Victorian Railways
- Line: Cudgewa
- Distance: 341km from Spencer Street
- Platforms: 1
- Tracks: 2 (At closure)

Construction
- Structure type: At-grade

Other information
- Status: Closed
- Website: highcountryrailtrail.org.au

History
- Opened: 24 July 1891
- Closed: 1 March 1981
- Rebuilt: 13 October 1957

Services
Preceding station	Disused railways	Following station
Tatonga	Cudgewa line	Bullioh
	List of closed railway stations in Victoria	
Location

Tallangatta is a closed station located in the town of Tallangatta, on the Cudgewa railway line in Victoria, Australia. Today the station is privately owned.

In the late 50s and early 60s, traffic at the station included collecting loaded iced wagons from the Tallangatta butter factory. Steam trains in both directions would stop at Tallangatta for the engines to top up water and crews to have a meal break, before reattaching and continuing.

A railmotor ran from Tallangatta to Wodonga, leaving about 7am, to connect with the 8.10am Passenger train to Melbourne; this service ceased in September 1961.

The turntable at Tallangatta was abolished in 1976.
