= Tallangatta Primary School =

Location
- 1 Wonga Grove; Tallangatta, Victoria 3700; Australia
- Coordinates: 36.2163°S 147.1784°E

Information
- Type: Government primary school
- Established: January 1, 1874
- School number: 1365
- Enrollment: ~91 (as of 2026)
- Language: English
- Colors: Navy Blue and Gold
- Website: www.tallangattaps.vic.edu.au

== History ==
=== Founding and Early Years (1874–1954) ===
Tallangatta Primary School (School No. 1365) was officially established on January 1, 1874. The school originally served the township of "Old Tallangatta," located at the confluence of the Mitta Mitta River and Tallangatta Creek. For eighty years, it operated as a central educational hub for the region's agricultural and mining communities.

=== The "Town That Moved" ===
The school is historically notable for its relocation during the 1950s. Due to the expansion of the Hume Dam (Lake Hume), the original townsite was designated for flooding. Between 1952 and 1958, the State Rivers and Water Supply Commission oversaw the relocation of the entire township 8 kilometers west to the current site at Bolga. The school was re-established on its current elevated site on Wonga Grove, and the new town was officially reopened on June 29, 1956.

=== Mergers ===
On January 1, 1989, Bullioh Primary School (No. 2495) was closed and formally merged with Tallangatta Primary School. Enrolment records and historical artifacts from Bullioh were transferred to the Tallangatta campus as part of the consolidation.

== Campus and Facilities ==
The school is situated on an elevated site overlooking the township and Lake Hume. Between 2023 and 2026, the school underwent a significant "Upgrade and Modernisation" project funded by the Victorian School Building Authority (VSBA).

Key facility improvements included:

- Modernization of the main administrative building and learning spaces.
- Structural upgrades to "Block B."
- Extensive drainage works and resurfacing of hard-court areas and basketball courts.

== Curriculum ==
The school delivers the Victorian Curriculum F-10 with a focus on literacy and numeracy. Specialist subjects provided to all levels include:

- Auslan: The primary Language Other Than English (LOTE).
- STEM: Focus on digital technology, including robotics and coding.
- Visual Arts: Dedicated weekly sessions in Art Studies.
- Physical Education and Health: Integrated with regional sporting activities.

== See also ==
- Education in Victoria
- Hume Dam
- Shire of Towong
