= Dual gauge =

Railway track with more than two rails

A dual gauge railroad track has three or four rails, allowing vehicles of two track gauges to run on it.

Signalling and sidings are more expensive to install on dual gauge tracks than on two single gauge tracks. Dual gauge is used when there is not enough room for two single tracks or when tracks of two different gauges meet in marshalling yards or train stations.

== Background ==
The rail gauge is the most fundamental specification of a railway. Rail tracks and wheelsets are built within engineering tolerances that allow optimum lateral movement of the wheelsets between the rails. Pairs of rails that become too wide or narrow in gauge will cause derailments, especially if in excess of normal gauge-widening on curves. (Note: Two-rail track on curves is re-gauged when the gauge is 20 mm over (16 mm on narrow gauge). It is sometimes done by relocating the low (inner) rail to save "spike-killing" the sleeper at the outer end, where lateral loads are greater. In other cases, the sleeper may be slid through by about 70 mm to provide "new" timber for spiking. On dual-gauge turnouts, tolerances are small: only 8 millimetres (0.31 inches) over gauge and 2 millimetres (0.079 inches) under.)

Given the requirement for gauge to be within very tight limits, when the designed distance between the pair of wheels on a wheelset differs even slightly from that of others on a railway, track must be built to two specific gauges. That is achieved in a variety of ways: most commonly by adding a third rail, more rarely by adding another pair of rails; and rarer still, when three gauges are present, by four rails.

== Configurations ==
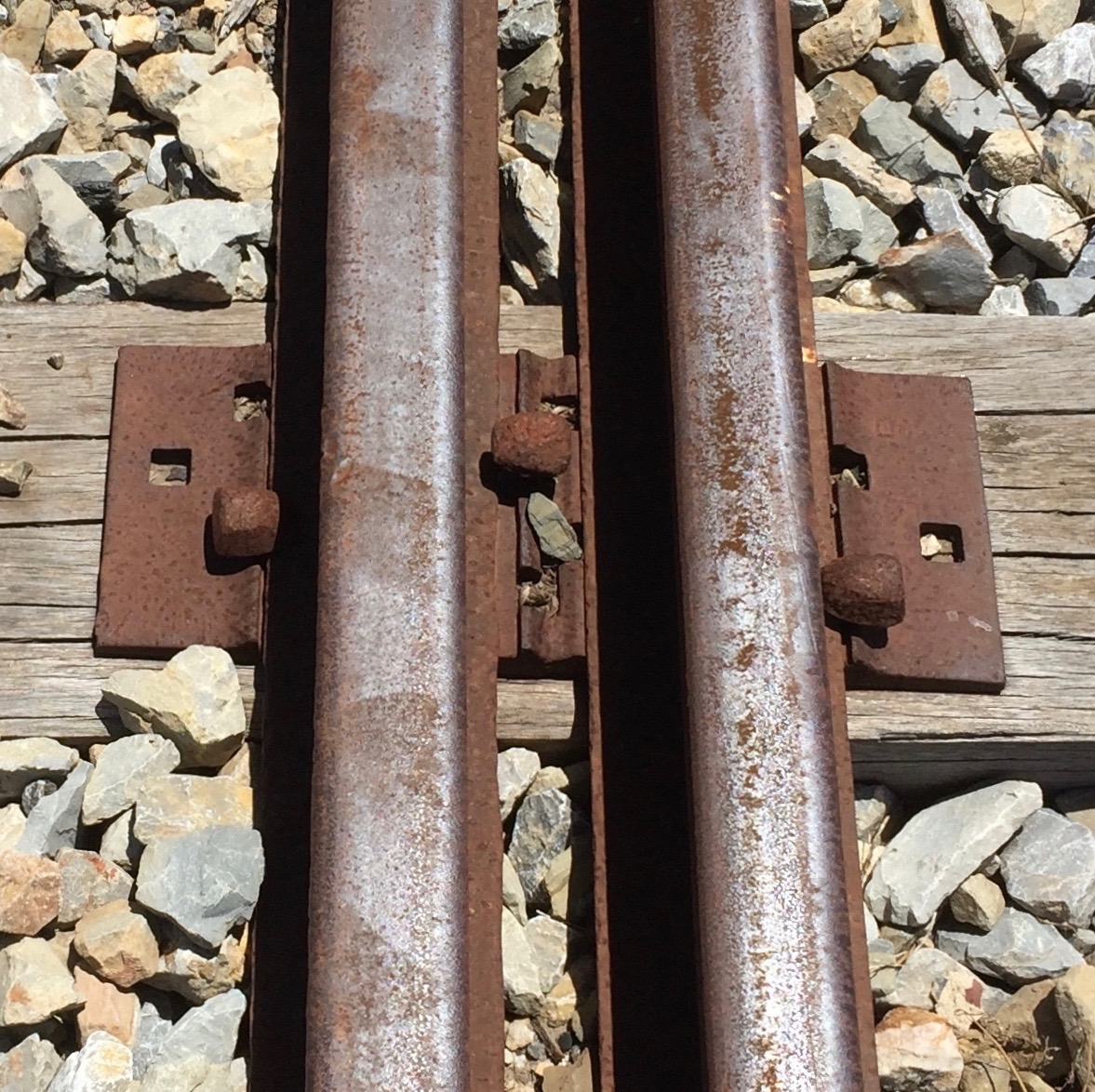
Baseplate on dual-gauge track showing the minimum practicable gap between the bases of two rails – about 40 mm (11/2 in) – which determines the minimum difference in gauges possible in a three-rail configuration

Interactive 3D view

An interactive 3D view of dual-gauge track components is
here

Dual-gauge track can consist of three rails, sharing one "common" rail; or four rails, with the rails of the narrower gauge lying between those of the broader gauge. In the three-rail configuration, wear and tear of the common rail is greater than with the two other outer rails. In dual gauge lines, turnouts (railroad switches) are more complex than in single-gauge track, and trains must be safely signalled on both of the gauges. Track circuits and mechanical interlocking must also operate on both gauges.

Multi-gauge track is very often associated with a break-of-gauge station, where rail vehicles or vehicle contents are transferred from one gauge to another. A break of gauge causes delay and increases congestion, especially on single-track lines. Essentially, two trains are required to do what a single train would normally accomplish. When traffic passes mainly in one direction, full wagons taken to the border have to be returned as empties, and a train of empty wagons has to be brought to the break of gauge from the other side to fetch the cargo. Congestion is also caused by unloading and reloading. The problem is worsened when there is a disparity between the capacity of locomotives and vehicles on the two gauges: typically, one broad-gauge trainload needs three narrow-gauge trains to carry.

=== Three rails ===
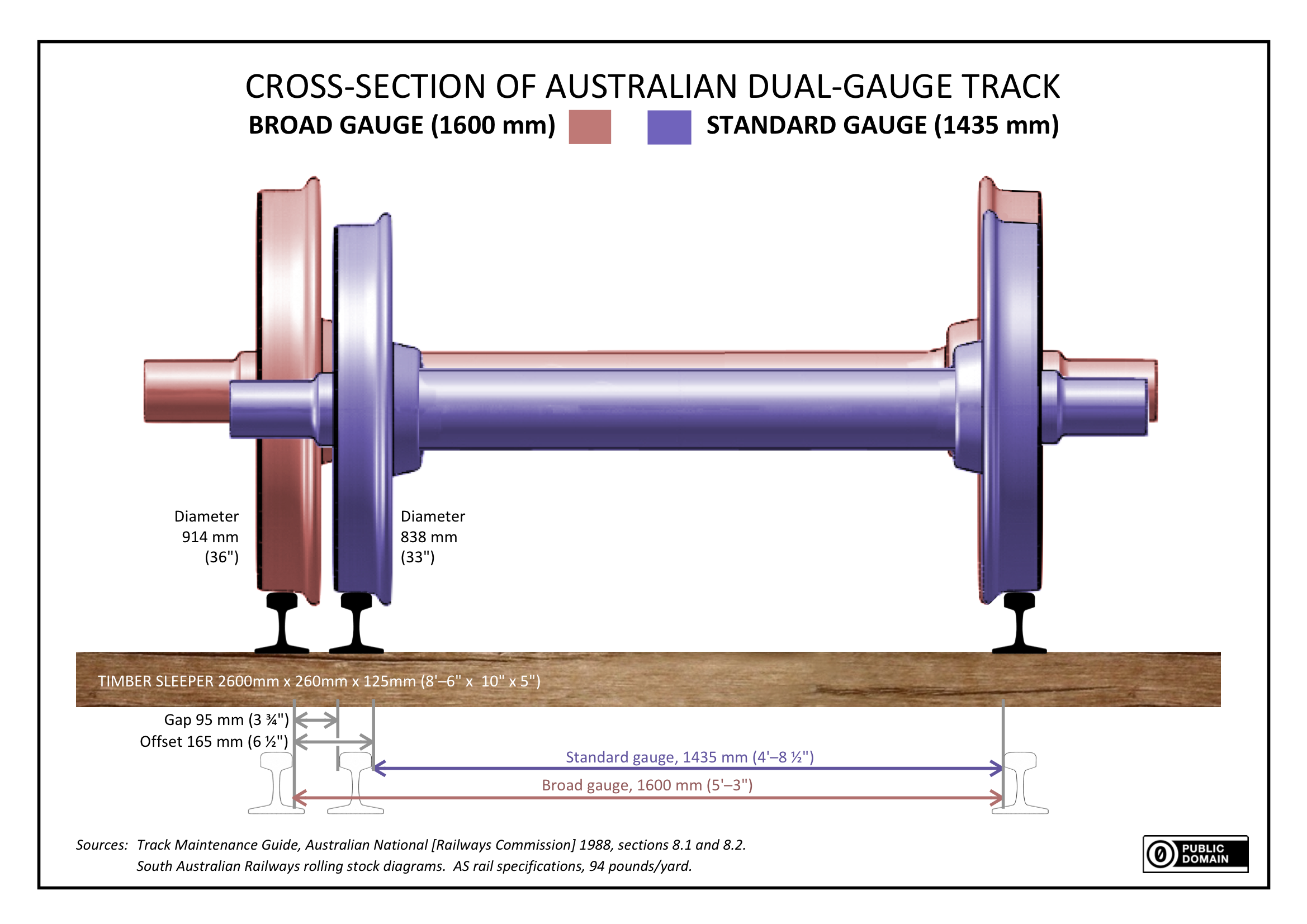
Configuration of dual-gauge (1600 mm and 1435 mm) track.

Constructing dual-gauge track with three rails is possible when the two adjacent rails can be separated at the base by at least the space required by rail fastening hardware such as spikes and or rail clips – typically 40 millimetres (1.6 inches). If the two gauges are closer than that, four rails must be used. Depending on the rail fasteners used and the weight of rails (heavy rails are bigger), the practicable difference between the two gauges is in the range 145 millimetres (5.7 inches) to 200 millimetres (7.9 inches).

Gallery: Dual gauge (3 rails)
1600 / 1000 mm (5 ft 3 / 3 ft 33/8 in) (Note: Commuter lines near Estação Central, City of Belo Horizonte, Brazil, 2007.)	1600 / 1435 mm (5 ft 3 / 4 ft 81/2 in). (Note: Secondary main line, Wallaroo, South Australia, 2008. Such close spacing of two rails is at the limit of possibilities for three-rail dual gauge; if closer, a four-rail configuration must be built.)
1435 / 891 mm (4 ft 81/2 / 2 ft 113/32 in) (Note: Jenny, Sweden, 2006.)	1435 / 1000 mm (4 ft 81/2 / 3 ft 33/8 in) (Note: Street tramway track in Liberec, Czech Republic, 2007.)
1435 / 1067 mm (4 ft 81/2 / 3 ft 6 in) (Note: Odawara on the Hakone Tozan Railway, Japan, 2005.)

=== Four rails ===
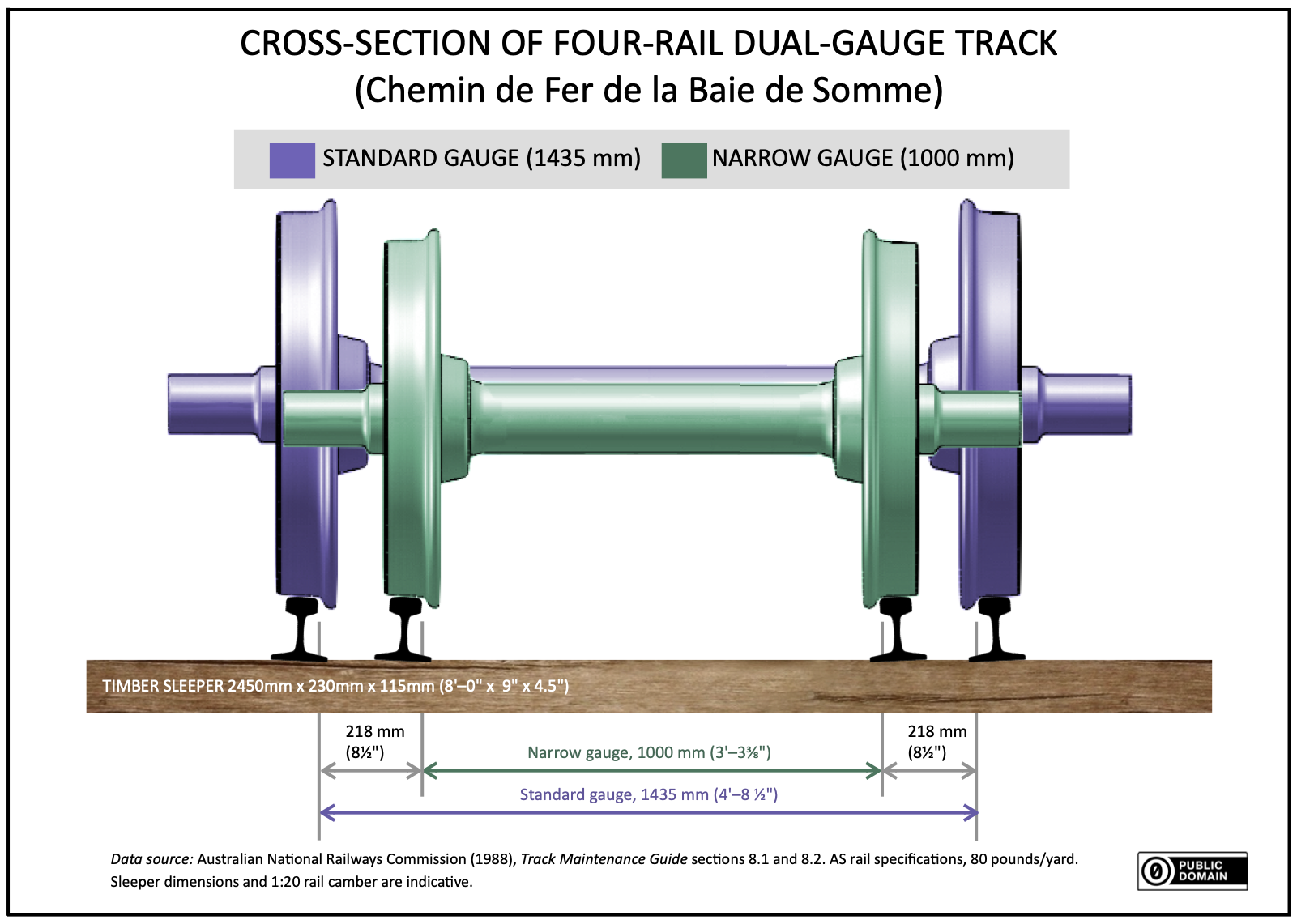
Four-rail arrangement of standard and metre gauge on the Chemin de Fer de la Baie de Somme. A 435 mm difference in gauge can also be accommodated in a three-rail configuration.

In some places, the dimensions of two gauges needing to be collocated are too close to allow a three-rail configuration – for example:

- 1000 mm (3 ft 3 3/8 in) and 1067 mm (3 ft 6 in) (common in Africa, a legacy respectively of French/Belgian and British railway practice)
- 1000 mm (3 ft 3 3/8 in) and 914 mm (3 ft) (common in South America)
- 1435 mm (4 ft 8 1/2 in) and 1524 mm (5 ft) (common where broad-gauge railways of former satellite states of the Soviet Union meet European or Chinese standard gauge).

In such cases, four rails are needed to provide the dual gauge.

Four rails might also be installed because of other engineering or operational factors, even though three rails would suffice: an example is on the Chemin de Fer de la Baie de Somme (Somme Bay railway), which combines standard and metre gauge – 435 millimetres (17.1 inches) different, well within the parameters for three rails.

Four rails are necessary where the centre-line of rail vehicles on both tracks must be closely aligned with the centre-line of the track in tunnels or other constricted locations. Such configurations, when they revert back to standard parallel lines as soon as room is available, are termed "gauntlet track" (US: "gantlet track").

Four rails must be placed identically on either side of the central axis of dual-gauge turntables (and six rails on triple-gauge turntables) so that they match the configuration of the fixed rails leading to and from the turntable, regardless of the direction in which the turntable is facing.

Gallery: Dual gauge (4 rails)
1435 / 1000 mm (4 ft 81/2 / 3 ft 338 in). In the foreground, the narrow gauge diverges via a fixed-rail configuration. (Note: Chemin de Fer de la Baie de Somme, France, 2007.)	1520 / 1435 mm (4 ft 1127/32 / 4 ft 81/2 in). The gauges of this track are as follows (numbering the rails from left to right). 1520 mm gauge: rails 1 and 3; 1435 mm gauge: rails 2 and 4. (Note: Newly laid track between Mockava and Šeštokai, Lithuania, 2013 or earlier.)
1524 / 1435 mm (5 ft 0 / 4 ft 81/2 in). A line comprising European standard gauge and "Russian" gauge, a legacy of the former satellite states of the Soviet Union. The 89 mm difference between the two gauges is too small to allow a three-rail configuration. (Note: Torne River rail bridge between Tornio (Finland) and Haparanda (Sweden, ahead), 2008.)

=== Triple gauge ===
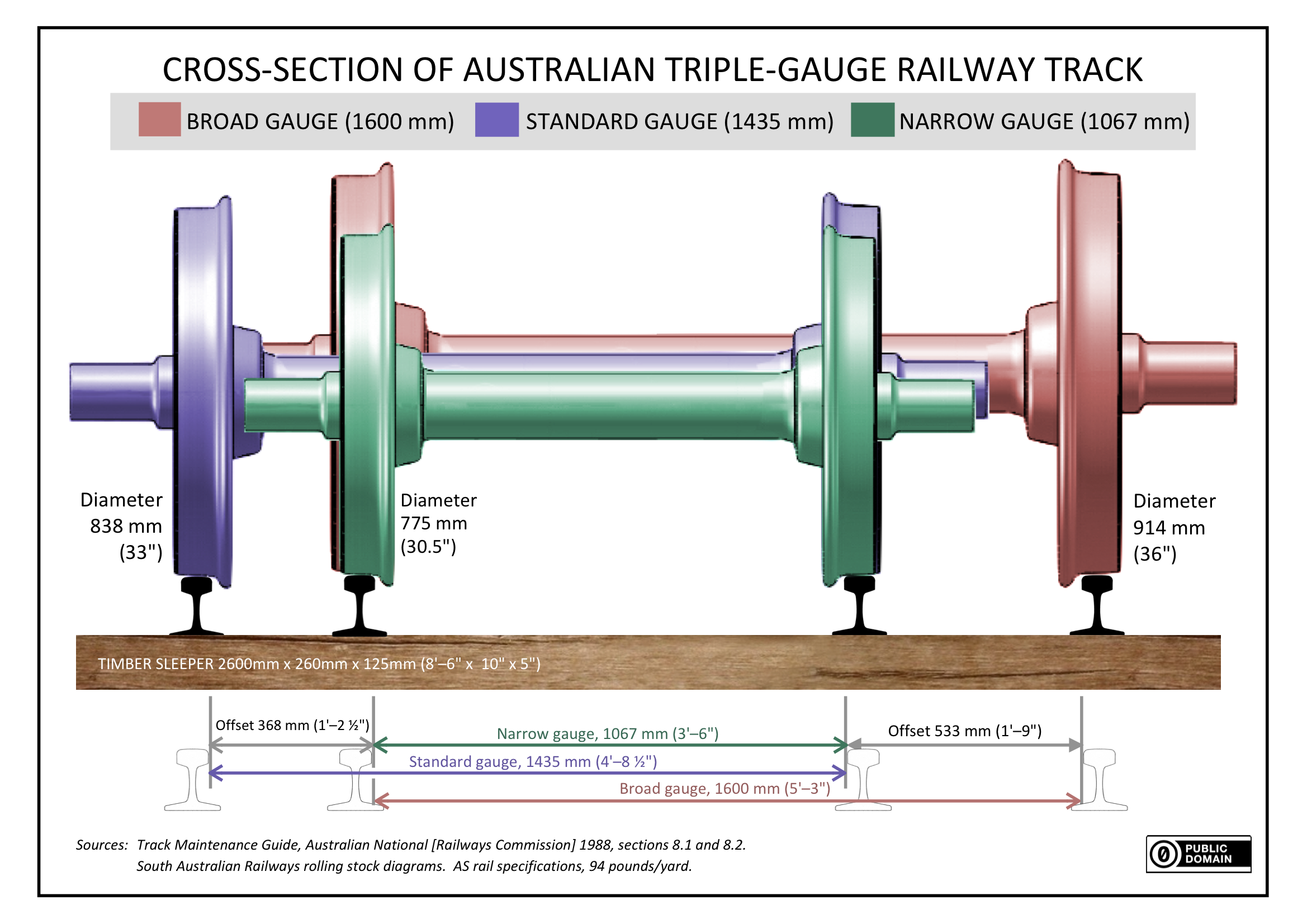
Cross-section of triple-gauge track at Gladstone and Peterborough, South Australia, before gauge standardisation. The three gauges require the respective gaps between the outer and inner rails to be different, unlike four-rail dual gauge.

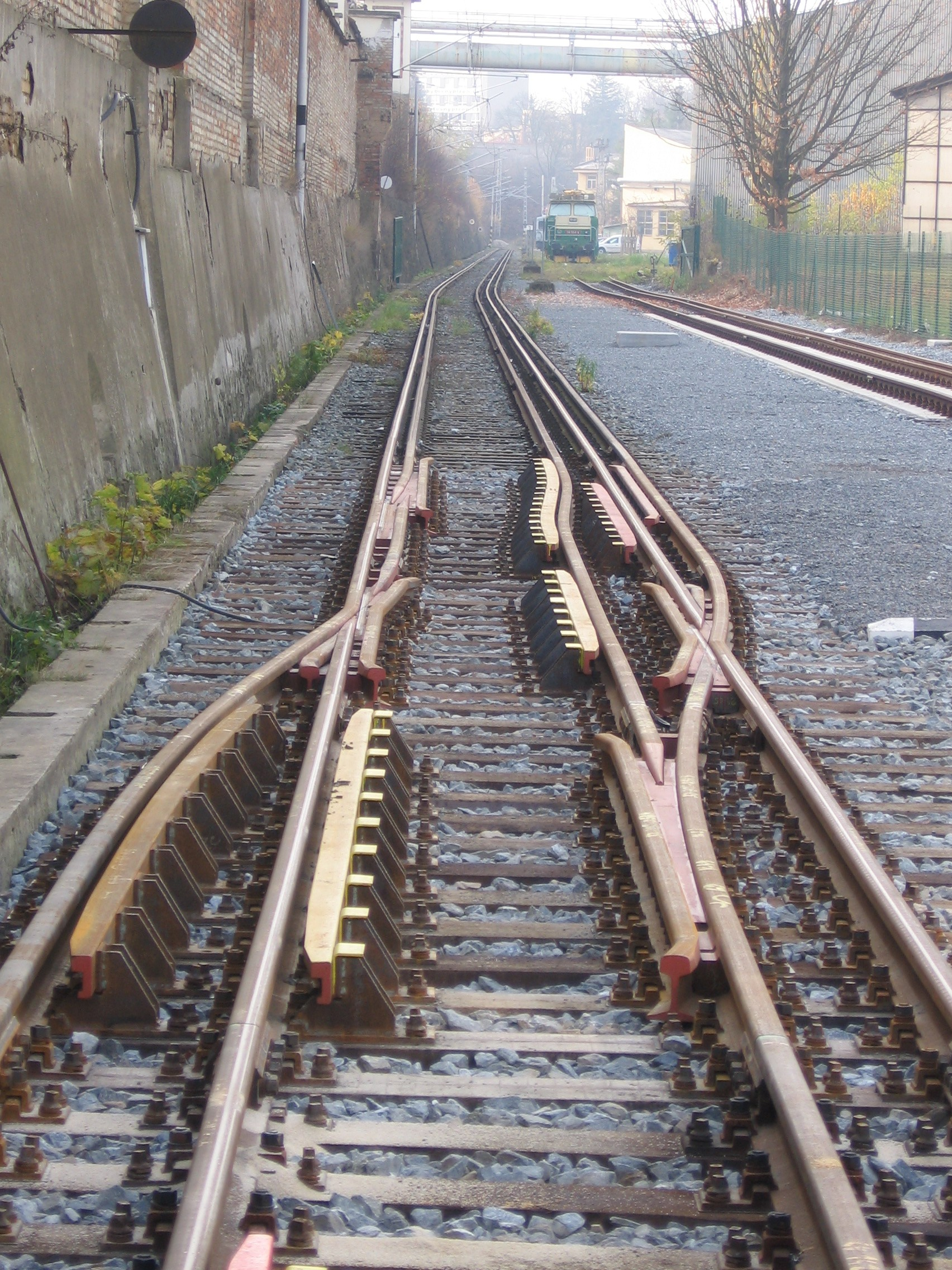
Triple-gauge for metre (1000 mm), standard (1435 mm), and Russian (1524 mm) gauges at Škoda's facility in Plzeň, Czechia. Numbering rails 1 to 5 from left to right at the top of the image and A to D at the bottom, the metre-gauge track uses rails 2/3 and B/C, the standard-gauge track uses rails 1/4 and B/D, and the Russian-gauge track uses rails 2/5 and A/C. This changeover allows to change which common rails are used by which gauges, transitioning from 4 rails to 5 rails. The metre-gauge track is configured for tram wheelsets, as can be seen by the smaller gap between rail 3 and its check rail.

In rare situations, three different gauges may converge on to a rail yard and triple-gauge track is needed to meet the operational needs of the break-of-gauge station – most commonly where there is insufficient space to do otherwise. Construction and operation of triple-gauge track and its signalling, however, involves immense cost and disruption, and is undertaken when no other alternative is available.

Gallery: Triple gauge (4 rails)
1600 / 1435 / 1067 mm (5 ft 3 / 4 ft 81/2 / 3 ft 6 in). Turnout, 4-rail triple-gauge both ways, from the points end. (Note: Gladstone, South Australia, early 1970s.)	1600 / 1435 / 1067 mm (5 ft 3 / 4 ft 81/2 / 3 ft 6 in). Turnout, 4-rail triple-gauge both ways, from the crossing end. (Note: Gladstone, South Australia, early 1970s.)
1600 / 1435 / 1067 mm (5 ft 3 / 4 ft 81/2 / 3 ft 6 in). Three-rail dual-gauge track is joined by four-rail triple-gauge. (Note: Gladstone, South Australia, early 1970s.)	1600 / 1435 / 1067mm (5 ft 3 / 4 ft 81/2 in / 3 ft 6 in). Standard-gauge car on 4-rail triple-gauge track. Narrow gauge track is two central rails; broad gauge is far left rail and second from right. (Note: Gladstone, South Australia, early 1970s.)
1600 / 1435 / 1067 mm (5 ft 3 / 4 ft 81/2 / 3 ft 6 in). A six-rail triple-gauge turntable. It must always present the same positioning of rails at both ends, so all four rails must be symmetrical to the central axis. This is made possible only by reducing the profile of the middle rail on either side. (Note: Locomotive depot, Peterborough, South Australia, 2010 (turntable was made triple-gauge in 1969 to accommodate new standard gauge).)	1600 / 1435 / 1067 mm (5 ft 3 / 4 ft 81/2 / 3 ft 6 in). When the Sydney–Perth rail corridor was converted to standard gauge in the late 1960s, dual-gauge track in the Gladstone yard had to be replaced by all-new triple-gauge track. The result was an inordinately complex marshalling yard. (Note: Gladstone railway station, 1976.)

The following table shows localities where triple gauge has been necessary.

Occurrences of triple gauge
Place	Narrowest gauge	Middle gauge	Broadest gauge	Notes
Växjö, Sweden	891 mm (2 ft 11 3/32 in)	1067 mm (3 ft 6 in)	1435 mm (4 ft 8 1/2 in)	Until 1974 or later
Barcelona, Spain	1000 mm (3 ft 3 3/8 in)	1435 mm (4 ft 8 1/2 in)	1668 mm (5 ft 5 21/32 in)	On approach to the Port of Barcelona; all three gauges still in use as of January 2026.
Gladstone, South Australia (Note: Port Pirie Junction was a triple-gauge station from 1937 to 1983 but, unlike Gladstone, did not have any triple-gauge track. For the most part the gauges were separate; dual-gauge tracks served a few trans-shipment sidings and another passenger station in the town's main street.)	1067 mm (3 ft 6 in)	1435 mm (4 ft 8 1/2 in)	1600 mm (5 ft 3 in)	1968–1983 (Some has been reconstructed at the National Railway Museum, Port Adelaide.)
Peterborough, South Australia	1067 mm (3 ft 6 in)	1435 mm (4 ft 8 1/2 in)	1600 mm (5 ft 3 in)	1968–1983. (Some has been preserved at the Steamtown Heritage Rail Centre in Peterborough.)
Toronto, Canada	1067 mm (3 ft 6 in)	1435 mm (4 ft 8 1/2 in)	1676 mm (5 ft 6 in)	Reported as impending in 1872. Subsequently converted to 1435 mm (4 ft 8 1/2 in) gauge.

Gallery: Multi-gauge devices
1600 / 1067 mm (5 ft 3 / 3 ft 6 in). A dual-gauge centraliser that directs narrow-gauge livestock cars to the centre of the broad gauge so that they can be shunted without snagging the platforms. (Note: Gladstone, South Australia, 1970s.)	1600 / 1435 mm (5 ft 3 / 4 ft 81/2 in). A simple dual-gauge common-rail change-over device. It directs standard-gauge rolling stock from the common rail in the left foreground to the right-hand rail in readiness for the turnout in the distance. (Note: Southern Cross station, Melbourne, Australia, 2010.)
1600 / 1435 / 1067 mm (5 ft 3 / 4 ft 81/2 / 3 ft 6 in). Triple-gauge common-rail change-over device: from one common rail (right foreground) to narrow gauge in the middle (in the distance). (Note: National Railway Museum, Port Adelaide, 2022. Rebuilt with components from Gladstone.)	1600 / 1435 / 1067 mm (5 ft 3 / 4 ft 81/2 / 3 ft 6 in). A four-rail triple-gauge track that joins a three-rail dual-gauge track. The change-over device in the foreground directs standard-gauge rolling stock into a four-rail configuration. (Note: Gladstone station, South Australia, 1976. The four rails in the foreground include one rail that is common to all three gauges (the rail on the right) and the gauges are as follows (numbering rails from left to right): broad gauge, 1 and 4; standard gauge, 2 and 4; narrow gauge, 3 and 4.)

=== More than three gauges ===
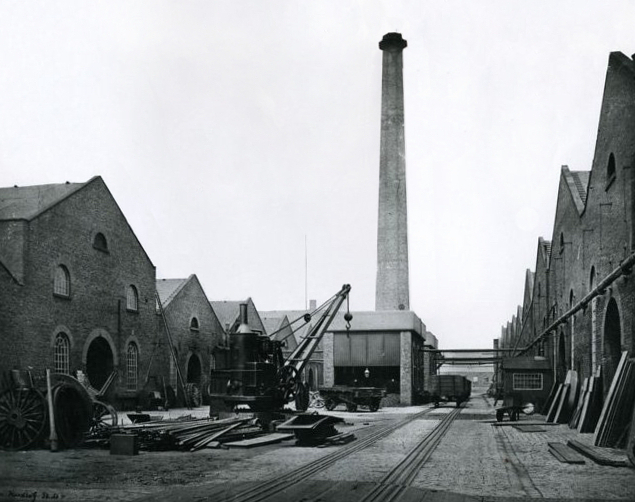
The Gorton Foundry of Beyer, Peacock & Company was typical of locomotive and rolling stock manufacturers that exported to many countries. This track of four gauges traversed two turntables, requiring the rails to be centralised.

Three gauges are the maximum found on operating railway lines and in railway yards, but some rolling stock manufacturers collocate more than three lines in their works, depending on the particular gauges of their customers.

== Alternatives ==
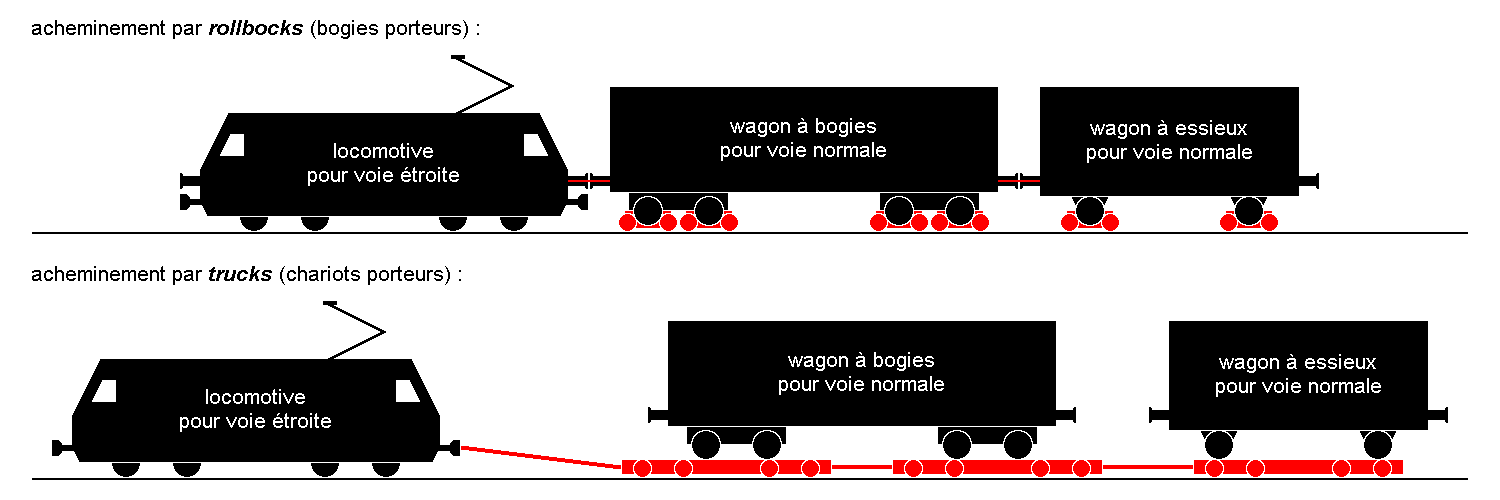
Rollbocks compared to transporter wagons

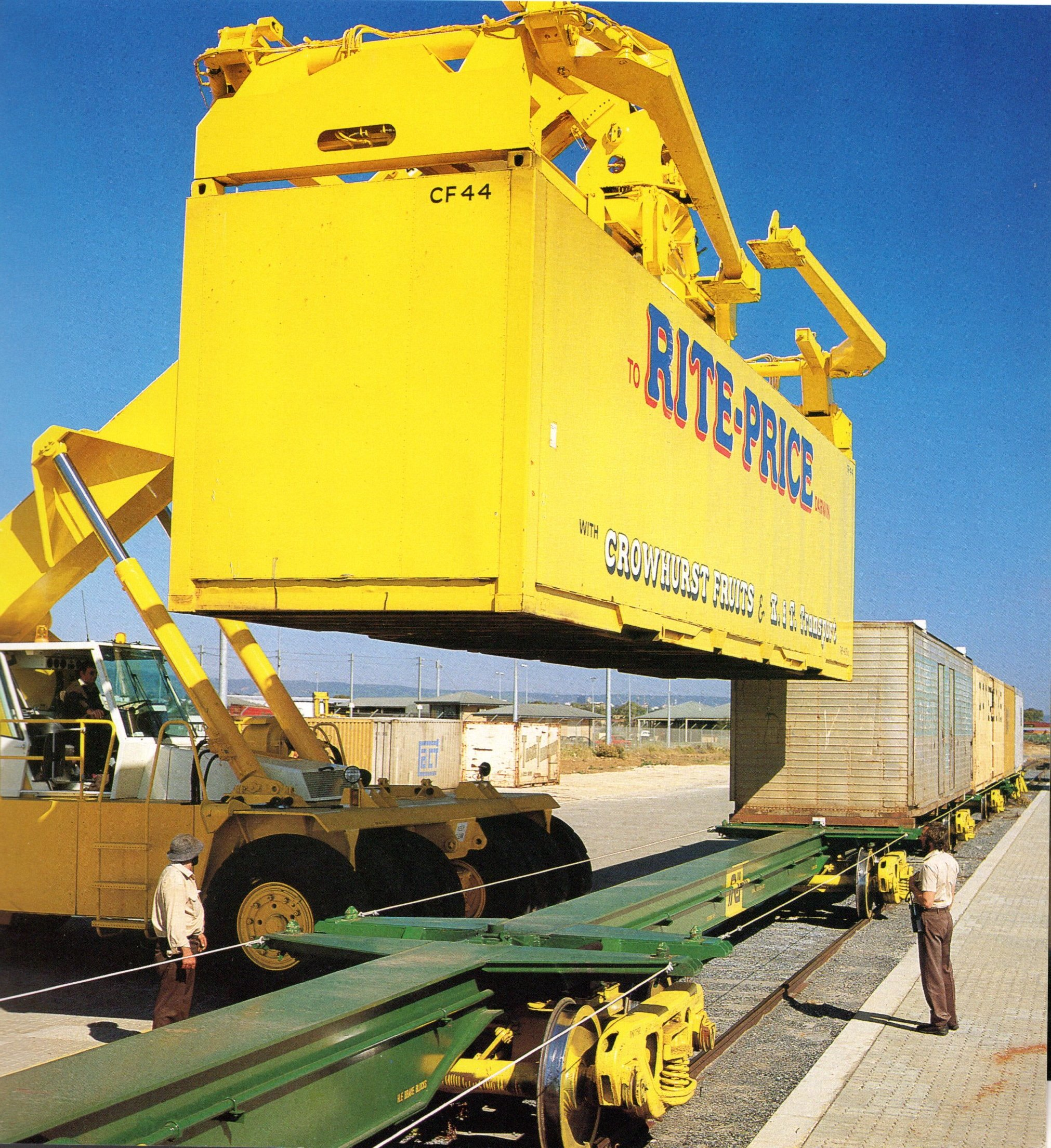
Standardised containers have revolutionised rail, road and sea freight transport. Although mechanisation has sped up handling, moving containers from one train to another because of different rail gauges is costly and inefficient.

Transfer of freight and passengers between different gauges does not necessarily involve dual-gauge track: there may simply be two tracks that approach either side of a platform without overlapping. In Australia, 13 break-of-gauge stations existed by 1945 as a result of longstanding interstate rivalries: three different gauges had persisted since the 1850s and the five mainland state capitals were not linked by standard gauge until 1995. Huge costs and long delays were imposed by trans-shipment of freight at break-of-gauge stations, whether manually, by gantry crane or by wheelset or bogie exchange. During World War II, breaks of gauge in Australia added immense difficulty to the war effort by needing extra locomotives and rolling stock, and more than 1600 service personnel and a large pool of civilians, at transfer points for an annual average transfer of about 1.8 million tonnes of freight.

To cost and inefficiency was added, in the case of passengers, considerable inconvenience. In 1896, at Albury station on the Sydney–Melbourne railway, famed American writer Samuel Clemens (Mark Twain) had to change trains in the middle of a "biting-cold" night in 1896 and there formed his pungent view of "the paralysis of intellect that gave that idea birth".

In some locations, an alternative to building long lengths of dual-gauge track has been to change the wheels on rolling stock, either by dropping and changing wheelsets from four-wheeled vehicles or exchanging bogies (US: trucks) under eight-wheeled vehicles. With this arrangement, a short length of dual-gauge track is only needed within the facility. A benefit is that the contents of fully loaded cars are not disturbed. The scheme was first adopted on the French–Spanish border and in Poland. It introduces delay into transit times compared with dual-gauge operation, but is much quicker than trans-shipping: when introduced in 1962 in Melbourne, Australia, on the route between Sydney and Adelaide, the freight handling time per train dropped from five days to less than two. The process involved disconnecting the brake rigging and bogie centre pins have to be disconnected before the vehicle is lifted and new bogies are wheeled underneath. (Note: At that time, each transfer took 20 minutes; inspection and marshalling took up the remaining time. In 1982, each of two shifts of 18 men exchanged an average of 66 bogies per day; in comparison, 100 men would have been needed to transfer the same amount of freight wagon to wagon.)

In Europe, a similar principle embodies low-profile, small-wheeled transporter wagons, which carry vehicles built for one gauge on a line with a different gauge. A variant is the rollbock, used under two-axle standard-gauge vehicles: each wheelset is carried on a small four-wheeled narrow-gauge trolley. The entire train is converted in minutes at a slow walking pace, each rollbock being automatically matched to its wheelset from underneath. (Note: The principle of attaching narrow-gauge bogies from underneath in this manner had been patented by Robert Henry Ramsey in 1872, in the United States.)

A further variant is "train on train", in which an entire narrow-gauge train is carried on standard-gauge flatcars on which continuous rail has been fitted.

Differences in gauge are also accommodated by gauge-adjustable wheelsets, which as of 2022 were installed under some passenger vehicles on international links between Spain and France, Sweden and Finland, Poland and Lithuania, and Poland and Ukraine. In Spain, change-over facilities are extensive, since although 1668 mm (5 ft 5 21/32 in) track predominates, and high-speed lines are laid to 1435 mm (4 ft 8 1/2 in) standard gauge, there are many lines with narrower gauges (1000 mm (3 ft 3 3/8 in) metre gauge and others).

== Dual-gauge railways by nation ==
Australia

In Victoria, there are sections of 1600 mm (5 ft 3 in) and 1435 mm (4 ft 8 1/2 in) dual-gauge track between Southern Cross station and West Footscray, Sunshine and Newport, Albion and Jacana, North Geelong and Gheringhap, Maryborough and Dunolly, and in various goods yards and industrial sidings. Until 2008, there was a dual-gauge line between Wodonga and Bandiana.

At Albury railway station, New South Wales, a 1600 mm (5 ft 3 in) and 1435 mm (4 ft 8 1/2 in) dual-gauge line was in place until 2011. A dual-gauge line was within Tocumwal railway station until 1988, when the standard gauge component was put out of use. Similarly Oaklands, New South Wales.

In 1900, in South Australia, a three-rail dual-gauge system was proposed in order to avoid a break of gauge. However, designing turnouts was considered to be difficult due to the difference of only 165 millimetres (6.5 inches) between the 1435 mm (4 ft 8 1/2 in) and the 1600 mm (5 ft 3 in) broad gauge. After twenty years, the proposal was abandoned. Much later, the South Australian Railways successfully adopted dual-gauge turnouts.

In Western Australia, 1067 mm (3 ft 6 in) and 1435 mm (4 ft 8 1/2 in) of double-track dual-gauge extends for 120 km (75 mi) of the main line from East Perth to Northam. Dual-gauge track is also used from the triangle at Woodbridge to Cockburn Junction, then to Kwinana on one branch and North Fremantle on the other. The signalling system detects the gauge of the approaching train and puts the signals to stop if the route is set for the wrong gauge.

In Queensland, there is a section of 1067 mm (3 ft 6 in) and 1435 mm (4 ft 8 1/2 in) dual-gauge track between the rail freight yards at Acacia Ridge and Boggo Road station, which is utilised by both passenger and freight trains. Freight trains to the Port of Brisbane utilise the dual gauge Fisherman Islands line that runs parallel to the Cleveland railway line from Park Road to Lindum. Passenger trains use the dual-gauge section of the Beenleigh railway line running parallel to the electric suburban narrow gauge of the Queensland Rail city network over the Merivale Bridge into platforms 2 and 3 at Roma Street station. This is used by standard gauge interstate NSW TrainLink XPT services to Sydney. In 2012, a dual-gauge line was installed between Acacia Ridge and Bromelton to serve a new freight hub at Bromelton.

The 1700 kilometres (1100 miles) long Inland Railway, under construction in 2022, will have about 300 kilometres (190 miles) of dual gauge for 1435mm and 1067mm gauges.

Bangladesh

The Bangladesh Railway uses three rails to avoid breaks of gauge between its broad-gauge and metre-gauge lines. The Jamuna Bridge and Padma Bridge, which link the east–west and north–south rail systems respectively, have four-rail dual-gauge tracks. Of the 2,875 kilometres (1,786 mi) Bangladesh Railway system, about 1,600 kilometres (990 mi) has four-rail dual-gauge.

Belgium

Tram tracks in Brussels once combined 1000 mm (3 ft 3 3/8 in) metre gauge lines for inter-urban trams and 1435 mm (4 ft 8 1/2 in) lines for urban trams in a three-rail layout. In 1991, the interurban trams went out of service and then the network used only standard-gauge track.

Brazil

This country has some 1600mm-1000mm existing and under construction dual gauge tracks.

Bulgaria

The Sofia tramway uses a mixture of narrow and standard gauge. A 2.6 km (1.6 mi) section of track between Krasna polyana depot and Pirotska street is dual-gauge shared by 1435 mm (4 ft 8 1/2 in) route 22 and 1009 mm (3 ft 3 23/32 in) route 11.

Cameroon

The new port of Kribi may serve 1000mm gauge bauxite traffic as well as 1435mm gauge iron ore traffic.

Czech Republic

In the Czech Republic, there is 2 km of dual gauge 1435 mm (4 ft 8 1/2 in) and 760 mm (2 ft 5 15/16 in) track near Jindřichův Hradec. In 1985, its original four rails were converted to three rails. In 2004, in Jindřichův Hradec at a switch where a dual gauge railway bifurcates, a Junák express from Plzeň to Brno derailed due to a signalling error. The standard gauge train had been switched on to the narrow gauge track.

France

The Chemin de Fer de la Baie de Somme in France is dual gauge between Noyelles-sur-Mer and Saint-Valery-sur-Somme. The line has four rails with metre gauge laid within standard gauge. There are some dual-gauge (standard and Iberian) sidings at Cerbère on the Spanish border.

Germany

In the 1970s, the Stuttgarter Straßenbahnen tram lines underwent a gauge conversion from 1000 mm (3 ft 3 3/8 in) gauge to standard gauge. This was part of an upgrade to the Stuttgart Stadtbahn. In 1981, 1435 mm (4 ft 8 1/2 in) and 1000 mm (3 ft 3 3/8 in) dual-gauge track was constructed so that new DT-8 Stadtbahn cars and old trams could share the network. In 2008, a further gauge conversion was completed. The Stuttgart Straßenbahn Museum operates 1000 mm (3 ft 3 3/8 in) gauge trams on weekends and special occasions.

In Krefeld on Ostwall, tram lines are dual gauge so that standard 1435 mm (4 ft 8 1/2 in) Rheinbahn U76 Stadtbahn cars and 1000 mm (3 ft 3 3/8 in) gauge trams may share the lines. At the north end of the route, at the junction with Rheinstraße, the trams reverse. There, the standard gauge line ends, while the metre gauge lines continue. At the Hauptbahnhof, on Oppumer Straße, dual gauge track continues. At the ends of Oppumer Straße, the two tracks diverge.

In Mülheim there is a similar situation. The Duisburg tram line 901 meets the local line 102. The tram system in Duisburg uses 1435 mm (4 ft 8 1/2 in) gauge track while the tram route from Witten to Mülheim uses 1000 mm (3 ft 3 3/8 in) gauge tracks. Two lines share a tunnel section between the Mülheim (Ruhr) Hauptbahnhof and Schloss Broich then diverge at street level.

The tram network between Werne to Bad Honnef is large with various operators and gauges. The trams in Wuppertal used 1435 mm (4 ft 8 1/2 in) gauge track on east–west lines and 1000 mm (3 ft 3 3/8 in) gauge track on north–south lines. Trams in Duisburg used 1435 mm (4 ft 8 1/2 in) gauge track on lines south of the Ruhr and 1000 mm (3 ft 3 3/8 in) gauge tracks on lines north of the Ruhr. The north lines closed in the 1960s and 1970s. Duisburg's three routes were converted to 1435 mm (4 ft 8 1/2 in) gauge track.

Ghana

Ghana is converting its 1067mm narrow gauge to 1435mm standard gauge, and is installing dual-gauge sleepers as an intermediate stage. Some narrow gauge remains for suburban passenger services.

Greece

In Greece, the line between Athens and Elefsis (now closed) was dual gauge in order to allow the 1000 mm (3 ft 3 3/8 in) gauge trains of the Peloponnese rail network to pass. It also allowed standard gauge trains to reach the Elefsis shipyards. In Volos, a short section of track between the main station and the harbour used an unusual triple gauge, to accommodate standard gauge trains from Larissa, metre gauge trains from Kalambaka, and the 600 mm (1 ft 11 5/8 in) gauge trains of the Pelion railway.

Indonesia

In 1899, in the Dutch East Indies, dual gauge track was installed between Yogyakarta and Solo. The track was owned by the Nederlandsch-Indische Spoorweg Maatschappij, a private company, which in 1867 had built the 1435 mm (4 ft 8 1/2 in) gauge line. The third rail was installed to allow passengers and goods travelling over the 1067 mm (3 ft 6 in) gauge Staatsspoorweg (state railway) a direct connection. At a later date, the government constructed new tracks to allow greater capacity and higher speeds. In 1940, a third rail was installed between Solo and Gundih on the line to Semarang, allowing 1067 mm (3 ft 6 in) gauge trains to travel between Semarang, Solo and Yogyakarta via Gambringan, on the line to Surabaya instead of on the original line via Kedungjati.

In 1942 and 1943 in Java, under Japanese military occupation, conversion took place from 4 ft 8 1/2 in (1,435 mm) to 1067 mm (3 ft 6 in) on the Brumbung–Kedungjati–Gundih main line and the Kedungjati–Ambarawa branch line.

Until the 1970s, a short section of dual gauge 1067 mm (3 ft 6 in) and 750 mm (2 ft 5 1/2 in) line existed in North Sumatra on a joint line of the Deli Railway and the Atjeh Tram.

Some sugar mill railways in Java have some dual-gauge sections.

Ireland

Ireland's Ulster Railway underwent a gauge conversion from 1880mm to the new Irish standard of 1600 mm (5 ft 3 in). The Dublin & Drogheda Railway underwent a gauge conversion because the gauges were too close to allow a dual-gauge line.

Italy

The Potenza – Avigliano Lucania line in Italy is a dual gauge rail with 1435 mm (4 ft 8 1/2 in) and 950 mm (3 ft 1 3/8 in) tracks.

Japan

In Japan, the national standard is 1067 mm (3 ft 6 in) narrow gauge. Dual gauge is used where the 1435 mm (4 ft 8 1/2 in) Shinkansen (bullet train) lines join the main network. For example, part of the Ōu Main Line became part of the Akita Shinkansen and was converted to dual gauge in a limited section. The longest (82.1 km (51.0 mi)) dual gauge section in Japan is near, and in, the Seikan Tunnel. Sections of the Hakone Tozan Line are among a number of other dual-gauge lines.

Mexico

Mexico previously had 1435 mm (4 ft 8 1/2 in) and 914 mm (3 ft) dual gauge track.

Netherlands

The first railway lines in the Netherlands were constructed with a track gauge of 1945 mm (6 ft 4 9/16 in). For the 1939 centennial celebration, an exact replica of the country's first locomotive "De Arend" was built using the original blueprints. Since 1953, the locomotive is housed at the Dutch National Railway Museum, where in recent years, a dual-gauge track has been constructed in the rail yard, allowing for the locomotive to drive back and forth on special occasions.

Poland

In Poland, there is 3 kilometres (1.9 miles) of 1435 mm (4 ft 8 1/2 in) and 750 mm (2 ft 5 1/2 in) dual-gauge track in the Greater Poland Voivodeship, linking Pleszew with a nearby mainline station. It is served by narrow-gauge passenger trains and standard-gauge freight trains.

Portugal

In Portugal there were sections of dual gauge railways

In Douro Line with Corgo Line, between Régua railway station and Corgo bifurcation, over a length of 1,100 m. The Corgo Line is currently closed for operation.

In Minho Line between Trofa and Famalicão the meter gauge Guimarães line run inside the 1,668 m iberian gauge in an extension of 10 km. This section has been dismantled in 2004 with the regauging of Guimarães Line and duplication and electrification of the Minho line between Ermesinde and Braga.

Russia

Between 2008 and 2012, a 2 km (1.2 mi) dual-gauge cross-border track was rebuilt between Khasan, Russia, and Rajin, North Korea; its gauges were the Russian 1520 mm (4 ft 11 27/32 in) and Korean 1435 mm (4 ft 8 1/2 in). Similar arrangements exist on the approach to Kaliningrad, where 1435 mm (4 ft 8 1/2 in) track extends from the Polish border with some sections of dual gauge.

Spain

In Spain, there is 21.7 km (13.5 mi) of dual gauge in the AVE line from Zaragoza to Huesca, usable for both 1435 mm (4 ft 8 1/2 in) standard-gauge high-speed trains and 1668 mm (5 ft 5 21/32 in) Spanish network trains. Some dual-gauge sidings are at Port Bou on the French border. In 2009, Adif called for tenders for the installation of a third rail for standard-gauge trains on the 22 km (14 mi) between Castellbisbal and the Can Tunis freight terminal in Barcelona.

Sweden

The bridges at the borders of Sweden and Finland, between Haparanda and Tornio have 2 km (1.2 mi) of dual gauge, 1435 mm (4 ft 8 1/2 in) and 1524 mm (5 ft) track. At each end of the dual-gauge section are yards with standard and Finnish gauge areas to allow for trans-shipment. Four rails are used because the gauges are close and the bridge structure is wider than normal to allow for the offset from the centreline of each gauge. A Rafil gauge changer is at the Tornio yard. Between Västervik and Jenny, Sweden, there is a 891 mm (2 ft 11 3/32 in) and 1435 mm (4 ft 8 1/2 in) dual-gauge line and dual-gauge track in the Västervik station area.

Switzerland

In Switzerland, dual-gauge 1435 mm (4 ft 8 1/2 in) track and 1000 mm (3 ft 3 3/8 in) track exists between Lucerne and Horw of the Zentralbahn, between Niederbipp and Oberbipp of the Oberaargau-Jura Railways and between Chur and Domat/Ems of RhB. All three allow narrow-gauge passenger trains and standard-gauge freight trains to operate. A ″non-stop″ scheme (albeit with a pause to change locomotives) on the Montreux-Interlaken route was inaugurated in December 2022. The former Zollikofen-Worblaufen-Deisswil dual gauge was cut back to Papiermühle when the factory in Deisswil closed.

Ukraine

The railway tracks between the border with Slovakia at Solomonovo and the border with Romania at Nevetlenfolu are dual-gauge, 1520 mm (4 ft 11 27/32 in) and 1435 mm (4 ft 8 1/2 in). This is in part due to the Austro-Hungarian heritage of the Zakarpattia Oblast, but also has military and political importance, as it allows standard-gauge trains to run between Romania and Slovakia by bypassing Hungary, otherwise impossible due to the break-of -gauge between the Russian-gauge network of Ukraine and standard-gauge networks of Romania and Slovakia.

United Kingdom

The Great Western Railway in Britain was originally built to a broad gauge of 2134 mm (7 ft 0 in), subsequently widened to 2140 mm (7 ft 0 1/4 in). After a "gauge war", the gauge was converted to 1435 mm (4 ft 8 1/2 in). A dual-gauge system was easily installed as the gauges were well separated and the line had wooden sleepers. A short section of broad and standard gauge is at the Great Western Society site at Didcot.

The port authority in Derry, Northern Ireland, used a dual-gauge line in a street-level network to transfer freight. Two of the city's stations were on a narrow 914 mm (3 ft) gauge. The other two city stations were on broad 1600 mm (5 ft 3 in) gauge.

The Fairbourne Railway in Gwynedd, Wales, has a section of dual gauge track from Fairbourne station to Car Park crossing installed in the late 2010s to allow visiting 15 in (381 mm) gauge trains to run on part of the line, which was converted to 12 1/4 in (311 mm) gauge in 1986, usually as part of special events.

United States

In Los Angeles, the 1067 mm (3 ft 6 in) Los Angeles Railway and 1435 mm (4 ft 8 1/2 in) Pacific Electric Railway ran on dual gauge track on some downtown streets.

From 1880 to 1902, the Burlington, Cedar Rapids and Northern Railway (standard gauge) and the Burlington and Northwestern Railway (narrow gauge) shared a dual-gauge mainline from Burlington, Iowa, to Mediapolis, 23 kilometres (14 miles) to the north.

The early operational years of the State Belt Railroad in San Francisco featured dual-gauge tracks to accommodate regional railroads of the time, which interchanged via ferry.

Until 1941, the Colorado and Southern Railway used both standard-gauge and narrow-gauge tracks, and had a dual-gauge line between Denver and Golden, Colorado.

Until the 1960s, the Denver and Rio Grande Western Railroad's Alamosa–Durango Line from Alamosa, Colorado, to Antonito was dual-gauge (914 mm (3 ft) and 1435 mm (4 ft 8 1/2 in)).

Previously, in its yard at Mount Union, Pennsylvania, the East Broad Top Railroad and Coal Company used dual-gauge tracks.

Vietnam

In Vietnam, near the border with China, there is 1000 mm (3 ft 3 3/8 in) and 1435 mm (4 ft 8 1/2 in) dual-gauge track between Hanoi and Đồng Đăng. Other smaller dual-gauge sections exist elsewhere in the north-east of the country.

== See also ==
- Glossary of rail transport terms
- History of rail transport
- Rail transport
- Rail transport by country
- Tamping machine
- Track gauge conversion
