= Tallangatta =

- Town
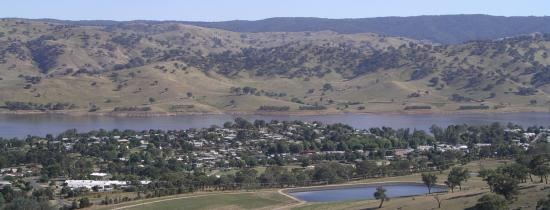
- Tallangatta viewed from the town lookout in January 2004. The Mitta arm of Lake Hume can be seen behind the town

- Interactive map of Tallangatta
- Coordinates: 36°13′00″S 147°10′40″E
- Country: Australia
- State: Victoria
- Region: Hume
- LGA: Shire of Towong
- Location: 349 km (217 mi) NE of Melbourne; 38 km (24 mi) SE of Wodonga

Government
  - State electorate: Benambra
  - Federal division: Indi
- Elevation: 184 m (604 ft)

Population
  - Total: 1,175 (2021 census)
- Postcode: 3700
- Mean max temp: 21.6 °C (70.9 °F)
- Mean min temp: 10.0 °C (50.0 °F)
- Annual rainfall: 701.6 mm (27.62 in)

Tallangatta (/təˈlæŋɡətə/ tə-LANG-gə-tə) is a town in north-eastern Victoria, Australia. The town lies on the banks of the Mitta Arm of Lake Hume, approximately 38 kilometres (24 mi) south-east of Albury-Wodonga along the Murray Valley Highway. At the 2021 census, Tallangatta had a population of 1,175.

== History ==
Tallangatta was founded in the 1870s, the Post Office opening on 15 May 1871.

On the arrival of the railway it served as a rail gateway for the Mitta and Upper Murray valleys (the Upper Murray only until the railway was extended to Cudgewa). Some gold and tin mining occurred in the late 19th and early 20th century, though, unlike Beechworth, little evidence of this remains. The amount of gold produced was relatively small compared to other mines elsewhere in the region.

Since that time, Tallangatta has been a service centre for the local farming community, with a butter factory operating throughout much of the 20th century. Improved road transport links finally ended both the dairy and the rail link in the 1970s (with dairy processing operations now concentrated in Tangambalanga, about 15 kilometres (9 mi) to the west).

The most distinctive aspect of the town's history is that it was moved 8 kilometres (5 mi) to the west in the 1950s to a site known as Bolga to allow for the expansion of Lake Hume. Stories of the transition from old town to new town were captured in the 1988 book Slates and Suet Puddings by Carmyl Winkler. On 14 April 1955 the Post Office was renamed Tallangatta East and a new Tallangatta office opened at the new town location. The sign welcoming motorists to town reads "Tallangatta, the town that moved in the 1950s".

Tallangatta is also known for having its own ski club, Tallangatta and District Ski Club, near the summit of Mt Wills; founded in 1948, the club continues to maintain an active membership.

The Tallangatta Magistrates' Court closed on 1 January 1990.

== Climate ==
Tallangatta possesses a humid subtropical climate (Köppen: Cfa), with very warm, relatively dry summers and cool, wet winters. Average maxima vary from 30.9 °C (87.6 °F) in January to 12.3 °C (54.1 °F) in July while average minima fluctuate between 16.7 °C (62.1 °F) in January and 4.1 °C (39.4 °F) in July. Mean precipitation is moderate (averaging 701.6 mm (27.62 in) per annum). Tallangatta receives 111.6 precipitation days annually, with its frequency peaking in winter. The town experiences 111.4 clear days and 145.1 cloudy days per annum. Extreme temperatures have ranged from 45.5 °C (113.9 °F) on 31 January 2020 to −2.8 °C (27.0 °F) on 26 July 1986. All climate data was sourced from Hume Dam, situated 18.4 km (11.4 mi) northwest of Tallangatta.

Climate data for Tallangatta (sourced from Hume Dam) (36.10°S 147.03°E, 184 m AMSL) (1922-2024 normals, extremes 1965-2024)
Month	Jan	Feb	Mar	Apr	May	Jun	Jul	Aug	Sep	Oct	Nov	Dec	Year
Record high °C (°F)	45.5 (113.9)	44.9 (112.8)	39.2 (102.6)	34.8 (94.6)	28.2 (82.8)	21.6 (70.9)	21.3 (70.3)	24.3 (75.7)	30.7 (87.3)	35.2 (95.4)	40.5 (104.9)	42.1 (107.8)	45.5 (113.9)
Mean daily maximum °C (°F)	30.9 (87.6)	30.5 (86.9)	27.1 (80.8)	21.8 (71.2)	16.8 (62.2)	13.1 (55.6)	12.3 (54.1)	14.3 (57.7)	17.5 (63.5)	21.1 (70.0)	25.1 (77.2)	28.7 (83.7)	21.6 (70.9)
Mean daily minimum °C (°F)	16.7 (62.1)	16.6 (61.9)	14.0 (57.2)	10.1 (50.2)	7.0 (44.6)	4.9 (40.8)	4.1 (39.4)	5.0 (41.0)	6.7 (44.1)	9.2 (48.6)	11.8 (53.2)	14.5 (58.1)	10.1 (50.1)
Record low °C (°F)	6.8 (44.2)	6.7 (44.1)	3.6 (38.5)	1.1 (34.0)	−1.7 (28.9)	−2.7 (27.1)	−2.8 (27.0)	−2.3 (27.9)	−1.8 (28.8)	1.2 (34.2)	2.8 (37.0)	4.4 (39.9)	−2.8 (27.0)
Average precipitation mm (inches)	50.6 (1.99)	41.8 (1.65)	47.4 (1.87)	51.8 (2.04)	58.3 (2.30)	67.3 (2.65)	75.5 (2.97)	75.4 (2.97)	61.0 (2.40)	67.6 (2.66)	55.4 (2.18)	49.4 (1.94)	701.6 (27.62)
Average precipitation days (≥ 0.2 mm)	5.7	5.3	5.9	7.2	10.3	12.6	14.5	13.8	11.2	10.2	8.2	6.7	111.6
Source: Bureau of Meteorology (1922-2024 normals, extremes 1965-2024)

== Population ==
According to the 2021 Census the population of Tallangatta is 1,175 however the town also serves as a hub for nearby farming communities including Bullioh, Tallangatta Valley, Old Tallangatta, and Tallandoon, which account for an additional population of more than 500 residents.

Of these:

- Aboriginal and Torres Strait Islander people made up 1.9% of the population
- 82.8% of people were born in Australia. 3.2% of the population were born in England, 0.9% in Malaysia, 0.7% in the United States of America, 0.6% in Scotland and 0.5% in Samoa.
- 89.7% of people spoke only English at home, with the next most common language being Samoan, spoken by 1.0% of the population.
- The most common responses for religion were No Religion 40.1%, Anglican 18.2% Catholic 14.4%, and Uniting Church 5.4%.

== Economy ==
Beef and dairy cattle farming is the dominant industry, with a small abattoir. In 2016, Tallangatta was declared a "Notable Town", by Heritage Australia. Services include a small hospital, and two primary schools, a secondary school and an integrated childcare, library and community centre. A considerable number of residents now commute to work in Albury–Wodonga.

The decline of the water frontage of Lake Hume, due to sporadic drought conditions and the privatisation of Australia waterways, has had an impact on the town. Although through initiatives, such as the Tallangatta Tomorrow project funded by state government, the township is experiencing a new lease on life.

Several community-focused initiatives operate within the township including Tallangatta Food Swap, Boomerang Bags Tallangatta, the Tallangatta Community Theatre Group, the Uniting Church Op Shop, and Plasticwise Tallangatta.

The town has a high proportion of retirees, with some elderly people cared for at Bolga Court Hostel. This heritage is celebrated in the popular annual Tallangatta Fifties Festival; however, as of June 2018, has ended due to financial concerns and feedback.

== Transport ==
A single bus service between Tallangatta and Albury via Wodonga (operated by Transport Victoria) departs from the Tallangatta Information Centre (Triqngles Park) each Friday ending at QEII Square/Dean St in Albury. The town is mainly accessed via the Murray Valley Highway; the northern terminus of the Omeo Highway to Omeo is approximately 5 km (3.1 mi) east of the town.

The High Country Rail Trail passes through the town; it follows the route of the Cudgewa railway line, which closed in 1981.

== Sport ==
Tallangatta is a regional hub for equestrian sports, most notably hosting the annual National Team Yarding Championship. The event is organized by the Upper Murray Horseman’s Association (UMHA) and held at the Tallangatta Showgrounds, attracting competitors from across Australia.

The town serves as the headquarters for the Tallangatta & District Football League (TDFL). Established in 1945, the league is a notable Australian rules football and netball competition in North East Victoria, comprising several clubs from the surrounding river valleys. The town is home to the Tallangatta Football Club.

Rugby union is represented by the Bogong Rugby Club, which hosts an annual Tallangatta 7's tournament at the local showgrounds, drawing teams from regional Victoria and New South Wales.

Historically, Tallangatta maintained a field hockey team; however, the club is no longer active, and the former hockey fields currently remain vacant.

Tennis is played at the Tallangatta Tennis Club on Akuna Avenue. However, the Georges Creek Tennis Club, located at Old Tallangatta, maintains a higher level of community activity, fielding multiple teams in the Kiewa and Talgarno Districts Tennis Association (KTDTA).

== Education ==
Tallangatta has secondary and primary educational services for the town and the surrounding rural districts through several key institutions:

- Tallangatta Primary School provides primary education for the area.
- Tallangatta Secondary College is a state high school offering education for students from Year 7 through Year 12.
- The Tallangatta Integrated Community Centre, operated by the local council, houses the town's kindergarten and daycare facilities.

== Notable residents ==
- Phillip Law, scientist and Antarctic explorer was born in Tallangatta in 1912
- Doug Smith, North Melbourne footballer grew up in Tallangatta
- William Yates, a politician who served in both the British and Australian parliaments, spent his last years in Tallangatta
- Ian Trevaskis, writer and author; Children's Book Council of Australia award-winning author
