= City of Wodonga =

- Local government area
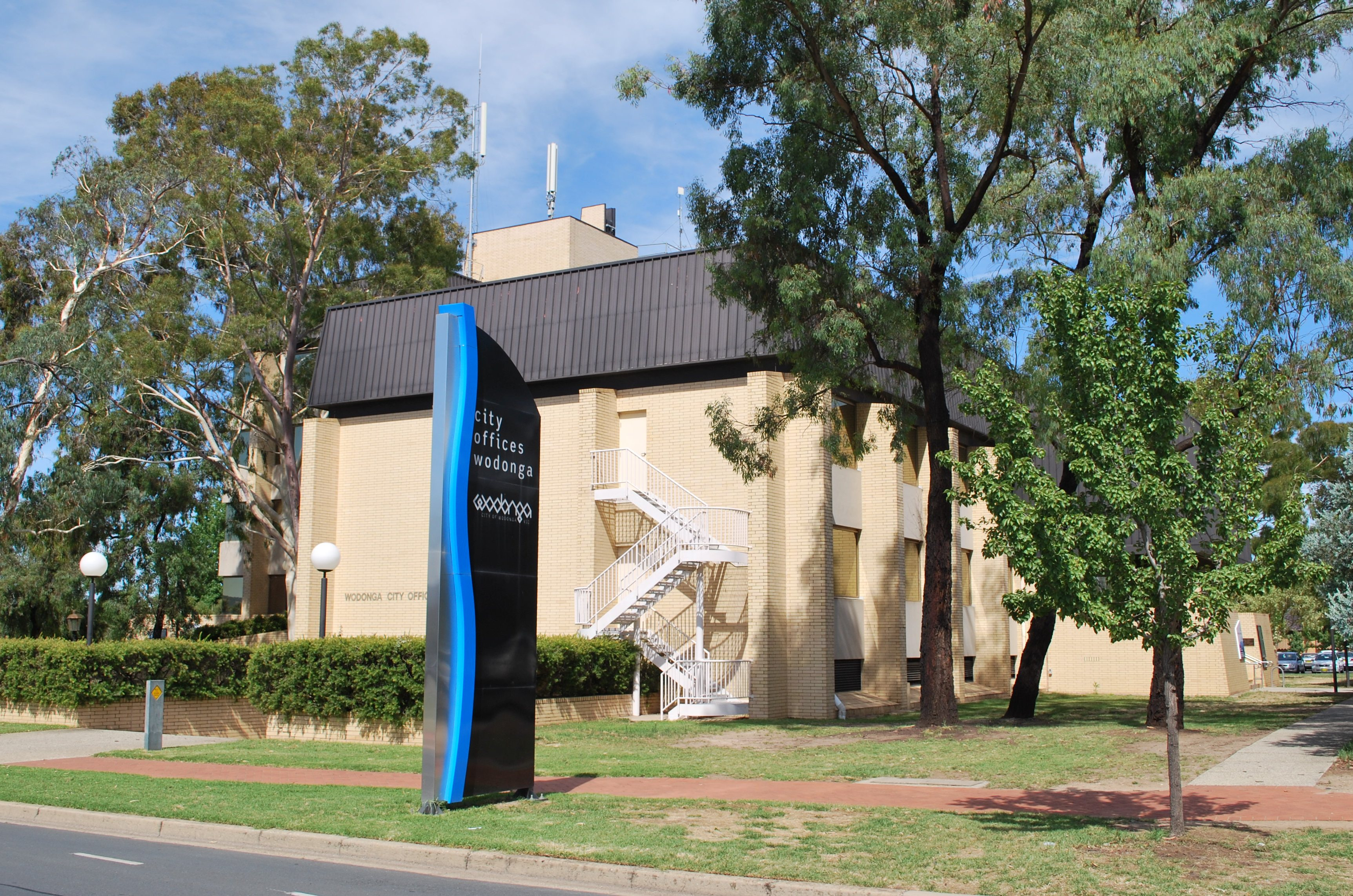
- Council offices in Wodonga

- Interactive map of City of Wodonga
- Coordinates: 36°07′00″S 146°53′00″E
- Country: Australia
- State: Victoria
- Region: Hume
- Established: 1876
- Council seat: Wodonga

Government
  - Mayor: Ron Mildren
  - State electorate: Benambra
  - Federal division: Indi

Area
  - Total: 433 km^{2} (167 sq mi)

Population
  - Total: 43,253 (2021 census)
  - Density: 99.89/km^{2} (258.72/sq mi)
- Gazetted: 18 November 1994
- Website: City of Wodonga
LGAs around City of Wodonga
Greater Hume (NSW)	Albury (NSW)	Greater Hume (NSW)
Indigo	City of Wodonga	Towong
Indigo	Indigo	Indigo

The City of Wodonga is a local government area in the Hume region of Victoria, Australia, located in the north-east part of the state. It covers an area of 433 square kilometres (167 mi^{2}) and in August 2021, had a population of 43,253.

It is primarily urban with the vast majority of its population living in the Greater Wodonga urban area, while other significant settlements within the LGA include Bandiana and Bonegilla. Its floral and fauna emblems are pink heath and the Leadbeater's possum respectively—the same as those of the state of Victoria. It is one of only a few regional councils in Victoria to remain serving just one urban district after the amalgamation process of 1994, although through that process it did gained some portions of the former shires of Chiltern and Yackandandah.

The city is governed and administered by the Wodonga City Council; its seat of local government and administrative centre is located at the council headquarters in Wodonga. The city is named after the main urban settlement located in the north-east of the LGA, that is Wodonga, which is also the LGA's most populous urban centre with a population of 37,839. It provides governance for the Victorian part of the Albury-Wodonga urban area.

== History ==
Wodonga was first surveyed in 1852 and proclaimed the town of Belvoir in the same year. In 1876 the Victorian colonial government granted a request from the people of the area for their district to be severed from the Shire of Yackandandah to form a new municipality, and on 10 March 1876, the Shire of Wodonga was incorporated. On 12 April 1911 it annexed a further part of Yackandandah, and on 30 March 1973, Wodonga was proclaimed a Rural City by the Governor of Victoria, Sir Rohan Delacombe.

The municipality survived widespread local government amalgamations in 1994, gaining the Baranduda and Barnawartha North districts from neighbouring shires. However, the councillors were dismissed on 18 November 1994, and replaced by commissioners Mel Read, a long-serving executive of the Albury-Wodonga Development Corporation, Des Kelly, a Shire of Tallangatta councillor from 1968 until 1994, and Mike Hansen, a retired army officer with management and logistics experience. The commissioners decided in 1995 that, to give the city a fresh image, the term "rural" be dropped from use except when legally required. It has since been officially renamed to the City of Wodonga after an application by the council in December 2003. The elected council was reinstituted in 1997.

The Rural City of Wodonga before the 1994 reforms (green) and the City of Wodonga's modern boundary (brown)

== Council ==
2024 ward boundaries. Expand the map and click on a ward to see the ward name.

=== Current composition ===
The current council is composed of seven councillors elected to represent an unsubdivided municipality. The current councillors were elected on 23 October 2020, and were announced 6 November 2020. On 23 November 2020, the councillors elected Kevin Poulton as Mayor for a one-year term, with a unanimous decision to have no Deputy Mayor. In March 2022, Kat Bennett announced that she would be resigning from council, the vacancy was filled by a countback from the 2020 election, and Danny Lowe was elected to fill the position. In October 2022, John Watson tendered his resignation after being diagnosed with pancreatic cancer. A countback from the 2020 election was once again conducted, and Danny Chamberlain was elected. In December 2022, mayoral elections took place and the council elected new mayor, Ron Mildren.

Ward	Party	Councillor	Notes
Unsubdivided	Independent	Kevin Poulton	
Unsubdivided	Independent	Danny Lowe	Elected in a 2022 countback
Unsubdivided	Independent	Graeme Simpfendorfer	
Unsubdivided	Independent	Libby Hall	Deputy Mayor
Unsubdivided	Independent	Ron Mildren	Mayor
Unsubdivided	Liberal Democrats	Olga Quilty	
Unsubdivided	Independent Liberal	Danny Chamberlain	Elected in a 2022 countback

==== Former Wards and Structure ====
Prior to 1994, Wodonga was composed of four wards and twelve councillors, with three councillors per ward elected to represent each of the following wards:

- Baranduda Ward
- Belvoir Ward
- Bonegilla Ward
- Greenhill Ward

The council was replaced with three commissioners on 18 November 1994, and at the 1997 inaugural elections of the new council, five councillors were elected to an unsubdivided municipality. Following the enactment of the Local Government (Democratic Reform) Act 2003 (Vic.), which amended the Local Government Act 1989, an independent review of Wodonga's internal structure was commissioned and advertised on 13 May 2004 by the Victorian Government. The final report by the Victorian Electoral Commission, issued on 27 September 2004, recommended that the council be increased in size to seven elected members, noting that at the time of the report, Wodonga was the only city council with fewer than seven, and that the task of representing the diversity and issues of a growing regional city was complex. It recommended leaving the City unsubdivided as it had a single, dominant centre and a small area.

The council was restructured accordingly and elections held on 26 November 2005 returned seven councillors with Rodney Wangman as mayor and Brian Wicks as deputy mayor. Elections in late November 2008 resulted in four of the sitting seven councillors losing their seats, and saw the City of Wodonga gain a new Mayor and Deputy-Mayor, Crs Mark Byatt and Angela Collins respectively.

=== Administration and governance ===
The council meets in the council chambers at the council headquarters in the Wodonga Municipal Offices, which is also the location of the council's administrative activities. It also provides customer services at its administrative centre in Wodonga.

== Election results ==
=== 2020 ===
2020 Victorian local elections: Wodonga
Party	Candidate	Votes	%	±%
Independent	Kat Bennett (elected 1)	3,209	14.12	
Independent	Kev Poulton (elected 2)	2,230	9.81	
Independent	Graeme Simpfendorfer (elected 3)	2,085	9.17	
Independent	Libby Hall (elected 4)	1,623	7.14	
Independent	John Watson (elected 6)	1,519	6.68	
Independent	Ron Mildren (elected 5)	1,367	6.01	
Liberal Democrats	Olga Quilty (elected 7)	1,326	5.83	
Independent Liberal	Danny Chamberlain	1,287	5.66	
Independent	Danny Lowe	1,239	5.45	
Independent	Rick Del Monte	1,123	4.94	
Greens	Rupinder Kaur	944	4.15	
Independent	Willem Manley	884	3.89	
Independent	Beth O'Shea	797	3.51	
Labor	Simon Welsh	688	3.03	
Independent	Bernard Squire	643	2.83	
Independent	Michael Fraser	496	2.18	
Independent	Joseph Thomsen	474	2.09	
Independent	Brian Mitchell	406	1.79	
Independent	Andrew Lees	389	1.71	
Total formal votes		22,729	91.52	
Informal votes		2106	8.48	
Turnout		24,835	76.58	

== Townships and localities ==
The 2021 census, the city had a population of 43,253 up from 39,351 in the 2016 census

Population
Locality	2016	2021
Bandiana	615	855
Baranduda	2,370	3,041
Barnawartha North	169	188
Bonegilla	693	610
Castle Creek	77	85
Ebden	136	110
Gateway Island	10	0
Huon Creek	135	320
Killara	8	9
Leneva	846	1,317
Staghorn Flat^	293	368
West Wodonga	14,576	14,794
Wodonga	18,948	20,259

^ – Territory divided with another LGA

== Population ==
Year	Population	Note(s)
1954	10,924	
1958	12,520	*
1961	12,968	
1966	11,867	
1971	13,074	
1976	15,733	
1981	19,208	
1986	22,693	
1991	26,389	
1996	29,158	
2001	30,921	
2006	33,010	
2011 census	35,519	
2012	36,947	
2013	37,804	
2014	38,759	
2015	39,599 (approx)	
2016	40,009 (approx)	
2017	40,567 (approx)	
2018	40,969 (approx)	

* Estimate in 1958 Victorian Year Book.

== See also ==
- List of localities in Victoria
- List of places on the Victorian Heritage Register in the City of Wodonga
