= Ebden, Victoria =

Ebden
- Town
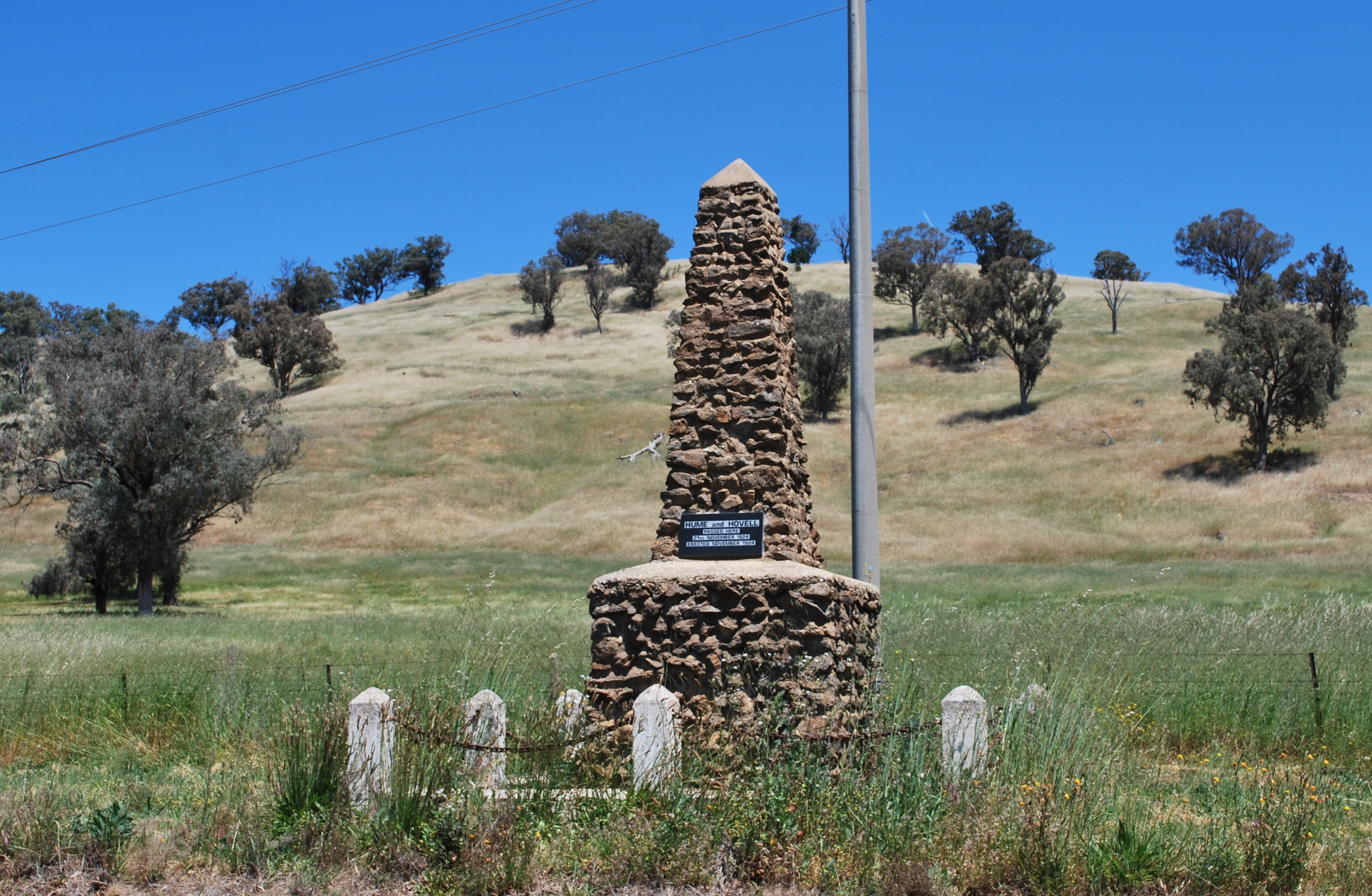
- Monument to the explorers, Hume and Hovell at Ebden, 2009

- Coordinates: 36°09′10″S 147°01′32″E
- Country: Australia
- State: Victoria
- Region: Hume
- LGA: City of Wodonga
- Location: 337 km (209 mi) NE of Melbourne; 15 km (9.3 mi) E of Wodonga

Government
  - State electorate: Benambra
  - Federal division: Indi

Population
  - Total: 110 (2021 census)
- Postcode: 3691

Ebden is a locality in north east Victoria, Australia. The locality is in the City of Wodonga local government area, 337 kilometres (209 mi) north east of the state capital, Melbourne.

At the 2021 census, Ebden had a population of 110.
