= Bandiana =

- Town
- Coordinates: 36°09′S 146°55′E
- Country: Australia
- State: Victoria
- Region: Hume
- LGA: City of Wodonga

Government
  - State electorate: Benambra
  - Federal division: Indi

Population
  - Total: 615 (2016 census)
- Postcode: 3694

Bandiana is a suburb of the City of Wodonga in the northeast of Victoria, Australia.

== History ==
Bandiana takes its name from the early name for the area, probably from a First Nations toponym.

The hill now known as Bears Hill appears as Bandiana Range in early maps and the Street family selected the property Bandiana Park in the late 1800s.

The Australian Defence Force has had a logistics and maintenance base in the area since 1942 and there was once a rail line and station servicing the area. Bandiana Military Post Office opened on 28 September 1942 and the region is still a major Australian Army logistics facility.

Plans were announced in June 2026 for the US government to store tens of millions of dollars of weapons, munitions, fuel and vehicles at Bandiana base. These will be available for rapid deployment in case of conflict in the Pacific area.

== Population ==
In the 2016 Census, there were 615 people in Bandiana. 86.4% of people were born in Australia and 89.6% of people only spoke English at home. The most common responses for religion were Catholic 22.5%. Of the employed people in Bandiana, 56.8% worked in Defence.

== Sport & Recreation ==
There was once an active 18 hole golf course at the Bandiana Army Golf Club on Donegan Road, but as of 2024, it is now closed.

Bandiana Football Association
1945 to

Bandiana Football Club

The Bandiana Football Club was established in 1940 and played in several different football leagues during it time between 1940 and 1973.

- Football Timeline
  - 1940
  - 1947–1951: Chiltern & District Football Association
  - 1952: Tallangatta & District Football League
  - 1953–1956: Chiltern & District Football Association
  - 1957–?
  - 1958–1963: Tallangatta & District Football League
  - 1964–?
  - 1965–1972: Tallangatta & District Football League
  - 1973: Club ceased playing official competition football.

Base Workshops Football Club (Bandiana Army)

Played in the Yackandandah & District Football League in 1951. They then joined the Tallangatta & District Football League in 1952.

Royal Australian Electrical & Mechanical Engineers FC

The RAEME FC were a football club solely made up of service men from the Military Area of Bandiana, that played in the Tallangatta & District Football League in 1953 and 1954. RAEME FC finished 10th (last) in 1953 and in 1954, the RAEME FC unfortunately did not finish off the season, after withdrawing from the competition after round nine, after losing all nine games.

RAEME FC player Percy Appleyard won the Tallangatta & District Football League best and fairest award, the J A Paton Trophy in 1953.

== See also ==
- Bandiana railway station, Victoria
- The Army Museum Bandiana

== Links ==
- 1943 - Bandiana SRD FC team photo
- 1943 - Bandiana BOD FC team photo
- 1944 - Bandiana Vehicle Park FC & Bandiana 1BOD FC team photos
- 1950 - Bandiana FC team photo
