= Cudgewa railway station =

Former railway station in Victoria, Australia

Coordinates: 36°11′35″S 147°46′15″E

Cudgewa

General information
- Location: Main Street, Cudgewa, Vic
- System: Cudgewa Line Station
- Line: Cudgewa
- Platforms: 1
- Tracks: Broad gauge

History
- Opened: 5 May 1921
- Closed: 1 March 1981

Services
Preceding station	Disused railways	Following station
Wabba	Cudgewa line	Terminus
	List of closed railway stations in Victoria	
Location

Cudgewa was the terminus railway station on the Cudgewa railway line in Cudgewa, Victoria, Australia. It was 410.249 km from Southern Cross station.

Cudgewa's station grounds were extensively upgraded in 1964 to allow for the railway to traffic goods such as cement, steel and electrical equipment for the Snowy Mountains Hydro-Electric Scheme.

The turntable and passenger platform were abolished in 1976. A disused paddock is all that is left where this station was once located.
