= Wodonga Rail Bypass =

Victorian state government project in regional Victoria, Australia

The Wodonga Rail Bypass, was a Victorian state government project in regional Victoria, Australia, to provide a new double-track railway bypass around the northern city of Wodonga. The 5.5-kilometre bypass eliminated 11 level crossings in Wodonga's central business district (CBD).

The project sought to address issues associated with increasing freight rail movements on the busy Sydney-Melbourne rail corridor and the frequent interruption of road traffic caused by train movements, while also allowing for urban renewal. In 2008, it was estimated that in 20 years, that freight rail traffic would increase by 70%. The bypass was slated to shave 10 minutes off a train trip between Sydney and Melbourne.

Since the opening of the new Wodonga railway station in 2011, passengers wishing to use the station need to complete their journey to and from the CBD by road transport.

== Funding ==
In December 2000, the federal government committed $20 million for the bypass project, In the 2006/07 budget, the Victorian government set aside $55 million to fund the bypass. In November 2006, the Government of Victoria came to an agreement with Pacific National to buy back the company's lease on the state's rail network, which enabled them to go ahead with the project.

== Cost ==
By January 2007, the estimated cost of the project had risen to $125 million, and the start of work on the bypass was delayed. The project was part of a $501 million upgrade of the North East line.

== Construction ==
Work finally began on the bypass in September 2008, with the Premier of Victoria John Brumby and Federal Infrastructure Minister Anthony Albanese turning the first sod. There were delays in October 2008, when the Dhudhuroa peoples told Federal Minister for Environment Peter Garrett that the works would be likely to desecrate and deface six culturally significant sites, areas and objects.

On 23 July 2010, the new rail bypass was opened, and the original line through Wodonga decommissioned. On 25 June 2011, the new Wodonga railway station opened.
