= High Country Rail Trail =

Rail trail in Australia

The High Country Rail Trail is an 80 kilometer, part-gravel part-sealed rail trail on the northern border of Victoria, Australia. It runs along the former Cudgewa railway line from Wodonga, along the edge of Lake Hume, to Shelley railway station in the former township of Shelley, Victoria. The eight kilometer section east from Tallangatta to Old Tallangatta is sealed; the remaining sections are not sealed but are accessible on hybrid, gravel, or mountain bikes.

The section from Bullioh to Shelley features a long but gradual climb, reaching 779 meters of altitude at Shelley. The climb features easy grades of 2-3%.

The rail trail features extensive views of Lake Hume from Wodonga to Tallangatta, and several historic trestle bridges on the climb to Shelley. However, there are no facilities available from Tallangatta to Koetong; riders will need to be prepared with sufficient food and water.

The trail will be extended from Shelley to Corryong going past the railways line original terminus of Cudgewa. The High Country Rail Trail will eventually be 112km long. Part of the future section to Cudgewa and Corryong is accessible, but it is only for keen walkers and mountain bike riders as the surface is rough and there are low-level crossings around the four bridges in this section.

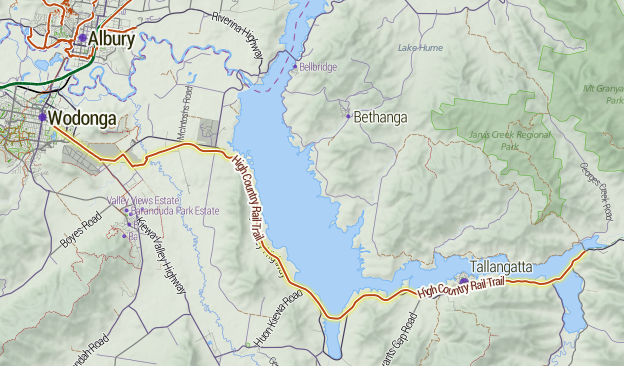
Map of the best developed section of the High Country Rail Trail.

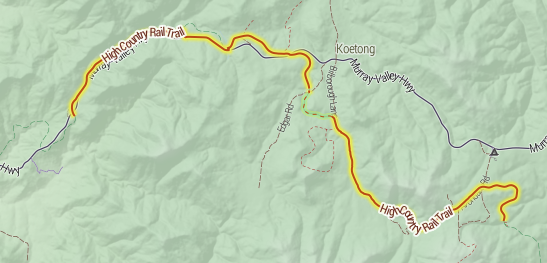
The eastern section, around Koetong.
