= Cudgewa railway line =

Former railway line in Victoria, Australia

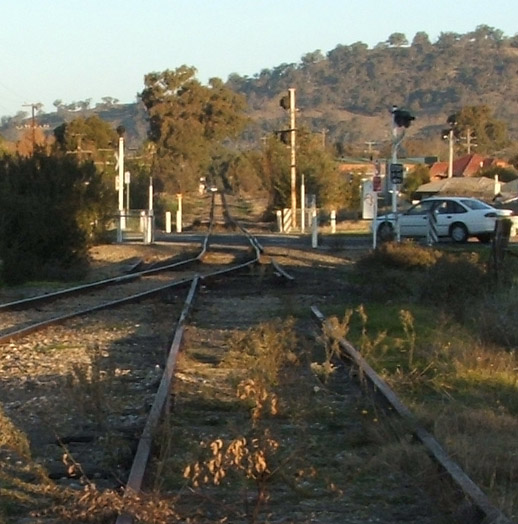
- Cudgewa line remnant to Bandiana, looking east from the former turning triangle at Wodonga

Overview
- Status: converted to High Country Rail Trail
- Owner: Victorian Railways
- Termini: Wodonga; Cudgewa
- Continues from: North East line
- Stations: 4

Service
- Operator: Victorian Railways

History
- Opened: Wodonga-Huon Lane: 10 September 1889; Huon Lane-Bolga: 18 July 1890; Bolga-Tallangatta: 24 July 1891; Tallangatta-Shelley: 13 June 1916; Shelley-Beetomba: 10 April 1919; Beetomba-Cudgewa: 5 May 1921
- Closed: 1 March 1981 (Bonegilla - Cudgewa) 22nd January 1995 (Broad gauge - Wodonga - Bandiana) 1 September 2009 (Standard gauge - Wodonga - Bandiana)

Technical
- Line length: 113.5 kilometres
- Track gauge: 1,600 mm (5 ft 3 in)

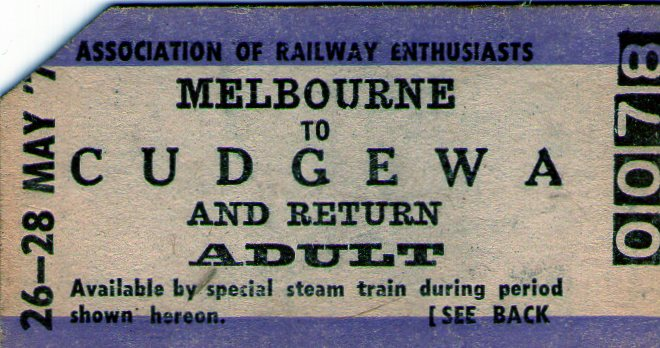
Melbourne-Cudgewa rail ticket 1978

The Cudgewa railway line is a closed railway line in the north-east of Victoria, Australia. Branching off the main North East line at Wodonga it ran east to a final terminus at Cudgewa. The High Country Rail Trail now uses most of the railway reserve.

== History ==
The Cudgewa line opened in stages between 1889 and 1921. The first section from Wodonga to Huon opened on 10 September 1889. It was extended to Bolga on 18 July 1890, Tallangatta on 24 July 1891, Shelley on 13 June 1916 (the highest station in Victoria), Beetoomba on 10 April 1919 and Cudgewa on 5 May 1921. The line would feature 1 in 30 grades and large trestle bridges to account for the mountainous terrains and flood plains which the line went through.

In 1919, the line was used to carry materials for the construction of Hume Weir, and three years later a spur line connecting Ebden to the weir was opened.

Part of the line was converted to dual gauge in 1944 to serve freight depots around Bandiana. In the early 1950s, the volume of Hume Reservoir was increased, with the railway around Tallangatta relocated to avoid the rising waters. In the 1960s, Cudgewa became the railhead of materials for the Snowy Mountains Scheme. During this period of time 2 trains would run away down the steep gradients eventually derailing. This would lead the VR to purchase T class T413 which became the regular diesel locomotive on the line after purchase in 1967. It was the only locomotive of the class with dynamic brakes.

The last passenger service from Wodonga to Tallangatta ran on 30 September 1961 with a 102hp Walker railmotor. On 21 April 1978, the last regular goods train ran, with closure of the line on 1 March 1981, except for the short section to Bandiana.

Part of the line was proposed to be converted to a heritage railway operation, with the Tallangatta Valley Steam Preservation Society incorporated in 1985. Some rolling stock was collected but the railway never opened to public use.

From 1995, it was a standard gauge track only. The Wodonga-Bandiana section closed on 1 September 2009 as part of the Wodonga Rail Bypass project. The section of the line between Wodonga and Tallangatta has now been converted into the High Country Rail Trail. On 20 October 2012, a new bridge opened over Lake Hume using the existing piers.
