= Albury War Cemetery =

War Cemetery in New South Wales, Australia

- Interactive map of Albury War Cemetery

Details
- Established: 1943
- Location: Albury, New South Wales
- Country: Australia
- Coordinates: 36°03′40″S 146°55′36″E
- Type: Public
- Owned by: Commonwealth War Graves Commission
- No. of graves: 96
- Find a Grave: Albury War Cemetery

Albury War Cemetery is a war cemetery that occupies a plot in the Albury General Cemetery (also called Waugh Road Cemetery) located in the Albury suburb of North Albury, New South Wales, Australia. It was begun by the Australian Army in 1943 and has been in the care of the Commonwealth War Graves Commission since 1949 and is maintained by the Office of Australian War Graves.

The cemetery contains 96 graves, 2 Royal Navy sailors, 5 Royal Australian Air Force airmen and 89 Australian Army soldiers. 24 of those buried died on 8 May 1943 in the Wodonga level crossing accident when a passenger steam train collided with a bus carrying 34 Australian Army personnel near Wodonga, Victoria, resulting in Australia's largest military funeral at the time.

A further 18 war graves are scattered throughout the Albury General Cemetery. They died as results of war-related injuries, accidents or illnesses. Also buried in Albury General Cemetery are 4 Australians of the First World War.
