= Wodonga level crossing accident =

Vehicle crash in Victoria, Australia

Details
- Date: 8 May 1943; 18:30 (AEDT UTC+11:00)
- Location: Tallangatta Road level crossing, Wodonga, Victoria
- Coordinates: 36°07′45.8″S 146°53′46.6″E
- Country: Australia
- Line: Cudgewa railway line
- Operator: Victorian Railways
- Service: Wodonga - Bandiana
- Incident type: Collision
- Cause: Misadventure

Statistics
- Bus: 1
- Trains: 1
- Deaths: 25
- Injured: 9

At 6:30 pm AEST, on 8 May 1943, a passenger steam train collided with a bus carrying thirty-four Australian Army personnel at the Tallangatta Road level crossing on the Cudgewa railway line near Wodonga, Victoria, Australia.

The collision resulted in the fatalities of the bus driver, twenty-three servicemen and a member of the Australian Army Medical Women's Service (AAMWS). Nine other servicemen and women were injured. This is Australia's worst level crossing accident.

== Collision ==
On May 8, 1943, at around 6:30 p.m., Victorian Railways A2 class steam locomotive A^{2}863 collided with a Symonds Bus Lines bus carrying thirty-four Australian Army soldiers who had been released on local leave from Bonegilla Army Camp in Bonegilla. The bus was heading to Albury. The collision occurred at a level crossing at the intersection of Tallangatta Road and the single-tracked Cudgewa railway line belonging to Victorian Railways. At the time of the accident the Victorian Railways train, according to eyewitnesses, was traveling at between approximately 15 miles per hour (24 km/h) to 18 miles per hour (29 km/h).

The bus driver, nineteen servicemen and a member of the AAMWS were killed during the collision and four later died from their injuries. Another nine servicemen were injured, some critically. The majority of victims sustained blunt force trauma and head injuries. The most seriously injured suffered skull fractures, lacerations and internal injuries. None of the train crew or train passengers were reported to have been injured. The impact tore open the front and right side of the bus, causing the bodies to be strewn over the road for 30 to 40 feet.

== Aftermath ==
A coroners inquest was held in June 1943 to uncover the cause of the tragedy. A finding of misadventure was recorded citing that the bus had no warning of the approaching train as the railway crossing was unattended.

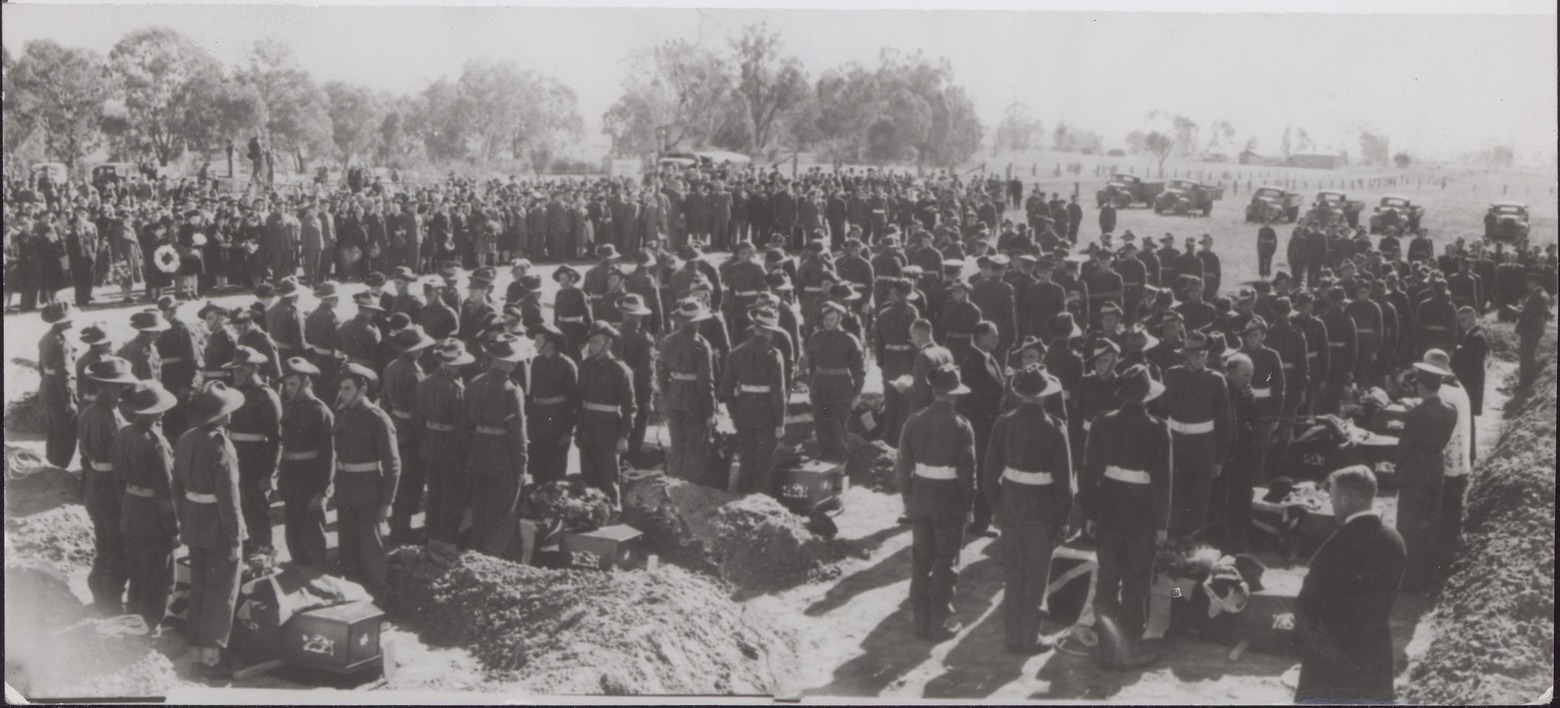
Elevated view of soldiers standing to attention beside coffins at the funeral of the military personnel killed, 11 May 1943.

=== Funerals ===
A large military funeral was held on 11 May 1943 at Albury War Cemetery where all who died in the accident were buried with full military honours. Four military trucks carried the 24 caskets from Bonegilla through Wodonga and Albury, proceeded by of a one-mile-long cortege of 130 vehicles More than 200 relatives attended the funeral.

Major General Eric Plant, General officer commanding and Victorian Lines of Communication, represented the government and military at the funeral and expressing his sympathy towards the families of the victims. He also conveyed the messages of condolence from the governor of Victoria Sir Winston Dugan, the Minister for the Army Frank Forde, and the Commander-in-Chief of Australian Forces General Sir Thomas Blamey. Major J. Wailes represented Signal Officer in Chief General Colin Hall Simpson at the funeral.

The civilian bus driver was buried at Williamstown, Victoria.

=== Memorials ===
A memorial cairn was erected at the site soon after to remember the fallen. In 1993 a new memorial cairn was erected at the site of the collision by the members of the units of Gaza Ridge Barracks, Wadsworth Barracks and Latchford Barracks collectively known as the Albury Wodonga Military Area, the Rural City of Wodonga and the Albury-Wodonga Development Corporation to commemorate the 50th anniversary of the accident. This memorial cairn was unveiled by the Chief of the General Staff Lieutenant General John C. Grey AC on the 8th May 1993.

== See also ==
- Railway accidents in Victoria
- List of disasters in Australia by death toll
- List of level crossing accidents
