= Victorian Railways A2 class =

Class of Australian 4-6-0 steam locomotives

Victorian Railways A^{2} class (Walschaerts)
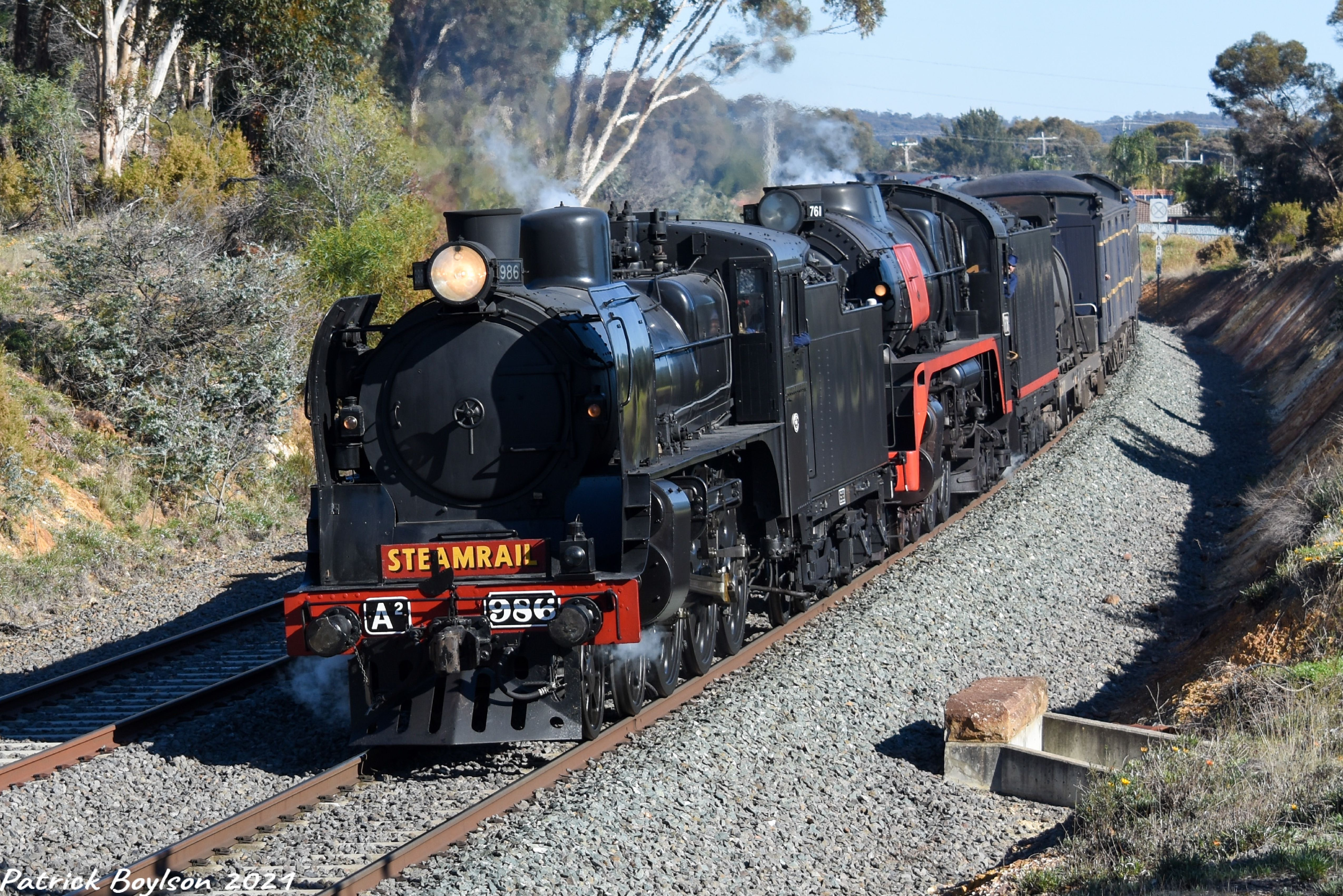
- A2 986 leading Cruise Express' 'Southern Steam Spectacular' rounding the curve in Golden Square
Type and origin
- Power type: steam
- Builder: Newport Workshops; Ballarat North Workshops; Bendigo Workshops
- Total produced: 185
Specifications
- Configuration
  - Whyte: 4-6-0
- Gauge: 5 ft 3 in (1,600 mm)
- Driver dia.: 73 in (1.854 m)
- Length: 63 ft 3 3/4 in (19.30 m)
- Axle load: 17 long tons 10 cwt (39,200 lb or 17.8 t)
- Adhesive weight: 52 long tons 2 cwt (116,700 lb or 52.9 t)
- Total weight: 121 long tons 7 cwt (271,800 lb or 123.3 t)
- Fuel type: Oil
- Fuel capacity: 1,500 imp gal (6,800 L; 1,800 US gal)
- Water cap.: 4,700 imp gal (21,000 L; 5,600 US gal)
- Firebox
  - Grate area: 29 sq ft (2.7 m^{2})
- Boiler pressure: 185 psi (1,276 kPa)
- Heating surface: 2,040 sq ft (190 m^{2})
- Cylinders: Two
- Cylinder size: 22 in × 26 in (559 mm × 660 mm)
- Valve gear: Stephenson (125); Walschaerts (60)
Performance figures
- Tractive effort: 27,480 lbf (122.24 kN) at 85% boiler pressure
Career
- First run: 1907
- Last run: 1963

The A^{2} class is an express passenger locomotive that ran on Victorian Railways from 1907 to 1963. A highly successful design entirely the work of Victorian Railways' own design office, its long service life was repeatedly extended as the Great Depression and later World War II delayed the introduction of more modern and powerful replacement locomotives.

== History ==
The introduction of the A^{2} class marked a turning point in Victorian Railways locomotive design, as it was entirely designed by VR engineers of the newly established Locomotive Design Section and the entire class built in-house at Victorian Railways workshops.

The design, which started as a stretched evolution of the 1903 AA class 4-4-0 with bogie tender, has been credited to Chief Draughtsman Ernest Victor Siepen, with overall supervision of Chief Mechanical Engineer T. H. Woodroffe. Previously this had been attributed to Alfred Ernest Smith, a later Chief Mechanical Engineer.

=== Production ===
At this time, the Sydney Express was regularly double-headed in both directions between Melbourne and Seymour, due primarily to the gradients either side of the Great Dividing Range. A^{2} 572 was trialled on this run and others for about a year, with minor improvements undertaken as they were found to be necessary. These included an altered design of forward frame stiffener (between the smokebox and leading bogie), additional bolts to hold the cylinders in place against the thrust of the pistons, and an additional cradle under the firebox backplate end of the boiler. However, the engine retained its distinctive flat-topped dome. Five more of the class, 574, 576, 578, 580 and 722, were ordered in 190, and production continued from them on.

Based on the success of the prototype A^{2}572, a total of 125 Stephenson valve gear A^{2} locomotives were built between 1907 and 1915. The design was then altered to incorporate larger diameter cylinders, a higher pressure boiler and Walschaerts valve gear, and a further 60 locomotives of that design were produced between 1915 and 1922.

=== Regular service ===
For over forty years, the A^{2}was the main express passenger locomotive on the VR, hauling intrastate and interstate services. With a maximum permitted speed of 70 miles per hour (115 km/h), the A^{2}was instrumental in the acceleration of timetables on many lines in the years following its introduction. A^{2} locomotives famously hauled the Geelong Flier, the first named train in Victoria, which ran express once a day in each direction between Melbourne and Geelong in 63 minutes, running from Flinders Street station, later cut to 55 minutes, running from Spencer Street station. However, other Geelong trains, stopping at wayside stations, still took about 90 minutes or more to make the journey.

Due to their comparatively heavy axle load, A^{2} locomotives were initially limited to the principal mainlines, but gradual upgrades to secondary lines saw the route-availability of the class expand, together with the range of services they hauled. Their size also meant that the outside cylinders of the new locomotives did not quite clear the stone or timber coping of some existing station platforms, requiring those platform edges to be cut back slightly to allow the locomotives to pass safely.

With their comparatively high tractive effort (the Walschaerts A^{2} had a higher nominal tractive effort than any other VR locomotive, regardless of type, until the introduction of the C class 2-8-0 of 1918), they also saw widespread use as a fast goods locomotive, particularly later in their life. As early as the 1920s, it was reported as normal practice that A^{2} class locomotives requiring adjustment to axle boxes and other moving parts be swapped from passenger to lower-speed freight service to extract more work from them between overhauls. Reportedly, engine crews preferred the Stephenson engines for fast running, but Walschearts locomotives for heavy haulage, based on the ride quality.

A^{2}s were also used to haul a number of special services, such as the Royal Trains for Australian tours of Prince of Wales and the Duke of York, in 1920 and 1927 respectively. Towards the end of their lives, A^{2}995 and 996 also had the distinction of hauling the last broad gauge Spirit of Progress service into Melbourne on 16 April 1962.

In 1928, the A^{2} was replaced on the principal North East line Sydney Limited and Albury Express services by the considerably more powerful three-cylinder S class Pacifics. However, new locomotive development ground to a halt during the 1930s, with the Great Depression severely affecting both VR traffic volumes and operating revenues, so the A^{2} continued to be the main express passenger power on all other VR mainlines.

In 1933, two A^{2} class locomotives set a haulage record for Victorian Railways when they headed a 75-truck 1,598-long-ton (1,624 t) wheat train from Benalla to Seymour.

Pairs of A^{2} class engines were regularly worked on the Melbourne-Ararat and Ararat-Serviceton portions of The Overland; common candidates included A^{2}940, A^{2}942, A^{2}947, A^{2}955, A^{2}966, A^{2}973, A^{2}976, A^{2}993 and A^{2}994.

=== Design improvements ===
Changes to the locomotive and tender designs slightly increased the roadworthy weight of engine and tender combined from 109 long tons 16 cwt (246,000 lb or 111.6 t) to 114 long tons 14 cwt (256,900 lb or 116.5 t), and the maximum axle load increased by about a quarter-ton. The Walschearts design was heavier again, with a roadworthy weight of 118 long tons 2 cwt (264,500 lb or 120 t), and maximum axle load of 17 long tons 10 cwt (39,200 lb or 17.8 t).

==== Superheaters ====
The majority of A^{2} locomotives were originally built with saturated steam boilers. The class were gradually fitted with superheaters (starting from A^{2}842, built 1913, fitted 1915), and to differentiate between the two variants the saturated steam locomotives were renumbered as A^{1} class, each being reclassified as A^{2} class again when fitted with a superheater. The order to reclassify saturated engines to A^{1} was issued on 16 March 1929 and applied to 70 engines, but some of these were still carrying A^{2} plates in 1932.

All Walschaerts locomotives were intended to enter service with superheated boilers, but wartime shortages meant that of the first fifteen (983 to 997), only 991 and 992 were issued to service with superheated boilers., the others running with saturated boilers for a few years. As these engines were refitted, the cylinders were replaced to achieve a 22 in (1 m) diameter, though thestroke length of 26 in (1 m) was retained. Other changes included reducing the boiler pressure from 200 psi (1,379 kPa) to 185 psi (1,276 kPa) at 80% of maximum safe rated pressure, offset by the fitting of superheaters. The first engine upgraded was A^{2} 820, and the work involved provision of new cylinder castings rather than reboring the prior set. Notably, around 1930, an Interstate Commissioners Conference agreed that superheated engines' tractive effort was to be calculated at 85% of maximum safe boiler pressure, against 80% for saturated engines.

The superheating equipment was of either the Robinson (369 sq ft (34 m^{2})) or Schmitt (499 sq ft (46 m^{2})) designs, either applied to the new-build Walschaerts locomotives. Engines upgraded were fitted with Robinson superheaters until 1929. From then, a new all-steel boiler and firebox was designed (in lieu of the prior copper inner firebox lining), and this style used ML5 equipment in lieu (331 sq ft (31 m^{2})); the steel boiler was interchangeable between the Stephenson and Walschaert locomotives, contingent on the safety valves being correctly set. Superheated engines were also fitted with mechanical lubricators.

Many engines were renumbered two or three times as the railways' management attempted to keep the two subclasses in different number blocks, and as the boundaries between the blocks shifted through the superheating program. The last of the A^{1} class, No. 808, was converted in October 1949.

==== Modified front end ====
In 1933, C class heavy goods locomotive C 5 was equipped with a new front end, based on the Association of American Railroads (AAR) design of self-cleaning smokebox, to improve steaming qualities. This was an evolution of design updates provided to the S and X class engines from 1928, including requiring only one spark-arresting grate through the year, rather than needing a second grate in summer. These changes netted a 23% increase in power output at 36 mph (58 km/h). Victorian Railways' Rolling Stock branch engineer Edgar Brownbill continued this work from May 1933, conducting tests with A^{2} 974 between Melbourne, Bendigo and Seymour with 1 1/2 in (38 mm) diameter superheater tubes, for a net improvement of 40% increased drawbar horsepower at 24 mph (39 km/h). These results were very promising, and in April 1934 A^{2}998 was selected for a series of additional tests aimed at further front end improvement. These tests involved various chimney-choke-point and blastpipe nozzle diameters, ranging from 30.25 in (768 mm) to 23 in (580 mm) and 7 in (180 mm) to 6 in (150 mm) respectively. In September 1934, A^{2}989 was the first to be fitted with the standard form of Modified Front End, and it completed a run from Bendigo to Spencer Street in 2 hours 10 minutes; A^{2} 993 was the next converted, and the first with smoke deflectors fitted in November 1934.

Diagram of A2 locomotive boiler, firebox and smokebox following Modified Front End improvements

Experiments were conducted, based on the work of Dr Wagner of the Deutsche Reichsbahn and E. C. Young of the University of Illinois, with final modifications to the A^{2} locomotive including:

- Revision of exhaust nozzle and chimney position and diameter, using Wagner's recommended ratios, with a larger 23 in (580 mm) diameter funnel, and a 6 in (150 mm) diameter low exhaust nozzle replacing the original 18 1/2 in (470 mm) diameter narrow-flanged chimney and 5 1/2 in (140 mm) diameter high exhaust nozzle
- Revision to the firebox grate, using a "rosebud" type grate with reduced air openings to improve fire stability under heavy load and give better firing qualities
- Replacement of full-length 1 3/8 in (35 mm) return bend superheater elements with 8 ft 6 in (2.59 m)-long 1 1/2 in (38 mm) elements

The sum result of the changes was a significant improvement in power and available tractive effort. Maximum drawbar horsepower increased about 40%, from 860 hp (640 kW) at 26 mph (42 km/h) to 1,230 hp (920 kW) at 32 mph (51 km/h). The improvement was such that the VR was able to further accelerate services hauled by the A^{2}, with the running time of the Melbourne to Bendigo express on the steeply graded 100 3/4 mi (162.1 km) line being cut from 162 to 145 minutes, and literally hours being cut from the schedule of the Melbourne to Adelaide Overland express.

However, a more recent review indicates that more appropriate exhaust values may have been 15.125 in (0 m) to 21 in (1 m) for the chimney choke point and 5.25 in (0 m) to 5.44 in (0 m) for the blastpipe nozzle diameter; and that suitable designs could have been adapted to the pre-existing chimney of the A^{2} class locomotive, without the later need to provide smoke deflectors.

The Modified Front End, which cost just £140 ($280) per locomotive at that time, was an extremely cost-effective improvement, and allowed the VR to defer new locomotive construction. The modification was so successful that not only was the entire A^{2} fleet converted during 1936–39, but also the C, K, N, S and X class locomotive fleets, and its principles were also incorporated into the design of all subsequent steam locomotives built or modified for the Victorian Railways.

==== Tenders ====
Then first forty engines built between 1907 and 1911 were fitted with Type AD tenders of capacity 5 long tons 0 cwt (11,200 lb or 5.1 t) coal and 4,460 imp gal (20,300 L; 5,360 US gal) water. These had tanks on a frame with 10.5 ft (3.2 m) bogie centres, distinct from the AA class locomotive tenders which had 11 ft (3.4 m) bogie centres but were 8 in (0.20 m) shorter behind the rear bogie than the Type AD. The bogies were identical to those used on the V and last of the A^{A} class engines, with split-spoke wheels of 3.125 ft (0.953 m) diameter. These tenders later had the sides extended to increase the coal capacity to 6 long tons 0 cwt (13,400 lb or 6.1 t) tons; some had their official water capacity listed as 4,500 imp gal (20,000 L; 5,400 US gal) gallons. The Type AD tenders were swapped between A^{2} and D^{D} series engines as required, with D^{2}766, A^{2}866, A^{2}893, A^{2}910 and A^{2}923 each being noted as having a short-frame tender with extended sides at some point before 1958. Similar short, self-trimming tenders were provided to the first ten K class locomotives when they entered service; from that point the short tenders were noted as Type DK. The last of the flat-top tenders were fitted to A2 913 and 939.

Engine A^{2}799 was the first fitted with a self-trimming tender in 1912, such that coal would naturally fall down the bunker towards the footplate as space was freed up; this avoided the fireman having to regularly climb up the top of the tender to push coal forward for later use. This design had capacity for 6.5 long tons 0 cwt (14,600 lb or 6.6 t) coal and 4,600 imp gal (21,000 L; 5,500 US gal) water, and was applied to all future A^{2} class locomotives as they were built. A similar, but shorter and reduced capacity, version of this design was provided for the D^{D} class locomotives delivered from Walkers, Queensland in 1913. All self-trimming tenders had solid-spoke wheels of 3.167 ft (0.965 m) diameter. Some of the A^{2}, C and N class self-trimming tenders had their coal capacity similarly increased around 1931; in this format they were registered as 6.5 long tons 0 cwt (14,600 lb or 6.6 t) coal and 4,660 imp gal (21,200 L; 5,600 US gal) water, though it is unlikely that any Type CN tenders were used on A^{2} locomotives or vice-versa. Generally speaking, ex-A^{2} tenders could be distinguished from ex-C and N class tenders by former having square-cut rear ends of the extended sides; the shorter length of the A^{2} tenders being less obvious.

A new standard self-trimming tender was introduced for the A^{2} fleet in 1933, mostly using Type AD frames from scrapped D^{D}-series locomotives; all such frames were 22 ft (6.7 m) long, and not altered. The new tank was straight-sided, with earlier instances being rivetted and later units welded. The capacity was for 6 long tons 0 cwt (13,400 lb or 6.1 t) coal and 4,500 imp gal (20,000 L; 5,400 US gal) water, and through the decade older tenders were replaced or modified with this design. These were the New Type AD tenders, and they were also given to D^{3} locomotives from 1935. To accommodate the increased axle load strengthened bogies were provided, fitted with solid-spoked wheels of an over-tyre diameter of 3.1875 ft (0.9716 m) diameter. Smaller versions of these tanks were built for the New Type DK tenders from 1940, provided to new build K class and refurbished D1, D2 and D3 locomotives; these had a capacity of 5 long tons 0 cwt (11,200 lb or 5.1 t) coal and 4,200 imp gal (19,000 L; 5,000 US gal) water, though later versions were shown as 6 long tons 0 cwt (13,400 lb or 6.1 t) coal and 4,000 imp gal (18,000 L; 4,800 US gal) water.

The final development was the creation of an all-welded tender tank, designed for tender frames of 23.5 ft (7.2 m) length with 12 ft (3.7 m) bogie centres. These were known as the Type ACN, were similar to the rivetted tenders provided to the Newport-built 1930/31 N class locomotives, and were used on the A2, C and N class engines interchangeably. They had capacity for 6 long tons 0 cwt (13,400 lb or 6.1 t) coal and 4,700 imp gal (21,000 L; 5,600 US gal) water.

==== Other changes ====
The original five locomotives had their Westinghouse air brake compressors mounted on the right-hand side of the firebox; all later engines had this changed to the smokebox, and within a few years the first five were amended to suit.

A^{2} 1072 was the last engine built at Newport to be painted Canadian Red; the next engine, C 2, was the first painted black. It is not known whether the ten subsequent A^{2} engines built at Ballarat and Bendigo were painted red or black on entry to service.

In 1922-1923 the Victorian Railways experimented with Precipitated Brown Coal, using locomotives A^{2}800, C16 and D^{D}1022. After completion of the trials, all three engines reverted to black coal firing. A photo of the engine with the modified tender appears in Newsrail, November 1983, p. 295. This followed experiments in 1913 with briquetted coal, which was tested on engines $\mathrm{D^D_E}$712 and A^{2}760.

May 1926 saw a Pyle National electric headlight, marker, cab and tender lights fitted to locomotive A^{2}978, and this was rolled out to all A2 and many other classes of engine in subsequent years, generally operated by a Pyle or Stone generator mounted ahead of the safety valves. Also around this time, Automatic Staff Exchange equipment was fitted to allow non-stop high-speed running through stations, where trains would otherwise have needed to slow down or stop for manual token exchanges.

In June 1933, A^{2}970 was fitted with an improved type of exhaust steam injector on the fireman's side; this was later compared to the 1935 fitting of an experimental A.C.F.I. (Accessoires pour les Chemins de Fer et l'Industrie) feedwater heater to A^{2}973. However, there was not sufficient improvement in efficiency for the equipment to be fitted to other locomotives and the latter was removed twelve years later, in 1947. The equipment was, however, retained for significantly longer than equivalent experiments by the New South Wales, Commonwealth and Western Australian Railways. While fitted with the A.C.F.I. equipment, A^{2}973 was generally allocated to the Bendigo line. After the equipment was removed, the engine was reallocated and often ran trips on The Overland.

With the reduced exhaust blast resulting from the revised smokebox, smoke deflectors were fitted to prevent drifting smoke from obscuring visibility.

By the 1930s the original plate frames of the A2 class had proven prone to cracking, particularly around the axle box cut-outs and the draw-gear (coupler) pockets. This resulted in at least five, possibly ten, engines being reframed with American-style bar frames in the period 1939–1945. (Australian Railway History 2019 lists five engines, Newsrail November 1983 says ten engines but does not specify which.)

In the years following World War II, problems with the quality and availability of coal supplies caused VR to order the conversion of all 60 Walschaerts A^{2}s to oil firing; in practice, only 56 were altered as four were scrapped before the conversion could be completed. A^{2} 942 was the first to be modified, being provided with a 1,400 imp gal (6,400 L; 1,700 US gal) gallon square oil tank fitted to the coal space of the tender. This style was selected to permit reconversion to coal burning if required. When it became apparent that oil burning was a permanent conversion, a new cylindrical tank design with 1,500 imp gal (6,800 L; 1,800 US gal) capacity was provided, that style also later rolled out to C and N class locomotives. Additional benefits included less time needed for enroute engine maintenance, e.g. breaking up clinker in the firebox and dumping of ash. These tanks later had steam heating coils fitted, to allow the use of cheaper Bunker C oil. Engines thought to have been fitted with the square-type oil tank included 940–941, 943–955, 957, 969, 971–974, 976-997 and 999.

Late in their life, five of the A^{2}s also received Boxpok driving wheels as their conventional spoked wheels began to suffer fatigue cracks with age and mileage. These wheels were reputed to give the engines a very rough ride, but apparently reduced the amount of maintenance required to the axle boxes. In July 1951, engine A^{2}888 was fitted with a different style of driving wheel, described as "fabricated welded", but restricted to freight work from that point on. A photo of these latter driving wheels appears in Newsrail, November 1983, p. 295, and a closeup of the fireman-side centre wheel in Newsrail, May 1979, p. 98.

Six Stephenson engines were fitted with shunters steps in the mid-1950s. This alteration may have been timed with the fitting of sand boxes for tender-first operation.

Other alterations not noted above included fitting of Flaman speed recorders, solid bush big ends and hard grease lubrication, exhaust steam injectors (for a while), flanged smokebox doors, automatic couplers, conversion to all-steel boilers (most locomotives), trick-ported valves on A^{2}963, Cardew track depression indicator gear on A^{2}980 and later A^{2}951, and tender scale buoy and continuous blowdown for A^{2}875. Some of the last changes involved fitting of integral water treatment units to the tenders, with a blow-down valve operated manually from the cab. This arrangement pulled sludge down to the boiler firebox water legs, allowing it to be discharged at regular intervals instead of needing to cool down and manually wash out the boiler.

=== Later years ===
In 1939, by which time most of the class was already over twenty-five years old, World War II broke out. The massive increase in traffic on the VR the war effort brought saw these ageing locomotives subjected to a punishing regime of heavy utilisation and minimal maintenance.

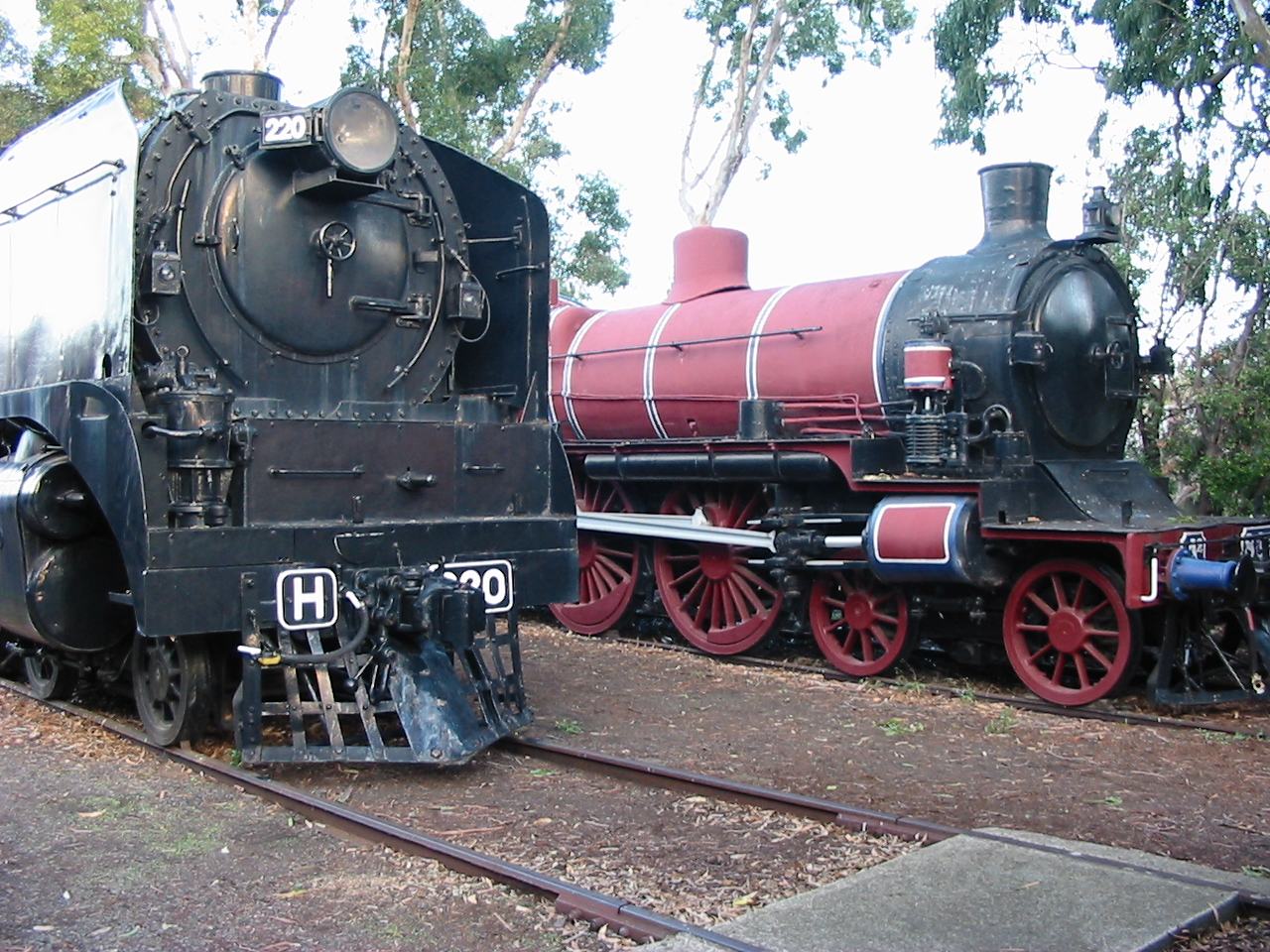
Stephenson A^{2}884 (right) dwarfed by H 220 (left), the locomotive intended to replace the A^{2} on Overland services

With VR's locomotive workshops switched to production of armaments and all available manpower given to the war effort, plans to eliminate the double-headed A^{2} operations on Melbourne–Adelaide passenger services with the introduction of more powerful H class 4-8-4 locomotives and additional S class locomotives did not come to fruition. The extra S class locomotives were never built and the line to Adelaide did not receive the necessary upgrades to take the weight of the H class.

The A^{2}'s principal express passenger role continued into the postwar years as the VR, struggling with a backlog of repairs and limited capital expenditure, deferred new passenger locomotive construction. It was not until March 1946 when the first of the class, A^{2}878, was withdrawn from service. In late 1948, the Victorian Railways ordered 20 replacement A^{2} boilers from Clyde Engineering in Granville, Sydney. These were delivered over the next year or so, and fitted to Stephensons engines 822, 823, 828, 851, 865, 886, 889, 903, 928 and Walschaerts engines 942, 943, 955, 962, 964, 973, 982, 986, 993, 994 and 997; the last of these was later removed and transplanted to Stephensons engine 932. These boilers were among the last steam era projects that manufacturer undertook.

In 1951, when the first of 70 new R class 4-6-4 express passenger locomotives were introduced, the A^{2} was finally superseded. In 1953, no fewer than 53 A^{2}s went to scrap, followed by 36 more in 1954. However, many of the class (particularly the later Walschaerts variants) continued on in secondary roles such as branch-line passenger and goods services and a number lasted into the 1960s. Their last regular mainline duty was hauling services between Flinders Street and Leongatha, on the South Gippsland line. The last in service, A^{2}986, was withdrawn on 2 December 1963, exactly 56 years after the original A^{2}572 entered service.

== Accidents ==
Some A^{2} locomotives were unfortunate enough to be involved in major accidents:

- At 2:58 am on 7 September 1951, the westbound and eastbound Overland expresses, both hauled by double-heading A^{2}s, collided head-on at Serviceton. All four locomotives were written off; three were so badly damaged they were scrapped on site.
- Wodonga level crossing accident: Australia's worst level crossing accident occurred on 8 May 1943, when A^{2}863 collided with a bus carrying troops at Wodonga. 25 people were killed.

== List of engines and renumberings ==
The A^{2} fleet was constructed in ten batches. All the Stephenson engines, batches 1 to 8, were constructed at the Victorian Railways' Newport Workshops. The same is true of Batch 9 and the first 20 engines of Batch 10. However, engines 1073–1077 (later 973–977) were built at Ballarat Workshops, and 1078–1082 (later 978–982) were built at Bendigo Workshops. There is no indication as to where engines 1083–1092 would have been constructed.

Except where otherwise marked, these tables are based on:

- Australian Railway History, August 2019
- Australian Railway History, August 2019 (Web extra)
- Medlin, P. N. (2004) Victorian Railways Locomotives by Number (self-published, based on Victorian Railways' locomotive repair cards)
- Victorian Railways locomotive record cards

=== Stephensons engines ===
Batch	Built		A^{2} (2nd)		A^{1} (1st)		A^{1} (2nd)		A^{1} or A^{2} (3rd)		Final ID		Front auto	Tender auto	Modified front end	Smoke deflectors	Electric lights	Staff exchanger	Off register	Reason	Age	Notes
1	1907-12-02	A^{2} 572	1925-08-05	A^{2} 805	19xx-xx-xx	A^{1} 805	-	-	-	-	1940-03-05	A^{2} 825	?	?	?	?	?	?	1954-09-17	Scrapped	46	Pattern engine. Different dome shape to rest of class, but not flat; swapped to normal by scrap date as A^{2} 825. Some unsubstantiated claims of dark blue being used in the original livery in lieu of chocolate brown, but no evidence. Was scrapped at Ballarat.
1	1908-10-28	A^{2} 574	1925-05-25	A^{2} 807	19xx-xx-xx	A^{1} 807	-	-	-	-	1946-12-24	A^{2} 878	?	?	?	?	?	?	1954-05-07	Scrapped	45	-
1	1908-10-30	A^{2} 576	1924-05-13	A^{2} 875	1930-09-xx	A^{1} 806	-	-	-	-	1944-03-16	A^{2} 837	?	?	?	?	?	?	1952-01-04	Scrapped	43	-
1	1908-11-27	A^{2} 578	1925-04-14	A^{2} 876	1929-10-xx	A^{1} 800	-	-	-	-	1932-06-xx	A^{2} 869	?	?	?	?	?	?	1952-11-13	Scrapped	43	-
1	1908-12-09	A^{2} 580	1923-10-25	A^{2} 877	1929-05-xx	A^{1} 877	1929-11-18	A^{1} 803	-	-	1941-02-22	A^{2} 845	?	?	?	?	?	?	1954-10-27	Scrapped	45	-
1	1908-12-21	A^{2} 722	1925-08-06	A^{2} 817	1930-04-xx	A^{1} 817	-	-	-	-	1944-12-21	A^{2} 827	?	?	?	?	?	?	1961-03-27	Scrapped	52	Fitted with shunters steps 14 September 1956.
1	1909-03-15	A^{2} 724	1924-12-16	A^{2} 819	1929-09-xx	A^{1} 819	-	-	-	-	1933-12-16	A^{2} 854	?	?	?	?	?	?	1951-04-20	Scrapped	42	-
1	1909-03-30	A^{2} 726	1925-11-11	A^{2} 820	-	-	-	-	-	-	1931-12-xx	A^{2} 870	?	?	?	?	?	?	1962-02-09	Scrapped	52	-
1	1909-04-08	A^{2} 728	1924-05-xx	A^{2} 881	1928-01-xx	A^{1} 804	-	-	-	-	1944-05-05	A^{2} 833	?	?	?	?	?	?	1954-12-09	Scrapped	45	-
1	1909-04-27	A^{2} 730	1925-11-25	A^{2} 822	1929-08-xx	A^{1} 822	-	-	-	-	1933-09-13	A^{2} 861	?	?	?	?	?	?	1953-04-13	Scrapped	43	-
2	1910-02-09	A^{2} 752	1926-01-29	A^{2} 823	-	-	-	-	-	-	1926-09-02	A^{2} 887	?	?	?	?	?	?	1954-02-10	Scrapped	44	-
2	1910-02-26	A^{2} 754	1925-10-12	A^{2} 825	-	-	-	-	-	-	1929-08-01	A^{2} 883	?	?	?	?	?	?	1962-06-27	Scrapped	52	Reframed 1945.
2	1910-03-04	A^{2} 756	1926-02-12	A^{2} 827	1929-11-xx	A^{1} 827	-	-	-	-	1933-2-xx	A^{2} 863	?	?	?	?	?	?	1953-12-18	Scrapped	43	Collided with bus at Wodonga 8 May 1943, killed 25 people.
2	1910-03-22	A^{2} 758	1925-08-26	A^{2} 829	1929-10-xx	A^{1} 829	-	-	-	-	1932-06-xx	A^{2} 867	?	?	?	?	?	?	1952-04-30	Scrapped	42	-
2	1910-04-18	A^{2} 760	1925-09-02	A^{2} 831	-	-	-	-	-	-	1929-10-xx	A^{2} 882	?	?	?	?	?	?	1952-11-13	Scrapped	42	-
2	1910-05-10	A^{2} 762	1925-12-08	A^{2} 833	19xx-xx-xx	A^{1} 833	-	-	-	-	1935-11-09	A^{2} 849	?	?	?	?	?	?	1953-03-13	Scrapped	42	-
2	1910-05-25	A^{2} 764	1925-04-18	A^{2} 835	19xx-xx-xx	A^{1} 835	-	-	-	-	1935-05-10	A^{2} 852	?	?	?	?	?	?	1954-08-06	Scrapped	44	-
2	1910-06-16	A^{2} 766	1925-12-07	A^{2} 837	19xx-xx-xx	A^{1} 837	-	-	-	-	1942-07-03	A^{2} 838	?	?	?	?	?	?	1951-03-03	Scrapped	40	-
2	1910-06-29	A^{2} 768	1925-09-04	A^{2} 840	-	-	-	-	-	-	1931-01-09	A^{2} 875	?	?	?	?	?	?	1954-09-30	Scrapped	44	-
2	1910-06-30	A^{2} 770	1925-11-30	A^{2} 841	19xx-xx-xx	A^{1} 841	1941-08-07	A^{1} 803	-	-	19xx-xx-xx	A^{2} 829	?	?	?	?	?	?	1952-05-14	Scrapped	41	-
3	1910-12-23	A^{2} 798	1925-10-08	A^{2} 842	1941-03-11	A^{1} 842	1949-10-07	A^{1} 808	-	-	1949-05-11	A^{2} 816	1934-06-29	1934-06-29	1938-09-22	1938-09-22	1942-06-10	?	1955-04-21	Scrapped	44	11/5/49 assumed to avoid conflict with A^{1} 816; index card is difficult to read.
3	1911-01-27	A^{2} 800	-	-	-	-	-	-	-	-	1929-12-16	A^{2} 876	1933-06-23	1933-06-23	1935-06-17	1935-06-17	1931-05-09	1935-06-17	1960-10-17	Scrapped	49	Precipitated Brown Coal experiments 1923–1924. Reframed 1942. Fitted with shunters steps 31 August 1956.
3	1911-02-11	A^{2} 802	-	-	19xx-xx-xx	A^{1} 802	-	-	-	-	1946-06-12	A^{2} 824	1933-02-25	1933-02-25	1935-10-12	1936-05-01	1941-01-28	Y	1950-12-08	Scrapped	39	Smoke deflectors were "new type"
3	1911-02-23	A^{2} 804	-	-	-	-	-	-	-	-	1926-08-07	A^{2} 885	?	?	?	?	?	?	1956-02-28	Scrapped	45	-
3	1911-03-08	A^{2} 806	-	-	-	-	-	-	-	-	1926-08-03	A^{2} 886	?	?	?	?	?	?	1954-02-10	Scrapped	42	Reboilered circa 1950.
3	1911-03-21	A^{2} 808	-	-	19xx-xx-xx	A^{1} 808	-	-	-	-	1933-12-21	A^{2} 855	?	?	?	?	?	?	1956-07-02	Scrapped	45	-
3	1911-03-31	A^{2} 810	-	-	9/1929	A^{1} 810	-	-	-	-	1935-09-07	A^{2} 851	?	?	?	?	?	?	1955-12-21	Scrapped	44	Reboilered circa 1950.
3	1911-04-11	A^{2} 812	-	-	19xx-xx-xx	A^{1} 812	-	-	-	-	1933-12-05	A^{2} 856	?	?	?	?	?	?	1951-08-30	Scrapped	40	-
3	1911-04-28	A^{2} 814	-	-	-	-	-	-	-	-	1929-09-xx	A^{2} 881	?	?	?	?	?	?	1959-10-09	Scrapped	48	-
3	1911-05-09	A^{2} 816	-	-	1929-09-12	A^{1} 816	-	-	-	-	1949-04-01	A^{2} 818	1933-06-30	1933-06-30	1937-10-15	1937-10-15	9/1927	1941-02-05	1953-02-13	Scrapped	41	-
4	1911-06-27	A^{2} 818	-	-	5/1931	A^{1} 818	-	-	-	-	1934-10-31	A^{2} 853	?	?	?	?	?	?	1953-04-13	Scrapped	41	-
4	1911-06-30	A^{2} 820	-	-	-	-	-	-	-	-	1925-10-24	A^{2} 898	?	?	?	?	?	?	1952-11-07	Scrapped	41	-
4	1911-07-20	A^{2} 822	-	-	-	-	-	-	-	-	1925-08-26	A^{2} 900	?	?	?	?	?	?	1951-09-03	Scrapped	40	-
4	1911-08-01	A^{2} 824	-	-	19xx-xx-xx	A^{1} 824	-	-	-	-	1946-01-24	A^{2} 826	?	?	?	?	?	?	1960-07-01	Scrapped	48	Confirm 1946 not 1926. Fitted with shunters steps 17 May 1954.
4	1911-08-16	A^{2} 826	-	-	-	-	-	-	-	-	1931-07-xx	A^{2} 871	?	?	?	?	?	?	1951-01-25	Scrapped	39	-
4	1911-08-26	A^{2} 828	-	-	7/1931	A^{1} 828	-	-	-	-	19xx-xx-xx	A^{2} 873	?	?	?	?	?	?	1955-07-28	Scrapped	43	-
4	1911-09-09	A^{2} 830	-	-	19xx-xx-xx	A^{1} 830	-	-	-	-	1933-02-13	A^{2} 864	?	?	?	?	?	?	1954-04-02	Scrapped	42	-
4	1911-09-19	A^{2} 832	-	-	-	-	-	-	-	-	1931-08-xx	A^{2} 872	?	?	?	?	?	?	1953-09-18	Scrapped	41	-
4	1911-09-27	A^{2} 834	-	-	19xx-xx-xx	A^{1} 858	-	-	-	-	1933-10-09	A^{2} 858	?	?	?	?	?	?	1953-07-30	Scrapped	41	-
6	1911-10-01	A^{2} 853	-	-	-	-	-	-	-	-	1925-08-03	A^{2} 918	?	?	?	?	?	?	1953-06-19	Scrapped	41	-
4	1911-10-04	A^{2} 836	-	-	19xx-xx-xx	A^{1} 836	-	-	-	-	1932-12-15	A^{2} 865	?	?	?	?	?	?	1956-09-29	Scrapped	44	Reboilered circa 1950.
5	1912-09-13	A^{2} 799	-	-	-	-	-	-	-	-	1924-10-29	A^{2} 890	?	?	?	?	?	?	1950-09-28	Scrapped	38	-
5	1912-09-20	A^{2} 801	-	-	19xx-xx-xx	A^{1} 801	-	-	-	-	1941-05-02	A^{2} 842	?	?	?	?	?	?	1953-08-26	Scrapped	40	-
5	1912-09-28	A^{2} 803	-	-	-	-	-	-	-	-	1930-02-xx	A^{2} 877	?	?	?	?	?	?	1954-01-18	Scrapped	41	-
5	1912-10-05	A^{2} 805	-	-	-	-	-	-	-	-	1925-06-29	A^{2} 891	?	?	?	?	?	?	1952-12-05	Scrapped	40	-
5	1912-10-12	A^{2} 807	-	-	-	-	-	-	-	-	1925-02-27	A^{2} 892	?	?	?	?	?	?	1952-10-13	Scrapped	40	-
5	1912-10-19	A^{2} 809	-	-	-	-	-	-	-	-	1925-05-06	A^{2} 893	?	?	?	?	?	?	1954-05-14	Scrapped	41	-
5	1912-10-29	A^{2} 811	-	-	1926-09-21	A^{1} 811	-	-	-	-	1948-07-23	A^{2} 820	1936-12-21	1936-12-21	1936-12-21	1936-12-21	1941-07-01	1948-07-23	1953-06-18	Scrapped	40	21 Sep 1926 is a guess based on ink shade.
5	1912-11-04	A^{2} 813	-	-	-	-	-	-	-	-	1925-05-13	A^{2} 894	?	?	?	?	?	?	1956-11-22	Scrapped	44	Fitted with shunters steps, date unknown.
5	1912-11-11	A^{2} 815	-	-	-	-	-	-	-	-	1925-02-11	A^{2} 895	?	?	?	?	?	?	1951-09-04	Scrapped	38	-
5	1912-11-18	A^{2} 817	-	-	-	-	-	-	-	-	1925-07-20	A^{2} 896	?	?	?	?	?	?	1953-03-20	Scrapped	40	-
5	1912-11-26	A^{2} 819	-	-	-	-	-	-	-	-	1924-12-09	A^{2} 897	?	?	?	?	?	?	1953-12-15	Scrapped	41	-
5	1912-12-03	A^{2} 821	-	-	-	-	-	-	-	-	1925-11-23	A^{2} 899	?	?	?	?	?	?	1951-09-26	Scrapped	38	-
5	1912-12-10	A^{2} 823	-	-	-	-	-	-	-	-	1926-01-19	A^{2} 901	?	?	?	?	?	?	1951-05-31	Scrapped	38	-
5	1912-12-16	A^{2} 825	-	-	-	-	-	-	-	-	1925-09-24	A^{2} 902	?	?	?	?	?	?	1954-04-22	Scrapped	41	Noted as a particularly poor engine, with high fuel consumption.
5	1912-12-20	A^{2} 827	-	-	-	-	-	-	-	-	1926-02-09	A^{2} 903	?	?	?	?	?	?	1956-01-27	Scrapped	43	Reboilered circa 1950.
5	1913-01-24	A^{2} 829	-	-	-	-	-	-	-	-	1925-06-14	A^{2} 904	?	?	?	?	?	?	1947-07-31	Scrapped	34	Scrapped following a collision with obstructing goods wagons at Riddells Creek on 1 July 1947
5	1913-02-03	A^{2} 831	-	-	-	-	-	-	-	-	1925-06-19	A^{2} 905	?	?	?	?	?	?	1953-12-09	Scrapped	40	-
5	1913-02-11	A^{2} 833	-	-	-	-	-	-	-	-	1925-08-25	A^{2} 906	?	?	?	?	?	?	1954-01-30	Scrapped	40	-
5	1913-02-21	A^{2} 835	-	-	-	-	-	-	-	-	1925-04-08	A^{2} 907	?	?	?	?	?	?	1953-06-05	Scrapped	40	-
5	1913-02-28	A^{2} 837	-	-	-	-	-	-	-	-	1925-08-25	A^{2} 908	?	?	?	?	?	?	1951-07-07	Scrapped	38	-
5	1913-03-11	A^{2} 839	-	-	1933-03-02	A^{2} 857	-	-	-	-	1933-03-02	A^{2} 857	?	?	?	?	?	?	1953-01-16	Scrapped	39	-
5	1913-03-19	A^{2} 841	-	-	-	-	-	-	-	-	1925-09-21	A^{2} 910	?	?	?	?	?	?	1957-02-08	Scrapped	43	-
5	1913-03-31	A^{2} 843	-	-	1933-12-05	A^{1} 843	1941-02-21	A^{1} 812	-	-	1949-04-01	A^{2} 817	1934-10-06	1934-10-06	10/1934	1936-02-05	1941-12-20	1949-04-01	1953-10-30	Scrapped	40	-
5	1913-04-14	A^{2} 845	-	-	-	-	-	-	-	-	1926-02-10	A^{2} 913	?	?	?	?	?	?	1953-02-06	Scrapped	39	-
5	1913-04-24	A^{2} 847	-	-	-	-	-	-	-	-	1925-08-07	A^{2} 914	?	?	?	?	?	?	1953-11-26	Scrapped	40	-
6	1913-07-26	A^{2} 838	-	-	1929-12-xx	A^{1} 838	-	-	-	-	1941-08-xx	A^{2} 841	?	?	?	?	?	?	1959-10-19	Scrapped	46	Noted as a poor steamer.
6	1913-08-02	A^{2} 840	-	-	-	-	-	-	-	-	1925-05-14	A^{2} 909	?	?	?	?	?	?	1955-01-12	Scrapped	41	-
6	1913-08-09	A^{2} 842	-	-	-	-	-	-	-	-	1925-04-04	A^{2} 911	?	?	?	?	?	?	1950-02-21	Scrapped	36	Noted as a poor steamer.
6	1913-08-16	A^{2} 844	-	-	-	-	-	-	-	-	1925-12-10	A^{2} 912	?	?	?	?	?	?	1953-09-18	Scrapped	40	-
6	1913-08-23	A^{2} 846	-	-	19xx-xx-xx	A^{1} 846	1933-12-29	A^{1} 827	-	-	1944-11-10	A^{2} 830	?	?	?	?	?	?	1953-07-01	Scrapped	39	-
6	1913-08-29	A^{2} 848	-	-	-	-	-	-	-	-	1929-07-xx	A^{2} 884	?	?	?	?	?	?	1954-07-30	Preserved	40	Noted as a poor steamer. Now at Newport Railway Museum.
6	1913-09-04	A^{2} 849	-	-	-	-	-	-	-	-	1925-02-03	A^{2} 916	?	?	?	?	?	?	1946-08-03	Scrapped	32	-
6	1913-09-10	A^{2} 850	-	-	-	-	-	-	-	-	1925-09-03	A^{2} 917	?	?	?	?	?	?	1952-11-07	Scrapped	39	-
6	1913-09-18	A^{2} 851	-	-	-	-	-	-	-	-	1929-10-xx	A^{2} 879	?	?	?	?	?	?	1954-03-26	Scrapped	40	-
6	1913-09-24	A^{2} 852	-	-	6/1931	A^{1} 852	1933-01-28	A^{1} 829	-	-	1940-07-12	A^{2} 846	?	?	?	?	?	?	1954-07-23	Scrapped	40	-
6	1913-10-08	A^{2} 854	-	-	1929-12-xx	A^{1} 854	1933-01-27	A^{1} 832	1944-01-xx	A^{1} 801	1946-11-xx	A^{2} 821	1939-02-17	1939-02-17	1939-02-17	1939-02-17	1941-04-05	1946-11-15	1953-10-09	Scrapped	40	Reportedly good for flat running, but not on steep lines to Bendigo or Seymour.
6	1913-10-15	A^{2} 855	-	-	19xx-xx-xx	A^{1} 855	1933-09-21	A^{1} 840	1941-06-26	A^{1} 810	1944-06-11	A^{2} 832	?	?	?	?	?	?	1953-09-14	Scrapped	39	-
6	1913-10-21	A^{2} 856	-	-	-	-	-	-	-	-	1926-06-12	A^{2} 919	?	?	?	?	?	?	1954-02-19	Scrapped	40	-
6	1913-10-30	A^{2} 857	-	-	-	-	-	-	-	-	1925-09-01	A^{2} 921	?	?	?	?	?	?	1953-03-24	Scrapped	39	-
7	1913-11-05	A^{2} 858	-	-	-	-	-	-	-	-	1925-07-03	A^{2} 925	?	?	?	?	?	?	1953-10-02	Scrapped	39	-
7	1913-11-12	A^{2} 859	-	-	1933-01-23	A^{1} 828	-	-	-	-	1944-09-22	A^{2} 831	?	?	?	?	?	?	1953-10-02	Scrapped	39	-
7	1913-11-19	A^{2} 860	-	-	1929-12-xx	A^{1} 860	-	-	-	-	19xx-xx-xx	A^{2} 860	?	?	?	?	?	?	1953-04-13	Scrapped	39	-
7	1913-11-26	A^{2} 861	-	-	-	-	-	-	-	-	1925-09-29	A^{2} 926	?	?	?	?	?	?	1951-02-19	Scrapped	37	-
7	1913-12-03	A^{2} 862	-	-	-	-	-	-	-	-	1925-06-23	A^{2} 927	?	?	?	?	?	?	1964-11-15	Scrapped	50	-
7	1913-12-11	A^{2} 863	-	-	-	-	-	-	-	-	1929-10-xx	A^{2} 878	?	?	?	?	?	?	1946-03-25	Wrecked	32	-
7	1913-12-16	A^{2} 864	-	-	-	-	-	-	-	-	1925-08-24	A^{2} 930	?	?	?	?	?	?	1953-12-04	Scrapped	39	-
7	1913-12-20	A^{2} 865	-	-	19xx-xx-xx	A^{1} 865	1932-01-xx	A^{1} 825	-	-	1944-10-xx	A^{2} 828	?	?	?	?	?	?	1960-10-22	Scrapped	46	Required a "light and often" firing technique. Reboilered circa 1950.
7	1913-12-22	A^{2} 866	-	-	-	-	-	-	-	-	1925-06-20	A^{2} 932	?	?	?	?	?	?	1962-03-27	Scrapped	48	Noted as a particularly good engine, with low fuel consumption. Reboilered circa 1954, using boiler recovered from scrapped A^{2} 997.
7	1914-01-22	A^{2} 867	-	-	19xx-xx-xx	A^{1} 867	1932-01-xx	A^{1} 823	-	-	1944-02-25	A^{2} 836	?	?	?	?	?	?	1956-03-21	Scrapped	42	-
7	1914-01-30	A^{2} 868	-	-	9/1929	A^{1} 868	-	-	-	-	1931-3-xx	A^{2} 868	?	?	?	?	?	?	1953-05-12	Scrapped	39	-
7	1914-02-07	A^{2} 869	-	-	4/1931	A^{1} 869	4/1931	A^{1} 821	1946-07-29	A^{1} 814	1948-11-05	A^{2} 819	1934-06-23	1934-06-23	1938-03-01	1938-03-01	1942-01-27	1948-11-05	1953-07-08	Scrapped	39	-
7	1914-02-14	A^{2} 870	-	-	4/1930	A^{1} 870	4/1931	A^{1} 815	-	-	1942-02-13	A^{2} 839	?	?	?	?	?	?	1954-02-12	Scrapped	39	-
7	1914-02-21	A^{2} 871	-	-	19xx-xx-xx	A^{1} 871	1931-04-xx	A^{1} 814	-	-	1948-11-05	A^{2} 834	?	?	?	?	?	?	1960-05-20	Scrapped	46	Fitted with shunters steps 17 May 1954.
7	1914-02-28	A^{2} 872	-	-	-	-	-	-	-	-	1926-10-16	A^{2} 933	?	?	?	?	?	?	1953-11-27	Scrapped	39	-
8	1914-07-29	A^{2} 913	1926-01-22	A^{2} 845	19xx-xx-xx	A^{1} 845	1933-12-29	A^{1} 809	-	-	1946-05-xx	A^{2} 823	1934-10-06	1930-12-25	1934-10-06	1936-04-30	1942-01-12	1946-05-24	1959-07-13	Scrapped	44	Smoke deflectors were "new type". Reboilered circa 1950.
8	1914-08-05	A^{2} 914	1925-08-07	A^{2} 847	-	-	-	-	-	-	1929-12-xx	A^{2} 874	?	?	?	?	?	?	1963-02-08	Scrapped	48	-
8	1914-08-12	A^{2} 915	-	-	-	-	-	-	-	-	No change	A^{2} 915	?	?	?	?	?	?	1955-01-20	Scrapped	40	-
8	1914-08-18	A^{2} 916	1925-09-03	A^{2} 849	19xx-xx-xx	A^{1} 849	1933-12-25	A^{1} 822	-	-	1936-05-16	A^{2} 848	?	?	?	?	?	?	1955-01-20	Scrapped	40	-
8	1914-08-28	A^{2} 917	1925-12-19	A^{2} 850	1929-11-xx	A^{1} 850	-	-	-	-	1933-03-18	A^{2} 850	?	?	?	?	?	?	1953-05-15	Scrapped	38	-
8	1914-09-24	A^{2} 918	1925-08-25	A^{2} 853	19xx-xx-xx	A^{1} 853	-	-	-	-	1933-05-27	A^{2} 862	?	?	?	?	?	?	1952-08-29	Scrapped	37	-
8	1914-10-09	A^{2} 919	1926-09-01	A^{2} 856	9/1926	A^{1} 856	7/1933	A^{1} 844	-	-	19xx-xx-xx	A^{2} 844	?	?	?	?	?	?	1956-06-05	Scrapped	41	-
8	1914-10-14	A^{2} 920	-	-	-	-	-	-	-	-	No change	A^{2} 920	?	?	?	?	?	?	1953-05-22	Scrapped	38	Reframed 1942.
8	1914-10-20	A^{2} 921	1925-11-27	A^{2} 888	-	-	-	-	-	-	1925-11-27	A^{2} 888	1934-06-09	1934-06-09	1936-11-12	1936-11-12	1938-05-21	1936-11-12	1955-11-21	Scrapped	41	Fitted with welded, fabricated wheel centres from 31 to 07–1951. Restricted to goods working only whilst fitted. Looked similar to Southern Rail's disc wheels, designed by the VR's Ted Wohlfahrt and bore no resemblance to BoxPok wheel centres.
8	1914-10-24	A^{2} 922	-	-	-	-	-	-	-	-	No change	A^{2} 922	?	?	?	?	?	?	1954-03-31	Scrapped	39	-
8	1914-10-31	A^{2} 923	-	-	-	-	-	-	-	-	No change	A^{2} 923	?	?	?	?	?	?	1960-10-05	Scrapped	45	Fitted with shunters steps 7 September 1956.
8	1914-11-07	A^{2} 924	-	-	-	-	-	-	-	-	No change	A^{2} 924	?	?	?	?	?	?	1953-04-10	Scrapped	38	-
8	1914-11-14	A^{2} 925	1926-08-xx	A^{2} 858	1925-08-13	A^{1} 826	-	-	-	-	1936-05-23	A^{2} 847	?	?	?	?	?	?	1953-01-23	Scrapped	38	-
8	1914-11-27	A^{2} 926	1925-09-02	A^{2} 861	19xx-xx-xx	A^{1} 861	1933-01-14	A^{1} 820	-	-	1933-01-14	A^{2} 843	?	?	?	?	?	?	1953-06-11	Scrapped	38	-
8	1914-11-28	A^{2} 927	1925-06-23	A^{2} 862	7/1929	A^{1} 862	-	-	1933-01-10	A^{2} 800	1944-03-18	A^{2} 835	?	?	?	?	?	?	1951-01-13	Scrapped	36	-
8	1914-12-08	A^{2} 928	-	-	-	-	-	-	-	-	No change	A^{2} 928	?	?	?	?	?	?	1956-06-01	Scrapped	41	Reboilered circa 1950.
8	1914-12-12	A^{2} 929	-	-	-	-	-	-	-	-	No change	A^{2} 929	?	?	?	?	?	?	1955-10-21	Scrapped	40	-
8	1914-12-17	A^{2} 930	1925-08-20	A^{2} 864	1932-01-xx	A^{1} 831	-	-	-	-	1941-06-25	A^{2} 840	?	?	?	?	?	?	1954-05-25	Scrapped	39	-
8	1914-12-22	A^{2} 931	-	-	-	-	-	-	-	-	No change	A^{2} 931	?	?	?	?	?	?	1953-10-12	Scrapped	38	-
8	1914-12-23	A^{2} 932	1925-07-07	A^{2} 866	-	-	-	-	-	-	1925-07-07	A^{2} 866	?	?	?	?	?	?	1963-05-12	Scrapped	48	-
8	1915-01-20	A^{2} 933	1926-08-25	A^{2} 872	4/1931	A^{1} 813	-	-	-	-	1946-07-25	A^{2} 822	1933-08-12	1933-08-12	1938-08-18	1938-08-18	1941-10-10	Y	1961-02-27	Scrapped	46	Reboilered circa 1950.
8	1915-01-29	A^{2} 934	-	-	-	-	-	-	-	-	No change	A^{2} 934	?	?	?	?	?	?	1961-02-27	Scrapped	46	-
8	1915-02-03	A^{2} 935	-	-	-	-	-	-	-	-	No change	A^{2} 935	?	?	?	?	?	?	1954-10-08	Scrapped	39	-
8	1915-02-11	A^{2} 936	-	-	-	-	-	-	-	-	No change	A^{2} 936	?	?	?	?	?	?	1954-05-03	Scrapped	39	-
8	1915-02-16	A^{2} 937	-	-	-	-	-	-	-	-	No change	A^{2} 937	?	?	?	?	?	?	1955-01-19	Scrapped	39	-
8	1915-02-27	A^{2} 938	1924-11-27	A^{2} 873	1931-03-12	A^{1} 809	-	-	-	-	1933-09-19	A^{2} 859	?	?	?	?	?	?	1951-04-09	Scrapped	36	19/9/33 or 29/9/33
8	1915-03-03	A^{2} 939	1925-06-03	A^{2} 874	-	-	-	-	-	-	1929-07-xx	A^{2} 880	?	?	?	?	?	?	1953-01-19	Scrapped	37	-
8	1915-03-10	A^{2} 940	1925-09-16	A^{2} 938	-	-	-	-	-	-	1925-09-16	A^{2} 938	?	?	?	?	?	?	1961-01-27	Scrapped	45	-
8	1915-03-17	A^{2} 941	1925-08-07	A^{2} 939	-	-	-	-	-	-	1925-08-07	A^{2} 939	?	?	?	?	?	?	1959-06-16	Scrapped	44	-
8	1915-03-24	A^{2} 942	1924-07-30	A^{2} 902	-	-	-	-	-	-	1925-11-24	A^{2} 889	?	?	?	?	?	?	1956-06-12	Scrapped	41	Reboilered circa 1950.

=== Walschaerts engines ===
Batch	Built		Final ID		Front auto	Tender auto	Modified front end	Smoke deflectors	Electric lights	Staff exchanger	Conversion to oil	Tank type (may not be accurate)	Off register	Reason	Age	Notes
9	1915-10-23	A^{2} 983	No change	A^{2} 983	?	?	?	?	?	?	Y	Square	1955-06-14	Scrapped	39	-
9	1915-11-01	A^{2} 984	No change	A^{2} 984	?	?	?	?	?	?	Y	Cylindrical	1954-05-12	Scrapped	38	Noted as a poor steamer.
9	1915-11-09	A^{2} 985	No change	A^{2} 985	?	?	?	?	?	?	Y	Square	1953-05-29	Scrapped	37	-
9	1915-11-18	A^{2} 986	No change	A^{2} 986	?	?	?	?	?	?	Y	Cylindrical	1964-01-15	Preserved	48	Boxpok wheels from May 1948. Reboilered circa 1950. Preserved Warragul, then to Steamrail Victoria (swapped for J550). Restored to working order as coal-burner.
9	1915-11-30	A^{2} 987	No change	A^{2} 987	?	?	?	?	?	?	Y	Square	1954-11-26	Scrapped	38	-
9	1915-12-11	A^{2} 988	No change	A^{2} 988	?	?	?	?	?	?	Y	Square	1957-03-01	Scrapped	41	-
9	1915-12-23	A^{2} 989	No change	A^{2} 989	?	?	?	?	?	?	Y	Cylindrical	1954-11-25	Scrapped	38	Noted as a poor steamer.
9	1916-01-11	A^{2} 990	No change	A^{2} 990	?	?	?	?	?	?	Y	Cylindrical	1962-03-21	Scrapped	46	-
9	1916-03-31	A^{2} 991	No change	A^{2} 991	?	?	?	?	?	?	Y	Cylindrical	1953-06-15	Scrapped	37	-
9	1916-08-23	A^{2} 992	No change	A^{2} 992	?	?	?	?	?	?	Y	Square	1953-08-07	Scrapped	36	Boxpok wheels from Aug 1948.
9	1916-04-15	A^{2} 993	No change	A^{2} 993	?	?	?	?	?	?	Y	Cylindrical	1959-06-12	Scrapped	43	Used for the Duke of Gloucester's train in 1934. Reboilered circa 1950.
9	1916-05-10	A^{2} 994	No change	A^{2} 994	?	?	?	?	?	?	Y	Cylindrical	1962-02-09	Scrapped	45	Reboilered circa 1950.
9	1916-06-29	A^{2} 995	No change	A^{2} 995	?	?	?	?	?	?	Y	Cylindrical	1963-09-13	Preserved	47	Newport Railway Museum. Ran the last broad gauge Spirit of Progress to Seymour.
9	1916-06-09	A^{2} 996	No change	A^{2} 996	?	?	?	?	?	?	Y	Square	1963-11-22	Preserved	47	Reframed 1939. Static at Echuca wharf. Ran the last broad gauge Spirit of Progress to Seymour.
9	1917-06-30	A^{2} 997	No change	A^{2} 997	?	?	?	?	?	?	Y	Square	1953-01-12	Scrapped	35	Reboilered circa 1950; after the engine was scrapped, the boiler was transplanted into A^{2} 932.
9	1918-05-10	A^{2} 998	No change	A^{2} 998	?	?	?	?	?	?	n/a	n/a	1947-08-04	Scrapped	29	-
9	1918-06-25	A^{2} 999	No change	A^{2} 999	?	?	?	?	?	?	Y	Square	1954-04-15	Scrapped	35	Supposedly the "Pride of Bendigo".
9	1918-07-24	A^{2} 1000	1925-08-27	A^{2} 940	?	?	?	?	?	?	Y	Square	1954-09-23	Scrapped	36	-
9	1918-08-17	A^{2} 1001	1925-11-05	A^{2} 941	?	?	?	?	?	?	Y	Cylindrical	1959-11-01	Scrapped	41	Fitted with Nathan mechanical lubricator circa mid 1940s.
9	1918-08-25	A^{2} 1002	1924-09-27	A^{2} 942	?	?	?	?	?	?	Y	Square	1957-01-24	Scrapped	38	Reframed 1939. Fitted with Nathan mechanical lubricator circa mid 1940s. First conversion to oil burning.
9	1918-10-29	A^{2} 1003	1924-05-06	A^{2} 943	?	?	?	?	?	?	Y	Square	1956-08-27	Scrapped	37	Reboilered circa 1950.
9	1918-11-27	A^{2} 1004	1925-02-27	A^{2} 944	1935-05-25	1935-05-25	1935-05-25	1935-12-17	1930-09-10	1935-05-25	1946-07-11	Cylindrical	1954-11-12	Scrapped	35	Boxpok wheels from Dec 1948
9	1918-12-20	A^{2} 1005	1925-06-30	A^{2} 945	?	?	?	?	?	?	Y	Square	1958-10-31	Scrapped	39	-
9	1919-02-07	A^{2} 1006	1924-04-30	A^{2} 946	?	?	?	?	?	?	Y	Square	1953-10-09	Scrapped	34	Involved in Serviceton disaster, 1951. Only engine repaired.
9	1919-03-13	A^{2} 1007	1925-08-26	A^{2} 947	?	?	?	?	?	?	Y	Square	1962-04-09	Scrapped	43	-
9	1919-04-15	A^{2} 1008	1925-12-16	A^{2} 948	?	?	?	?	?	?	Y	Square	1952-09-18	Scrapped	33	Boxpok wheels from Nov 1947
9	1919-05-27	A^{2} 1009	1925-08-11	A^{2} 949	?	?	?	?	?	?	Y	Square	1954-10-15	Scrapped	35	-
9	1919-06-12	A^{2} 1010	1925-07-23	A^{2} 950	?	?	?	?	?	?	Y	Square	1955-02-17	Scrapped	35	-
9	1919-06-28	A^{2} 1011	1924-05-31	A^{2} 951	?	?	?	?	?	?	Y	Square	1954-05-05	Scrapped	34	-
9	1919-08-09	A^{2} 1012	1925-02-10	A^{2} 952	?	?	?	?	?	?	Y	Square	1956-04-30	Scrapped	36	-
10	1920-05-12	A^{2} 1053	1925-08-11	A^{2} 953	?	?	?	?	?	?	Y	Cylindrical	1952-01-04	Wrecked	31	Involved in Serviceton disaster, 1951. Scrapped on site.
10	1920-07-05	A^{2} 1054	1926-01-11	A^{2} 954	?	?	?	?	?	?	Y	Square	1955-04-06	Scrapped	34	-
10	1920-08-03	A^{2} 1055	1925-09-04	A^{2} 955	?	?	?	?	?	?	Y	Square	1961-03-09	Scrapped	40	Reboilered circa 1950.
10	1920-08-24	A^{2} 1056	1925-12-18	A^{2} 956	?	?	?	?	?	?	n/a	n/a	1946-08-03	Scrapped	25	-
10	1920-09-16	A^{2} 1057	1925-05-29	A^{2} 957	?	?	?	?	?	?	Y	Cylindrical	1953-07-10	Scrapped	32	-
10	1920-10-09	A^{2} 1058	1925-06-12	A^{2} 958	?	?	?	?	?	?	Y	Cylindrical	1952-01-04	Wrecked	31	Involved in Serviceton disaster, 1951. Scrapped on site.
10	1920-10-28	A^{2} 1059	1925-05-23	A^{2} 959	?	?	?	?	?	?	Y	Square	1954-10-22	Scrapped	33	-
10	1920-11-20	A^{2} 1060	1925-06-23	A^{2} 960	?	?	?	?	?	?	Y	Square	1954-06-24	Scrapped	33	-
10	1920-12-11	A^{2} 1061	1925-06-02	A^{2} 961	?	?	?	?	?	?	Y	Square	1953-02-27	Scrapped	32	-
10	1920-12-22	A^{2} 1062	1925-06-29	A^{2} 962	?	?	?	?	?	?	Y	Square	1956-02-03	Scrapped	35	Reboilered circa 1950.
10	1921-03-24	A^{2} 1063	1923-10-26	A^{2} 963	?	?	?	?	?	?	Y	Square	1956-03-22	Scrapped	34	-
10	1921-04-15	A^{2} 1064	1924-10-29	A^{2} 964	?	?	?	?	?	?	Y	Cylindrical	1964-01-15	Preserved	42	Boxpok wheels from Sep 1947. Preserved Reservoir. Reboilered circa 1950.
10	1921-05-05	A^{2} 1065	1926-01-07	A^{2} 965	?	?	?	?	?	?	Y	Square	1954-03-26	Scrapped	32	-
10	1921-05-27	A^{2} 1066	1925-09-23	A^{2} 966	?	?	?	?	?	?	Y	Cylindrical	1954-03-19	Scrapped	32	-
10	1921-06-17	A^{2} 1067	1926-11-23	A^{2} 967	?	?	?	?	?	?	Y	Cylindrical	1955-07-18	Scrapped	34	Noted as a poor steamer.
10	1921-07-06	A^{2} 1068	1926-02-11	A^{2} 968	?	?	?	?	?	?	Y	Square	1955-10-07	Scrapped	34	-
10	1921-07-26	A^{2} 1069	1926-08-04	A^{2} 969	?	?	?	?	?	?	Y	Square	1953-01-06	Scrapped	31	-
10	1921-08-13	A^{2} 1070	1925-05-04	A^{2} 970	?	?	?	?	?	?	n/a	n/a	1946-08-03	Scrapped	24	-
10	1921-09-02	A^{2} 1071	1923-11-30	A^{2} 971	?	?	?	?	?	?	Y	Cylindrical	1960-09-14	Scrapped	39	-
10	1921-09-21	A^{2} 1072	1923-10-27	A^{2} 972	?	?	?	?	?	?	Y	Square	1954-03-05	Scrapped	32	-
10	1921-09-30	A^{2} 1073	1925-10-16	A^{2} 973	?	?	?	?	?	?	Y	Cylindrical	1957-02-22	Scrapped	35	ACFI Feedwater heater 1936–1944. Reboilered circa 1950.
10	1921-11-16	A^{2} 1078	1925-05-18	A^{2} 978	?	?	?	?	?	?	Y	Square	1958-09-19	Scrapped	36	-
10	1921-11-21	A^{2} 1079	1923-12-11	A^{2} 979	?	?	?	?	?	?	Y	Cylindrical	1953-11-20	Scrapped	31	-
10	1921-11-28	A^{2} 1074	1923-11-29	A^{2} 974	?	?	?	?	?	?	Y	Square	1958-09-25	Scrapped	36	-
10	1922-02-09	A^{2} 1075	1924-01-12	A^{2} 975	?	?	?	?	?	?	n/a	n/a	1950-01-24	Scrapped	27	-
10	1922-03-13	A^{2} 1080	1924-04-07	A^{2} 980	?	?	?	?	?	?	Y	Cylindrical	1954-11-05	Scrapped	32	Noted as an unpredictable engine, alternately easy or difficult to work.
10	1922-04-21	A^{2} 1076	1924-08-21	A^{2} 976	?	?	?	?	?	?	Y	Square	1957-02-19	Scrapped	34	-
10	1922-06-08	A^{2} 1081	1926-01-26	A^{2} 981	?	?	?	?	?	?	Y	Square	1954-09-10	Scrapped	32	-
10	1922-06-26	A^{2} 1077	1924-03-29	A^{2} 977	?	?	?	?	?	?	Y	Square	1952-01-04	Wrecked	29	Involved in Serviceton disaster, 1951. Scrapped on site.
10	1922-06-29	A^{2} 1082	1926-01-15	A^{2} 982	?	?	?	?	?	?	Y	Cylindrical	1957-05-17	Scrapped	34	Reboilered circa 1950.
10	Not built	A^{2} 1083	-	-	-	-	-	-	-	-	-	-	-	-	-	10th order was for 40 engines but only 30 built.
10	Not built	A^{2} 1084	-	-	-	-	-	-	-	-	-	-	-	-	-	10th order was for 40 engines but only 30 built.
10	Not built	A^{2} 1085	-	-	-	-	-	-	-	-	-	-	-	-	-	10th order was for 40 engines but only 30 built.
10	Not built	A^{2} 1086	-	-	-	-	-	-	-	-	-	-	-	-	-	10th order was for 40 engines but only 30 built.
10	Not built	A^{2} 1087	-	-	-	-	-	-	-	-	-	-	-	-	-	10th order was for 40 engines but only 30 built.
10	Not built	A^{2} 1088	-	-	-	-	-	-	-	-	-	-	-	-	-	10th order was for 40 engines but only 30 built.
10	Not built	A^{2} 1089	-	-	-	-	-	-	-	-	-	-	-	-	-	10th order was for 40 engines but only 30 built.
10	Not built	A^{2} 1090	-	-	-	-	-	-	-	-	-	-	-	-	-	10th order was for 40 engines but only 30 built.
10	Not built	A^{2} 1091	-	-	-	-	-	-	-	-	-	-	-	-	-	10th order was for 40 engines but only 30 built.
10	Not built	A^{2} 1092	-	-	-	-	-	-	-	-	-	-	-	-	-	10th order was for 40 engines but only 30 built.

=== A Class renumbering proposal ===
In or around 1918 there was a proposal seriously considered to renumber all locomotives with single-letter codes and numbers of each class starting from one. A photo had been taken, or perhaps mocked up, showing an A^{2} with cabside number plates reading A126, or perhaps A127 or A128.

Backing this up was an article in "The Locomotive", an English railway journal, dated 15 July 1916. The article included a photo captioned "Victorian Railways 4-6-0 A class No. 134"; the engine number is also used in the text. However, there is no cabside number and the builders plate in the photo is not clear enough to read, so there is no way to confirm which specific member of the Walschearts A2 class the photo shows. If it were A^{2}991, that would make it the 134th engine of the A^{2} class. However, the article text refers to it as "The first of these engines", so it may actually be a photo of A^{2}983, the first Walschearts-fitted locomotive which was the 126th A^{2} class. It can't be the 134th engine built at Newport Workshops in total given the sheer quantity of A^{2} and D^{D} engines that had been built by that point, not could it be the 134th engine that year when the workshop production probably peaked at around 20 or maybe 30 engines per year, on top of other equipment.

In any case, the renumbering proposal was not proceeded with; the Victorian Railways' official historian Mr L. J. Harrigan hypothesised that the idea was dropped due to the cost of providing new number plates for the entire fleet, but that at least one number plate had been cast.

== Preservation ==
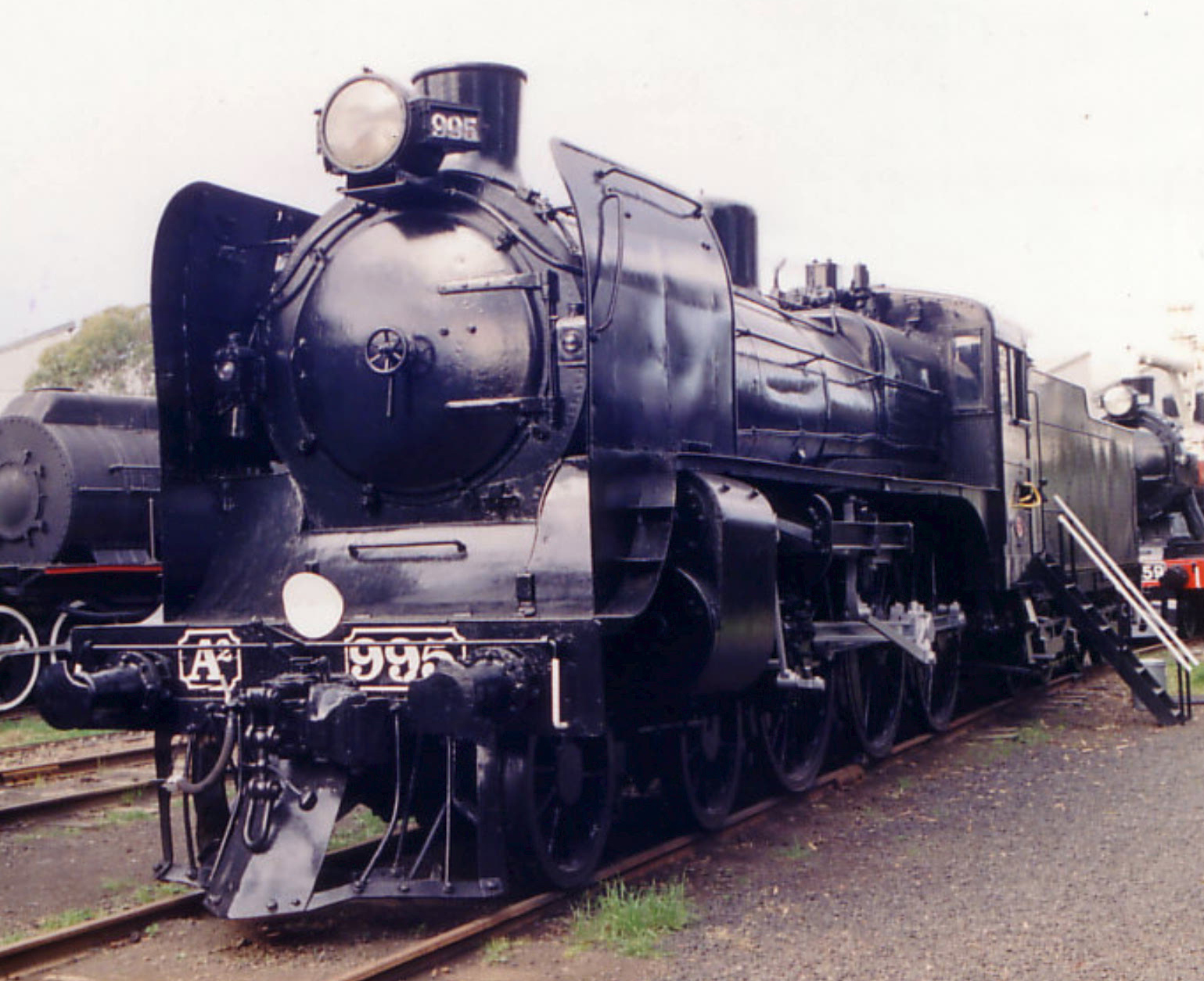
Preserved A2 995, circa 1990

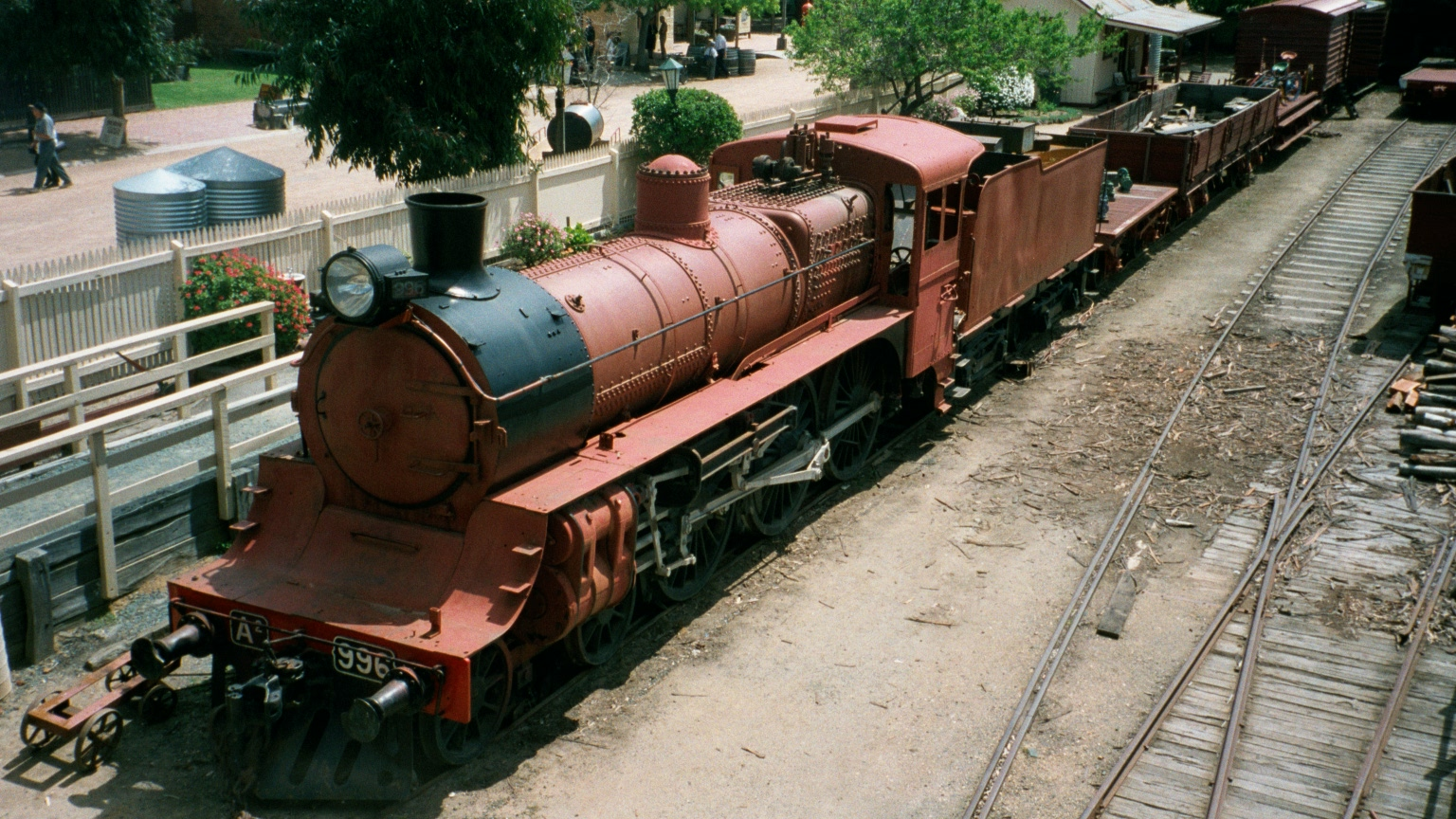
A2 996,

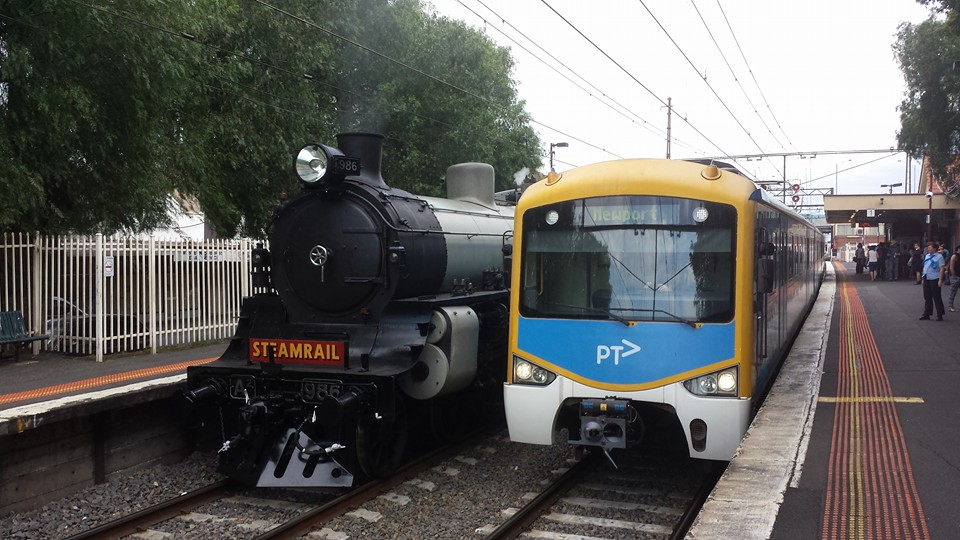
A2 986 at Newport station during a test run in 2015

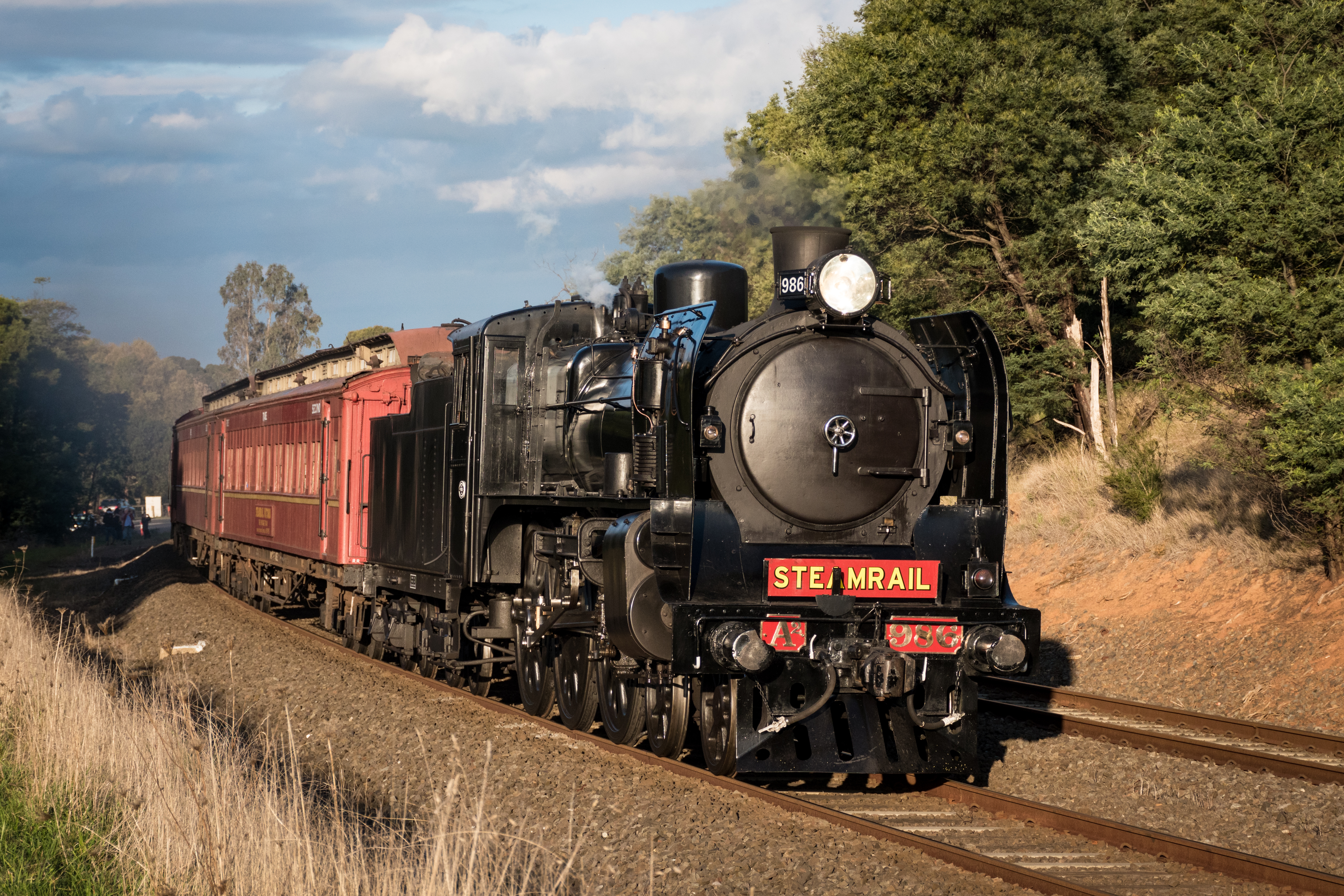
A2 986 approaches Warragul on its official re-launch trip, 13 May 2017

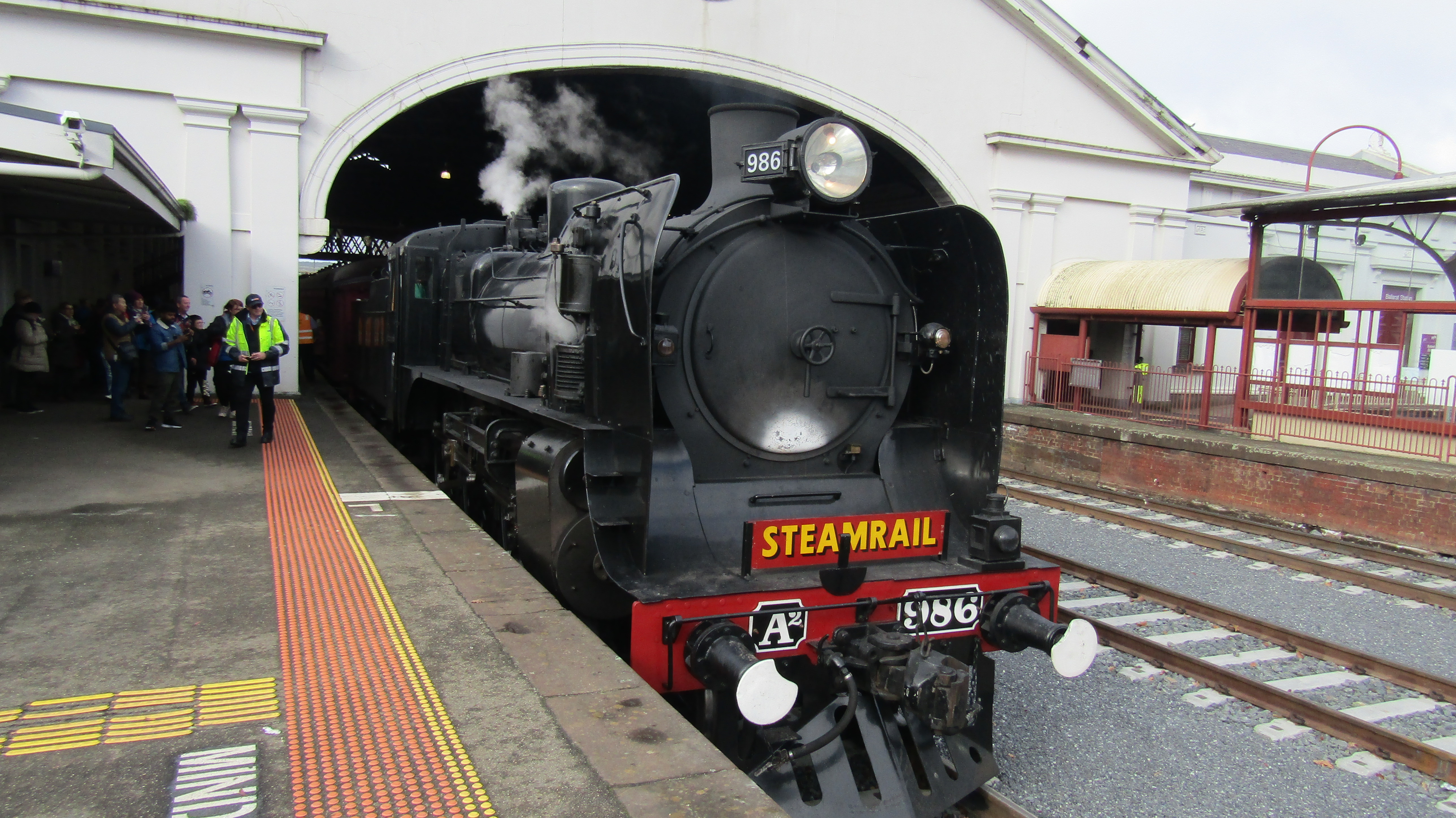
A2 986 at Ballarat Station, 10 June 2023

- A^{2}884: The only one of the original batch of 125 Stephenson 1913-built A^{2} locomotives that survives; and is today preserved at the Newport Railway Museum. The museum notes that A^{2}884 ran a total 1,002,624 miles (1,613,567 km).
- A^{2}964: is preserved at Edwardes Lake Park, Reservoir.
- A^{2}986: After a 32-year-long effort, Steamrail Victoria restored A^{2}986 to full working order as a coal burner. It first moved under steam on 30 May 2015 and entered service with Steamrail on 13 May 2017.
- A^{2}995: Is preserved at the Newport Railway Museum along with A^{2}884. A^{2}995 ran a total 1,270,404 miles (2,044,517 km) during its service life.
- A^{2}996: is preserved at the Port of Echuca along with various rollingstock. West Coast attempted at restoring the locomotive in the early 2000s but the restoration initiative lapsed and A^{2}996 remained stored at old Echuca loco depot until the 24th December 2015 where it was road hauled back to the Port of Echuca.
